= List of LGBTQ events =

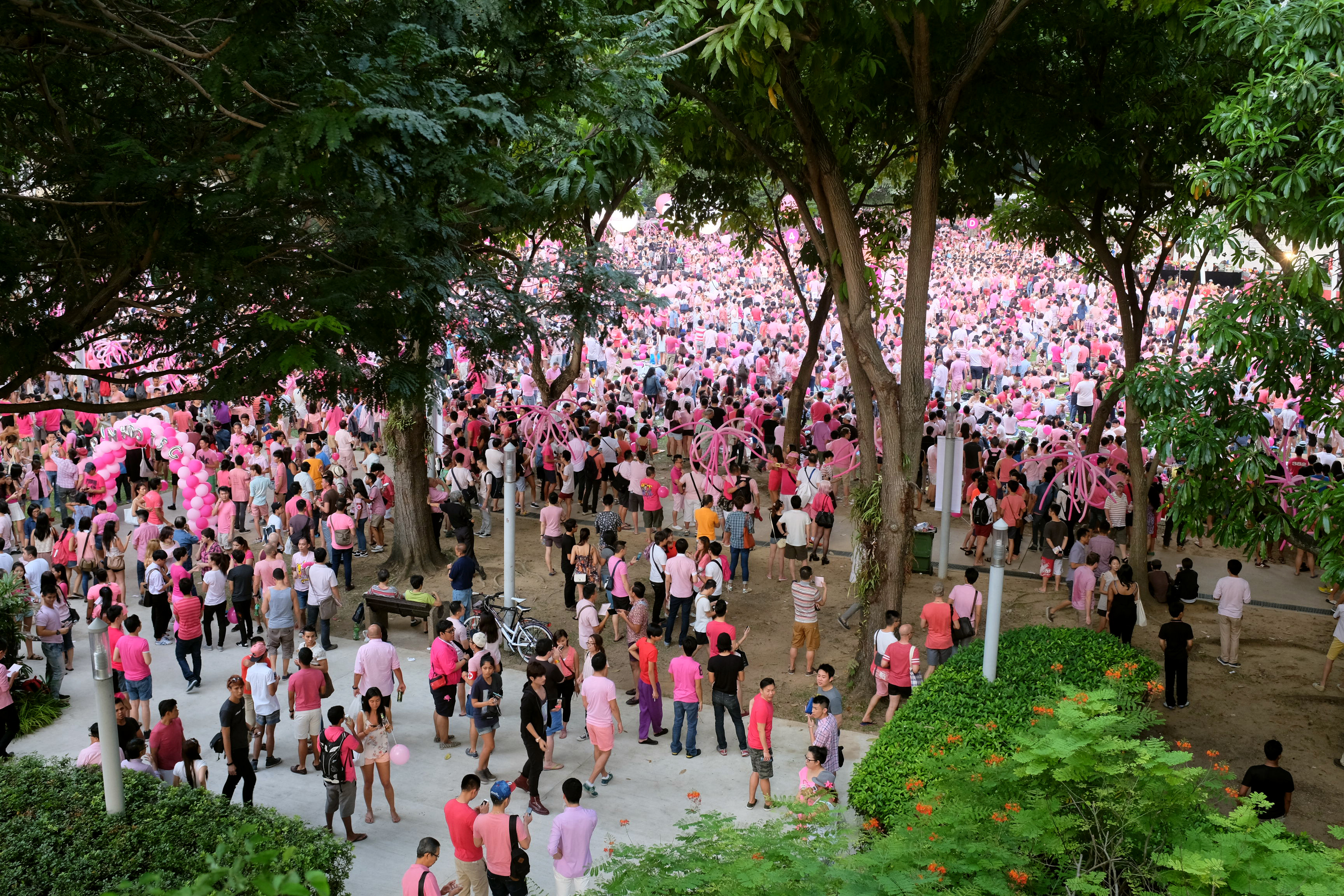
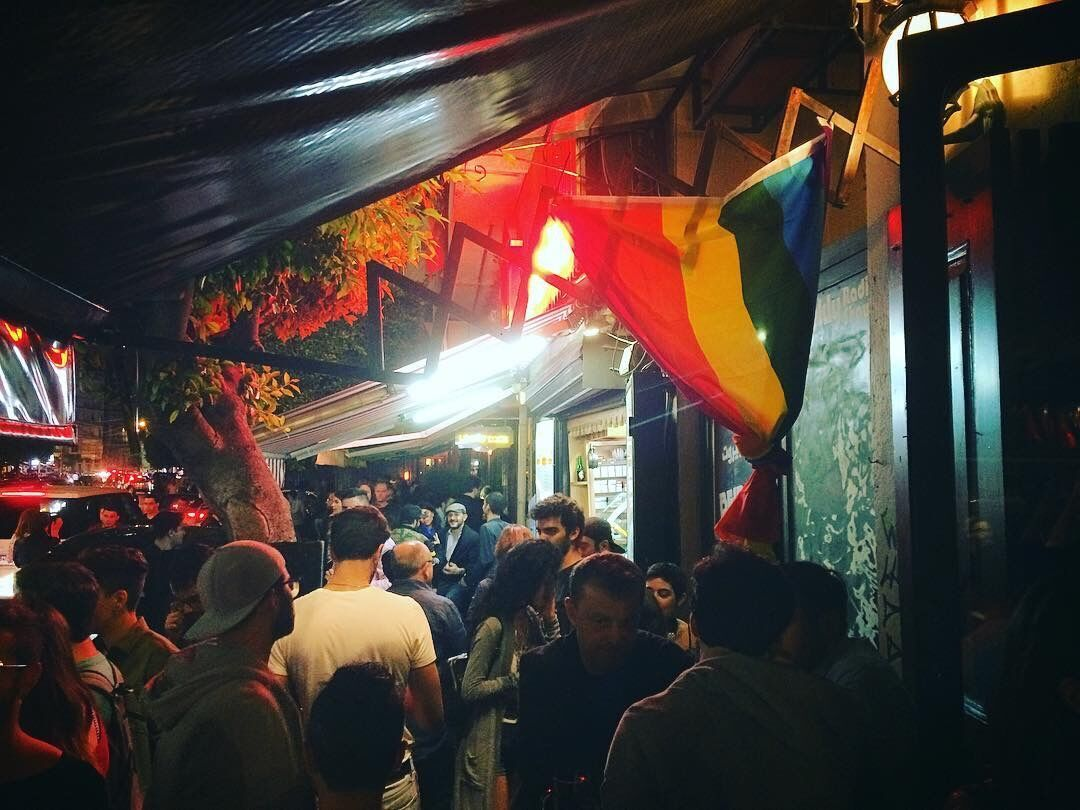
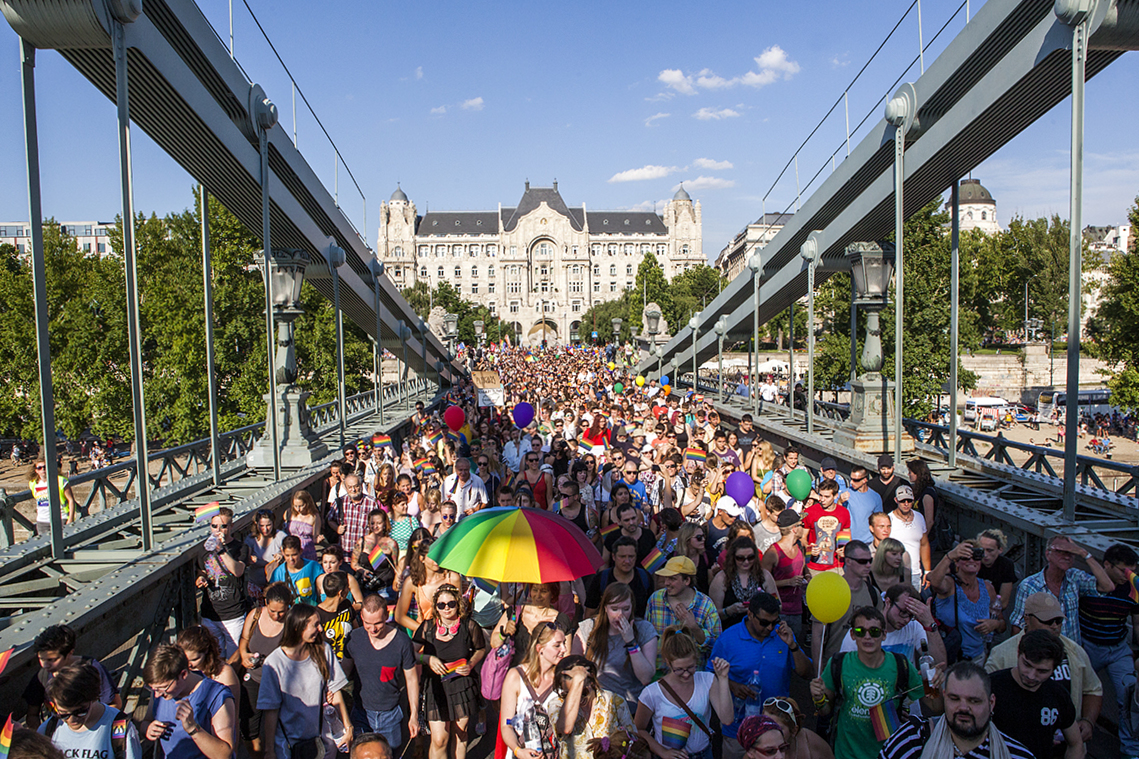
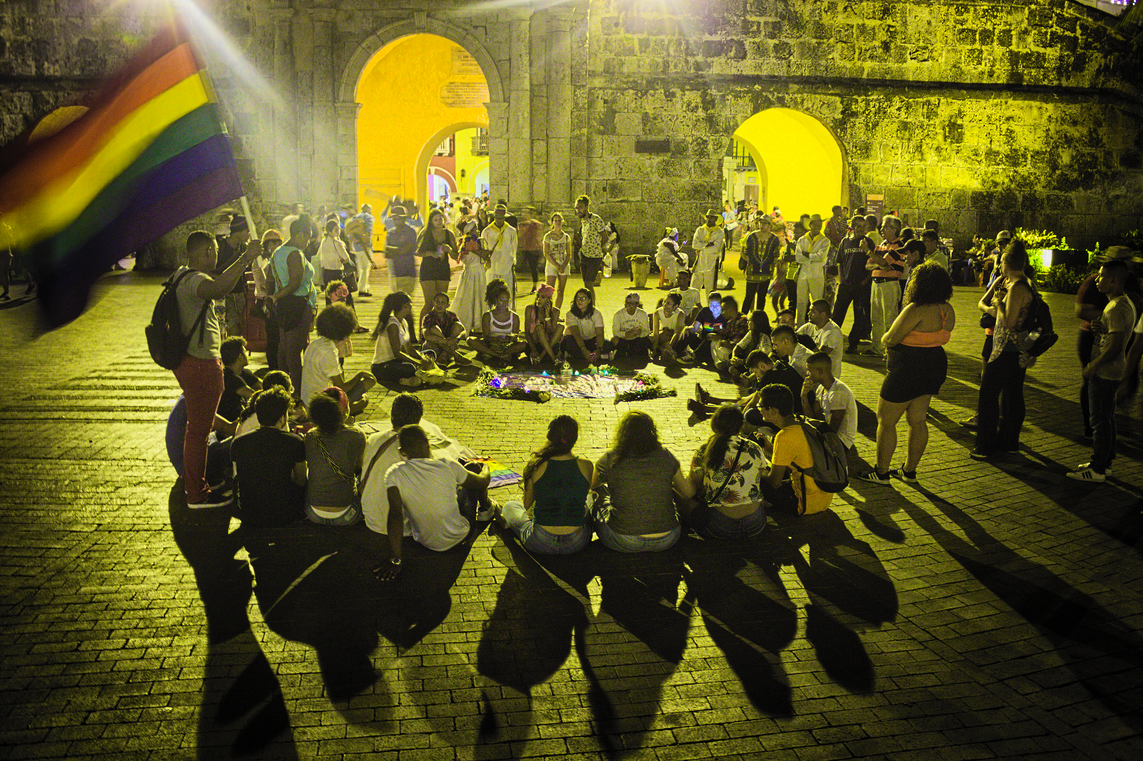
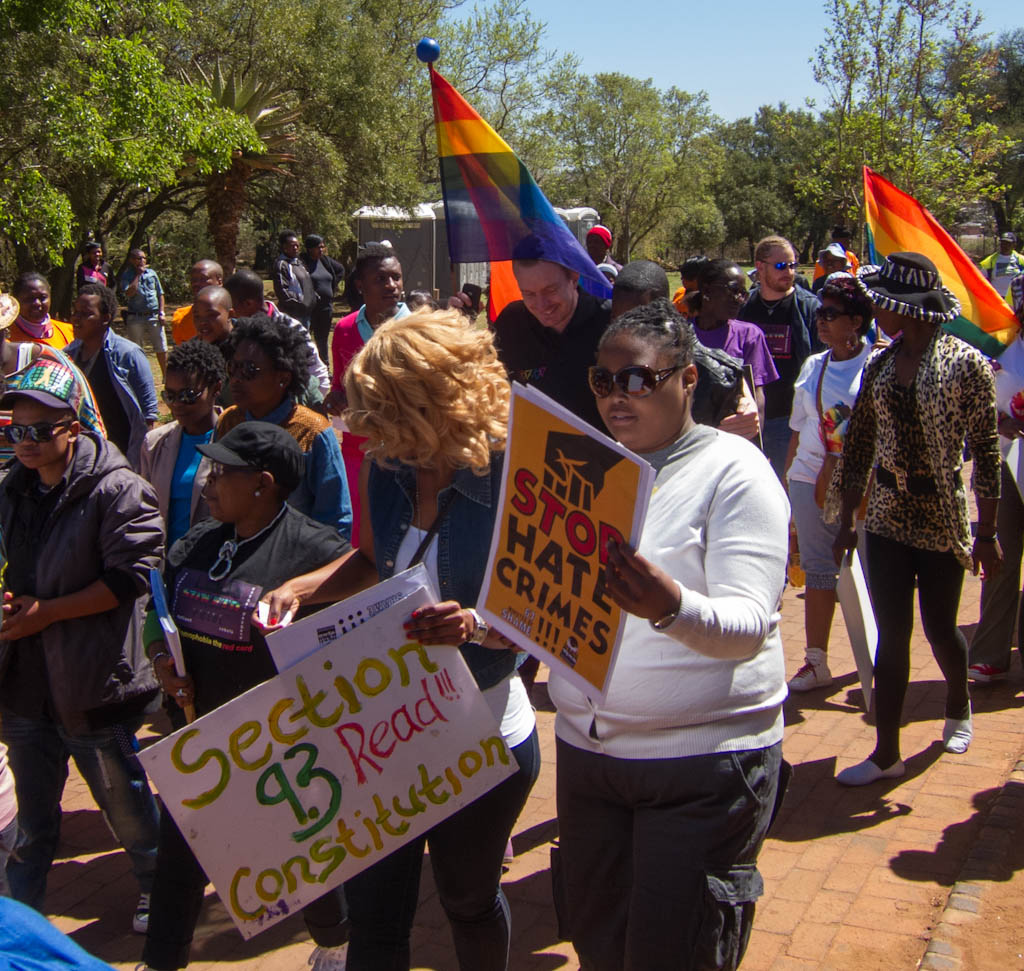
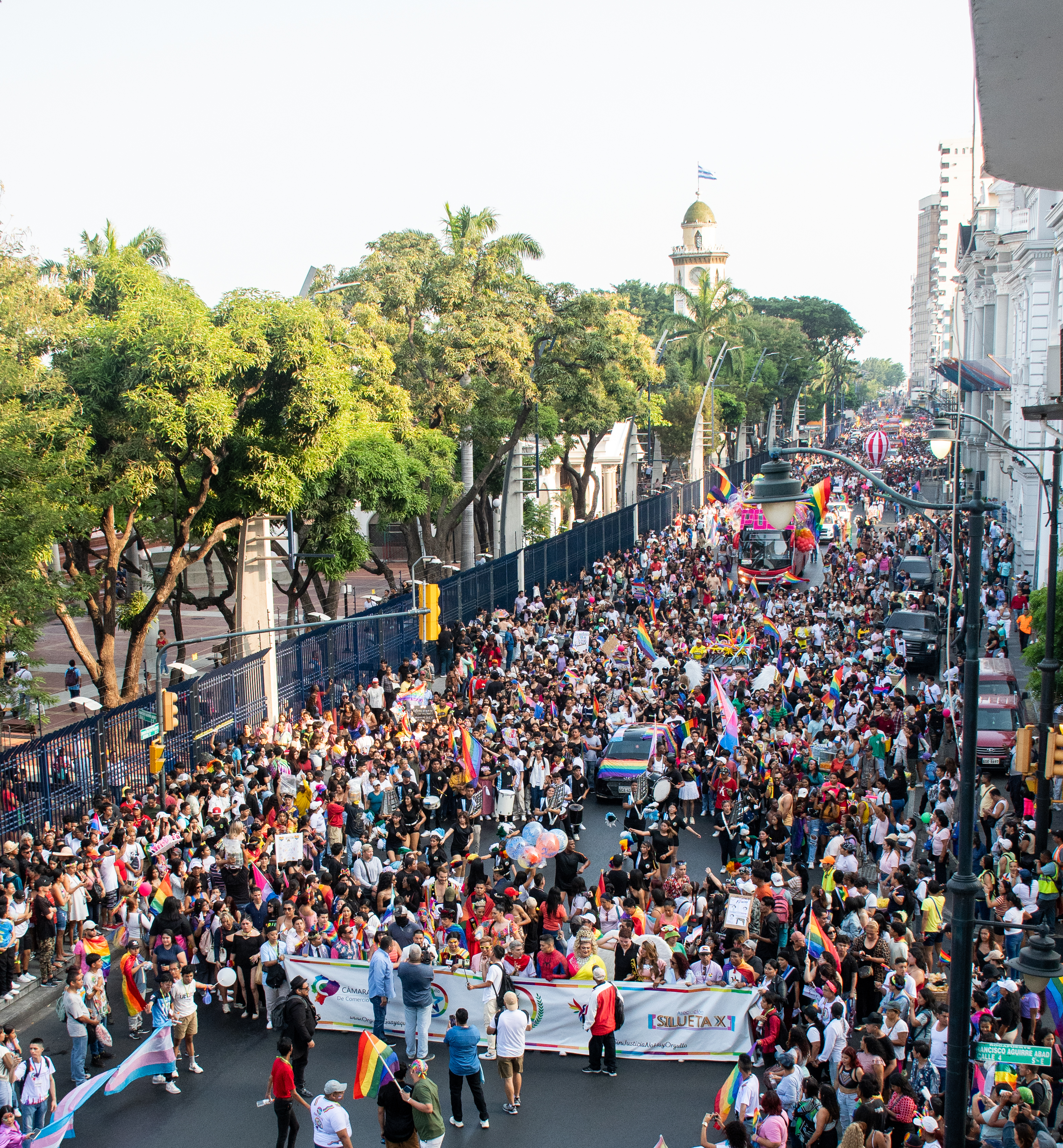
- Pink Dot SG, Singapore Beirut Pride, Beirut, Lebanon Budapest Pride, Budapest, Hungary Transgender Day of Visibility, Cartagena, Colombia Soweto Pride, Soweto, Gauteng Guayaquil Pride, Guayaquil, Ecuador

The following is a calendar of lesbian, gay, bisexual, transgender and queer (LGBTQ) events. This list includes pride parades as well as events ranging from sporting events to film festivals, including celebrations such as Christopher Street Day.

Criteria for inclusion on this list are:

- Established: It has occurred two or more times. Events that have happened only once are excluded.
- LGBTQ: It is primarily focused on one or more of the LGBTQ communities.
- Notable: It is well-attended, has existed for a long time, or is notable in some other way.
- Yearly: It recurs yearly or less often (e.g. quadrennially).

Not all events on this list may be currently active.

== Worldwide ==
LGBT event	Location	Official website	Occurs every	Start
Gay Games	Various	gaygames.org	4 years	1982
International Day Against Homophobia, Transphobia and Biphobia	Everywhere	may17.org	May 17	2005
International Family Equality Day	Everywhere	internationalfamilyequalityday.org	first Sunday of May	2012
International Transgender Day of Visibility	Everywhere	transgenderdayofvisibility.org	March 31	2009
Bisexual Awareness Week (BiWeek)	Everywhere	glaad.org/biweek	16-22 September	2014
Celebrate Bisexuality Day (BiDay)	Everywhere	bivisibilityday.com	23 September	1999
National Coming Out Day	Everywhere	hrc.org	October 11	1988
Transgender Awareness Week	Everywhere	glaad.org/transweek	Second week of November	2000
Transgender Day of Remembrance	Everywhere	glaad.org/tdor	November 20	1999
World OutGames	Various	glisa.org/outgames/world-outgames/	4 years	2006
WorldPride	Various	interpride.org	6 then 2 then 3 years	2000
Trans Flag Day	Everywhere	hrc.org	August 19	2014

== Africa ==
LGBT event	Location	Official website	Occurs every	Start
=== Botswana ===
Gaborone Pride	Gaborone, Botswana	prideofafrica.co.bw	October	2019
=== Mauritius ===
Rainbow Parade Mauritius	Rose Hill	collectifarcenciel.org	June	2006
=== South Africa ===
Cape Town Pride	Cape Town, Western Cape	capetownpride.org	February	2001
International Day Against Homophobia, Biphobia & Transphobia Durban Beach Walk	Durban Beach Front	http://www.pflagsouthafrica.org	May	Annually
Durban Pride	Durban, KwaZulu-Natal	www.durbanpride.org.za	June/July	2011
Durban Gay & Lesbian Film Festival	Durban, KwaZulu-Natal	www.dglff.org.za	August/September	2011
eKurhuleni Pride	East Rand, Gauteng	www.ekurhulenipride.co.za		2009
Johannesburg Pride	Johannesburg, Gauteng	www.prideofafrica.org	October	1990
Mr & Miss Pretoria Gay Pride	Pretoria, Gauteng	http://www.ptapride.co.za	May - October	2014 (founded by F Zeelie, B Walker)
Khumbulani Pride	Gugulethu, Western Cape	capetownpride.org	May	2013
Limpopo Pride	Polokwane, Limpopo	www.limpopolgbtiproudlyout.co.za		2012
Mother City Queer Project	Cape Town, Western Cape	mcqp.co.za	December	1994
Mr Gay World South Africa	Gauteng	mrgwsa.com	November	2009
Nelson Mandela Bay Pride	Port Elizabeth, Eastern Cape	www.nmbpride.co.za	October	2011
Out in Africa Film Festival	Johannesburg, Gauteng and Cape Town, Western Cape	www.oia.co.za	September/October	1994
Pink Loerie Mardi Gras	Knysna, Western Cape	pinkloerie.co.za	May	2001
Pretoria LGBTI Pride	Pretoria, Gauteng	ptapride.co.za	October	2013
Soweto Pride	Soweto, Gauteng	www.sowetopride.co.za	September	2004
=== Tunisia ===
International Day Against Homophobia	Tunis	www.shams-tunisie.com	May	2016

== Asia ==
LGBT event	Location	Official website	Occurs every	Start
=== China ===
Beijing Queer Film Festival	Beijing	www.bjqff.com (Chinese language)	Varies; Usually between May–September	2001
Hong Kong Lesbian & Gay Film Festival	Hong Kong S.A.R.	www.hklgff.hk	September	1989
Hong Kong Pride Parade	Hong Kong	www.hkpride.net/en/	November	2008
Shanghai LGBT Tourism Week	Shanghai	www.tontou.com/pinpai/ShanghaiLGBTTourismWeek	October	2015
Shanghai Pride	Shanghai	www.shpride.com/?lang=en	June	2009
ShanghaiPRIDE Film Festival	Shanghai	www.shpride.com/films/?lang=en	June	2015
Shanghai Queer Film Festival	Shanghai	shqff.org/en	September	2017
=== India ===
Ahmedabad Queer Pride	Ahmedabad	www.instagram.com/queerabad	February	2020
Raipur Queer Pride	Raipur	www.instagram.com/lgbtqchhattisgarh/	September	2019
Bangalore Queer Film Festival	Bangalore	blrqueerfilmfest.com	February	2008
Bengaluru Pride	Bangalore	www.bangalorepride.com	June	2008
Bhopal Pride March	Bhopal		May	2017
Bhubaneswar Pride	Bhubaneswar		June	2009
Chennai Pride	Chennai		June	2009
Delhi Queer Pride	New Delhi		June/July	2008
Pride De Goa (Goa Pride)	Goa	goarainbowtrust.com	November	2018
KASHISH Mumbai International Queer Film Festival	Mumbai	mumbaiqueerfest.com	May	2010
Kolkata Rainbow Pride Walk	Kolkata	kolkatapride.org	June	1999
Mumbai Queer Azadi March	Mumbai	www.queerazaadi.wordpress.com	August	2008
Queer Media Collective Awards in assn. GayBombay	Mumbai	gaybombay.org	June	2009
Orange CIty LGBT Pride March	Nagpur		January	2016
Chandigarh LGBT Pride Walk	Chandigarh, Punjab	https://signedevents.com/india/chandigarh/lgbt-pride-walk-chandigarh-2017 (archived)	March	2017
=== Indonesia ===
Bali PRIDE	Bali	Bali PRIDE		2014
Q! Film Festival	Jakarta	www.qmunity-id.org (archived)		2002
=== Israel ===
Ashdod Pride Parade	Ashdod		June	2013
Be'er Sheva Parade	Beersheba		June	2009
Eilat Pride Parade	Eilat		June	2001
Hadera Pride Parade	Hadera		June	2012
Haifa Pride Parade	Haifa		June	2003
Jerusalem Pride Parade	Jerusalem		June	2002
Petah Tikva Pride Parade	Petah Tikva		June	2012
Rishon LeZion Parade.	Rishon Lezion		June	2010
Tel Aviv Pride Parade	Tel Aviv	telaviv-pride.com	June	1993
TLVFest (the Tel Aviv International LGBT Film Festival)	Tel Aviv	tlvfest.com/tlv/he/en		
World Pride	Jerusalem	www.worldpride.net	June	
=== Iran ===
Iran LGBT Pride Parade, IranPride	Iran	iranlgbt.com	4th Friday of July	2010
=== Japan ===
Aomori International LGBT Film Festival	Aomori	www.aomori-lgbtff.org	July	2006
Asian Queer Film Festival	Tokyo	aqff.jp/2013/english/index.php (from 2013)		2007
Ehime LGBT Film Festival	Matsuyama, Ehime	www.rainbowpride-ehime.org	December (1st Week)	2011
Kansai Queer Film Festival	Osaka & Kyoto	kansai-qff.org		2005
Kansai Rainbow Festa	Osaka	www.rainbowfesta.org	October	2006
Pink Dot Okinawa	Naha, Okinawa	pinkdotok.jp	July	2013
Rainbow Reel Tokyo	Tokyo	rainbowreeltokyo.com/2019/en/	July	1992
Rainbow March	Sapporo		September (2nd Sunday)	1996
Tokyo Pride	Tokyo	tokyorainbowpride.com	April (Last Sunday)	2012
Tokyo Rainbow Week	Tokyo	www.tokyorainbowweek.jp	April/May	2012
=== Korea ===
Busan Queer Culture Festival	Busan	www.busanqueer.org		2017
Daegu Queer Culture Festival	Daegu			2009
Jeju Queer Culture Festival	Jeju Island	www.jejuqcf.org		2017
Jeonju Queer Culture Festival	Jeonju			2018
Korea Queer Film Festival	Seoul	kqff.co.kr		2001
Seoul Pride Film Festival	Seoul	spff.kr		2011
Seoul Queer Culture Festival	Seoul	sqcf.org		2000
TDOR MARCH	Itaewon, Seoul	transliberationfront.com/39		2018
=== Lebanon ===
Beirut Pride	Beirut	www.beirutpride.org	May	2017
=== Malaysia ===
Seksualiti Merdeka	Kuala Lumpur	www.slideshare.net/mobile/aidanesa/seksualiti-merdeka-2012	August	2008
=== Myanmar ===
Yangon Pride Festival (&PROUD)	Yangon	www.andproud.net	January	2014
=== Nepal ===
International Day Against Homophobia, Transphobia and Biphobia	This day is also known as International Day Against Queer/MOGAI-phobia (IDaQuMoB) in Nepal			
Nepal Pride Parade	Kathmandu		June 29	2019
Queer Womxn Pride	Kathmandu	Queer Rights Collective	March 8	2019
Mitini Nepal Pride Parade	Kathmandu	Mitini Nepal	February 14	2005
Blue Diamond Society Pride Parade	Kathmandu, Pokhara, Biratnagar	www.bds.org.np	Gai Jatra	2016
National LGBTI Day (Nepal)	Nepal		Puash 6 (Bikram Sambat)	2015
=== Philippines ===
Black Party Manila	Manila		October	
Metro Manila Pride	Manila	www.metromanilapride.org	June	1994
Pride International Film Festival	Manila			2004
White Party Manila	Manila	www.manilapride2008.com	June	
=== Singapore ===
IndigNation	Singapore	www.indignation.sg	August	2005
Pink Dot	Singapore	pinkdot.sg	May	2009
=== Sri Lanka ===
Abhimani Film Festival	Colombo	www.facebook.com/AbhimaniQueerFFCMB	June	2006
Colombo Pride	Colombo			
=== Taiwan ===
Kaohsiung Pride	Kaohsiung		November	2010
LGBT Civil Rights Movement Film Festival	Taipei		September/October	2000
Taiwan International Queer Film Festival (TIQFF)	Taipei, Kaoshiung and Taichung	en.tiqff.com	October	2014
Taiwan Pride	Taipei	twpride.org/twp/index.php?q=2015_en	September/October	2003
=== Thailand ===
Bangkok Pride	Bangkok	www.facebook.com/bangkokpride.official (on Facebook)	June	2022
Bangkok Gay and Lesbian Film Festival	Bangkok	en-gb.facebook.com/BGLFF (on Facebook)	June	2015
Bangkok Together	Bangkok		October	
Chiang Mai Pride	Chiang Mai	www.facebook.com/cnxpride (on Facebook)	May	2008
Circuit Festival Asia	Pattaya	www.circuitfestival.net www.facebook.com/CircuitFestivalAsia (on Facebook)	June	2018
gCircuit Songkran	Bangkok	www.gcircuit.com	April	2007
Isaan Pride Festival	Khon Kaen	www.facebook.com/profile.php?id=100093585377089 (on Facebook)	June	2022
KHAOSAN Pride Friendly	Bangkok	www.facebook.com/MissTourismWorldThailand (on Facebook)	May/June	2023
Love Pride Parade	Bangkok	emsphere.co.th/event-love-pride-parade-2024	June	2024
Pattaya Gay Festival	Pattaya	www.pattayagayfestival.com	November	
Pattaya International Pride Festival	Pattaya	www.facebook.com/profile.php?id=100076040292895 (on Facebook)	June	2018
Phuket Pride	Phuket	www.phuket-pride.org	March	1999
Pride Nation Samui International Festival	Ko Samui	www.pridenationsamuifestival.com	June	2024
PRISM a Circuit Festival	Bangkok	www.prism-festival.com	February	2024
PRISM: PRIDE	Bangkok	www.prism-festival.com	June	2024
RGB pride party	Bangkok	www.rgb-pridefestival.com	June	2024
Songkhla Pride	Songkhla	www.facebook.com/profile.php?id=100093492336843 (on Facebook)	June	2022
Sunee Plaza Gay Festival	Sunee Plaza, Pattaya	www.suneeplaza.info	November 15	2009
Thailand International LGBTQ+ Film & TV Festival	Bangkok	tilff-thailand.com www.facebook.com/tilff.official (on Facebook)	September	2024
White Party Bangkok	Bangkok	www.whitepartybangkok.com	December	2014
XXO Party	Bangkok	www.facebook.com/XXOParty (on Facebook)	October	2018
ZODIAC LGBTQ Pool Party	Pattaya	www.facebook.com/profile.php?id=61562609172094 (on Facebook)	August	2024

== Europe ==
LGBT event	Location	Official website	Occurs every	Start
=== Continent-wide events ===
EuroPride	Europe	www.epoa.eu	Summer	1992
EuroGames	Europe	www.eglsf.info/eurogames	July	2002
European Gay Ski Week	Europe (location rotates)	www.europeangayskiweek.com	March	
Mr Gay Europe	Europe	www.mrgayeurope.com	August	2003
Rainbow Rampage	Europe	www.rainbowrampage.com	Summer	2008
=== Cross-border events ===
Sápmi Pride	Sápmi: Kiruna and Östersund in Sweden; Karasjok, Kautokeino and Trondheim in Norway; Inari and Utsjoki in Finland	www.facebook.com/sapmipride	August/September	2014
BorderPride	Torne Valley: Tornio in Finland and Haparanda in Sweden	borderpride.fi	August/September	2017
=== Åland ===
Åland Pride	Mariehamn	www.pride.ax	August	2014
=== Austria ===
Gay Snowhappening Soelden	Soelden	www.soelden.com	March	
Vienna Pride and Rainbow Parade (Regenbogen-Parade)	Vienna	viennapride.at	July	1996
Regenbogenball (Rainbow Ball)	Vienna	regenbogenball.at	January	1998
Vienna Dance Contest	Vienna	www.viennadancecontest.at	October	
EuroSki Pride (Euro Ski Pride)	Saalbach	www.euroskipride.com	March	2007
European Lesbian* Conference	Vienna	europeanlesbianconference.org	October	2017
Linz Pride	Linz	www.linzpride.at/	June	2017
=== Belarus ===
Minsk Gay Pride	Minsk	www.pride.gaybelarus.by	October	1999
=== Belgium ===
Queer Pride Gent	Ghent	www.queerpridegent.be	May	2019
Darklands Festival	Antwerp	darklands.be	February / Mars	2009
NaviGAYtion	Antwerp	www.navigaytion.be	June	
AntwerpPride	Antwerp	antwerppride.tv	June	
Antwerp Queer Arts Festival	Antwerp	www.queerarts.be	August	
Brussels Pride	Brussels	www.brusselspride.eu/	May	1996
Brussels Games	Brussels	brusselsgames.bgs.org	September	
Swim for Life	Brussels	swimforlife.brussels	November	1996
Brussels Gay and Lesbian Film Festival	Brussels	www.glb.org	January	1986
Pink Screens	Brussels	pinkscreens.org	October	2002
The Cruise by La Demence	Brussels	www.the-cruise.eu	July	
Liège Pride by Transpédégouines	Liège	www.instagram.com/transpedegouines/	May	2020
Liège Pride	Liège	https://www.liegepride.be/	August	2024
=== Bosnia and Herzegovina ===
Merlinka Queer Film Festival	Sarajevo	merlinka.com	February	2013
The Bosnian-Herzegovinian (BiH) Pride March	Sarajevo	povorkaponosa.ba	September	2019
=== Bulgaria ===
Sofia Pride	Sofia	www.gaypride-bg.com	June	2008
=== Croatia ===
Rhapsody Festival	Zrće Beach	www.rhapsody-festival.com	June	2020
ZbeLeTron	Zagreb	www.zbeletron.org	January–December	2009
Zagreb Pride	Zagreb	www.zagreb-pride.net	June/July	2002
Split Pride	Split	www.split-pride.net	June	2011
Queer Zagreb	Zagreb		April/May	2003-2012
Queer Split	Split		TBA	2012
L-Fest	Zagreb	www.kontra.hr	November	2010
Osijek Pride	Osijek	https://www.facebook.com/pages/Osijek-Pride/467374930082756?sk=timeline&app_data	September	2014
=== Czech Republic ===
Prague Pride	Prague	www.praguepride.cz	August	2011
Queer Parade	Brno		June	2008
Mezipatra Gay and Lesbian Film Festival	Prague	www.mezipatra.cz	November	2000
Queer Pride Parade and Festival	Tábor	www.queerprideparadetabor.cz	June	2009
Rainbow Pride Olomouc	Olomouc	https://olomoucky.denik.cz/zpravy_region/olomouci-poprve-projde-pruvod-gayu-a-leseb-20150730.html	August	2005
=== Cyprus ===
Cyprus Pride	Nicosia	accept.cy	May	2014
=== Denmark ===
Copenhagen Pride	Copenhagen	www.copenhagenpride.dk	August	1996
MIX Copenhagen - LesbianGayBiTrans Film Festival	Copenhagen	www.mixcopenhagen.dk	October	1985
Aarhus Pride	Aarhus	aarhuspride.dk	June	2012
=== Estonia ===
Tallinn Pride	Tallinn	www.pride.ee	August	2004
Tallinn Bearty	Tallinn	www.bearty.org	April	2015
=== Faroe Islands ===
Faroe Pride	Tórshavn	www.lgbt.fo	July 27	2005
=== Finland ===
Vapautuspäivät	Helsinki, Jyväskylä (1995), Oulu (1997)	www.pride.fi/meista/historiaa	Summer	1975–1999
Vinokino film festival	Turku, Helsinki, Tampere, Oulu, Jyväskylä	www.vinokino.fi	Autumn	1992
TransHelsinki	Helsinki	www.transhelsinki.fi	November	1993
Regnbågshelgen: festival for Swedish-speaking Finns	Helsinki	www.regnbagsankan.fi	Spring; Autumn since 2011	2004
Helsinki Pride	Helsinki	pride.fi	June/July (week after Midsummer)	2000; annually 2006
Pirkanmaan Pride	Tampere	www.pirkanmaanpride.fi	June	Leimautumispäivät 1988; Pride 2005; annually 2010
Jyväskylä Pride	Jyväskylä	www.jklseta.fi/pride	August	2001; HalfPride 2011; annually 2019
Vaasa Pride	Vaasa	www.facebook.com/vaasanseta	June	2003; annually 2019
Pohjois-Karjala Pride	Joensuu	www.pohjoiskarjalapride.fi	May	Hohto 2005; annual Pride 2016
Oulu Pride	Oulu	www.oulupride.fi	August	North Pride 2010; annually 2018
Turku Pride	Turku	www.turkupride.fi	August	2011; annually 2014
Arctic Pride	Rovaniemi	www.arcticpride.fi	August	2013
Pori Pride	Pori	www.poripride.fi	August	2013; annually 2019
Lahti Pride	Lahti	www.lahtipride.fi	May	2014
Ruka Ski Pride	Kuusamo	www.ruka.fi/ski-pride	April	2016
Kainuu Pride	Kajaani	www.facebook.com/kainuupride	July	2016
Queerstavi Pride	Kustavi	www.facebook.com/queerstavipride	July	2016
Raseborg Pride	Raseborg	www.raaseporipride.fi	September	2016
Lohja Pride	Lohja	www.lohjapride.fi	August	2017
Mikkeli Pride	Mikkeli	www.mikkelipride.fi	October	2017
Kouvola Pride	Kouvola	www.kouvolapride.fi	August	2018
=== France ===
European Snow Pride	Tignes	www.europeansnowpride.com		
In&Out	Nice	www.lesouvreurs.fr	April–May	2009
Grenoble International Gay & Lesbian Film Festival	Grenoble	www.vuesdenface.com	April	
Gay Pride Lorraine	Metz	gaypridelorraine.free.fr	March	
European Snow Pride	Tignes	www.europeansnowpride.com	March	
Gay Pride Lyon	Lyon	www.fierte.net	June	
La Marche des Fiertés	Bordeaux		10th June	
Lesbian & Gay Pride Lille	Lille	www.lgplille.org		
Lesbian & Gay Pride Montpellier	Montpellier	www.montpelliergay.com		
Lesbian & Gay Pride région Centre	Tours	www.lgpregioncentre.org	May	2006
Pride Marseille	Marseille	www.pride-marseille.com	July	
Fierté Ours Paris	Paris	https://lesoursdeparis.fr	May/June	
Bears'den Paris	Paris			
Paris Fetish	Paris	https://paris-fetish.com	May	2014
Paris Pride	Paris	www.inter-lgbt.org	June	
Solidays	Paris	www.solidarite-sida.org	July	
L'Existrans	Paris	https://existrans.org/	October	
Paris Sneakweek	Paris	https://paris.gaycities.com/events/407005-paris-sneakweek-nov	November	2011
Rub Week	Paris	https://mecs-en-caoutchouc.com	November	1994
=== Georgia ===
Tbilisi Pride	Tbilisi	tbilisipride.ge	June	2019
=== Germany ===
Teddy Award	Berlin	https://teddyaward.tv/en	February	1987
Easter Berlin (Leather Pride)	Berlin	blf.de	March or April	1973
Snax Party	Berlin	https://www.lab-oratory.de	March or April	1992
Revolver Easter Party	Berlin	https://revolverparty.com	March or April	2013
German Mr. Leather	Berlin	blf.de	March or April	1998
Sneakfreaxx Party	Berlin	sneakfreaxx.de	March or April	2005
Lesbian and Gay City Festival	Berlin	www.regenbogenfonds.de	July	1993
Berlin Pride CSD Berlin	Berlin	www.csd-berlin.de	July	1979
Berlin Canal Pride CSD auf der Spree	Berlin	https://www.canalpride.com	July	2006
Revolver Pride Party	Berlin	https://revolverparty.com	July	2013
Dyke March Berlin	Berlin	https://dykemarchberlin.com	July	2013
Friedrichshain Gay & Lesbian Park Party	Berlin	www.parkfest-friedrichshain.de	August	1998
Folsom Europe Street Fair	Berlin	https://folsomeurope.berlin	September	2003
Revolver Folsom Party	Berlin	https://revolverparty.com	September	2013
International Gay Rubber Weekend	Berlin	blf.de	September	1998
Queer Film Festival	Berlin, Cologne, Dresden, Düsseldorf, Frankfurt, Fürstenwalde, Halle (Saale), Leipzig, Magdeburg, Munich, Nuremberg, Stuttgart and Vienna	www.queerfilmfestival.net	September	
Hustlaball	Berlin	www.hustlaball.de	October	2003
International Gay Skinhead Weekend	Berlin	blf.de	November	1997
Christmas Avenue	Berlin	https://christmas-avenue.berlin	November / December	2019
Sylvester on Mehringdamm	Berlin	www.aha-berlin.de	December	
Damenparty - LGBTQ Carnival	Cologne	www.stattgarde.de	January	
Jeck Op Deck / Matrosenparty - LGBTQ Carnival	Cologne	www.stattgarde.de	February/March	
Röschen Sitzung - LGBTQ Carnival	Cologne	www.roeschensitzung.de	February/March	2005
Schnittchen Sitzung - Lesbian Carnival	Cologne	www.dieschnittchensitzung.de	February/March	2005
The World of SEXY Party	Cologne	www.sexyparty.cologne	February/March, July, September, November & December	
European Bear Weekend / Mr Bear Europe	Cologne	www.eurobearsweek.com	May	2017
Cologne Leather Pride	Cologne	www.rheinfetisch.de	May – June	
Come-Together-Cup Köln	Cologne	www.come-together-cup.de	June	1995
Cologne Pride CSD Köln / Rainbow Flash Cologne - IDAHOBIT (2011)	Cologne	www.colognepride.de	July	1980
Dyke March Cologne	Cologne	www.dykemarchcologne.de	July	2015
Kettengassenfest	Cologne	era.chayns.net	August	1996
Trans Pride Cologne	Cologne	transpridecologne.wordpress.com	September	2018
Run of Colours	Cologne	www.facebook.com/runofcolours	September	2008
Filmfest homochrom	Cologne	www.homochrom.de	October	2011
Captain's Dinner - LGBTQ Carnival	Cologne	www.stattgarde.de	November	
International German Bear Pride / Mr Bear Germany	Cologne	bartmaenner-koeln.com	November	1992
Christopher Street Day Dortmund	Dortmund	www.csd-dortmund.de	July	
Filmfest homochrom	Dortmund	www.homochrom.de	October	2011
Christopher Street Day Dresden	Dresden	www.csd-sachsen.de	June	
Christopher Street Day	Erfurt	www.csd-mitteldeutschland.de	August	2012
Frankfurt Gay Pride CSD Frankfurt	Frankfurt	www.csd-frankfurt.de	July	
Run For More Time	Frankfurt	www.lauf-fuer-mehr-zeit.de	September	
Schwule Filmwoche Freiburg	Freiburg	www.schwule-filmwoche.de	April/May	
Come-Together-Cup Auf Schalke	Gelsenkirchen	www.come-together-cup.de	September	
Harbour Pride	Hamburg	https://www.ahoi-events.de/harbour-pride	May	2005
Hamburg Pride	Hamburg	www.hamburgpride.com	August	1980
Beach Pride Hamburg	Hamburg	https://beachpridefestival.de/	August	2021
Hamburg Leatherparty (Hamburg Ledertreffen)	Hamburg	www.msc-hamburg.eu	August	1973
Hamburg Queer Film Festival	Hamburg	www.heinfiete.de	October	1994
Hamburg Queer Film Festival Festival at Pulverteich	Hamburg	www.lsf-hamburg.de	October	1989
Pink Inc. Party	Hamburg	https://pinkinc.de		2014
Babylon Hamburg	Hamburg	https://babylon.hamburg		
QueerBall Hamburg	Hamburg	https://www.queerball.de		2019
Hamburg Winter Pride	Hamburg	https://www.winterpride.de	December	
Christopher Street Day Leipzig	Leipzig	www.csd-leipzig.de	July	2004
Christopher Street Day Munich	Munich	www.csd-munich.de	July	
Gay Oktoberfest at Bräurosi	Munich	www.mlc-muenchen.de	September	
Christopher Street Day Nuremberg Nuremberg Pride	Nuremberg	www.csd-nuernberg.org	August	1998
Dyke March Nuremberg	Nuremberg	dykemarchnuernberg.wordpress.com	August	2018
Gay in May - Kulturtag der Vielfalt	Osnabruck	www.gayinmay.de	May	1979
Rosa Courage-Preis	Osnabruck	www.rosa-courage.de	May	1992
Christopher Street Day	Stuttgart	www.csd-stuttgart.de	July – August	
Christopher Street Day	Tübingen	www.csd-tuebingen.de		2021
=== Greece ===
Athens Pride	Athens	www.athenspride.eu	early June	2005
Thessaloniki Pride	Thessaloniki	thessalonikipride.com	mid June	2012
RADical Pride	Thessaloniki	[Patras City]	May	2017
Patras Pride	Patras	[Patras City]	June	2016
Heraklion Pride	Heraklion	[Heraklion City]	June	2015
OUTVIEW film festival	Athens	www.outview.gr	April 18–28	2013
Homotopia	Thessaloniki	omotopia (Facebook page)	May	2010
XLSIOR Festival	Mykonos Island	www.xlsiorfestival.com	August 24–28	2011
Thessaloniki International LGBTQ Film Festival	Thessaloniki	lgbtq-iff.gr	October	1998
=== Hungary ===
Budapest Pride	Budapest	budapestpride.hu	June – July	1997
Pécs Pride	Pécs		September	2021
=== Iceland ===
Reykjavík Gay Pride	Reykjavík	www.gaypride.is	August	1999
Rainbow Reykjavík	Reykjavík	www.rainbowreykjavik.com	January	LGBT winter festival
Bears on Ice	Reykjavík	www.bearsonice.org	September	Bear festival
Pink December	Reykjavík	www.pinkiceland.is	December	Pink Iceland's LGBT winter festival
Pink Party	Reykjavík	www.pinkiceland.is	All year round	Pink Iceland's legendary GAY PARTY in Iceland
=== Ireland ===
Cork Pride	Cork	corkpride.com	End July-Early August 2018	1993
Dublin Pride	Dublin	dublinpride.ie	June	1983
Galway Community Pride	Galway	galwaypride.com	3rd week in August	
Kerry Festival of Pride - Kerry Pride	Tralee	kerrypride.ie	May	2013
Limerick Pride	Limerick	limerickpride.ie	1st week July	2007
Mayo Pride	Mayo	mayopride.com/	July	2017
Sligo Pride Festival	Sligo	sligopride.com	August	2019
Waterford Gay Pride	Waterford		August	2008
Alternative Miss Ireland	Dublin	www.alternativemissireland.com	March	1987
GAZE International LGBT Film Festival Dublin	Dublin	www.gaze.ie	late July–early August	1992
International Dublin Gay Theatre Festival	Dublin	www.gaytheatre.ie	May	2004
Mr Gay Ireland	Dublin	www.mrgayireland.ie	October	2005
Trans & Intersex Pride - Dublin	Dublin	https://twitter.com/dubtrans	July	2018
=== Italy ===
Salento Pride	Brindisi / Gallipoli, Apulia	www.salentopride.it	June/August	2015
Gate Party	Milan, Lombardy	www.gateparty.com	Monthly Party - From October to June	
Bologna Pride	Bologna, Emilia-Romagna	www.bolognapride.it	late June	
Gay Open Tennis	Milan, Lombardy	www.atomoitalia.org	September	
Friendly Versilia	Torre del Lago, Tuscany	www.friendlyversilia.it	April – September	1999
Gay Village, Italy	Rome, Lazio	www.gayvillage.it	June – September	
International Gay & Lesbian Film Festival	Turin, Piedmont	www.turinglfilmfestival.com	April	
Milano Pride	Milan, Lombardy	www.milanopride.it	June	
Rome Pride	Rome, Lazio	www.romapride.it	June	2000
Catacombs - Leather Weekend	Rome, Lazio	www.lcroma.com	December	2000
Catania Pride	Catania, Sicily		last week in June	
Torino Pride	Turin	www.torinopride.it		
Palermo pride	Palermo, Sicily	www.palermopride.it	May/June	
Varese Pride	Varese, Lombardy	www.varesepride.it	June	2016
=== Latvia ===
Riga Pride and Friendship Days	Riga	www.mozaika.lv		
Baltic Pride	Riga	www.balticpride.eu	May 15–17	2009
=== Lithuania ===
Baltic Pride	Vilnius	https://www.lgl.lt/ https://gopride.lt/	June 6	2026
SapfoFest	Punia	www.sapfofest.lt		2014
=== Luxembourg ===
Luxembourg Pride	Esch-sur-Alzette (Parade & Street Fest), Luxembourg (some minor events)	www.luxembourgpride.lu	2nd Saturday in July	1996
=== Malta ===
Malta Pride	Valletta	Allied Rainbow Communities		2016
=== Montenegro ===
Montenegro Pride	Podgorica	www.queermontenegro.org	October 21	2013
Merlinka Festival	Podgorica	www.merlinka.com	May	2014
Nikšić Pride	Nikšić	www.queermontenegro.org	September	2022
=== Moldova ===
Moldova Lesbian and Gay Pride	Chişinău	www.gay.md		
=== Netherlands ===
Amsterdam Gay Pride	Amsterdam, North Holland	pride.amsterdam	August	
Milkshake Festival	Amsterdam, North Holland	www.milkshakefestival.com	July	2012
Amsterdam Leather Pride	Amsterdam, North Holland	www.leatherpride.nl	November	
Eindhoven Pride	Eindhoven, North Brabant	www.eindhovenpride.nl	June	2023
The Midsummer Canal Festival	Utrecht, Utrecht	www.midzomergracht.nl	June	
The Pink Kermis (Roze Maandag/Pink Monday)	Tilburg, North Brabant	www.kermistilburg.nl	July	
Pinkster Tennis Tournament	Amsterdam, North Holland	www.smashing-pink.nl	May	
White Party	Amsterdam, North Holland	www.riedijkproductions.com		
Pink Christmas	Amsterdam, North Holland	www.pinkchristmas.nl		
Rotterdam Pride	Rotterdam, South Holland	www.rotterdampride.com	September	2014
=== North Macedonia ===
Skopje Pride	Skopje	s-front.org.mk	June	2019
=== Norway ===
Bergen Pride	Bergen	www.bergengaypride.com		
International Gay and Lesbian Filmfestival	Oslo	www.oglff.org	June	1990
Skeive dager	Oslo	www.skeivedager.no	June	
Stavanger på skeivå	Stavanger	www.skeiva.no	September	
Trondheim Pride	Trondheim	www.trondheimpride.no	September	
Raballder Cup	Oslo	www.raballdercup.com	March	
Haugaland Pride	Haugesund	www.haugalandpride.no	August	
=== Poland ===
Queer May Festival and Cracow Equality March	Kraków	www.queerowymaj.org	April	2004
Poznań Days of Equality and Tolerance	Poznań	www.dnirownosci.pl	November	2004
Equality Parade	Warsaw	www.paradarownosci.eu	May or June	2001
Wrocław Festival of Equal Rights	Wrocław	www.wroclawfestiwalrownychpraw.pl	October	2009
Marathon of Equality	Łódź	www.fabrykarownosci.com	April	2011
Białystok equality march	Białystok		July	2019
=== Portugal ===
Coimbra LGBT Pride Parade	Coimbra	www.marcha-coimbra.org	May 17	2010
Lisbon Gay & Lesbian Film Festival	Lisbon, Estremadura	www.lisbonfilmfest.org	September	
Lisbon LGBT Pride Parade	Lisbon, Estremadura	www.portugalpride.org	June	
Arraial Pride Party	Lisbon, Estremadura	www.ilga-portugal.pt	June	
Porto Pride Party	Porto	www.portopride.org	July (2nd weekend)	
Porto LGBT Pride Parade	Porto	www.orgulhoporto.org	July (2nd weekend)	
Pride Azores	Azores Islands	www.prideazores.com	August 28 to September 2	
=== Romania ===
Bucharest Pride	Bucharest	www.bucharestpride.ro	May/June	2004
Cluj Pride	Cluj-Napoca	www.clujpride.ro	June	2017
Gay Film Nights	Cluj-Napoca	serilefilmuluigay.ro	April (previously September/October)	2004
Miss Travesty Romania	Cluj-Napoca	www.miss.beanangel.ro	May	2005
Pride TM	Timișoara	identity.education/pride-tm.html	June	2019
Iași Pride	Iași		June	2021
=== Russia ===
Moscow Pride	Moscow	www.moscowpride.ru	May	2006
International Gay and Lesbian Film Festival «Side by Side»	Saint Petersburg	www.bok-o-bok.ru	October	2008
International Festival of Queer Culture	Saint Petersburg	www.queerfest.ru	September	2009
=== Serbia ===
Belgrade Pride	Belgrade	www.parada.rs	2001	
Queer Belgrade Festival	Belgrade	www.queerbeograd.org	October	2004
Merlinka Queer Film Festival	Belgrade	merlinka.com	December	2009
Novi Sad Pride	Novi Sad	www.parada.rs	May	2019
Niš Pride	Niš	www.parada.rs	September	2019
=== Slovakia ===
Dúhový Pride	Bratislava	www.duhovypride.sk	May/June	2010
Filmový festival inakosti	Bratislava	www.ffi.sk	September/October	2007
PRIDE Rainbow Košice	Košice	www.pridekosice.sk	September	2013
=== Slovenia ===
Ljubljana Pride	Ljubljana	www.ljubljanapride.org	July	2001
Ljubljana Gay and Lesbian Film Festival	Ljubljana, Maribor Pride	www.lgbtfilmfest.si	December	1984
=== Spain ===
Winter Pride Maspalomas	Maspalomas, Gran Canaria, Canary Islands	www.winterpride.com	November	2014
Sitges Gay Carnival	Sitges	www.sitgesgaycarnival.com	February	
Sitges Gay Pride	Sitges	www.gaysitgespride.com	June	
Bearcelona	Barcelona	www.bearcelona.org	March	1977
Barcelona Gay and Lesbian Film Festival	Barcelona, Catalonia	www.gaybarcelona.net	July	
Carnival Maspalomas	Maspalomas, Gran Canaria, Canary Islands	www.maspalomas.com	March	
Gay Pride Maspalomas	Maspalomas, Gran Canaria, Canary Islands	www.maspalomaspride.es	May	
Freedom Maspalomas Gay Festival	Canary Islands	www.freedomgayfestival.com	October	
Maspalomas Bear Carnival	Maspalomas, Gran Canaria, Canary Islands	www.bearcarnival.com	March	
Valencia Pride	Valencia	www.lambdavalencia.org	June	
Ibiza Gay Pride	Ibiza	www.ibizapride.net	June	
Pride Barcelona	Barcelona	www.pridebarcelona.org	June	2009
Loveball Festival	Barcelona	www.loveball.info	August	
Los Palomos	Badajoz	www.lospalomos.es	June	
Madrid Pride	Madrid	www.madoweb.com	First weekend of July	1977
LesGaiCineMad	Madrid	www.lesgaicinemad.com		
Zinegoak	Bilbao	www.zinegoak.com	February	
Mr. Gay Spain	Madrid	www.mrgaypride.es		2008
Mad.Bear	Madrid	www.madbear.org		
Sleazy Madrid	Madrid	www.sleazymadrid.com	April	
Circuit Festival	Barcelona	www.circuitfestival.net	August	
OlaGirls, the Lesbian Mediterranean Getaway	Calpe, Alicante	www.olagirls.com	June	
ELLA International Lesbian Festival	Mallorca, Balearic Islands	ellafestival.com	September	
Cádiz Pride	Cádiz	www.elpopulocadiz.com	June 6–12	
=== Sweden ===
Falupride	Falun	www.facebook.com/RfslDalarna	September	2012
Baltic Battle	Stockholm	www.balticbattle.se	September	1977
International Swedish Gay Camp	Swedish nature site, close to the Baltic Sea	www.gaycamp.se	July	1983
Malmö Pride	Malmö	https://www.malmopride.se		1995
Stockholm Pride	Stockholm	www.stockholmpride.org		1998
West Pride	Gothenburg	www.westpride.se		2007
Jönköping Qom Ut	Jönköping	www.qomut.se	May–July	2013
Helsingborg Pride	Helsingborg	www.helsingborgpride.se	May–July	2013
=== Switzerland ===
Pride Zurich 1984	Zürich	first gay pride in Switzerland		1984
Pride Geneva 1997	Geneva	first gay pride in the francophone area of Switzerland	July 5	1997
Pride 2001 Sion	Sion	Gay pride Sion 2001	July 7	2001
Pride 2004 Geneva	Geneva	Gay pride 2004	July 10	2004
Arosa Gay Ski Week	Arosa, Graubünden	www.arosa-gayskiweek.com	January	2005
Pride 2006 Lausanne	Lausanne	Gay pride romande 2006	July 9	2006
Pride 2011 Geneva	Geneva	Swiss pride 2011	June 30	2011
Pride 2013 Fribourg	Fribourg	www.pride2013.ch	June 22	2013
Pride 2015 Sion	Sion	Pride Sion 2015	June 13	2013
Jungle Gay Mousse Party	Lausanne	www.gay-party.com	July 31	1993
Zurich Pride Festival	Zürich	zurichpridefestival.ch	June 8, 2013	
Pride Lugano 2018	Lugano	Swiss Pride Lugano 2018	June 2	2018
Zurich Lake Crossing	Zürich	www.gaysport.ch	July	
=== Turkey ===
AFM International Independent Film Festival	Istanbul, Ankara, İzmir	www.ifistanbul.com	January	2002
Lambda Istanbul Pride Week	Istanbul	www.lambdaistanbul.org	June	2003
Walking against Homophobia and Transphobia	Ankara	www.kaosgl.org	May	2007
Baki Koşar Combating Hate Crimes Week	İzmir	www.siyahpembe.org	February	2009
Trans Pride Week March	Istanbul	www.istanbul-lgbtt.net	June	2010
LuBUnya Film Week	Istanbul	www.lubunyabogazici.blogspot.com	December	2010
Kuirfest	Ankara	www.festival.pembehayat.org	January	2012
=== Ukraine ===
Kyiv Pride	Kyiv	www.kyivpride.org		2013
Kharkiv Pride	Kharkiv	www.instagram.com/kharkivpride/		2019
Odesa Pride	Odesa			2016
Kryvbas Pride / March for Equality	Kryvyi Rih			2018
Lviv Pride	Lviv			2025
Trans March	Kyiv			2016
=== United Kingdom ===
Belfast Pride	Belfast, Northern Ireland	belfastpride.com	August	1991
Birmingham Pride	Birmingham, England	www.birminghampride.com	May	
Birmingham Pride Ball	Birmingham, England	www.prideball.co.uk	March	
Bourne Free Pride Festival	Bournemouth, England	bournefree.co.uk	July 11–13, 2008	2003
Brighton Pride	Brighton, England	www.brighton-pride.org	August	
Trans Pride Brighton	Brighton, England	transpridebrighton.org	July	2013
Bristol Pride	Bristol, England	bristolpride.co.uk	July	2010
Pride Canterbury	Canterbury, Kent, England	pridecanterbury.com	June	2016
Pride Cymru / Cardiff Pride	Cardiff, Wales	www.pridecymru.com	September	
Chew Disco	Liverpool, England	chew-disco.co.uk/about		2009
Cornwall Pride	Cornwall, England	www.cornwallpride.org		2007
Coventry Pride	Coventry, England	www.covpride.org.uk	June	2015
Doncaster Pride	Doncaster, Yorkshire, England	www.doncasterpride.co.uk	August 16	2009
Exeter Pride	Exeter, Devon, England	www.exeterpride.co.uk	Early Spring	2008
Festival Fortnight	Scotland	festivalfortnight.org	June 17–30	2013
Foyle Pride	Derry, Northern Ireland	www.facebook.com/foylepride/	August	1993
Furness Pride	Barrow-in-Furness, Cumbria	https://facebook.com/events/s/furness-pride/2443049822627933/?ti=cl	May	2020
Glasgay! Festival LGBT Arts Festival	Glasgow, Scotland	www.glasgay.co.uk	October	
Grampian Pride	Aberdeen, Scotland	www.grampianpride.org		
Happy Valley Pride	Hebden Bridge, England	www.happyvalleypride.co.uk	2nd week in August (7 day festival)	2016
Homotopia	Liverpool, England	www.homotopia.net	November	
Huddersfield Pink Picnic	Castle Hill, Huddersfield	salfordpride.org.uk/thepinkpicnic	July	1986
Pride in Hull	Hull, England	prideinhull.co.uk	July	2001
Leeds Pride	Leeds, England	www.leedspride.com	First Sunday in August	2004
Leicester Pride	Leicester, England	www.leicesterpride.com		
Cardiff Lesbian & Gay Ball	Cardiff, Wales	www.gaywales.co.uk	May	
Lincolnshire Pride	Lincoln, England	www.lincolnshirepride.com	July	2006
Liverpool Pride	Liverpool, England	www.lcrpride.co.uk/prideinlpool/	August 7	2010
BFI Flare: London LGBT Film Festival	London, England	www.bfi.org.uk/flare	March	1986
National Student Pride	London, United Kingdom	studentpride.co.uk	March	2005
The London Drag Olympics	London, England	www.thewayoutclub.com	April	
Bear Pride London	London, England	www.xxl-london.com/bear-pride	May	2007
Pride in London	London, England	prideinlondon.org	June/July	1972
Fetish Week London	London, England	https://www.fetishweek.com	July	2010
Soho Pride	London, England		August	
UK Black Pride	London, England	www.ukblackpride.org.uk	August	2006
Bi Pride UK	London, England	biprideuk.org	September	2017
GFest – gayWise LGBT Arts Festival	London, England	www.gaywisefestival.org.uk	November	2006
Sparkle Weekend	Manchester, England	www.sparkle.org.uk	July	2005
Manchester Pride	Manchester, England	www.manchesterpride.com	August Bank Holiday	
SuperGay	Middlesbrough, England	www.visitmiddlesbrough.com	September	2007
Mr Gay UK	Blackpool, England	www.mrgayuk.co.uk	May–July	1993
Mr Gay Wales	Cardiff, Wales	www.mrgaywales.com	May–July	2005
Northern Pride	Newcastle upon Tyne, England	www.northern-pride.com	July 17	2010
Nottingham Pride	Nottingham, England	www.nottinghamshirepride.co.uk	July	1999
Outsiders LGBT Film Festival	Liverpool, England	www.outsidersfilmfestival.com	Monthly (Main festival in October)	2004
Oxford Pride	Oxford, England	oxfordpride.uk	First Saturday in June	2003
Cambridge Pink Festival	Cambridge, England	thepinkfestival.co.uk		
Pride Blackpool	Blackpool, England	prideblackpool.co.uk	May/June	2006
Pride Canterbury	Canterbury, Kent, England	pridecanterbury.com	June	2016
Pride in Newry	Newry, Northern Ireland	prideinnewry.com	August/September	2011
Pride In Surrey	Surrey, England	prideinsurrey.org	August 10	2019
Pride Glasgow	Glasgow, Scotland	prideglasgow.com	August 30, 2008	
Pride Scotia	Edinburgh, Scotland	prideedinburgh.org.uk	Early summer, alternates bi-annually between Edinburgh and Glasgow	
Pride in Plymouth	Plymouth, England	prideinplymouth.org.uk	July 7	2007
Pride in Sheffield	Sheffield, England	prideinsheffield.org.uk	July	2008
Queer Contact	Manchester, England	www.contactmcr.com	Annual festival each Feb, events throughout year	2009
Queer Spirit Festival	Devon, England	queerspirit.net/festival	July 26–30, 2017	2017
Rainbow Film Festival - Shropshire Lesbian and Gay Film Festival	Shrewsbury, Shropshire	www.rainbowfilmfestival.org.uk	October	2006
Reading Pride	Reading, England	www.readingpride.co.uk	September	
Salisbury Pride UK	Salisbury, Wiltshire	www.salisburyprideuk.org	May	
Sparkle (transgender celebration)	Manchester, England	www.sparkle.org.uk	June / July	2005
Stoke-on-Trent Pride	Stoke-on-Trent, England	www.stokeontrentpride.org.uk	August	2011
Suffolk Pride	Ipswich, England	suffolklgbtnetwork.org.uk		2009
Swansea Pride	Swansea, Wales	www.swanseapride.co.uk	Last Saturday in June	2009
Swindon & Wiltshire Pride	Swindon, Wiltshire	www.swindonwiltshirepride.co.uk	First Saturday in August	2008
Tantra Love Festival UK	Glastonbury, UK	tantra4gaymen.co.uk/tantra-love-festival-uk	August 25 to 29	2018
Thanet Pride	Thanet, England	thanetpride.co.uk		
Totnes Pride	Totnes, Devon	www.totnespride.uk	September	2013
Worthing Pride	Worthing, England	worthingpride.com/	July	2018
Wrexham Pride	Wrexham, Wales	pridewrecsam.org	Last Saturday in July	2024
York Pride	York, England	yorkpride.org.uk	June 1, 2013	2002
North Wales Pride	Bangor, Gwynedd	www.facebook.com/CymruPrideWales	October 5 - October 7	2012
We Are: Proud	Bristol, England	www.wearefest.com	July 7 - July 14	2012
Wakefield LGBT Pride	Wakefield, West Yorkshire	www.wakefieldlgbtqpride.org	Second Sunday in August	2005
Eastleigh Pride	Eastleigh, Hampshire	www.eastleighpride.org.uk	September	2018

== North America ==
LGBT event	Location	Official website	Occurs every	Start
=== Canada ===
Acadie Love	Caraquet, New Brunswick	acadielove.ca	July	
Alberni Valley Pride	Port Alberni, British Columbia	alberni-valley-pride-society	June/July	
Annapolis Royal Pride	Annapolis County, Nova Scotia	annapolisroyalpride.ca	July	
Barrie Pride	Barrie, Ontario	barriepride.org	June	2013
Bay of Quinte Pride	Belleville, Prince Edward County, and Quinte West, Ontario	bayofquintepride.ca	June	
Brandon Pride	Brandon, Manitoba			
Brantford Pride	Brantford, Ontario			
Brockville Pride	Brockville, Ontario			
Calgary Pride	Calgary, Alberta	pridecalgary.ca	Late August	
Campbell River Pride	Campbell River, British Columbia			
Capital Pride (Ottawa)	Ottawa, Ontario	capitalpride.ca	Mid August	1986
Central Alberta Pride	Red Deer, Alberta	centralalbertapride.ca	August	
Cornwall Pride	Cornwall, Ontario			
Cranbrook Pride	Cranbrook, British Columbia			
Dawson Creek Pride	Dawson, British Columbia			
Divers/Cité	Montreal, Quebec		July/August	
Edmonton Pride	Edmonton, Alberta	edmontonpridefest.com	August	
Elgin Pride	St. Thomas, Ontario			
Elk Valley Pride	Fernie, British Columbia			
Elliot Lake Pride	Elliot Lake, Ontario	elpride.ca	May/June	
Fairy Tales International Queer Film Festival	Calgary, Alberta	fairytalesfilmfest.com	June	1999
Fête Arc-en-ciel	Quebec City, Quebec	arcencielquebec.ca	Labor day weekend	
Fierté Montréal	Montreal, Quebec	fiertemtl.com	Mid August	
Fierté Sherbrooke	Sherbrooke, Quebec			
Fierté Simcoe Pride	Simcoe County, Ontario	simcoepride.com	July/August	2012
Flin Flon Pride	Flin Flon, Manitoba			
Fort McMurray Pride	Fort McMurray, Alberta			
Fort St. John Pride Walk	Fort St. John, British Columbia			
Fraser Valley Pride	Abbotsford, British Columbia	fvpride.ca	July	2013
Fredericton Pride	Fredericton, New Brunswick	frederictonpride.com	July	2010
Friends for Life Bike Rally	Toronto to Montreal	bikerally.org	July	1999
Grande Prairie Pride	Grande Prairie, Alberta	grandeprairiepridesociety.com	June	
Grey Bruce Pride	Grey County-Bruce County, Ontario			
Guelph Pride	Guelph, Ontario	guelphpride.com	June and February	2003
Haida Gwaii Pride	Masset, British Columbia			
Halifax Pride	Halifax, Nova Scotia	halifaxpride.com	July	1988
Halton Pride	Burlington-Oakville, Ontario			
Huronia Pride	Midland-Penetanguishene, Ontario			
Image+Nation	Montreal, Quebec	image-nation.org	November	1987
Inside Out Film and Video Festival	Ottawa and Toronto, Ontario	insideout.ca		
Iqaluit Pride	Iqaluit, Nunavut			
Jasper Pride	Jasper, Alberta	jasperpride.ca	April	
Kamloops Pride	Kamloops, British Columbia			
Kawartha Lakes Pride	Kawartha Lakes, Ontario			
Kelowna Pride	Kelowna, British Columbia			
Kenora Pride	Kenora, Ontario			
Kingston Pride	Kingston, Ontario			
Kootenay Pride	Nelson, British Columbia			
Lanark Pride	Lanark County, Ontario			
Lethbridge Pride Fest	Lethbridge, Alberta	lethbridgepride.ca	June	2009
London Lesbian Film Festival	London, Ontario	llff.ca		
Medicine Hat Pride	Medicine Hat, Alberta			
Miramichi Pride	Miramichi, New Brunswick			
Moose Jaw Pride	Moose Jaw, Saskatchewan			
Mr. Leather Ottawa	Ottawa, Ontario	ottawaknights.com		1992
Mr. Vancouver Leather	Vancouver, British Columbia	vancouvermeninleather.ca	November	
Muskoka Pride	Muskoka District, Ontario			
Naked Heart Festival	Toronto, Ontario	nakedheart.ca	December/January	2015
Nanaimo Pride	Nanaimo, British Columbia	nanaimopride.ca		
New West Pride	New Westminster, British Columbia	newwestpride.ca	August	August 2010
North Bay Pride	North Bay, Ontario			
Okotoks Pride	Okotoks, Alberta	okotokspride.com	June	
Peak Pride	Kamloops-Kelowna, British Columbia			
Peel Pride	Mississauga-Brampton, Ontario			
Peterborough Pride	Peterborough, Ontario	peterboroughpride.ca	September	
Pictou Pride	Pictou-New Glasgow, Nova Scotia			
Pride Cape Breton	Sydney, Nova Scotia			
Pride Durham	Oshawa, Ontario			
Pride Hamilton	Hamilton, Ontario	pridehamilton.com	June	
Pride London Festival	London, Ontario	pridelondon.ca	July	
Pride Niagara	Niagara Region, Ontario	prideniagara.com	May/June	2010
Pride North of 55	Thompson, Manitoba			
Pride PEI	Charlottetown, Prince Edward Island	pridepei.ca	July	1994
Pride NWT	Yellowknife, Northwest Territories			
Pride Portage la Prairie	Portage la Prairie, Manitoba			
Pride Toronto	Toronto, Ontario	pridetoronto.com	June	1981
Pride Winnipeg	Winnipeg, Manitoba	pridewinnipeg.com	May/June	1987
Prince Albert Pride	Prince Albert, Saskatchewan			
Prince George Pride	Prince George, British Columbia			
Prism Toronto	Toronto, Ontario	prismfesttoronto.com		
Qathet Pride Society	qathet Regional District, British Columbia	qathetpride.ca	August	
Queen City Pride	Regina, Saskatchewan	queencitypride.ca	June	1990
Queer Arts Festival	Vancouver, British Columbia	queerartsfestival.com	June	1998
Queer City Cinema	Regina, Saskatchewan	queercitycinema.ca	September	1996
Queer North Film Festival	Sudbury, Ontario			
Quesnel Pride	Quesnel, British Columbia			
Rainbow Reels Queer and Trans Film Festival	Waterloo, Ontario	rainbowreels.ca		2000
Rainbow Visions Film Festival	Edmonton, Alberta	rainbowvisions.ca		
River of Pride	Moncton, New Brunswick	riverofpride.com	August/September	2000
Reel Pride	Winnipeg, Manitoba	reelpride.org	September	1987
Reelout Queer Film Festival	Kingston, Ontario	reelout.com		
Saint John Pride	Saint John, New Brunswick			
St. John's Pride	St. John's, Newfoundland and Labrador			
Salt Spring Island Pride	Salt Spring Island, British Columbia			
Saskatoon Pride	Saskatoon, Saskatchewan	saskatoonpride.ca	June	
Sault Pridefest	Sault Ste Marie, Ontario		July	2014
Smithers Pride	Smithers, British Columbia			
Steinbach Pride	Steinbach, Manitoba			
South Okanagan Similkameen Pride	Penticton, British Columbia			
Southwest Saskatchewan Pride	Swift Current, Saskatchewan	southwestsaskpride.com	June	
Sudbury Pride	Greater Sudbury, Ontario	sudburypride.com	July/August	1997
Sunshine Coast Pride	Roberts Creek, British Columbia	sunshinecoastpride.com		
Surrey Pride	Surrey, British Columbia	surreypride.ca	June	2016
Texada Rock in Pride	Texada Island, British Columbia			
Thunder Pride	Thunder Bay, Ontario	thunderpride.ca	July	2010
Timmins Pride	Timmins, Ontario	timminspride.com		
Toronto Leather Pride	Toronto, Ontario	torontoleatherpride.ca	Second Weekend of August	
Tri-Pride (Cambridge, Kitchener, Waterloo)	Waterloo Region, Ontario	tri-pride.ca	May/June	1995
Valley Pride	Wolfville and Kentville in Nova Scotia	avalleypride.ca	July	
Vancouver Pride Festival	Vancouver, British Columbia	vancouverpride.ca	July	
Vancouver Queer Film & Video Festival	Vancouver, British Columbia	outonscreen.com	August	
Victoria Pride Festival	Victoria, British Columbia	victoriapridesociety.org	July	1994
Western Pride	Corner Brook, Newfoundland and Labrador			
Whistler Pride	Whistler, British Columbia	whistlerpridefestival.com		
Windsor-Essex Pride Fest	Windsor, Ontario	wepridefest.com	August 6–11	2019
Yarmouth Pride	Yarmouth, Nova Scotia			
York Pride	Richmond Hill, Ontario			
Yukon Pride	Whitehorse, Yukon	queeryukon.com		
=== Greenland ===
Nuuk Pride	Nuuk		June	2010
=== Mexico ===
Cancún Pride	Cancún, Quintana Roo	www.facebook.com/cancunpride/	June	2003
Cinema Queer Mexico	Mexico City	https://cinemaqueermx.org	September, October	2018
Mexico City Pride Marcha del Orgullo LGBT	Mexico City		June	1979
Vallarta Pride	Puerto Vallarta, Jalisco	www.vallartapride.com	May	
Diversciudad (Cultural Festival and LGBT Pride)	Monterrey, Nuevo Leon	https://www.facebook.com/DiversciudadMonterrey/	June 19–29, 2016	
Monterrey Queer Film Exhibition (Muestra de Cine Queer)	Monterrey, Nuevo Leon	http://www.conarte.org.mx/lugares/cineteca	July	2011
Guadalajara Gay Getaway Weekend	Guadalajara, Jalisco	guad.8m.net/custom.html	September	
=== Puerto Rico ===
Boquerón Pride	Boquerón		June 14, 2015	
Pride Puerto Rico	San Juan		June (Last Sunday)	1990
Puerto Rico Queer Filmfest	San Juan	www.puertoricoqueerfilmfest.com	November	
=== United States ===
AIDS Walk Miami	Miami, Florida	qgiv.com	April	1989
AIDS Walk New York	New York City, New York	ny.aidswalk.net	May	1986
Albuquerque Pride	Albuquerque, New Mexico	abqpride.com	June	
Aqua Girl	Miami, Florida	aquafoundation.org	May	
Art for AIDS	San Francisco, California	alliancehealthproject.ucsf.edu/art-for-aids	September or October	1996
Aspen Gay Ski Week	Aspen, Colorado	gayskiweek.com	January (3rd Week)	1977
Atlanta Black Pride	Atlanta, Georgia	atlantaprideweekend.com	September, Labor Day Weekend	
Atlanta Out on Film	Atlanta, Georgia	www.outonfilm.org	October	
Atlanta Pride	Atlanta, Georgia	atlantapride.org	October	1971
Atlantic Stampede Rodeo	Gaithersburg, Maryland	www.asgra.org	September	
Augusta Pride	Augusta, Georgia	prideaugusta.org	June	2010
Austin International Drag Festival	Austin, Texas	austindragfest.org	May 1–3, 2015	2015
Austin Pride	Austin, Minnesota	austinmnpride.com	October	2023
Austin Pride Parade	Austin, Texas	austinpride.org	June	
Bait NYC Pride	New York, New York	baitnyc.com	June 23–26	2015
Baltimore Pride	Baltimore, Maryland	baltimorepride.org	July 25–26	
Bear Bust	Orlando, Florida	www.bearbust.org	October	1990
Bear Invasion	Washington, D.C.	www.bearinvasion.com	August	
BECAUSE Bisexual+ conference	Minneapolis, St. Paul, Minnesota	becauseconference.org	October	1992
Bellingham Pride (Pride IN Bellingham)	Bellingham, Washington	www.prideinbellingham.org	July	2001
Bemidji Pride	Bemidji, Minnesota	bemidjipride.com	August	2021
Bethlehem Pride Festival	Bethlehem, New York	https://bethlehempride.com/	June	2024
Big Sky Pride	Montana (rotates annually among major Montana towns)	www.bigskypride.com	June	
Binghamton Pride Palooza	Binghamton, New York	www.facebook.com	June	
Blue Ball	Philadelphia, Pennsylvania	www.blueballphilly.com	May	
Blue Ridge Pride	Asheville, North Carolina	www.blueridgepride.org	September	1998
Boise Pride	Boise, Idaho	www.boisepridefest.org	June	
Bronx Pride	Bronx, New York	www.bronxpride.org	June	
Brooklyn Pride	Brooklyn, New York	brooklynpride.org	June	
Buffalo Pride Festival	Buffalo, New York	buffaloprideweek.com	June	
Boston Pride	Boston, Massachusetts	bostonpride.org	June	
Capital Pride	Washington, D.C.	www.capitalpride.org	June	1975
Capital Pride (Albany, NY)	Albany, New York	518capitalpride.com	June	1997
Capital City Pride	Olympia, Washington	www.capitalcitypride.net	June	1991
Cedar Rapids Pridefest	Cedar Rapids, Iowa	crpridefest.com	June	1997
Celebration of Courage	New York, New York	www.iglhrc.org	March 15, 2010	
Celebration of Courage	San Francisco, California	www.iglhrc.org	March 18, 2010	1970
Central Alabama Pride	Birmingham, Alabama	www.centralalabamapride.org	June	1979
Central Arkansas Pride	Little Rock, Arkansas	www.lrpride.com	October	
Central New York Pride	Syracuse, New York	www.cnypride.org	June (see our site for exact date)	1996
Central Wisconsin Pride	Aniwa Wisconsin	www.centralwipride.org	June	2020
Charlotte County Pride	Punta Gorda, Florida	charlottecountypridefl.org (archived) (now allrainbowandalliedyouth.org)	January	2013
Charlotte Gay Film Fest	Charlotte, North Carolina	charlottelgbtfilm.com	April	1991
Charlotte Pride	Charlotte, North Carolina	www.charlottepride.org	August	2001
Charleston Pride Festival	Charleston, South Carolina	www.charlestonpride.org		2010
Cherry Weekend	Washington, D.C.	cherrydc.com	June	
Chesapeake Pride Festival	Edgewater, Maryland	www.chesapeakepridefestival.org	August (next is August 7. 2010)	2006
Chicago Bear Pride	Chicago, Illinois	www.glbears.com	May	
Chicago Pride Parade	Chicago, Illinois	pridechicago.org	June	1970
Christopher Street West	West Hollywood, Los Angeles, California	www.lapride.org	June	1970
Cincinnati Pride	Cincinnati, Ohio	www.cincinnatipride.org	June	1973
Cleveland Pride	Cleveland, Ohio	www.clevelandpride.org	June	
Cleveland Black Pride, BGP	Cleveland, Ohio	www.bgpcleveland.com	August	
Cleveland Leather Annual Weekend	Columbus, Ohio	www.clawinfo.org	April (2027 event in August)	2002
Colorado Springs PrideFest	Colorado Springs, Colorado	www.cospridefest.com	July (3rd weekend)	1990
Colors Light San Diego Rodeo	San Diego, California	www.sandiegorodeo.com	June	
Colossus Weekend	San Francisco, California	www.guspresents.com	June	
Columbus Pride	Columbus, Ohio	columbuspride.org	June 18–20	1981
Come Out With Pride	Orlando, Florida	www.comeoutwithpride.com	October	2004
Pride in the Park - Connecticut's Pride Festival	Norwalk, Connecticut	www.ctpridecenter.org	June	2014
Connecticut LGBTQ Film Festival	Hartford, Connecticut	outfilmct.org	May–June	1988
Conway Pride	Conway, Arkansas	conwaypride.com	June	2004
Dallas Pride	Dallas, Texas	dallaspride.org	September	1972
Dallas Black Pride	Dallas, Texas	www.dallassouthernpride.com	October	1996
Duluth-Superior Pride	Duluth, Minnesota	duluthsuperiorpride.com	August	1981
PrideFest	Des Moines, Iowa	capitalcitypride.org/	June	1977
Teddy Bear Party	Dallas, Texas	teddybearparty.org	December	2011
D.C. Black Pride	Washington, D.C.	dcblackpride.org	May	1991
Delaware Pride	Rehoboth Beach, Delaware	www.delawarepride.org	June	
Dinah Shore Weekend	Palm Springs, California	dinahshoreweekend.com	March/April	1987
East-Central Minnesota Pride	Pine City, Minnesota	eastcentralminnesotapride.org	June	2005
El Paso Sun City Pride	El Paso, Texas	www.suncitypride.org	August	
Equality Forum	Philadelphia, Pennsylvania	www.equalityforum.com	May–June	
Erie Pride Fest	Erie, Pennsylvania	www.nwpapride.org	August	
Eugene/Springfield Pride Festival	Eugene, Oregon	www.eugenepride.org	Second Saturday in August	1981
Evolve Vegas NYE	Las Vegas	www.evolvevegasnye.com	December, New Year's Eve	2014
Fantasia Fair	Provincetown, Massachusetts	fanfair.info	October	
Fantasy Fest	Key West, Florida	www.fantasyfest.com	October	
Fargo-Moorhead Pride	Moorhead, Minnesota	fmpride.org	June	2005
Fergus Pride	Fergus Falls, Minnesota		August	2022
FilmOut San Diego	San Diego, California	filmoutsandiego.com	April	
Finger Lakes Pride	Geneva, New York	www.facebook.com/FLXPride/	May	
Florida AIDS Walk & Music Festival	Ft. Lauderdale, Florida	www.floridaaidswalk.org	April	
Folsom Street East	New York City, New York	www.folsomstreeteast.org	June	1997
Folsom Street Fair	San Francisco, California	www.folsomstreetevents.org/folsom-street-fair	September	
Fort Wayne Pride	Fort Wayne, Indiana	www.fwpride.org	July	1998
Frameline	San Francisco, California	www.frameline.org	June	
Fresno Rainbow Pride	Fresno, California	www.fresnorainbowpride.com	June	1991
The Gay Christian Network Conference	Varies Annually	www.gcnconf.com	January	
Gay8 Festival: the largest Hispanic LGBTQ Festival in the United States	Miami "Little Havana," Florida	www.gay8festival.com	February	2016
Gay Days at Walt Disney World	Orlando, Florida	www.gaydays.com	June	1991
Gay Easter Parade	New Orleans, Louisiana	www.gayeasterparade.com	March	
Gay Spring Break	Key West, Florida		February–April	
Gillette Pride	Gillette, Wyoming		July	2014
Grand Rapids Pride Festival	Grand Rapids, Michigan	grpride.org	June	1988
Greensboro Pride Festival	Greensboro, North Carolina	greensboropride.org	June	2006
Halloween New Orleans	New Orleans, Louisiana	www.gayhalloween.com	October	
Hampton Roads Pride	Norfolk, Virginia	hamptonroadspride.org	June	1986
Harlem Pride	Harlem, New York	harlempride.org	June	2010
Harvey Milk Festival	Sarasota, Florida	harveymilkfestival.org	May	2010
HavenCon	Austin, Texas	havencontx.org	April	
Headdress Ball	Key West, Florida	gaykeywestfl.com/headdress-ball	October	
Heartland Pride Festival and Parade	Omaha, Nebraska	heartlandpride.org	June	2010
Heartland Transgender Fall Party	Oklahoma City, Oklahoma	www.heartlandtg.com	November	2006
Heartland Transgender Spring Soiree	Oklahoma City, Oklahoma	www.heartlandtg.com	May	2007
Heavy Hitters Pride	Houston, Texas	www.heavyhitterspride.com	July	2014
Heritage of Pride	New York City, New York	www.nycpride.org	June	1969
Hermosa Beach Pride	Hermosa Beach, California	hbpride.org	June	2021
Honolulu Rainbow Film Festival	Honolulu, Hawaii	www.hglcf.org	May	1989
Houston Gay Rodeo	Houston, Texas	tgra.org	October	
Houston Pride	Houston, Texas	pridehouston.org	June	1979
Hudson Valley Pride	New Paltz, New York	www.lgbtqcenter.org	June	
Idapalooza Fruit Jam	Tennessee rural music & arts festival for radical queers	www.planetida.com	early June	
Indianapolis LGBT Film Festival	Indianapolis, Indiana	www.indylgbtfilmfest.com	November	2000
Indy Pride Festival	Indianapolis, Indiana	www.indypride.org	June	1988
International Bear Convergence	Palm Springs, California	ibc-ps.com	February	
International Bear Rendezvous	San Francisco, California	www.bosf.org	February	
International Gay & Lesbian Festival	Philadelphia, Pennsylvania	www.phillyfests.com	July	
International Mr. Leather	Chicago, Illinois	www.imrl.com	May	1979
International Ms. Leather	San Francisco, California	www.imsl.org	April	1987
Itasca Pride	Grand Rapids, Minnesota	itascapride.org	June	2024
JAX Pride	Jacksonville, Florida	www.rivercitypride.org	October	1978
Jersey Pride	Asbury Park, New Jersey	www.jerseypride.org	June	
Jersey City Pride	Jersey City, New Jersey	jerseycitypride.com	August	
Kalamazoo Pride	Kalamazoo, Michigan	www.outfrontkzoo.org/pride	June	2007
Kaleidoscope LGBT Film Festival	North Little Rock, Arkansas	www.kaleidoscopefilmfestival.com	August	2015
Kansas City Pride	Kansas City, Missouri	www.kcpridefest.org	June	
Kenosha Pride	Kenosha, Wisconsin	www.kenoshapride.org	July	2013
Kentuckiana Pride	Louisville, Kentucky	kypride.com	October	2004
KinkFest	Portland, Oregon	www.kinkfest.org	March	
Knoxville PrideFest	Knoxville, Tennessee	knoxpride.com	June	
Kokomo Pride	Kokomo, Indiana	kokomopride.lgbt	June	2014
LA Bear Quake	Los Angeles, California	www.bearquake.com	July	
Lake Area Pride	Alexandria, Minnesota	lakesareapride.org	July	2022
Lake Tahoe Winterfest	Lake Tahoe, Nevada	www.laketahoewinterfest.com	March	
LancPride	Lancaster, Pennsylvania	www.lancpride.com	June	2008
Las Vegas Pride	Las Vegas, Nevada	lasvegaspride.org	May	1983
Lazy Bear Week	Guerneville, California	www.lazybearweek.org	July	
Liberty Open	New York City	metrotennisgroup.com/libertyopen	July	
Louisiana Queer Conference	Baton Rouge, Louisiana	lsu.edu/lgbtqproject/laqc/laqc.php	April	2011
Long Beach Pride	Long Beach, California	longbeachpride.com	May	1983
Long Island Pride	Huntington, New York	lipride.org, liprideparade.com		
Los Angeles Pride / Christopher Street West	West Hollywood, Los Angeles, California	lapride.org	June	1970
Los Angeles / Valley Pride	West Hollywood, California	www.lavalleypride.org	October	2000
Lowcountry PRIDE Parade and Celebration	Bluffton, South Carolina	www.lowcountrypride.org	June	2019
LUEY Weekend	Houston, Texas	www.lueyweekend.org	March	1973
Madison Pride and MAGIC Picnic	Madison, Wisconsin	www.outreachmagicfestival.org		
Magic City Equality Pride	Minot, North Dakota	magiccityequality.com	June	2014
Manatee County Pride Festival	Bradenton, Florida	manateepride.com	March	2014
Market Days	Chicago, Illinois		August	
Marshall Pride	Marshall, Minnesota	marshallpride.org	June	2021
Medusa Festival Weekend	Atlanta, Georgia	medusaproductionsatl.com	February	2021
Memorial Day Pensacola Beach Pride	Pensacola, Florida	johnnychisholm.com	May	
Miami Beach Pride	South Beach, Florida	miamibeachpride.com	April	2009
Michigan LGBT ComedyFest	Dearborn, Michigan	motorcitypride.org/comedyfest18-2	March	
Mid-Atlantic Leather Weekend	Washington, D.C.	www.leatherweekend.com	Mid-January (Martin Luther King, Jr. Day Weekend)	1985
Mid-Columbia Pride	Pasco, Washington	www.midcolumbiapride.com	June	
Mid-South Pride	Memphis, Tennessee	midsouthpride.org		
Milwaukee LGBT Film & Video Festival	Milwaukee, Wisconsin	uwm.edu/lgbtfilmfestival	September	
Minnesota AIDS Walk	Minneapolis, Minnesota	mnaidswalk.org	May	1987
Mix NYC	New York City	www.mixnyc.org	April	
Modesto Pride	Modesto, California	www.spcpride.org	September	
Monterey Peninsula Pride	Monterey, California	www.montereypeninsulapride.org	July	
Montgomery PRIDE	Montgomery, Alabama	montgomeryprideunited.org	June 16–23	
Motor City Pride	Detroit, Michigan	www.motorcitypride.org	Second Sunday in June	
Muskogee Pride Festival	Muskogee, Oklahoma	www.okeq.org/muskogee.html	Yearly	July 20, 2019
Napa Valley Pride Ride	Napa County, California	http://winetrain.com/package/pride-ride/	Yearly, usually March	2016
Nashville Pride	Nashville, Tennessee	www.nashvillepride.org	June 20	1988
National Queer Arts Festival	San Francisco	queerculturalcenter.org	June	1998
Nevada Pride	Carson City, Nevada	https://breweryarts.org/event/20260613-nevada-pride/	June	2025
NewFest - NY LGBT Film Festival	New York City, New York	newfest.org	End of May – June	
New Jersey AIDS Walk	Ridgewood - Newark - Morristown - Asbury Park - Atlantic City, New Jersey	www.njaidswalk.org	May	2010
New York City Pride	New York City, New York	www.nycpride.org	June	1969
Noho Pride	Northampton, Massachusetts	www.nohopride.org	May	
North Carolina Pride	Durham, North Carolina	www.ncpride.org	September	1981
North Carolina Gay and Lesbian Film Festival	Durham, North Carolina	http://www.carolinatheatre.org/films/festivals/ncglff	August	
Northern Colorado Pride	Colorado (Fort Collins, Greeley, Loveland and Surrounding areas.)	www.nocoequality.org	July/August	2015
Northern Nevada Pride	Reno, Nevada	https://northernnevadapride.org/	September	1987
NWA Pride	Fayetteville, Arkansas	nwapride.org	June	2006
Octobearfest	Denver, Colorado	octobearfest.org	October	
Oklahoma City Pride Festival and Parade	Oklahoma City, Oklahoma	www.oklahomacitypride.org	June	1988
One Magical Weekend	Orlando, Florida - Walt Disney World	www.onemagicalweekend.com	June (First Weekend)	1990
Orange County Pride	Santa Ana, California	www.prideoc.com	June	1989
Orlando Black Pride	Orlando, Florida	www.orlandoblackpride.com	May	2002
Orlando Bear Bash	Orlando, Florida	www.orlandobearbash.com	September	2010
Out at the Fair	Sacramento, California - Albuquerque, New Mexico - San Rafael, California - San Diego, California - Santa Clara, California	www.outatthefair.com	Various dates throughout the year	2011
Out in Science, Technology, Engineering, and Mathematics, Inc. (oSTEM)	Chicago, Illinois	ostem.org/page/conference	November	2011
Out on the Mountain	Valencia, California	www.outonthemountain.com	August	2008
OutBoard: Gay and Lesbian Snowboarding Event	Crested Butte, Colorado	www.outboard.org	March	
OutFest	Ann Arbor, Michigan	www.a2outfest.com	August	1995
OUTfest	Lafayette, Indiana	www.pridelafayette.org	August	2008
Outfest	Los Angeles, California	outfest.org	July	
OutFest Philadelphia	Philadelphia, Pennsylvania		October	
Out! Raleigh Pride	Raleigh, North Carolina	www.outraleighpride.org	June	
OUTshine Film Festival	Miami, Florida	outshinefilm.com	April	
Pacific Northwest Black Pride	Seattle, Washington	www.nwblackpride.org	July	
Palm Beach Pride Market	Lake Worth, Florida	thepalmbeaches.com/top-event/palm-beach-pride-market	June	
Palm Springs Pride	Palm Springs, California	pspride.org	November	
Palm Springs Summer Splash	Palm Springs, California	www.palmspringssummersplash.com	June through August	
Palouse Pride	Moscow, Idaho	www.myspace.com	August	
Paradise Conference	Atlanta, Georgia	theparadiseconference.org (archived)	October 23 and 24, 2020	
Philly Black Gay Pride	Philadelphia, Pennsylvania	www.phillyblackpride.org	April	1999
Philly Pride Parade & Festival	Philadelphia, Pennsylvania	www.phillypride.org	June	
Phoenix Pride	Phoenix, Arizona	phoenixpride.org	April	1981
Pig Week Fort Lauderdale	Fort Lauderdale, Florida	pigweek.com	First Sat. after Thanksgiving	2014
Pines Party	Fire Island, New York	pinesfi.com	July	
Pittsburgh Pride	Pittsburgh, Pennsylvania	www.pittsburghpride.org	June	
PrideFest	Denver, Colorado	denverpride.org		
Pridefest Fort Lauderdale	Ft. Lauderdale, Florida	pridefortlauderdale.org	March	1978
PrideFest Milwaukee	Milwaukee, Wisconsin	pridefest.com	June	
Pride Alive	Green Bay, Wisconsin	newpridealive.org	July	
Pride Corpus Christi	Corpus Christi, Texas	pridecorpuschristi.com	June	2017
Pride Fest	Bismarck, North Dakota and Mandan, North Dakota	dakotaoutright.org	Mid-summer	
Pride Festival of Central PA	Harrisburg, Pennsylvania	www.centralpapridefestival.com	Last weekend in July	1992
Pride in the Desert	Tucson, Arizona	tucsonpride.org	Third Saturday in October	
Pride in the Park Myrtle Beach	Myrtle Beach, South Carolina	pridemyrtlebeach.org	First Saturday in October	2019
Pride Northwest	Portland, Oregon	www.pridenw.org	June	
Pride! Portland	Portland, Maine	prideportland.org	June	1987
Pride San Antonio	San Antonio, Texas	www.pridesanantonio.org	June	2004
PRIDE Santa Fe	Santa Fe, New Mexico	http://www.hrasantafe.org/pride-events-2022/	June	
Provo Pride Parade	Provo, Utah	www.provopride.org	September	2013
Pure Heat Atlanta Pride Weekend	Atlanta, Georgia	atlantaprideweekend.com	Labor Day Weekend, Thursday through Tuesday	2006
Purple Party Weekend	Dallas, Texas	www.purplefoundation.org	May	2001
QFest	Houston, Texas	www.q-fest.com	September	1997
Queendom Atlanta Pride	Atlanta, Georgia	queendomatlanta.com	September 1–5	2013
QueerBomb Dallas	Dallas, Texas	www.queerbombdallas.org	June	2014
Querent: A Queer Spirituality Conference	Cincinnati, Ohio	www.querent.org	April	2017
Queens Pride Parade	New York City, New York	www.queenspride.org	June	1993
Range Iron Pride	Virginia, Minnesota	rangeironpride.org	August	2020
Rendezvous - Pride Camping Event	Cheyenne, Wyoming	www.rendezvouswyoming.org	August	
Rainbow Pride of West Virginia	Charleston, West Virginia	www.pridewv.org	June	1996
Reaching Out LGBT MBA & Business Student Conference	Multiple Locations	reachingoutmba.org	October	1999
Reel Affirmations LGBT Film Festival	Washington, D.C.	thedccenter.org/reelaffirmations	October	1992
Reno Pride	Reno, Nevada	www.renogaypride.com	August	1997
Rhode Island Pride Festival & Parade	Providence, Rhode Island	www.prideri.com	June	1976
Rites of Spring Parties	Birmingham, Alabama	www.ritesofspring.org	April	
Rochester Pride	Rochester, Minnesota	rochmnpride.org	May	1998
Rochester, NY Pride	Rochester, New York	outalliance.org	July	
Rocket City Pride	Huntsville, Alabama	www.rocketcitypride.com	June	
Sacramento Pride Festival & Parade	Sacramento, California	sacramentopride.org	June	1985
Salisbury Pride	Salisbury, North Carolina	www.salisburypride.org	June	2011
Salinas Valley Pride Parade	Salinas, California	www.salinasvalleypride.com	August	2007
San Diego Pride	San Diego, California	www.sandiegopride.org	July	1974
San Diego North County Pride	Carlsbad, California	www.pridebythebeach.org	August	1978
San Francisco Pride	San Francisco, California	www.sfpride.org	June	1970
San Francisco Transgender Film Festival	San Francisco, California	sftff.org	November	1997
Santa Cruz Pride Parade & Festival	Santa Cruz, California	santacruzpride.org	June	
Sarasota Pride	Sarasota, Florida	sarasotapride.org	October	
Savannah Pride	Savannah, Georgia	www.savannahpride.org	October	1999
Seattle Pride	Seattle, Washington	www.seattlepride.org	June	
Show Me Pride	Kansas City, Missouri		June 1–3	
Silicon Valley Pride Parade & Festival	San Jose, California	www.svpride.com	August 30	1975
Sin City Classic	Largest annual LGBT sporting event in the world - Las Vegas	www.sincityclassic.org	January	
Sizzle Miami	Miami, Florida	www.sizzlemiami.com	Memorial Day Weekend May Thursday – Monday	
Sonoma County Pride	Santa Rosa, California	www.sonomacountypride.org	June	1987
South Carolina Pride	Columbia, South Carolina	www.scpride.org		
South Central Minnesota Pride	Mankato, Minnesota	scmnpride.org	September	2006
South Eastern Queer Arts Week	Montgomery, Alabama and South East US	southeasternqueerarts.org	June 21–28, 2020 and September 21–28, 2020	
SouthEast LeatherFest	Atlanta, Georgia	seleatherfest.com	June	2003
Southwest Gay and Lesbian Film Festival	Albuquerque, New Mexico and Santa Fe, New Mexico	www.closetcinema.org	October	2003
Southern Decadence	New Orleans, Louisiana	www.southerndecadence.net	Labor Day weekend (September)	
South Georgia Pride	Valdosta, Georgia	www.southgapride.com	September	Third Saturday of every year
Spoiled Rotten LA Pride	Los Angeles, California	spoiledrottenla.com	October	
Spokane Pride	Spokane, Washington	spokanepride.org	2nd Saturday in June	
Springfield PrideFest	Springfield, Illinois	www.springfieldpride.org	May	2011
St. Cloud Pride	St. Cloud, Minnesota	stcpride.org	September	2010
St. Louis PrideFest	St. Louis, Missouri	www.pridestl.org	June	1979
St. Pete Pride	St. Petersburg, Florida	www.stpetepride.com	June	2003
Staten Island Pride	Staten Island, New York	www.myspace.com		
Stargayzer Festival	Austin, Texas	www.stargayzerfest.com	September 12–14, 2014	
SweetHeat Miami	Miami, Florida	www.sweetheatmiami.com	May 11–17	2008
Syracuse (CNY) Pride	Syracuse, New York	www.cnypride.org	June	
Tampa Bay International Gay and Lesbian Film Festival (TIGLFF)	Tampa Bay area, Florida	tiglff.com	October	1990
Tampa Pride	Tampa, Florida	tampapride.org	March	2015
Toledo Pride	Toledo, Ohio	toledopride.com	August	2010
Trans Stellar Film Festival	Detroit, Michigan	transstellarfilmfestival.com	September	2017
Tropical Heat Key West	Key West, Florida	gaykeywestfl.com/tropical-heat	August	
Tucson Pride	Tucson, Arizona	www.tucsonpride.org	October	
Twin Cities Pride	Minneapolis/Saint Paul, Minnesota	tcpride.org	June	1972
Tulsa Pride	Tulsa, Oklahoma	www.okeq.org/tulsa-pride.html	June	1982
United States Gay Open	San Francisco, California	gltf.org	May	
Utah Pride Festival	Salt Lake City, Utah	www.facebook.com/utahpridefestival/	June	1977
Virginia Pride	Richmond, Virginia	www.vapride.org	September	Yearly
White Party Miami	Miami, Florida	whiteparty.org	November	1985
White Party Week	Palm Springs, California	jeffreysanker.com	April	
Wichita Pride Festival & Parade	Wichita, Kansas	wichitapride.org	September	1972
Willmar Pride	Willmar, Minnesota	willmarlakesarea.com	June	2009/2025
Winter Party	South Beach, Florida	winterparty.com	March	
WomenFest	Key West, Florida	gaykeywestfl.com/womenfest	September	
Wright-Sherburne Pride	Monticello, Minnesota	wrightsherburnepride.com	July	2023
Yonkers Pride	Yonkers, New York	www.yonkerspridefest.org	June	2018
Youth Pride D.C. (youth pride event)	Washington, D.C.	www.youthpridedc.org	May	1996

== Oceania ==
LGBT event	Location	Official website	Occurs every	Start
=== Australia ===
Midsumma Festival	Melbourne	www.midsumma.org.au	January to February (but 19 April to 5 May 2021)	1989
Midsumma Carnival	Melbourne	www.midsumma.org.au	January	1989
Midsumma Pride March	Melbourne	www.midsumma.org.au	February (but 23 May 2021)	1996
Queer Collaborations	Varying States at universities	aqsn.org/queerelle-queer-collaborations	Usually July	1991
Mardi Gras – Fair Day	Victoria Park, Sydney	www.mardigras.org.au	February (12 February 2012)	1980
Sydney Mardi Gras	Oxford Street	www.mardigras.org.au	March (2 March 2013)	1978
Mardi Gras – Party	Sydney	www.mardigras.org.au	March (3 March 2012)	1978
Mardi Gras Film Festival	Sydney	queerscreen.org.au	February to March	
Mardi Gras – LGBTQI Festival	Sydney	www.mardigras.org.au	February to March	
Mardi Gras – Harbour Party	Sydney Botanical Gardens	www.mardigras.org.au	February (25 February 2012)	
Mardi Gras – Bondi Beach Drag Races	Sydney (Bondi Beach)	www.mardigras.org.au	February	
Mardi Gras – Pool Party	Sydney	www.mardigras.org.au	March	
Big Gay Weekend	Oxford Street	www.mardigras.org.au	October Long Weekend	2011
Sleaze Ball	Sydney	www.mardigras.org.au	Sept (on hold from 2010)	1982
Sydney Leather Pride	Sydney	www.sydneyleatherpride.org	May	
Brisbane Pride Festival	Brisbane	brisbanepride.org.au	June	1990
Chillout Festival	Daylesford, Victoria	www.chilloutfestival.com.au	March	
Geelong Pride Film Festival	Geelong, Victoria	www.gpff.org.au	April	2017
Darwin Pride	Darwin, Northern Territory	darwinpride.com.au	May	
FABalice Festival	Alice Springs, Northern Territory	www.fabalice.com	March	
Feast Festival	Adelaide	www.feast.org.au	November	1997
Adelaide Pride March	Adelaide	www.prideadelaide.org	September	1973
Melbourne Queer Film Festival	Melbourne	mqff.com.au	March (14–24 March 2013)	1991
Melbourne Leather Festival	Melbourne	www.melbourneleatherfestival.org	September	1995
Perth Pride Festival	Perth, Western Australia	www.pridewa.com.au	September	1990
Coastout	Coffs Harbour	www.coastout.com.au	October	
Wear it Purple Day	Australia	www.wearitpurple.org	Last Friday in August	2010
Big Gay Day	Brisbane	https://biggayday.com.au/	May	2000
=== New Zealand ===
Christchurch Pride	Christchurch	www.chchpride.co.nz	March	
Auckland Pride Festival	Auckland	aucklandpridefestival.org.nz	February	2013
Queenstown Gay Ski Week	Queenstown	www.gayskiweeknz.com	September	2003
Wellington Pride Festival	Wellington	www.wellingtonpridefestival.com		1986
A Rainbow in the Village – Paekakariki Pride Festival – Home of the World's Shortest Pride Parade (unofficial)	Paekākāriki	www.paekakarikipridefestival.org	October	2017

== South America ==
LGBT event	Location	Official website	Occurs every	Start
=== Argentina ===
Buenos Aires Pride	Buenos Aires	www.marchadelorgullo.org.ar	November	1992
International Gay/Lesbian/Trans Film Festival in Argentina	Buenos Aires	www.diversa.com.ar	October	2004
=== Brazil ===
Festival MixBrasil de Cinema e Video da Diversidade Sexual São Paulo	São Paulo	www.mixbrasil.org.br	November	1993
São Paulo Gay Pride Parade	São Paulo	paradasp.org.br	June	1996
Pride Parade Brasília	Brasília, Distrito Federal	www.mixbrasil.uol.com.br	July	1997
Pride Salvador	Salvador, Bahia	www.ggb.org.br	June	2002
Diversity Parade Florianópolis	Florianópolis, Santa Catarina	www.diversidadefloripa.com.br	September	2006
Pride Rio de Janeiro	Rio de Janeiro	www.pageoneq.com	October	1995
Rio Festival de Gênero & Sexualidade no Cinema	Rio de Janeiro	www.riofgsc.com.br/ (in Portuguese)	July	1995
DIGO Goiás Sexual Diversity and Gender International Film Festival	Goiânia GO	digofestival.com.br	June	2016
=== Chile ===
Marcha del Orgullo Gay	Santiago, Calama, La Serena, Talca, Concepción and Puerto Montt	www.movilh.cl	June	2001
AMOR Festival	Santiago	amorfestival.com	June	2016
Semana de la Visibilidad Lésbica y Bisexual	Santiago	www.rompiendoelsilencio.cl	July	2015
Marcha por la Diversidad Sexual	Santiago	mums.cl	September	1999
Marcha de la Diversidad Sexual	Valparaíso	www.acciongay.cl	September	2006
International LGBTI Film Festival (CINE MOVILH)	Santiago	www.movilh.cl/cine	October	2008
Marcha por la Diversidad Sexual	Iquique	fadise.blogspot.cl	October	2010
Gay Parade Chile, Open Mind Fest	Santiago	www.movilh.cl/gayparade	November	2006
=== Colombia ===
Marcha de la Ciudadania LGBT	Bogotá	www.colombialgbt.com	June	1996
Semana de la Diversidad Sexual y de Géneros	Bogotá	www.sdp.gov.co	October	2011
=== Ecuador ===
Cuenca Pride	Cuenca		June	2014
Guayaquil Pride	Guayaquil	orgulloguayaquil.com/	June	2009
Quito Pride	Quito	www.orguio.org	June	1999
=== Paraguay ===
Asunción Pride	Asunción	www.facebook.com/elcentrosomosgay	June	2004
=== Peru ===
Lima Pride	Lima	www.facebook.com/marchadelorgullolima	July	2001
=== Curaçao ===
Curacao Pre-Pride	Willemstad	www.curacaopride.org	June	2023
Curacao Pride	Willemstad	www.curacaopride.org	October	2012
=== Venezuela ===
Caracas Pride	Caracas	www.lambdavenezuela.org	May	2001
Ciclo de Cine de la Diversidad	Caracas, Maracaibo, San Cristóbal, Barquisimeto, Carúpano and Valencia	www.facebook.com/cinediversidad	June	2006
Pride Maracaibo	Maracaibo	www.pridemaracaibo.com	June	2010
Festival Venezolano de Cine de la Diversidad - FESTDIVQ	Caracas	festivalvenezolanodecinedeladiversidad.wordpress.com	October	2011

== Gallery ==
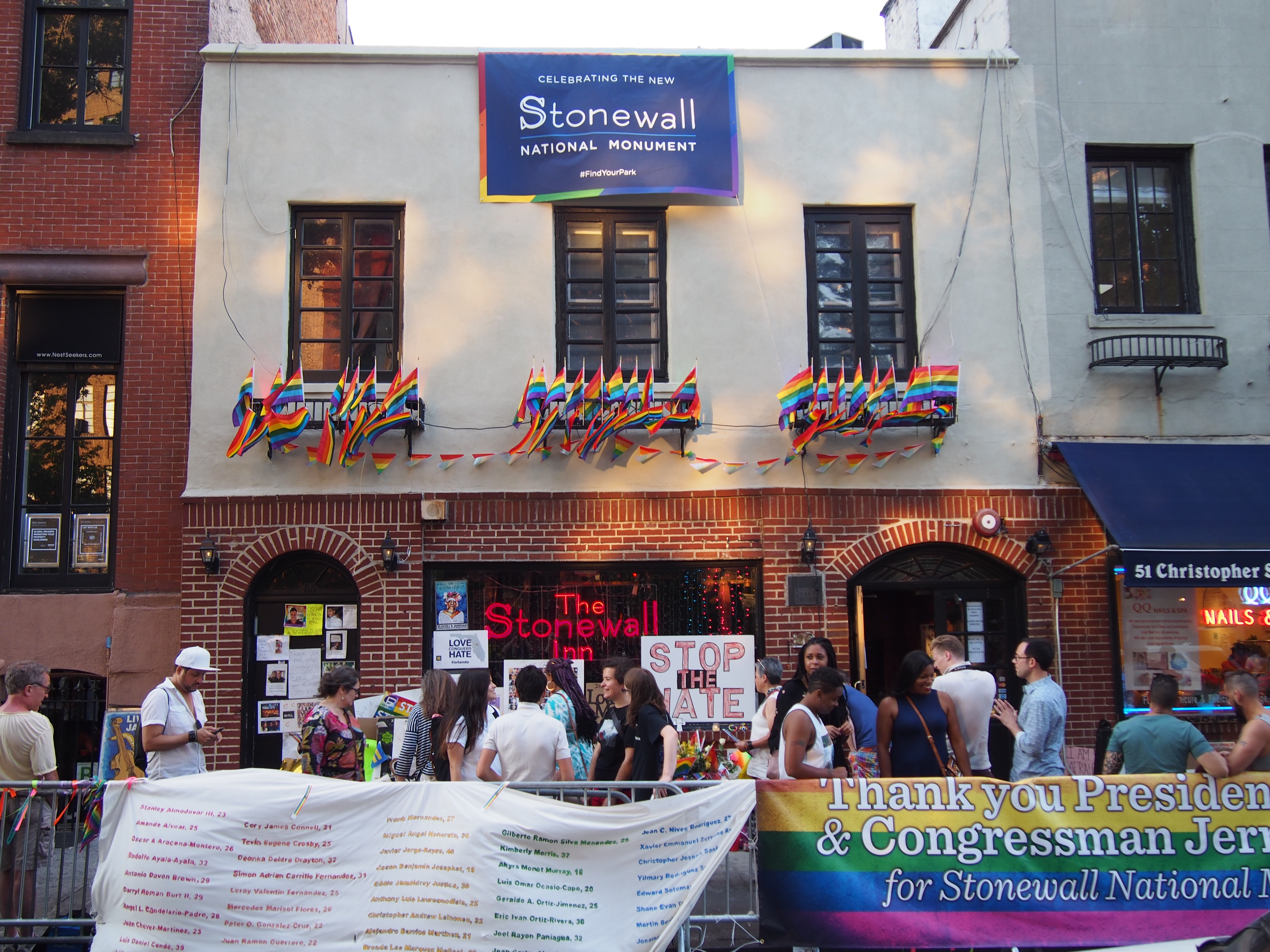
Facade of the Stonewall Inn, New York City, 2016

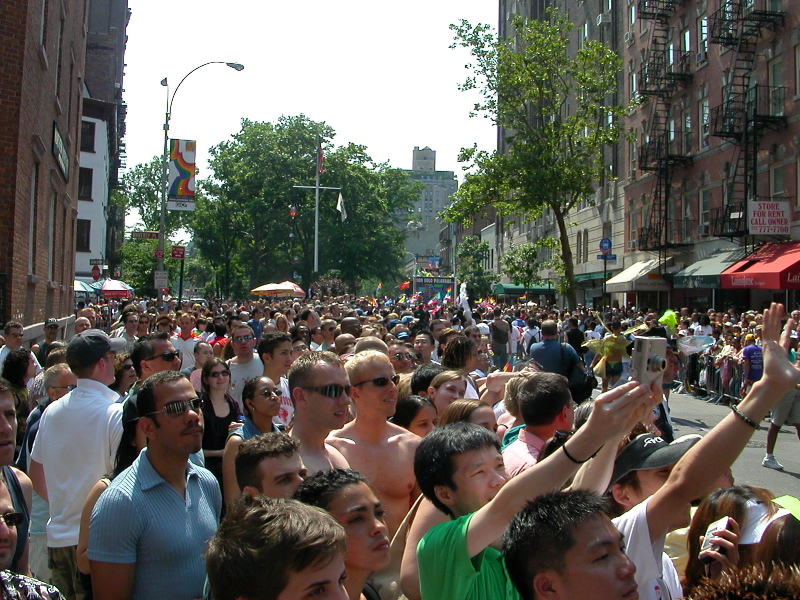
New York City Pride March, 2003

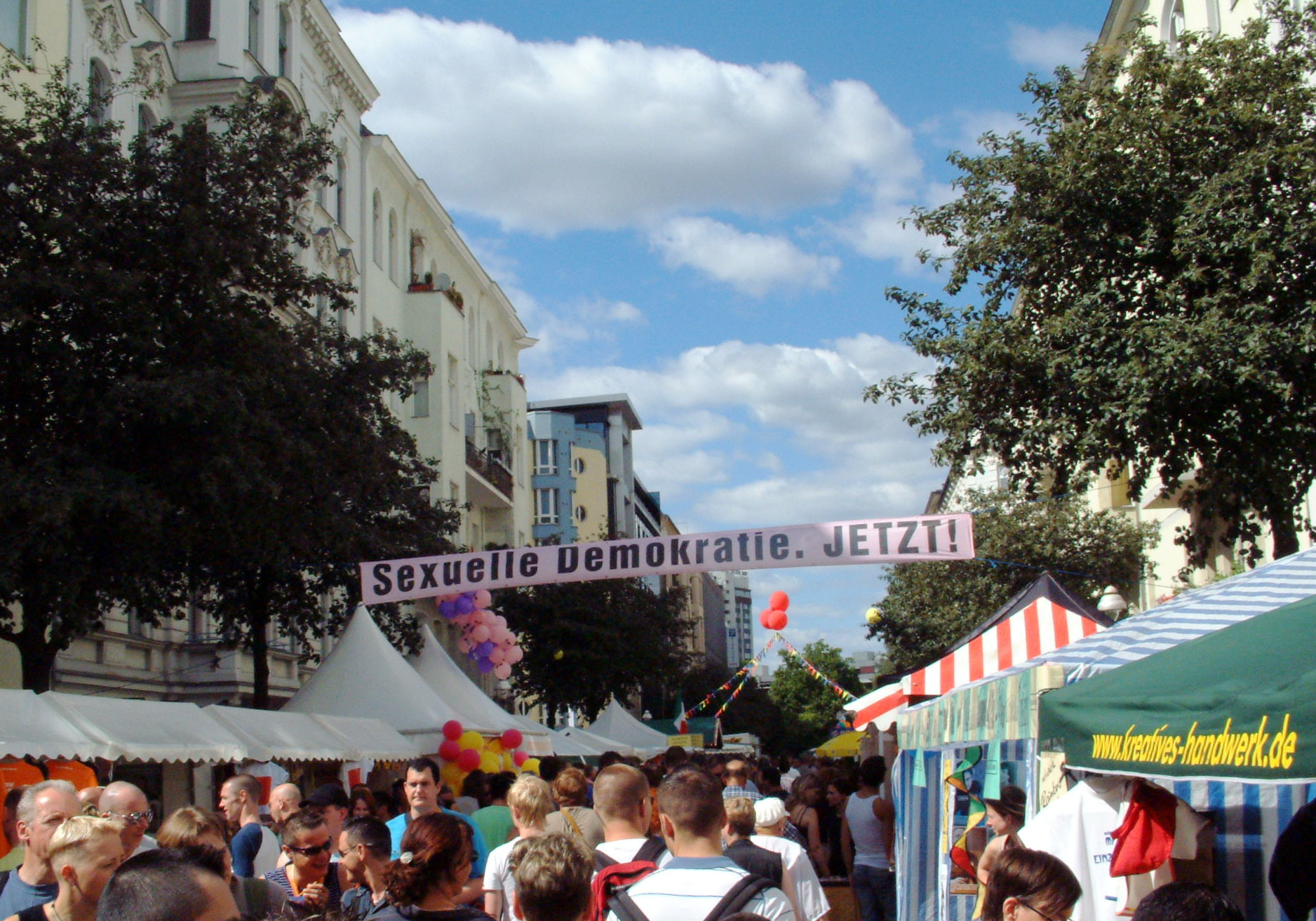
Lesbian and Gay City Festival in Germany, 2006

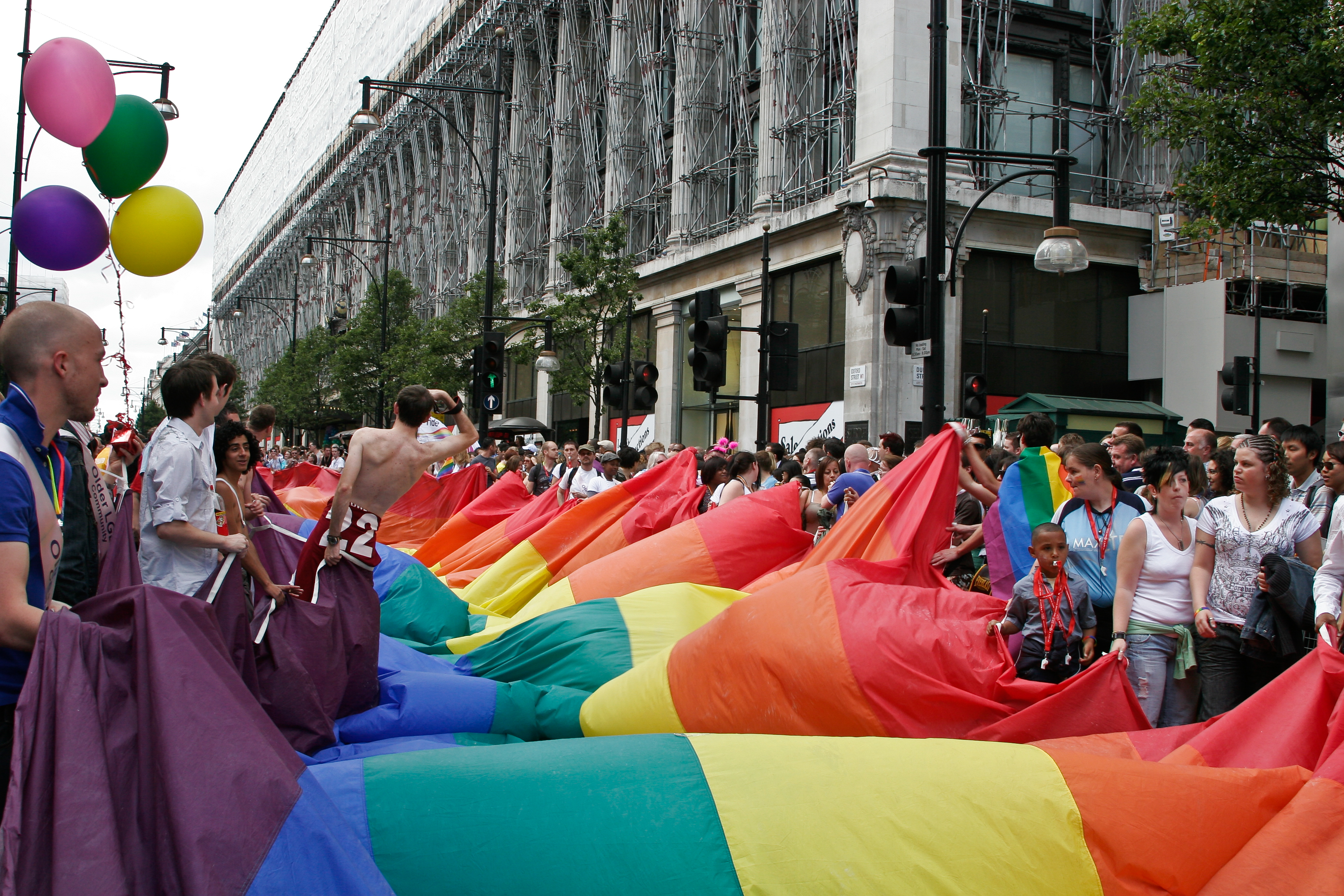
Pride in London 2008, the 100 m rainbow flag

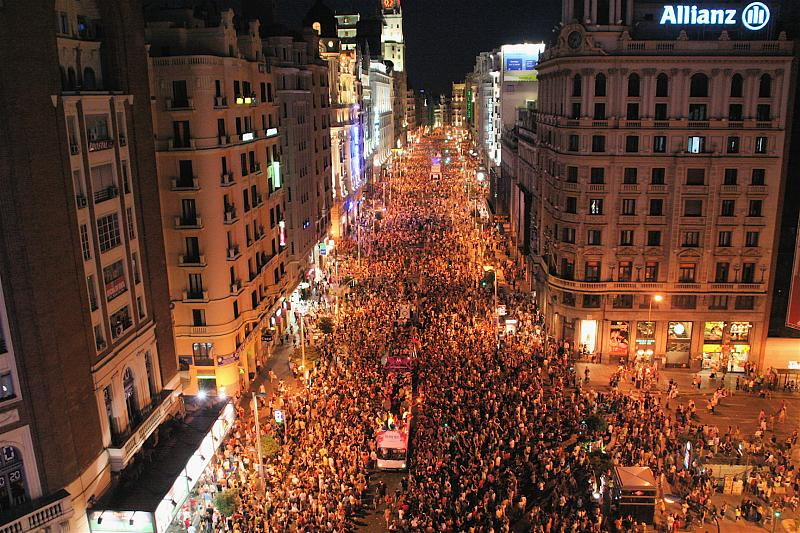
Downtown Madrid during the Madrid Pride parade, 2008

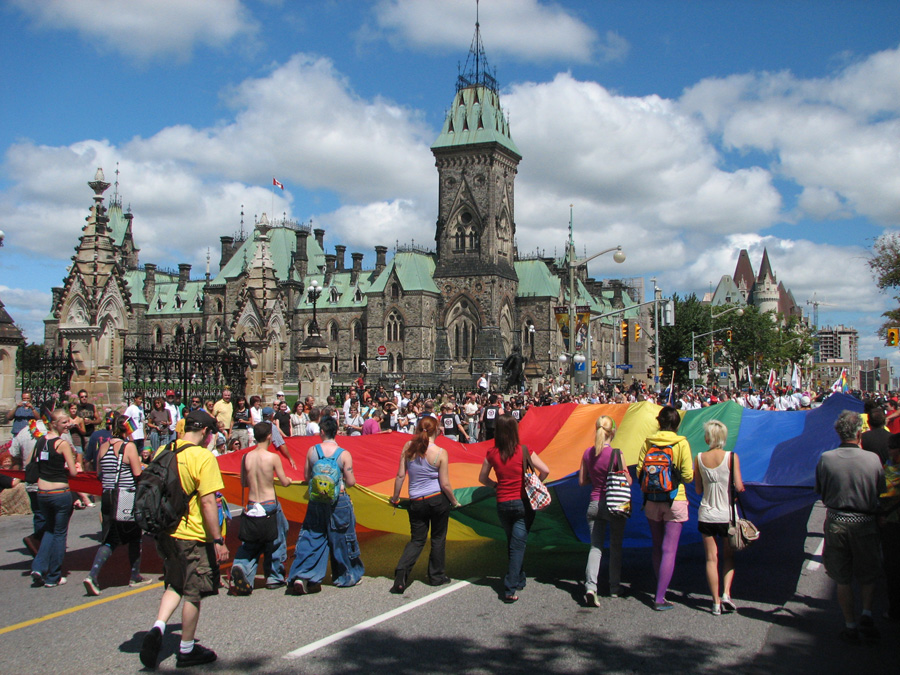
Ottawa Capital Pride parade in Canada, 2007

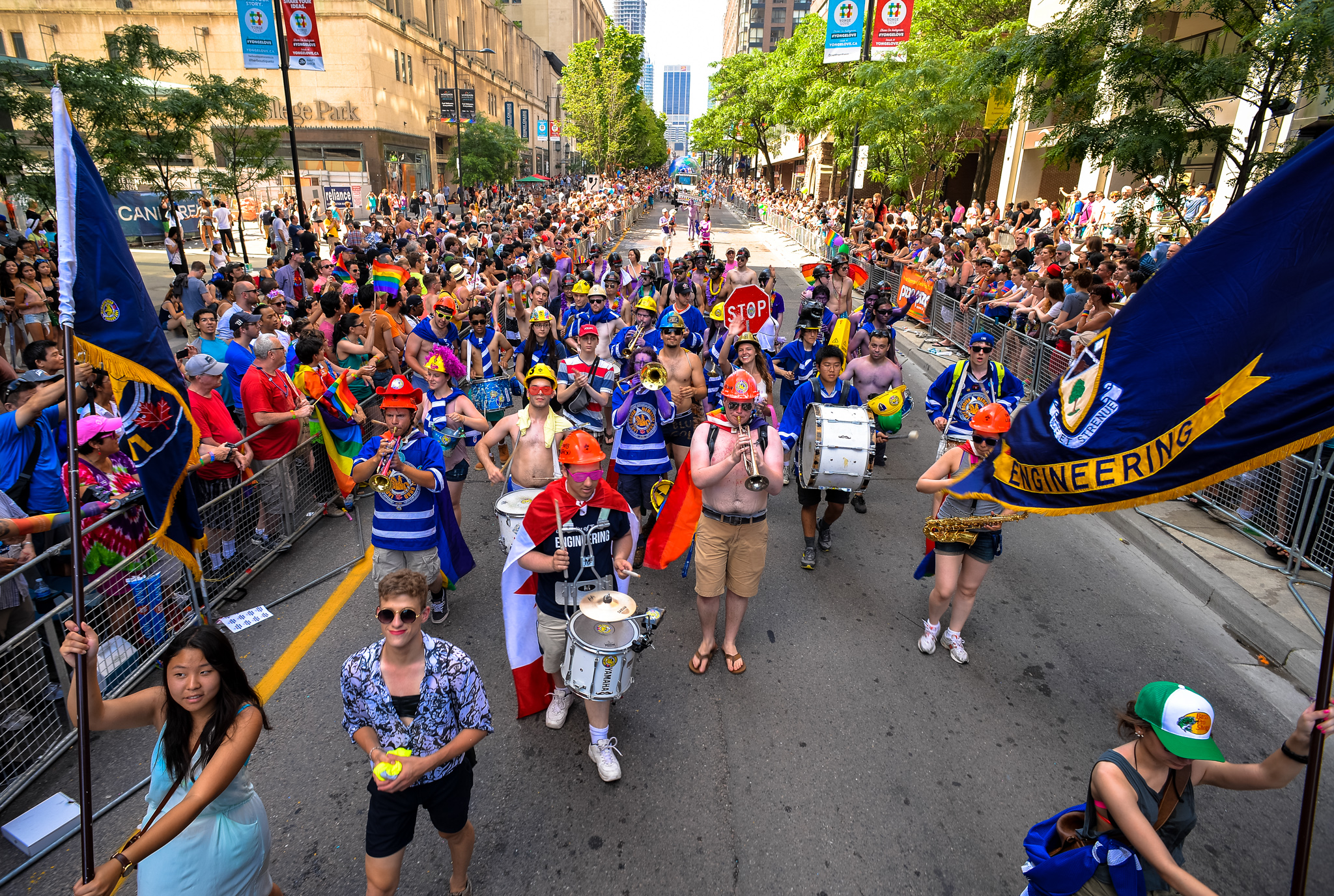
WorldPride in Toronto, Canada, 2014

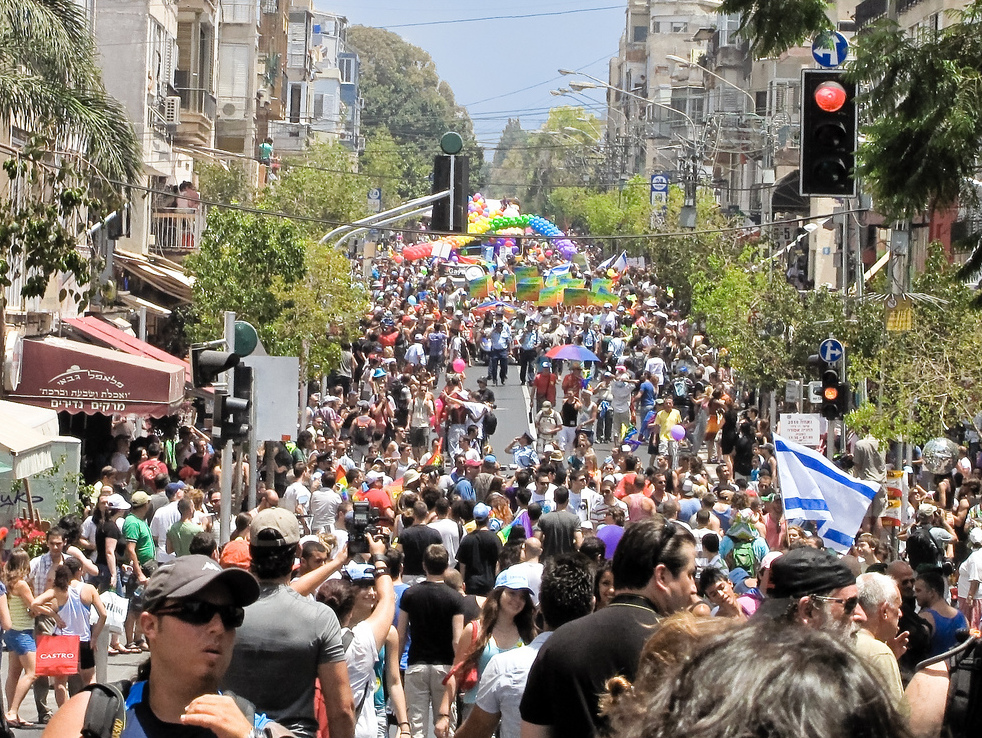
Tel Aviv Pride in Israel, 2010

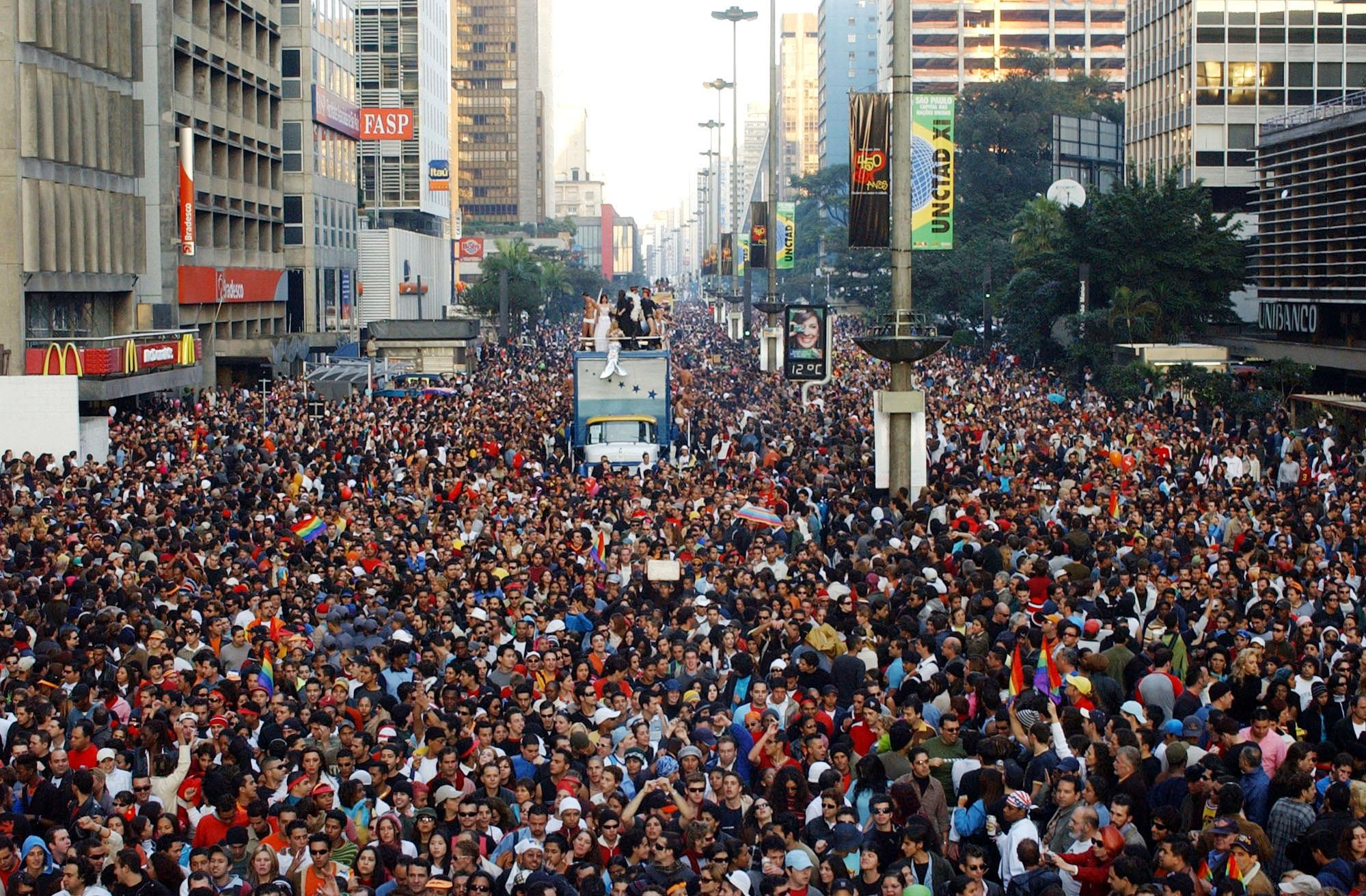
São Paulo Pride Parade in Brazil, 2004

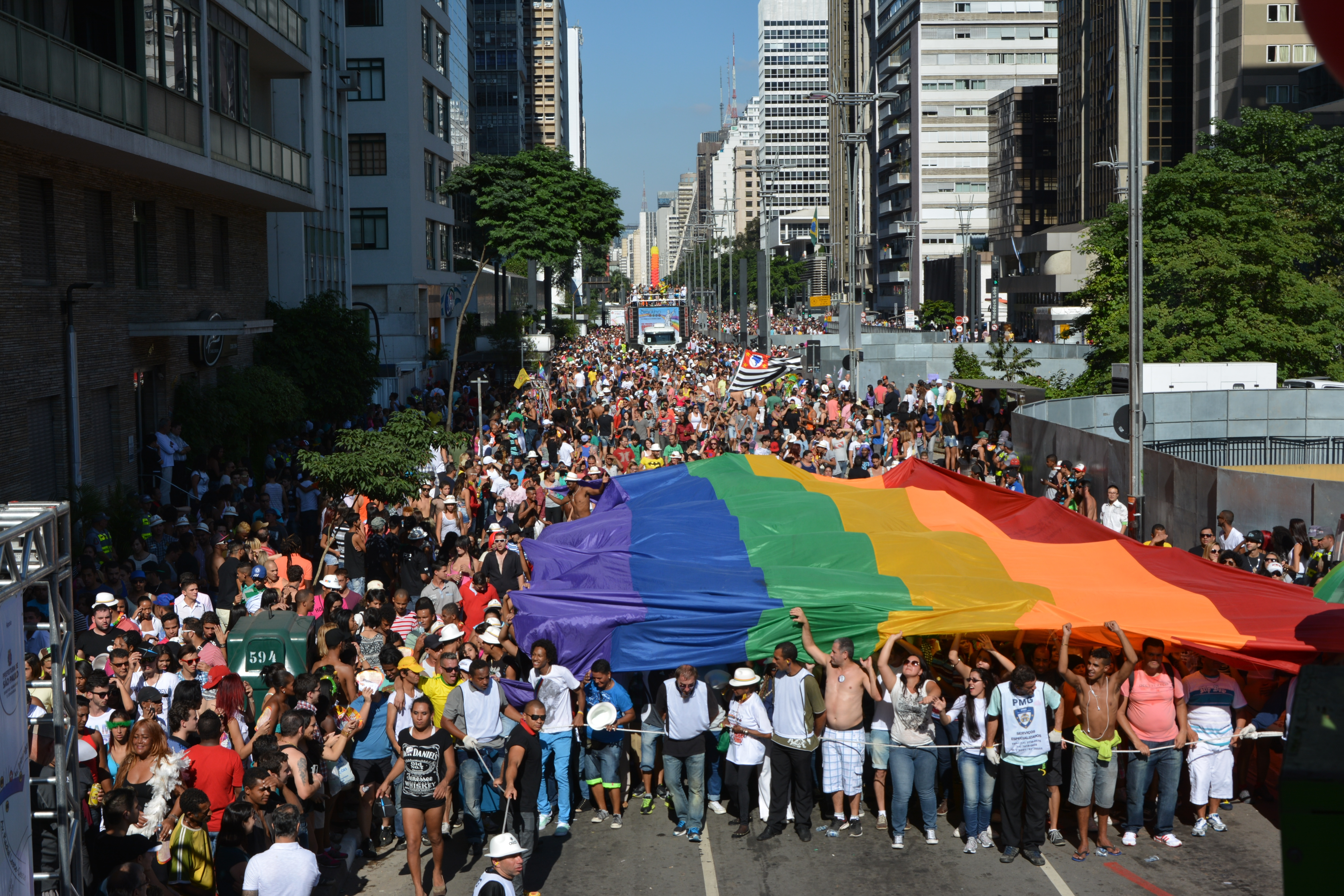
São Paulo Pride Parade in Brazil, 2014

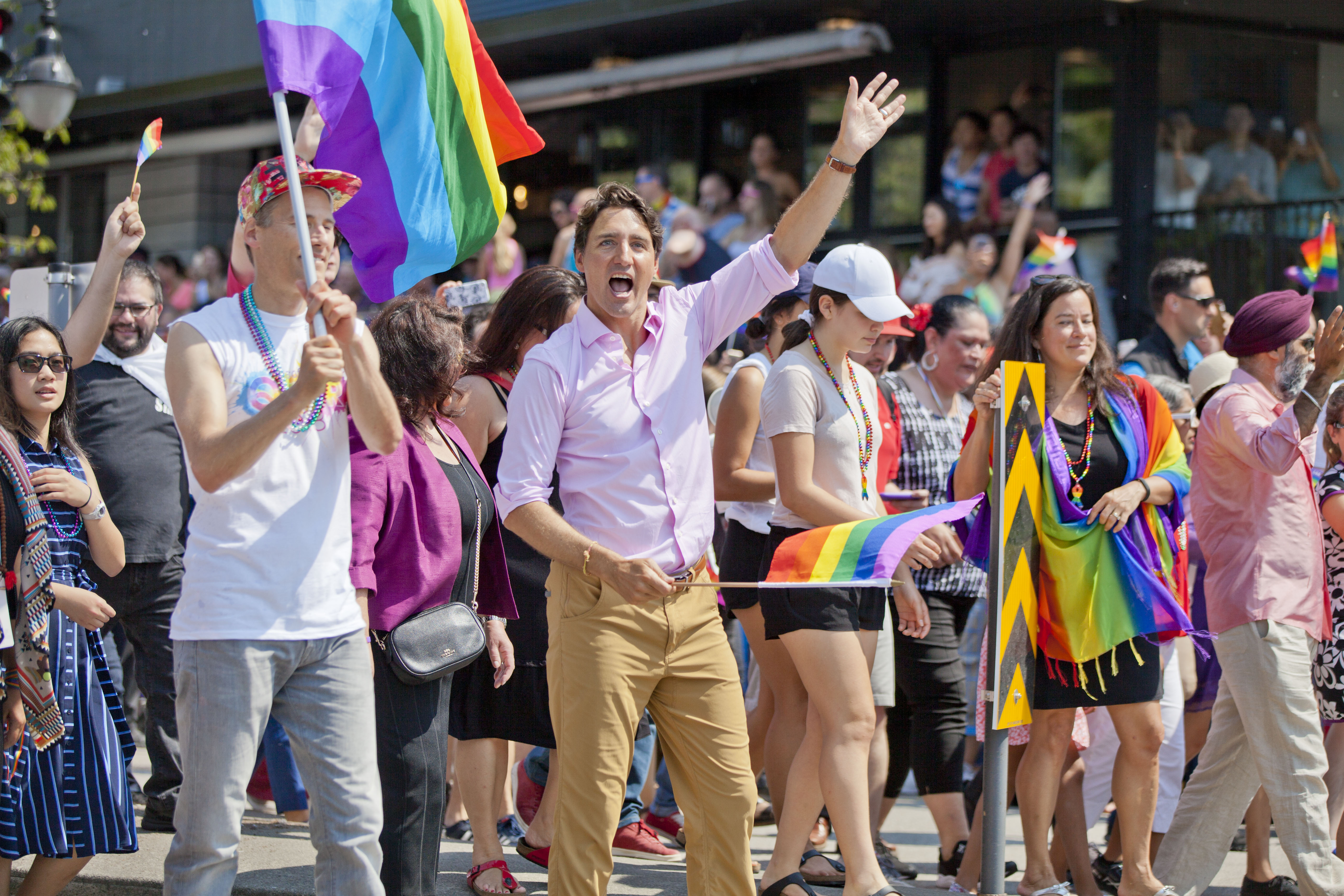
Canadian PM Justin Trudeau, at Vancouver Pride Parade, 2018

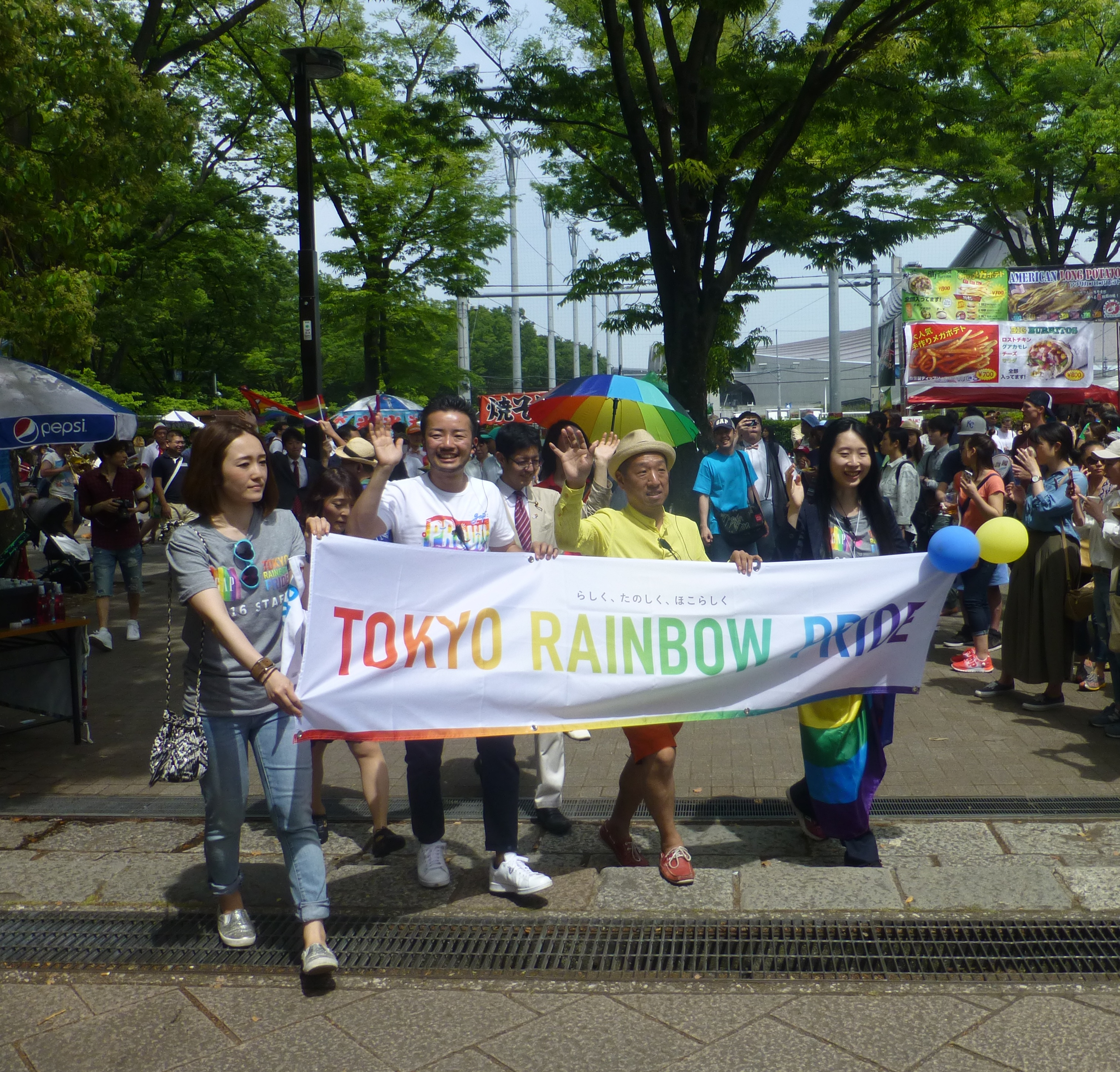
Tokyo Rainbow Pride in Japan, 2016

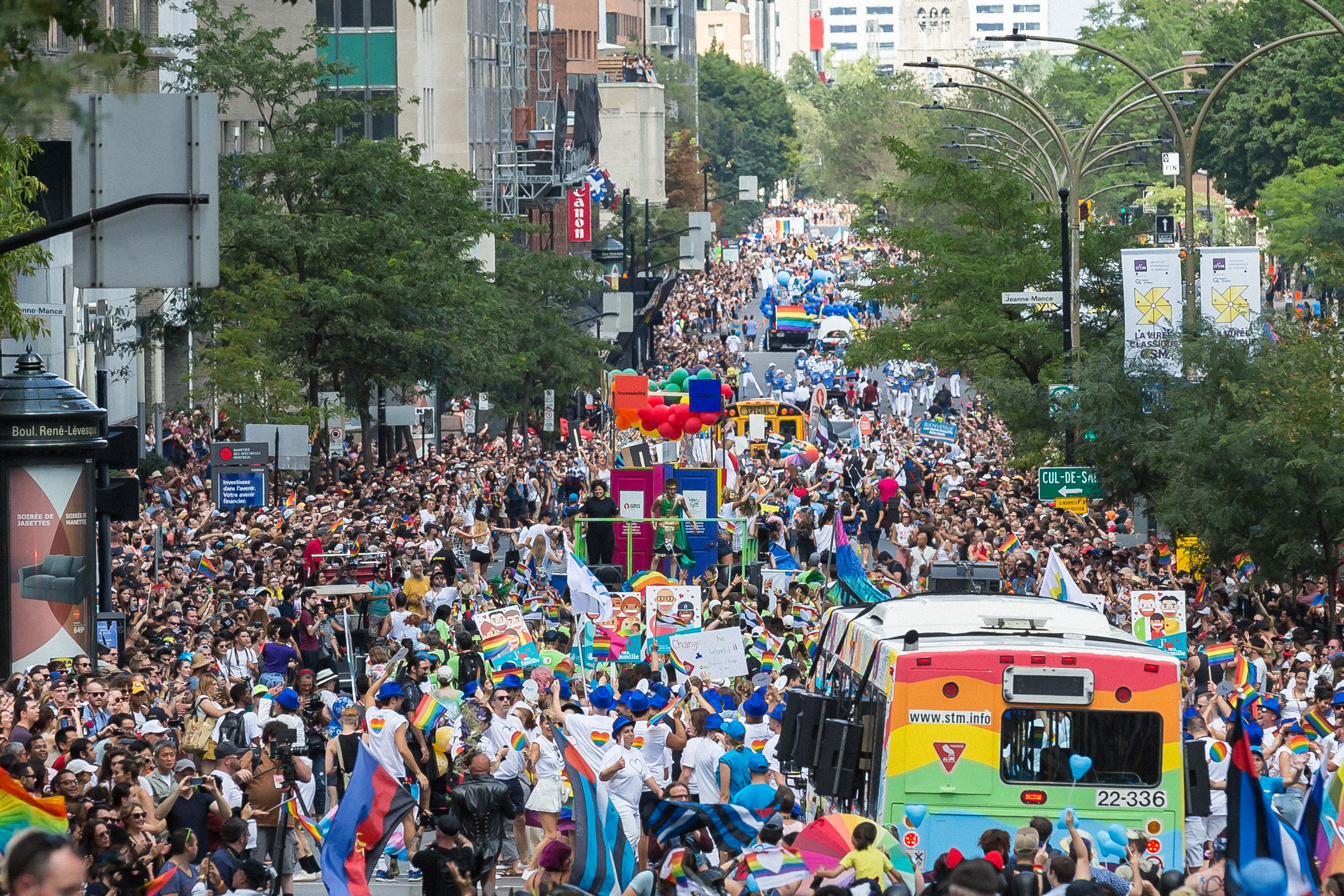
Montreal Pride Parade in Quebec, 2018

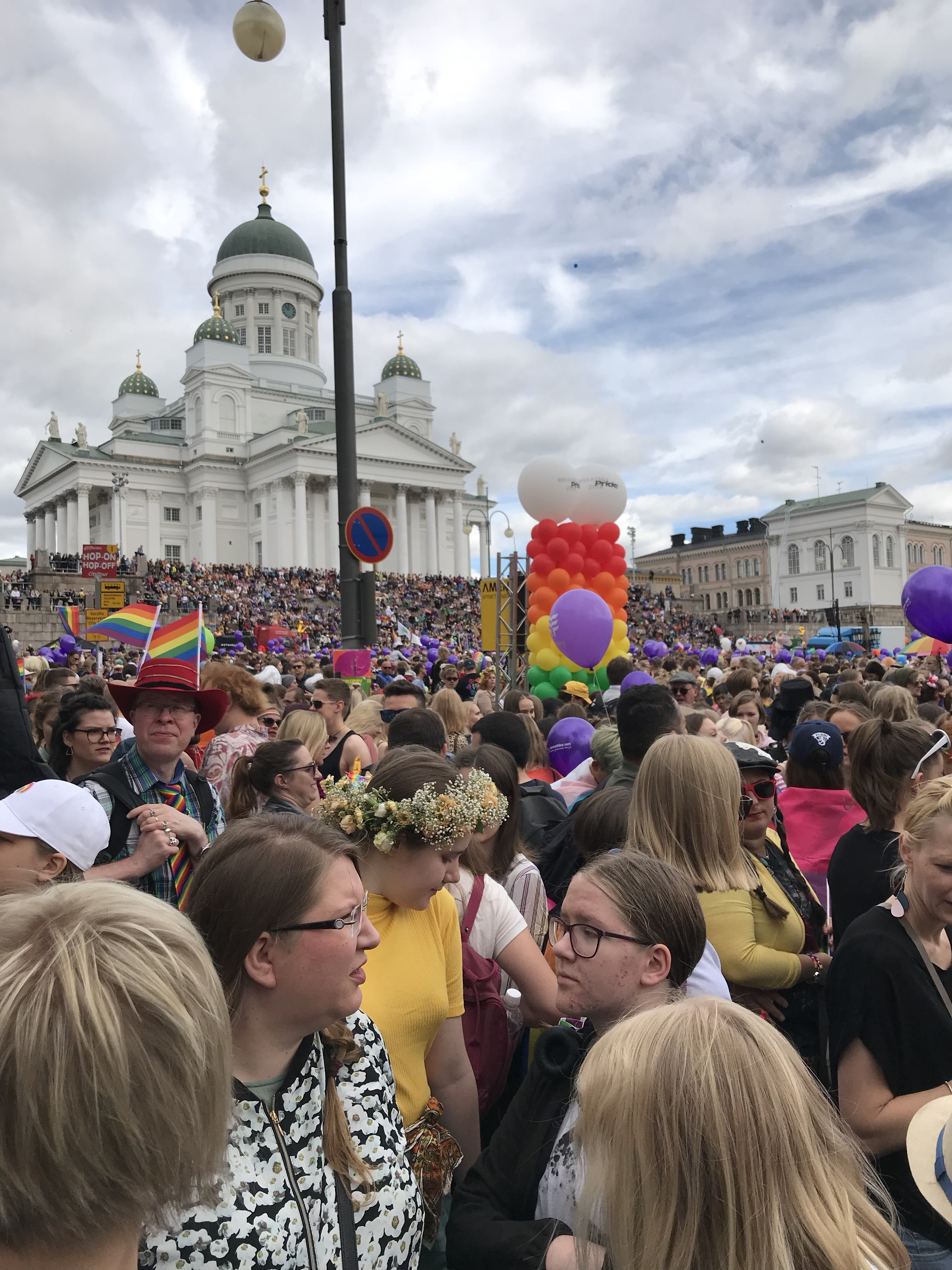
Helsinki Pride, Senate Square in Finland, 2019

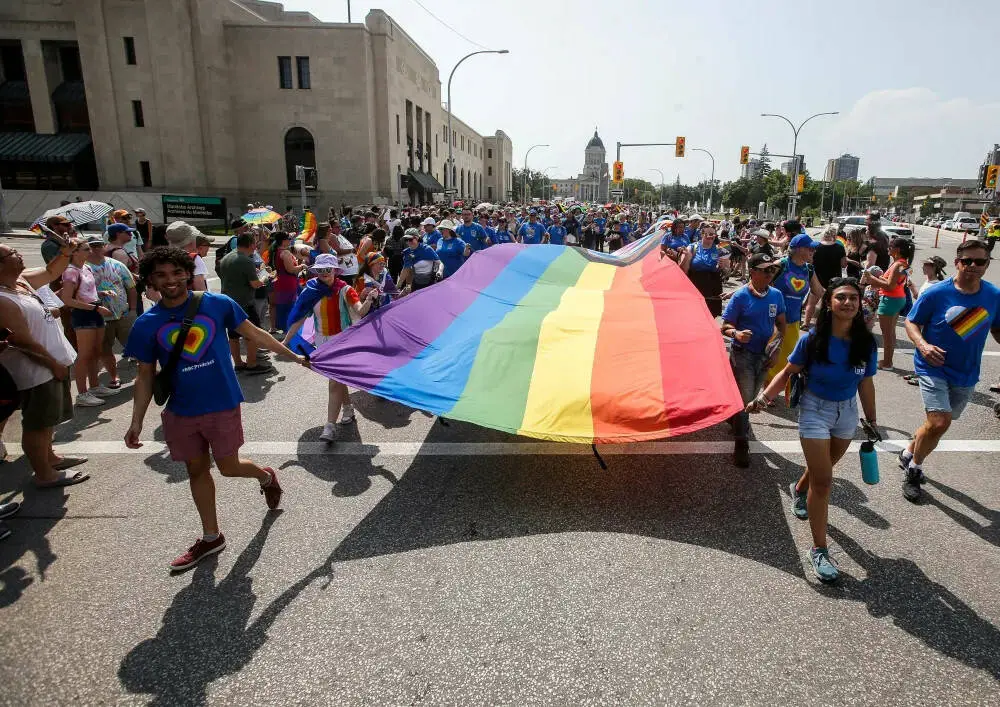
Winnipeg Pride Parade in Canada, June 4, 2023

== See also ==
- List of largest LGBT events
- List of LGBTQ awareness periods

=== Pride parades ===
- Gay pride
- Pride parade
- List of largest LGBTQ events
- List of LGBTQ awareness periods

=== Lists of articles about LGBTQ events ===
- All events
- All events by country
- Bear events
- Beauty pageants
- Circuit parties
- Film festivals
- Music events
- Pride parades
- Sport events
