= LGBTQ people in Canada =

Canadian pride flag

Although same-sex sexual activity was illegal in Canada up to 1969, gay and lesbian themes appear in Canadian literature throughout the 20th century. Canada is now regarded as one of the most advanced countries in legal recognition of lesbian, gay, bisexual, transgender and queer (LGBTQ) rights.

Canada is a relatively gay-friendly country, with its largest cities featuring their own gay areas and communities, such as Toronto's Church and Wellesley neighbourhood, Montreal's Gay Village commercial district, Vancouver's Davie Village, and Ottawa's Bank Street Gay Village. Social surveys show a general tolerance of homosexuality. Every summer, Canada's LGBTQ community celebrates pride in all major cities, with many political figures from the federal, provincial, and municipal governments. There are a number of LGBTQ-targeted media outlets. Attitudes to LGBTQ rights are under debate within and between different Christian churches.

== History ==
Same-sex sexual activity was decriminalised in Canada in 1969. Subsequently, discrimination on the basis of sexual orientation was outlawed in different parts of the country, and during the late 1990s, this was extended to the whole of Canada in a series of legal judgments. Same-sex marriage was recognised in 2005. Gender identity and gender expression were brought under the Canadian Human Rights Act in 2017.

== Rights ==
Since the Supreme Court of Canada's 1995 decision in Egan v Canada, sexual orientation has been considered a prohibited basis of discrimination under Section 15 of the Canadian Charter of Rights and Freedoms. Some provinces enacted protections against discrimination based on sexual orientation prior to the Egan decision, with the first being Quebec's amendments to its Charter of Human Rights and Freedoms in 1977. On June 20, 1996, the Canadian Human Rights Act (CHRA, French: Loi canadienne sur les droits de la personne) was amended to include sexual orientation as a protected ground. The CHRA guarantees the right to equality, equal opportunity, fair treatment, and an environment free from discrimination in employment and the provision of goods, services, facilities, or accommodation within federal jurisdiction.

== Society ==
=== Demographics ===
While LGBTQ people live in both large and small communities throughout Canada, the largest and most prominent LGBTQ communities are located in major metropolitan cities, such as Toronto, Montreal, Vancouver, and Ottawa. LGBTQ-oriented neighborhoods, or gay villages, such as Toronto's Church and Wellesley, Vancouver's Davie Village, and Montreal's Village gai have emerged as hubs of LGBTQ culture and tourism.

As the Census of Canada does not ask respondents to identify their sexual orientation, there is no exact overall count of how many Canadians identify as LGBT. A separate data program, the Canadian Community Health Survey, showed in 2015 that 1.7 percent of respondents identified as gay or lesbian, and 1.3 percent identified as bisexual. However, the Health Survey is not the same thing as the census, and it is not a universal survey of all Canadians but only a self-selected voluntary survey filled out by active users of specific health services. Because same-sex marriage has been legal in Canada since the passage of the Civil Marriage Act in 2005, census figures are published for same-sex couples. The Canada 2006 Census recorded approximately 7,500 same-sex marriages nationwide, while the Canada 2011 Census listed 21,000. However, the 2011 data only included couples living in major cities; some additional data on same-sex couples in smaller communities were withheld from publication after Statistics Canada determined that due to data tabulation errors, as many as 4,500 pairs of platonic roommates may have been incorrectly counted as additional same-sex couples. This error primarily seemed to affect smaller natural resource communities, such as development sites in the Alberta oil sands, where some people reported themselves as both married and living with a person of the same sex, but may in fact have been migrant workers, who weren't married to the same person with whom they were sharing accommodation on the census date.

=== Festivities ===
Pride parades have been held in various cities throughout Canada since the events of Pride Week 1973 and have also become larger in attendance, as legal and cultural attitudes towards LGBTQ citizens in Canada are relaxed. The largest current pride event, Pride Week in Toronto, was launched in 1981 following that year's Operation Soap by Toronto Metropolitan Police; the bathhouse raid and reaction by LGBTQ people is considered the Canadian equivalent of the 1969 Stonewall riots in New York City. Edmonton Pride also evolved from the protests against a 1981 bathhouse raid in Edmonton, Alberta, although that event did not add a parade until the early 1990s. Many other Canadian cities, both large and small, have since launched annual pride events, with the largest and most prominent festivities taking place in Toronto, Calgary (Calgary Pride), Ottawa (Capital Pride), Montreal (Fierté Montréal), Halifax (Halifax Pride), and Vancouver (Vancouver Pride).

Toronto acted as host city for the international WorldPride in 2014.

As of 2017, at least one annual pride event takes place in every Canadian province and territory. In recent years, particularly in the 2010s, successful pride events have been launched in many Canadian cities much smaller than the traditional gay meccas. In addition to the events noted above, festivals are currently held in Cranbrook, Kamloops, Kelowna, Nanaimo, New Westminster, Prince George, Victoria and Whistler in British Columbia; Fort McMurray, Grande Prairie, Jasper, Lethbridge, Medicine Hat and Red Deer in Alberta; Moose Jaw, Prince Albert, Regina (Queen City Pride), and Saskatoon (Saskatoon Pride) in Saskatchewan; Brandon, Flin Flon, Portage la Prairie, Steinbach, Thompson and Winnipeg (Pride Winnipeg) in Manitoba; Belleville, Brockville, Cornwall, Durham Region, Elliot Lake, Greater Sudbury (Sudbury Pride), Hamilton (Pride Hamilton), Kitchener-Waterloo-Cambridge (Tri-Pride), Guelph (Guelph Pride), Halton Region, Kenora, Kingston, London, Muskoka District, Niagara Region, North Bay, Peel Region, Peterborough, Richmond Hill, Sault Ste. Marie, Simcoe County (Simcoe Pride), Thunder Bay (Thunder Pride), Timmins and Windsor (Windsor Pride) in Ontario; Quebec City, Rimouski and Sherbrooke in Quebec; Charlotte County, Fredericton, Miramichi, Moncton and Saint John in New Brunswick; Charlottetown in Prince Edward Island; Antigonish, Cumberland County, Pictou County, Truro, Sydney and Yarmouth in Nova Scotia; Corner Brook and St. John's in Newfoundland and Labrador; Whitehorse in Yukon; Norman Wells and Yellowknife in the Northwest Territories and Iqaluit in Nunavut.

In some smaller cities, pride events do not feature the parade that is a traditional part of larger pride festivals; Waterloo Region's tri-Pride, for example, currently centres around an afternoon music festival in a city park. Most pride events are held in the summer, although the cities of Guelph, Ottawa and Whistler also have "Winter Pride" festivals based on programs of winter recreational activities such as skating, skiing and snowboarding.

Many of the organizing committees are members of Fierté Canada Pride, a national organization that fosters collaboration between and helps to promote pride events.

Several major cities also host annual LGBTQ film festivals, including the Inside Out Film and Video Festival in both Toronto and Ottawa, Fairy Tales Queer Film Festival in Calgary, Reel Pride in Winnipeg, Image+Nation in Montreal, the Queer North Film Festival in Sudbury, the Reelout Queer Film Festival in Kingston, Queer City Cinema in Regina and the Vancouver Queer Film Festival in Vancouver.

=== Indigenous ===
Various Canadian Indigenous Nations have had terms to describe sexual and gender variance, such as the Siksika(Blackfoot) term aakíí’skassi which described men who performed work typically associated with women. Within indigenous communities these differences were seen as occupying a unique third gender role, and were not seen as a difference in sexuality. Today these people are often identified as Two-Spirit, a term put forth by Indigenous queer activist Albert McLeod, to broadly represent these variances within the many North American First Nations. Having a unique term was important as Indigenous queer identity and concerns were distinct from those of non-indigenous LGBTQ+ people.

=== Religion ===
While the earliest advocacy for LGBTQ rights initially came from or was adopted by members of the left-wing milieu of Canadian politics, LGBTQ-affirmative religious organizations such as the Metropolitan Community Church played an early role in the advocacy for civil rights. MCC pastor Brent Hawkes, rector of the MCC of Toronto, became one of the earliest openly gay advocates for LGBTQ civil rights in the country, and performed the first same-sex marriage ceremony in the country, eventually participating in the successful legal struggle to have it recognized by Ontario.

The issue of LGBTQ-affirmative policies has also become a major topic of theological and political discussion in the United Church of Canada, which now ordains LGBT clergy and performs same-sex marriage ceremonies.

On the opposite end, theological conservatives, including those who operate the Roman Catholic Church in Canada and related organizations, officially object to LGBTQ rights such as same-sex marriage and refuse to perform or recognize them.

=== Education ===
Anti-discrimination policies apply strongly to state school institutions throughout Canada. Catholic educational institutions have tended to object to these laws and have entered into controversies with provincial governments over the prevention of gay-straight alliances being formed in Catholic schools.

=== Media ===
Canada has a significant number of LGBT-targeted media outlets.

Pink Triangle Press has published the newspapers Xtra! in Toronto, Xtra! West in Vancouver and Capital Xtra! in Ottawa. In 2015, the company announced that it was folding all three print titles, but would continue publication of the website, Daily Xtra, as a digital media title. The company also formerly published the Toronto-based magazines The Body Politic and fab.

Other past and present LGBT publications in Canada have included Esprit, Rites, Fugues, Wayves, abOUT, Outlooks, OutWords, Perceptions, GO Info, Plenitude and Siren, as well as a short-lived national edition of fab.

The television channel OUTtv, a general interest channel for LGBTQ audiences, broadcasts on digital cable. Two premium subscription channels, Playmen TV and Maleflixxx Television, air gay pornography.

The broadcast group Evanov Communications operated CIRR-FM, a radio station in Toronto which aired a mix of contemporary hit radio music and LGBTQ-oriented talk programming. The company was granted a license to operate a similar radio station, CHRF in Montreal, which was launched in 2015 but converted to an adult standards format within less than a year; the original CIRR, in turn, was shut down in fall 2023.

Nova Scotian comic book shop Cape & Cowl Comics & Collectibles is a transgender-owned shop specializing in LGBTQ items and pride items, including pride flags, self-published books, zines, toys, DVD and VHS tape videos and other items. Proprietor Jay Aaron Roy also features a safe space in the shop for marginalized, LGBTQ, disabled and at-risk youth.

=== Literature ===
Most contemporary analysis of LGBTQ literature in Canada begins with three poets, Émile Nelligan, Frank Oliver Call and Elsa Gidlow. Although neither Nelligan nor Call can be definitively determined to have been gay, due to the lack of a clear biographical record of their sexual or romantic relationships, both have been extensively analyzed for the presence of homoerotic themes in some of their writing, while Gidlow wrote what is believed to be the first volume of openly lesbian love poetry ever published by a North American writer.

Nelligan suffered a psychotic breakdown at the age of 19 in 1899 and was institutionalized for the remainder of his life, and nearly all of his work was published only after his confinement. While the cause of his mental illness has been extensively debated, in recent years a number of critics and biographers have postulated that Nelligan was gay and suffered from inner conflict between his sexuality and his religious upbringing. Nelligan's poetry includes several allusions to public sex in parks, a practice much more strongly associated with the history of homosexuality than that of heterosexuality; Montreal's Mount Royal Park, the apparent inspiration for much of his outdoor poetry, was indeed known as a gay cruising spot even in Nelligan's lifetime. Nelligan was also profoundly inspired by writers, such as Paul Verlaine, Arthur Rimbaud and Charles Baudelaire, who openly wrote about LGBT themes. Despite the sexual and romantic nature of Nelligan's writing, no records exist to confirm that he ever had a sexual or romantic relationship with anyone male or female; however, later biographers have published some evidence that he may have been the lover of poet Arthur de Bussières.

Analysis of gay subtext in Call's writing rests especially on his 1944 poetry collection Sonnets for Youth, which contains explicit homoerotic themes and is inspired by Greek mythology including the myth of Hyacinth, although his earlier collections In a Belgian Garden and Acanthus and Wild Grape also contain numerous references to male beauty. In addition, all of Call's most explicitly sexual poetry is written in the second person, a common technique of gay writers who wish to disguise the gender of the person they're writing about. However, limited biographical information is known about Call outside of his writing itself, so his sexuality cannot be confirmed.

Despite the uncertainty surrounding their sexual orientations, both Nelligan and Call are included in John Barton and Billeh Nickerson's 2007 anthology Seminal: The Anthology of Canada's Gay Male Poets.

Gidlow and her friend Roswell George Mills also published Les Mouches fantastiques, the first known LGBT publication in Canadian history, between 1918 and 1920.

In 1943, critic John Sutherland published a review of Patrick Anderson's poetry in the literary magazine First Statement which suggested homoerotic themes in his writing, and accusing Anderson of "some sexual experience of a kind not normal"; Anderson was married at the time to Peggy Doernbach, and threatened to sue. Sutherland printed a retraction in the following issue. Anderson did in fact come out as gay later in life after returning to the United Kingdom in the 1950s, although he continued to treat his sexuality as a private matter, declining inclusion in an anthology of gay male literature in 1972. Sutherland later published a similar attack on Robert Finch, dismissing his poetry as the work of a "dandified versifier".

Explicitly gay male literature by openly gay writers emerged in Canada in the 1960s, with Paul Chamberland's poetry collection L'afficheur hurle (1964), Jean-Paul Pinsonneault's novel Les terres sèches (1964), Edward A. Lacey's poetry collection The Forms of Life (1965), Scott Symons' novel Place d'Armes (1967) and John Herbert's play Fortune and Men's Eyes (1967) each an important landmark in the history of Canadian LGBT literature.

Several contemporary openly gay writers of the late 20th and early 21st centuries, including Timothy Findley, Michel Tremblay, Tomson Highway, Marie-Claire Blais, Douglas Coupland, Wayson Choy and Ann-Marie MacDonald, have been among Canada's leading mainstream literary stars.

Beginning in 2007, the Writers' Union of Canada instituted the Dayne Ogilvie Prize, an annual literary award presented to emerging LGBTQ-identified writers. In 2018, Montreal's Blue Metropolis literary festival created the Blue Metropolis Violet Prize as a complement to honour established LGBTQ writers for their bodies of work.

Author Rachel Reid's works gained global attention in 2025 with the release of the Canadian television series Heated Rivalry.
