= Fierté Canada Pride =

Canadian LGBTQ+ organization

- Abbreviation: FCP
- Formation: 2004
- Type: National Member Association
- Legal status: Federal Not For Profit
- Region served: Canada
- Executive Director: Alessandro Iachelli (he/him)
- President: Julie DeMarchi (she/her)
- Affiliations: InterPride
- Website: Fierté Canada Pride

Fierté Canada Pride is a Canadian organization which represents and is composed of organisers of local LGBT pride festivals in Canada, as well as serving as the Canadian chapter (Region 7) of InterPride. Many, but not all, pride festivals in Canada are members of the organization.

== Organization structure ==
Fierté Canada Pride is a registered federal not-for-profit organization that is led by a board of directors and an executive director. The board is composed of a president, vice president of governance, a vice president of membership, a vice president of human resources, a secretary, a treasurer, a communications director, and directors at large in various parts of Canada. FCP has created four Leadership Councils representing Two Spirit, Women, People of Colour, trans, non-binary and gender-diverse individuals.

== History ==
At its annual general meeting (AGM) in 2015, the organization formally launched Canada Pride/Fierté Canada, a program modelled on WorldPride which will see a different Canadian city host a national Canada Pride festival every two years. The first Canada Pride was held in Montreal, Quebec in 2017, in conjunction with the city's regular Fierté Montréal.

At the 2017 AGM, Pride Winnipeg was selected to host the second edition of Canada Pride/Fierté Canada which was to take place May 22–31, 2020. It was later delayed to 2022 due to the COVID pandemic. At the AGM, delegates also voted in favour of Calgary Pride hosting the 2018 conference and general meeting.

=== List of Fierté Canada Prides and National Conferences/AGMs ===
| Edition | Year | Location | Dates | Host Organization | Notable details |
|---|---|---|---|---|---|
| I | 2017 | Montreal, Quebec | August 10–20 | Fierté Montréal | Featured as part of the official programming of Montreal's 375th and Canada 150 celebrations. Montreal Mayor Denis Coderre offered an official apology to the LGBTQ+ community for violence and discrimination perpetrated against the community by local police forces in the 1960s to 1990s. Canadian Prime Minister Justin Trudeau marched with Irish Taoiseach Leo Varadkar (the first openly gay Irish leader) and Vradkar's partner Matthew Barrett. This edition of the pride parade was the largest in the city's history. |
| II | 2022 | Winnipeg, Manitoba | June 1–5 | Pride Winnipeg | Postponed from 2020 to 2022 due to COVID-19 pandemic in Canada |
| III | 2024 | Vancouver, British Columbia | July 26-Aug 4 | Vancouver Pride Society | Theme: "Infinite Horizons" |
| IV | 2027 | Halifax, Nova Scotia | July 5-15 | Halifax Pride | |

==== National Conferences and AGMs ====
| Year | Location | Dates | Host Organization | Notable events |
|---|---|---|---|---|
| 2008 | Vancouver, British Columbia | | Vancouver Pride Society | |
| 2009 | Montreal, Quebec | | Fierté Montréal | |
| 2010 | Toronto, Ontario | March | Pride Toronto | |
| 2011 | Halifax, Nova Scotia | | Halifax Pride | |
| 2012 | Kelowna, British Columbia | March | Kelowna Pride | |
| 2013 | Ottawa, Ontario | | Capital Pride | |
| 2014 | Winnipeg, Manitoba | | Pride Winnipeg | |
| 2015 | Saskatoon, Saskatchewan | | Saskatoon Pride | Canada Pride/Fierté Canada formally launched |
| 2016 | London, Ontario | February 18–21 | Pride London Festival | |
| 2017 | Halifax, Nova Scotia | February 16–19 | Halifax Pride | Winnipeg chosen as 2020 host city |
| 2018 | Calgary, Alberta | February 7–11 | Calgary Pride | |
| 2019 | Ottawa, Ontario | February 7–10 | Capital Pride | |
| 2020 | Regina, Saskatchewan | February 6–9 | Regina Pride Inc. Queen City Pride | |
| 2021 | Online | March 27–28 | Thunder Pride Association | Held online due to COVID Pandemic |
| 2022 | Online | March 25–27 | Jointly with The Enchanté Network | Held online due to COVID Pandemic |
| 2023 | Kelowna, British Columbia | March 9–12 | Kelowna Pride Society | |
| 2024 | Charlottetown, Prince Edward Island | March 7–10 | Pride PEI | |
| 2025 | Calgary, Alberta | March 6–9 | Calgary Pride | |
| 2026 | Calgary, Alberta | March 18-22 | Calgary Pride | |
