= Dish! =

- Genre: talk show
- Country of origin: Canada
- Original language: English
- No. of seasons: 1
- No. of episodes: 3

Production
- Executive producer: David Walberg
- Producer: Frank Prendergast
- Running time: 30 minutes

Original release
- Network: OUTtv
- Release: February 9, 2009

Dish! is a Canadian English language talk show. Dish! premiered on February 9, 2009 at 10:30 p.m. EST on the Canadian specialty channel, OUT TV.

== Premise ==
Dish! is described as a multi-platform talk series featured in print, on the Internet and television. Dish! is a three-part talk series where prominent members of the LGBT community are interviewed by one of their peers.

== Season 1 ==
=== Episode 1 ===
The first episode features actor and comedian Scott Thompson being interviewed by fellow comedian Elvira Kurt. The episode premiered on OUTtv, Xtra.ca and a portion of the transcript interview was featured in the Pink Triangle Press owned magazines Xtra!, Xtra! West and Capital Xtra!.

=== Episode 2 ===
The second episode features novelist Colm Toibin interviewed by Emma Donoghue. The episode was shown on OUTtv, Xtra.ca and portions of the transcript interview were featured in Xtra!, Xtra! West and Capital Xtra!.

=== Episode 3 ===
The third episode features filmmaker Terence Davies interviewed by Noah Cowan. The interview was featured exclusively on Xtra.ca.
