= Carol Philipps =

Canadian journalist and activist

Carol Anne Philipps (February 5, 1965 – February 27, 2009) was a Canadian journalist and activist, most prominent as the original editor of Swerve, the first lesbian, gay, bisexual and transgender community magazine in Winnipeg.

Philipps first came out in high school, at a time when Winnipeg did not yet have a gay and lesbian community centre or a Pride parade, and eventually moved in with her first partner, Noreen Stevens. Although Philipps and Stevens eventually ended their relationship, they remained close friends and collaborators. She studied at the University of Winnipeg and joined the university's student newspaper, The Uniter, where she helped to coordinate a controversial LGBT issue in 1991. She later moved to Vancouver, where she campaigned for Betty Baxter, an openly lesbian New Democratic Party candidate in Vancouver Centre in the 1993 federal election, and returned to Winnipeg in 1994.

The LGBT community in Winnipeg was facing tough battles when Philipps returned to the city. Mayor Susan Thompson had refused a request to proclaim the city's Pride Day, the Winnipeg School Division had voted against an anti-homophobia curriculum and a man had recently been murdered in an anti-gay hate crime. Against this backdrop, a small group of community activists, including Philipps, met to discuss launching what would become Swerve, and Philipps became the magazine's first editor.

While editing Swerve, she met her partner Virginia McKee in 1995. Philipps and McKee married in 2007.

She stepped down as editor of Swerve in 1997 for health reasons, but continued to contribute to the magazine, as well as to publications such as Xtra! in Toronto, as an occasional freelance writer. She also worked at Viewpoints Research.

According to Stephen Lawson, another member of Swerve's editorial board,

She demanded a level of reporting that went beyond what was going on at the drag bar or what the bears were doing. It was very sad when the paper declined. But it had to. It didn't have Carol Philipps at the helm.

She died on February 27, 2009, due to a congenital heart condition.
