= Simcoe Pride =

Annual LGBT event in Ontario, Canada

Fierté Simcoe Pride
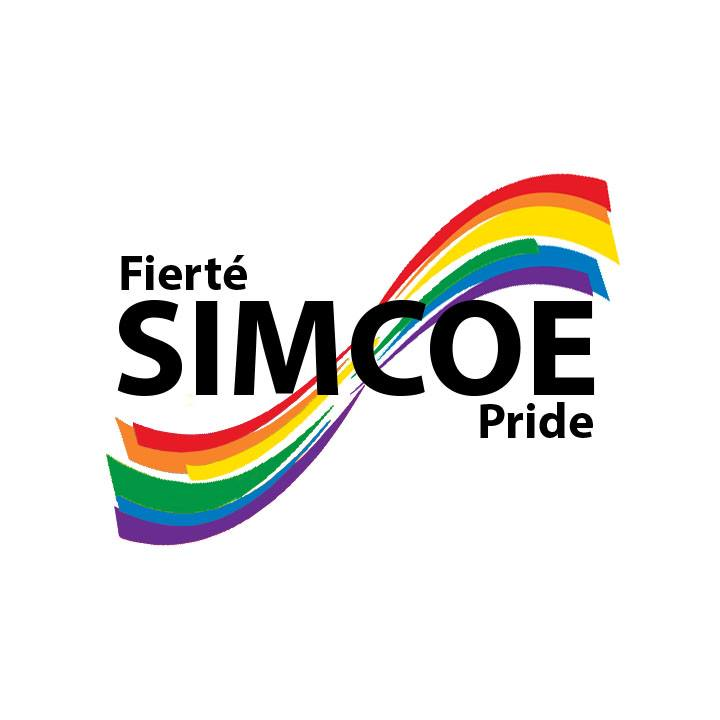
- Organization logo
- Formation: 2012
- Type: Festival organization based in Simcoe County, Ontario, Canada
- Legal status: Not-for-profit corporation (active)
- Headquarters: Tay, Ontario
- Region served: Simcoe County
- President: Christian Kenehan
- Website: www.fiertesimcoepride.com

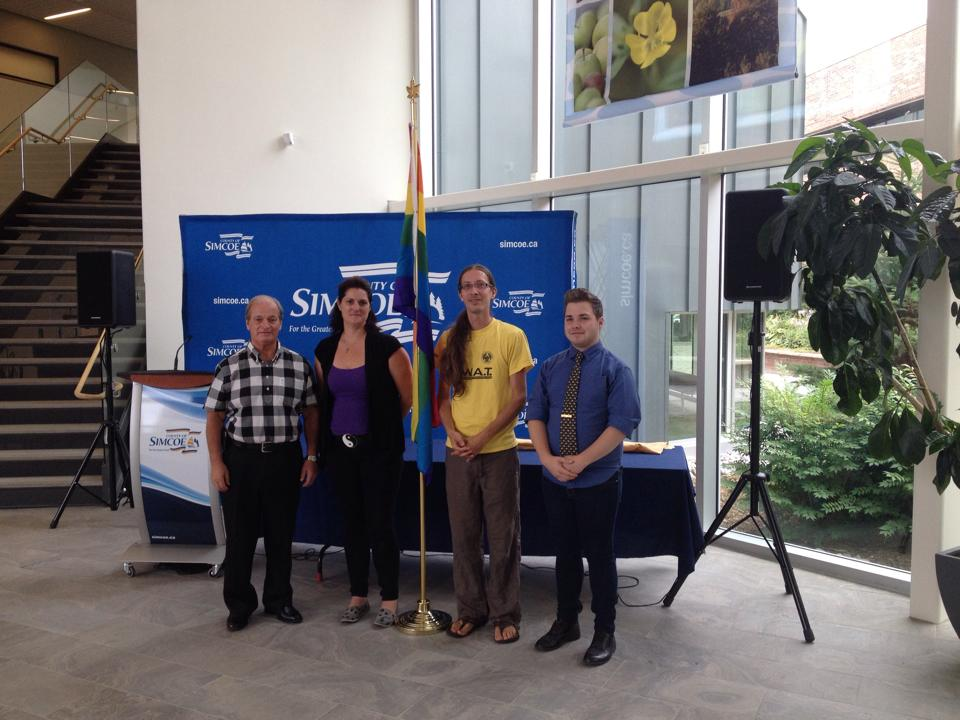
Simcoe County unveils the pride flag for the first time during the 2014 Simcoe Pride, joining a large number of other lower-tier municipalities in the county.

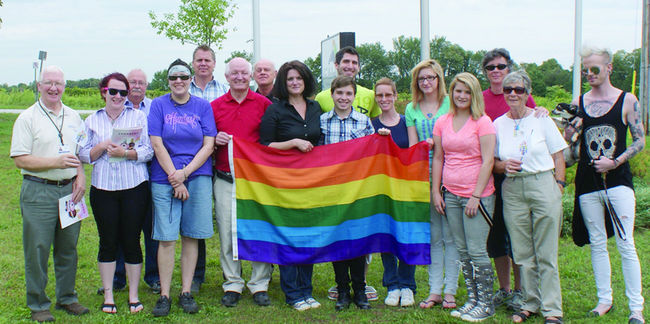
Oro-Medonte Township was one of several Simcoe County communities that raised a flag for pride week 2013.

Fierté Simcoe Pride is an annual festival held in Simcoe County, Ontario, during the end of July and beginning of August each year. It is a celebration of the diversity of the LGBT community in Simcoe County. It is one of the larger regional gay pride festivals in Canada, featuring flag raisings and proclamations from across the county, educational events, artistic and cultural events, and a large closing event. Since forming, the organisation has expanded gradually, involving more year-round events. In 2016, the organisation celebrated its fifth anniversary Pride.

== Leadership and organization ==
Fierté Simcoe Pride is managed by Christian Kenehan and a volunteer Board of Directors, who handle the finances, logistics and operations of the organisation and events. Volunteers are involved in running the events.

The events are funded through donations, sponsorships, in-kind support, and fundraisers.

=== Previous presidents ===
- Mary Sue Robinet
- Brandon Amyot
- Keegan Hobson (Interim)
- Christian Kenehan

== LGBT history in Simcoe County ==
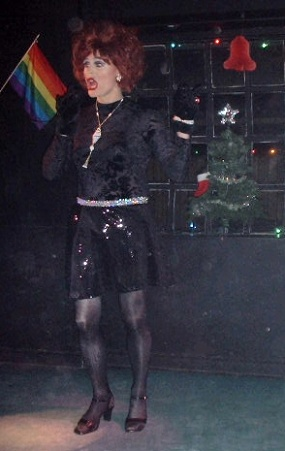
Drag queen "Madame Outrageous", founder and president of the Craig Russell Fan Club, at Dusty's Den in the early 2000s

Organizing for the LGBT community in Simcoe County has been traced back to the mid-1980s/early 1990s with faith-based communities, various community-based committees, social groups and school-based supports.

These community based supports either relied on fundraising from a small pool of supporters, were offered for a fee or were sponsored through an organization. With a lack of sustainability, many of these supports no longer exist or have evolved into different resources like those offered by Rainbow Health Ontario and programming provided by the AIDS Committee of Simcoe County.

=== Early celebrations and community ===
In 1984, the Gays and Lesbians Alliance of Simcoe County (GLAS) was formed and ran until 2001. They held a cruise on the Serendipity Princess from 1996 to 2000.

The Simcoe County Metropolitan Community Church (SCMCC), led by Reverend Carol Galbraith and founded around 1993, advocated for the LGBT community as well as the legalization of same-sex marriage in Canada. It also provided support to the community and each year held a banquet and awards ceremony to honour people and organizations who supported and advocated for the lesbian, gay, bisexual and transgender community the region. The congregation met at Grove Street United Church and existed until the mid to late 2000s.

=== H.O.P.E. Theatre Troupe and youth ===
The Holding On through Peer Education (H.O.P.E.) Theatre Troupe (through the ACSC, now the Gilbert Centre) secured funding in the late 1990s. Although not an LGBT specific program, LGBT youth found it to be a safe space. In the early 2000s the program was no longer sustainable due to lack of funding. The LGBT Youth Drop-In, a sponsored program of the AIDS Committee of Simcoe County had success in the early 2000s although the program depended on community fundraisers and in-kind donations. Eventually this program could no longer sustain itself.

In 2011 two Ryerson University students identified a need to support LGBT youth in Simcoe County. They started the LGBT Youth Connection with their own resources and support of other organizations. The program is still running, and has expanded from Barrie into other parts of the county.

=== Opening Closets ===
In 2003, Huronia Transition Homes formed the Diversity Committee and ran the Opening Closets conference, which took place every other year. They eventually renamed themselves the Opening Closets Conference Committee. The conference was an opportunity to inform and train a variety of workers on sexual diversity and LGBT issues. In 2009 the Opening Closets conference had a particular focus on LGBT youth. This committee has been non-active since 2010.

=== Formalizing Pride and community work ===
In May 2002, Mary Sue Robinet formed PFLAG in Barrie. It began running meetings to support for families, allies and people who are LGBT. The group struggled for several years with various leaders, until October 2008 when Robinet took it over. The group had been inactive from 2011 to approximately 2017, when it was revived again as PFLAG Barrie-Simcoe County. The group now runs several support groups throughout the county as well as a choir, known as The Quoir.

From 2003 to 2005, a pride week was run by the Simcoe County Pride Committee with the main events taking place in Barrie, Ontario, as well as support from Midland, Ontario, Penetanguishene, Bradford West Gwillimbury and Orillia.

In 2008, LGBTA Barrie formed (formalizing in 2009), holding fundraisers and bar events at Memories. They also did a flag raising in 2008 to honour International Day Against Homophobia, Biphobia and Transphobia and ran a pride week in August 2008 and 2009.

Once Simcoe Pride formed, Mary Sue Robinet and the board decided to hold Simcoe Pride Week in or around the month of August (as opposed to during June, the popular month to hold Pride events) to honour the past pride events that existed in the county.

=== School-based support ===
The Georgian LGBTQA Association of Georgian College formed in 2009, holding a flag raising at the Barrie Campus. It has since rebranded twice, now operating under the name of Georgian Pride. In March of that year they held a World Café in partnership with Rainbow Health Ontario (RHO). After this conference, several organizations and events formed, such as Muskoka Pride (first as a picnic, then a committee in 2010), the Simcoe County LGBTQ Network, and the Safety and Equity Conference.

In 2010 the Ontario Secondary School Teachers' Federation District 17 Human Rights Committee organized their first conference for students who participated in their Gay-Straight Alliances (GSAs). The conferences was organized in 2010 and 2011 to support students through educational and leadership development.

=== 2009 to present day ===
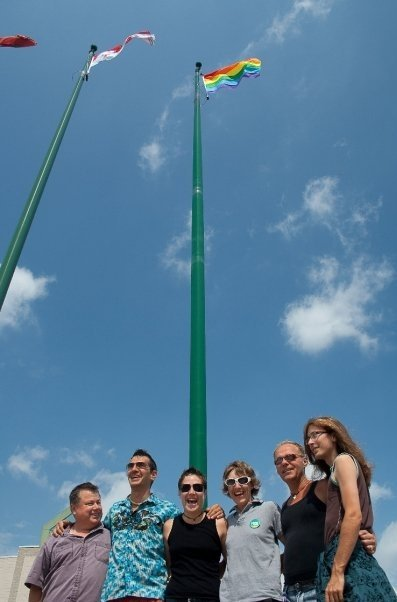
Some of the many pioneers of LGBT work in Simcoe County in Barrie, August 2009. Left to right: Matt Commandant, Jason Jones, Mary Sue Robinet, Alyssa Nesbitt, Rob Fortner, and Andrew Baker.

A pride week and flag raising were held in Barrie in 2010 from August 23 to 27 by LGBTA Barrie, with events and a boat cruise organized by Mary Sue Robinet and community members.

In 2014, Barrie Pride formed, holding a successful first pride week and first pride parade in the second week of June. Barrie Pride was again held in June 2015, 2016, and 2017.

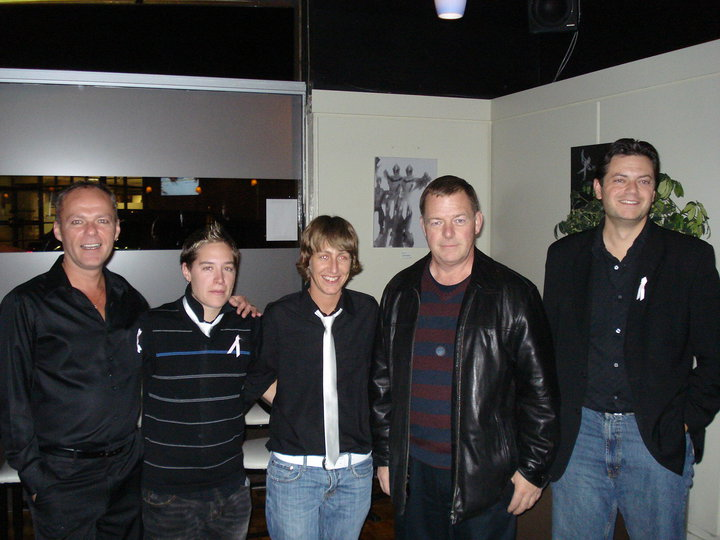
LGBTA Fundraiser in 2009 for the Canadian Cancer Society with Mayor Dave Aspden and Councillor Jeff Lehman

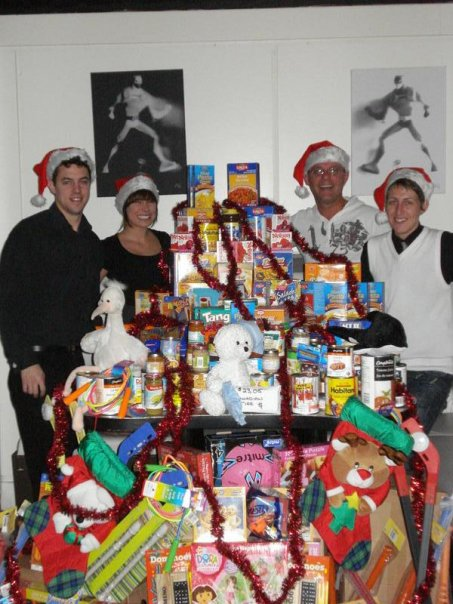
LGBTA Fundraiser in December 2009 for Christmas Cheer Barrie

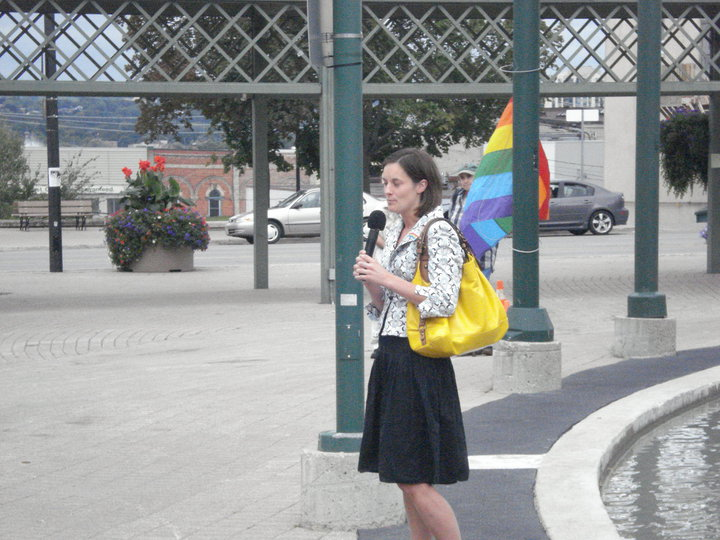
Lynn Strachan, Barrie City Councillor (2003–2014), at the pride flag raising in 2010

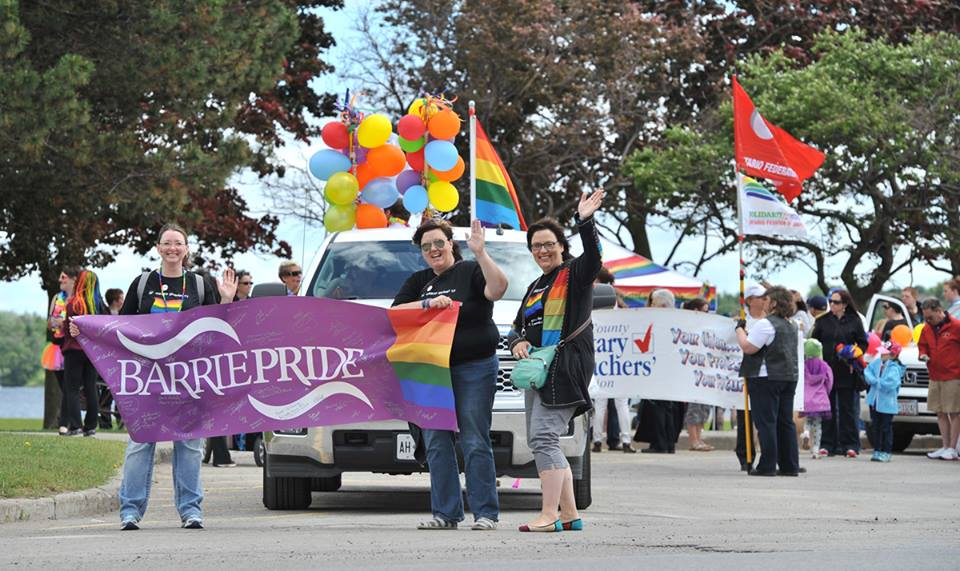
Organizers of Barrie Pride's pride parade in 2014 march at the front of the crowd

== Fierté Simcoe Pride: 2012 to present ==
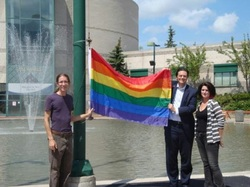
The inaugural flag raising of Simcoe Pride in Barrie. L to R: J. Andrew Baker, Mayor Jeff Lehman, and Mary Sue Robinet. Robinet founded Simcoe Pride.

Simcoe Pride was founded on May 13, 2012, by Mary Sue Robinet. with a small committee of volunteers. Much like past pride groups, the committee started off will small fundraisers run by Robinet. Dances, drag shows and brunches. However, the founders made it clear that it would be a "lasting force" in the community.

=== Inaugural Pride Week ===
The inaugural Simcoe Pride Week run by Mary Sue Robinet, which was planned in under three months, was held in 2012 from August 3 to 11. With the exception of one event, the dusk till dawn movie night in Oro-Medonte, this pride week was all hosted in Barrie. No boat cruise was held that year, due to limited resources. However, Robinet organized a flag raising, spiritual service/blessing, candlelight vigil and march, a community art show and silent auction, and ended the week with a family fun fair and pride prom.

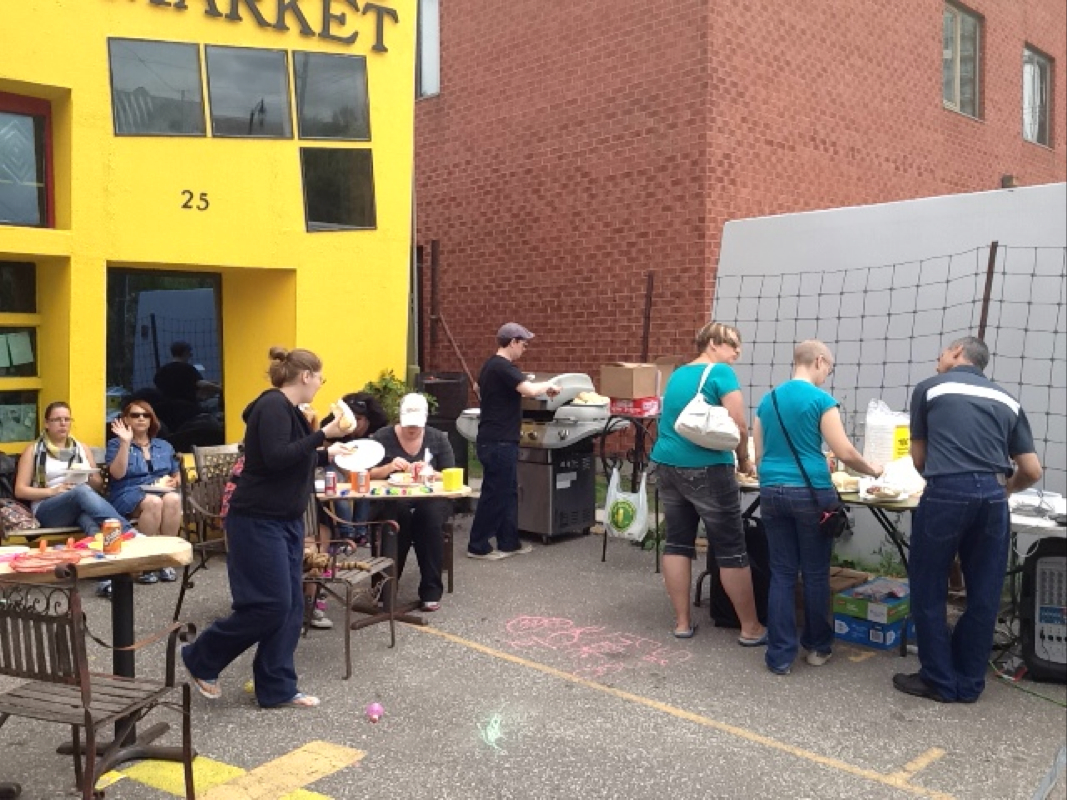
People at the Family Fun Fair/BBQ

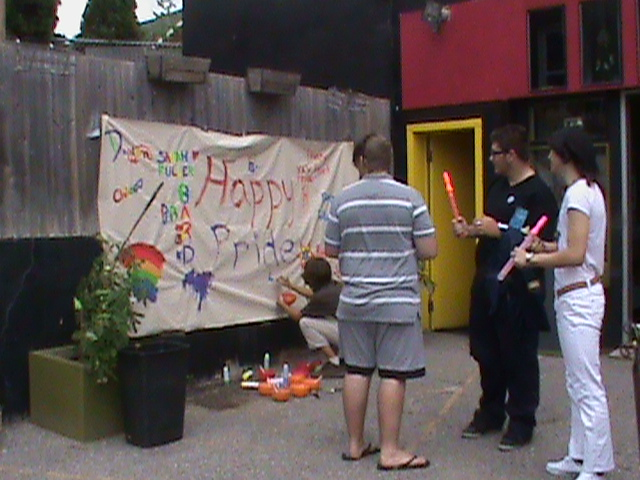
Families paint on the Pride banner, which became an annual tradition.

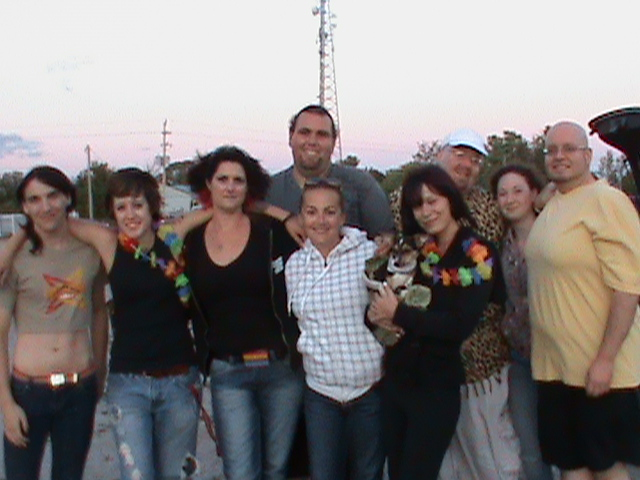
Some community members at the dusk till dawn movie night

=== Growth of support ===
Following the inaugural festival, Simcoe Pride, led by Mary Sue Robinet, began planning for pride week 2013, which took place from August 2 to 10. Simcoe Pride Week 2013 was larger than the year before, with eight days of events spread over nine days. In addition to hosting the first annual boat cruise, that did not happen the year before, the pride week (and its flag raisings) expanded from Barrie to other communities in the county, including Ramara, Oro-Medonte, New Tecumseth, Orillia, Innisfil, Bradford West Gwillimbury, Midland and Penetanguishene. Other events included Saturday a family fun fair, dusk till dawn movie night, candlelight vigil, 'Make It Safe' march, community art show and silent auction, and all-ages semi-formal and close-off party.

The march, Robinet named 'Make It Safe', was held in response to an act of violence against a community member who was targeted and assaulted. Though violence and discrimination toward LGBT people is not unheard of, many victims are afraid to speak out. Although the march was planned earlier, Robinet changed the name to reflect the violent attack as well as to raise awareness about other issues LGBT individuals face.

The following year, Robinet made Simcoe Pride Week from July 31 to August 9, 2014. This pride week was a considerably large festival in comparison to the past prides, this is because the week had support from the county and the largest number of municipalities yet, with flag raisings at the County of Simcoe, and in Barrie, Orillia, Bradford West Gwillimbury, Ramara, Innisfil, Wasaga Beach, Chippewas of Rama First Nation, New Tecumseth, Midland, Penetanguishene, Clearview, and Oro Medonte. With the exception of Clearview, all also proclaimed pride along with Severn and Adjala–Tosorontio. Collingwood, which has a policy against flag raisings and proclamations, did promote the festival on their website as a way to provide recognition.

Essa, Springwater, Tay, and Tiny did not participate; Beausoleil First Nation did not reply and Canadian Forces Base Borden was not sent a request.

As well as the growth in municipal support, the festival had more events across the county garnering over a thousand in attendance during the week and 2,500 attendees at year round events according to festival organizers.

=== 2015 Pride and advocacy work ===
Mary Sue Robinet of Fierté Simcoe Pride proclaimed that Pride 2015 was to be held from July 30 to August 8. With the continued growth of support from community members, municipalities and media, there was an increased effort to get the rest of the county to participate in Fierté Simcoe Pride.

In January 2015, Robinet protested the stalling of flying the pride flag in Clearview at a Council meeting. The Township had a policy against issuing proclamations in support of organizations, and usually didn't raise flags either but in 2014, an exception was made and council agreed to fly the pride flag at the municipal office for the first time. Councillor Robert Walker me the request opposition saying that in his Christian belief he would not be supporting it. At a Council meeting later in January, residents spoke in support of raising the flag and urged Council to review its policy. After pressure from local residents and the attention of local, nation and international Pride organizations - including York Region Pride, Fierté Canada Pride and InterPride - Clearview Council reviewed its policy at the April 13 meeting and ruled in favour of issuing proclamations. Clearview has currently not approved to raise the flag due to the availability of flagpoles and flag etiquette, however Simcoe Pride is working with the township to find an appropriate place to raise the flag.

In January 2015, Tiny Township decided 4–1 to proclaim Simcoe Pride Week 2015. They also requested a flag raising. The motion revised a resolution passed in March 2007, to the effect that the Franco-Ontario flag would be raised each year during Francophone Week, but that requests for other declarations and flag raisings would not be accepted. This Council decided to consider such requests case by case.

In 2015 there was 16 proclamations, 14 flag raisings, and one banner unveiling at Orillia Soldiers' Memorial Hospital. Tay, Springwater and Essa, did not participate; Canadian Forces Base Borden was sent a request but was unable to participate, and Collingwood maintained a no flag raising and no proclamation policy but supports pride in other ways.

As of 2015, Mary Sue Robinet set in place an annual theme that would be selected for each Pride Week that reflects the current context of the queer community in the region and helps shape the festivities, the inaugural theme being "Freedom To Be."

=== Fifth anniversary and onward ===
Fierté Simcoe Pride 2016 was held from July 27 to August 6, 2016, Robinet announced the theme would be called "Celebrate." This also marked the fifth anniversary of the festival. The festival saw a record amount of support from communities, with 20 of the 22 communities within Simcoe County proclaiming Pride or holding a flag raising. This included first ever Pride flag raisings in Tay, Essa, Collingwood, and Canadian Forces Base Borden.

On June 8, 2016, Mary Sue Robinet announced that a Trans Pride March would be held during the fifth annual festivities in Orillia. Other prominent additions to the Pride festivities included the production of a "Pride Guide," a guide that included ads from inclusive businesses and services in the region as well as an events list, and an affiliate events program.

On July 6, 2016, the Township of Springwater met with Robinet to discuss waiving their procedural by-law that states that "the Township of Springwater shall not consider proclamations or resolutions dealing with matters outside its sphere of jurisdiction" to allow for a proclamation and/or flag raising. Council voted to receive the report from the Chief Administrative Office, and voted in a recorded 5–1 vote to not waive the by-law.
