= Fairy Tales Queer Film Festival =

LGBTQ film festival in Alberta, Canada

- Location: Calgary, Alberta, Canada
- Founded: 1999
- Hosted by: Calgary Queer Arts Society
- Language: International
- Website: fairytalesfilmfest.com

The Fairy Tales Queer Film Festival (formerly the Fairy Tales International Gay & Lesbian Film Festival) is an annual event held in Calgary, Alberta, Canada. Since its founding in 1999, the festival has attracted over 35,000 attendees. It is currently the longest running LGBT film festival in Alberta.

== History ==
=== Before 1999 ===
The Fairy Tales Queer Film Festival was not the first queer film festival in Calgary. In 1995, the LGBT activist organization Of Colour Collective founded The Fire I've Become queer film festival. As the festival's program schedule featured racy titles, was held at the government-funded Glenbow Museum, and received $4000 from the Canada Council for the Arts, it sparked an outcry from both citizens of Calgary and Albertan politicians. Despite the anti-LGBT picket line that formed outside of the venue, the festival was well attended. The film festival was held for a second time in 1996, but due to poor attendance, the committee for The Fire I've Become festival was dissolved. The founders of the Fairy Tales Queer Film Festival later cited The Fire I've Become festival as inspiration.

=== 1999-2003 ===
Originally a collaboration between the Calgary Society of Independent Filmmakers (CSIF) and the Gay & Lesbian Community Services Association (later known as Calgary Outlink), the first Fairy Tales International Gay & Lesbian Film Festival was founded by Calgarian LGBT activists and CSIF volunteers and employees Trevor Alberts, Kelly Langgard, and Kevin Allen.

The first incarnation was held was held in June 1999 during Calgary Pride at the Garry Theatre (now the Ironwood Stage and Grill) in Inglewood. The two-day festival caused significant controversy, largely due to the inclusion of Sandi Somers' erotic lesbian film Gens de Phoque (1994). It was subject to a number of bomb threats and many festival-goers wore masks or paper bags to avoid being publicly outed by photojournalists waiting outside of the theatre.

Despite being a part of CSIF, the Fairy Tales Film Festival experienced financial difficulty for the first several years of production. Due to censorship associated with government funding and the homophobia from Albertan taxpayers experienced during The Fire I've Become festival, Fairy Tales chose to be entirely privately funded and volunteer-run.

=== 2004-2017 ===
In 2004, the film festival separated from the Calgary Society of Independent Filmmakers to become an independent non-profit known as the Fairy Tales Presentation Society. After separating, the organization expanded considerably, stretching the festival from three days to seven days and adding a series of panel discussions.

In 2009, the Fairy Tales Presentation Society developed the OUTReels Diversity Education Program. The program involves members of the organization presenting workshops, showing films, and facilitating discussion to inform the public about LGBT topics.

Part of the OUTReels Diversity Education Program included the introduction of the It Gets Better Project-inspired Youth Anti-Homophobia PSA Program in 2011. In 2013, this became the Youth Queer Mentorship Program. The course teaches youth aged 16–24 how to create films which are then presented at the film festival.

In 2017, the society attained The Coming Out Monologues, YYC. Founded in 2009 and based on Rodrigo Hernandez' 2007 show of the same name, the Monologues are a stage show in which performers write a piece of original work about their coming out story.

Additionally in 2017, the society held the first annual Ally Toolkit Conference.

The society was a registered Canadian charity from December 12, 2005, until July 31, 2018.

=== 2018-Present ===
In 2018, in conjunction with the 20th anniversary of the film festival, the Fairy Tales Presentation Society rebranded as Calgary Queer Arts Society. While the society still houses the Fairy Tales Queer Film Festival, they moved their focus from only film to all queer arts in Calgary.

Along with the rebranding, the society produced a documentary for the 20th anniversary. The documentary, Outliers: Calgary's Queer History, followed the history of the queer community in Calgary from the arrest of George Klippert to modern day.

== See also ==
- List of LGBT film festivals
- List of film festivals in Canada
