= Anne Fulton =

Anne Fulton may refer to:

- Anne Hope, née Fulton, English historian
- Anne Fulton (activist), Canadian LGBT activist
