= Calgary Queer Arts Society =

Canadian nonprofit organization

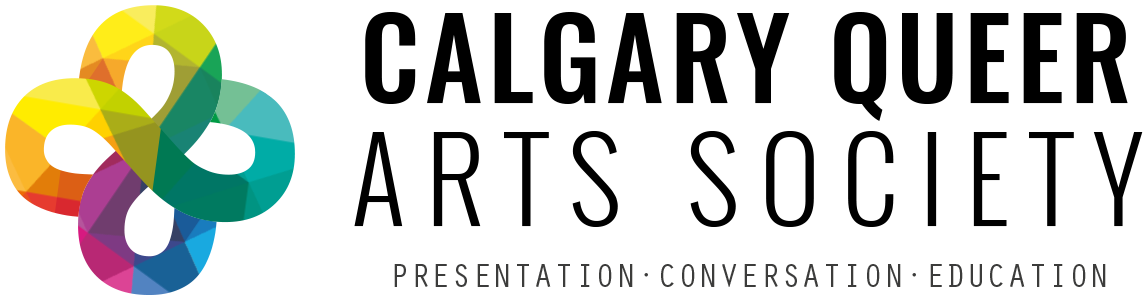
- Founded: 2004, Renamed in 2018
- Type: Nonprofit organization
- Registration no.: 85777120 8RR0001
- Purpose: Queer arts
- Location: Calgary, Alberta, Canada
- Region served: Canada
- Website: www.calgaryqueerartssociety.com

Calgary Queer Arts Society (CQAS) is a Canadian registered nonprofit organization. First established as the Fairy Tales Presentation Society in 2004, the organization rebranded as the Calgary Queer Arts Society in 2018. It seeks to give a voice to queer people through storytelling. Currently, the organization runs the Fairy Tales Queer Film Festival, Coming Out Monologues YYC, OUTReels Diversity Education Program, and the Ally Toolkit Conference.

== History ==
Originally a collaboration between the Calgary Society of Independent Filmmakers (CSIF) and the Gay & Lesbian Community Services Association (later known as Calgary Outlink), the first Fairy Tales International Gay & Lesbian Film Festival was founded by Calgarian LGBT activists and CSIF volunteers and employees Trevor Alberts, Kelly Langgard, and Kevin Allen.

In 2004, the film festival separated from the Calgary Society of Independent Filmmakers to become an independent non-profit known as the Fairy Tales Presentation Society. After separating, the organization expanded considerably, stretching the festival from three days to seven days and adding a series of panel discussions.

In 2018, the Fairy Tales Presentation Society rebranded as the Calgary Queer Arts Society. The new brand was largely influenced by the organization's desire to extend beyond the film festival and support all forms of queer art in Calgary.

In 2019, the society received $75,000 from Western Economic Diversification Canada to aid tourism in Western Canada.

== Programs ==
=== Coming Out Monologues YYC ===
The Coming Out Monologues YYC (frequently referred to as TCOM) is an annual stage show featuring LGBT people performing original monologues about their coming out experience. TCOM was founded in 2010 by the Campaign for Positive Space at the University of Calgary. It is based on Rodrigo Hernandez' show of the same name, originally performed in 2007 at the University of California, Riverside.

Early incarnations of the show featured performers reciting pre-scripted monologues which were presented at the original 2007 show in California. As of 2013, all monologues that appear in the show are original and written by the performer. In 2014, TCOM separated from the University of Calgary and became an independent organization that was associated with the Fairy Tales Presentation Society. In 2017, the show was officially acquired by the Fairy Tales Presentation Society.

Throughout its history, TCOM has featured several spin-off series. This includes The Coming Out in Faith Monologues in 2015, 2016, and 2018; Coming Out After Dark in 2015; The Coming Out Monologues: Passionate Kisses in 2016; and Queer Folks Read Things They Wrote Once Upon a Time (in the Closet) in 2016 and 2017.

Year	Dates	Location	Ticket Price	Organization Helped by Proceeds
2010	March 19	Boris Roubakine Recital Hall, University of Calgary	$5	Calgary Outlink
2011	March 17, 18	Boris Roubakine Recital Hall, University of Calgary	$10	Calgary Outlink
2012	March 15, 16	Boris Roubakine Recital Hall, University of Calgary	$10	Camp FYrefly
2013	March 13, 14, 15	Boris Roubakine Recital Hall, University of Calgary	$10	Calgary Centre for Sexuality (formerly Calgary Sexual Health Centre)
2014	March 19, 20, 21	John Dutton Theatre, Calgary Public Library	$15; $12 for students and low-income individuals	Calgary Two-Spirit Youth Group (run by the Boys & Girls Clubs of Canada and hosted by Calgary Outlink)
2015	March 18, 18, 20	John Dutton Theatre, Calgary Public Library	$15; $12 for students and seniors	
2016	March 16, 17, 18	John Dutton Theatre, Calgary Public Library	$15; $12 for students and seniors	
2017	March 22, 23, 24	John Dutton Theatre, Calgary Public Library	$15; $12 for students and seniors	
2018	March 21, 22, 23	John Dutton Theatre, Calgary Public Library	$15; $12 for students and seniors	
2019	March 20, 21, 22	Patricia A. Whelan Presentation Hall, Calgary Central Library	$15; $12 for students and seniors	
2020	Originally scheduled for March 19–21. Postponed due to the COVID-19 pandemic.	Patricia A. Whelan Presentation Hall, Calgary Central Library	$15; $10 for students, seniors, and members	

=== OUTReels Diversity Education Program ===
The OUTReels Diversity Education Program was originally created in 2009 with the purpose of teaching communities about diversity and inclusion. The program consists of a variety of workshops surrounding subjects such as LGBT history, LGBT terminology, and allyship. As of 2020, the program has hosted over 500 workshops throughout Alberta.

=== Ally Toolkit Conference ===
First held in 2017, The Ally Toolkit Conference is an annual conference presented by the society with the purpose of teaching allies how to better their allyship and bring those skills into their communities. The conference has a strong focus on hosting LGBT speakers and allowing attendees to ask questions in a safe space without judgement. While the conference originally focused on general allyship, later incarnations have focused on specific sectors such healthcare.

== Controversies ==
In November 2020, the CQAS was accused by a former employee of engaging in racist practices. In response, the organization released a public statement saying they intended to create an Anti-Racism Committee, add five seats to their committee board specifically for people of colour, hire a person of colour as their Director of Programs, and mandate anti-racist training for their staff.

== See also ==
- Fairy Tales Queer Film Festival
