= The Chosen Family =

Comic strip by Noreen Stevens

The Chosen Family was a Canadian comic strip, written and drawn by Winnipeg cartoonist Noreen Stevens from 1987 to 2004. The strip evolved from an earlier project, Local Access Only, published in the University of Manitoba newspaper, The Manitoban. The Chosen Family used social and political satire to shine a light on late 20th century queer experience through Stevens' lens as lesbian feminist. It featured four on-going characters, lesbians Kenneth-Marie and Weed, whose relationship was undefined, and the couple's friends and neighbours, Puddin' Head and The Straight Chick Upstairs. Later the strip also featured Kenneth-Marie and Weed's two fostered/adopted children, a daughter named Rosebud and an unnamed son.

The strip appeared in many LGBT publications throughout North America, including Xtra!, Xtra West, Swerve, Perceptions, off our backs, Chicago Outlines, Herizons, Ms. and the Washington Blade. It also appeared in mainstream general interest publications such as Geist.

Stevens retired the strip in 2004 after producing almost 400 biweekly semi-serialize installments.
