= Winter Pride =

Winter Pride may refer to:

- Winter Pride (Guelph), a Canadian LGBT pride festival in Guelph, Ontario created by Guelph Pride
- Winter Pride (Ottawa), a Canadian LGBT pride festival in Ottawa, Ontario and Gatineau, Quebec created by Capital Pride
- Winter Pride, an annual festival in Queenstown, New Zealand
