= Varese Pride =

LGBTQ event in Varese, Italy

- Genre: Festival
- Frequency: Annually
- Locations: Varese, Italy
- Years active: 2016-present
- Website: www.varesepride.it

Varese Pride is a pride parade in Varese, Italy. The first event was held in 2016. It is managed and controlled by Arcigay Varese. It is one of the three Pride Parades in Lombardy and one of the 20 Pride Parades in Italy. It is a member of InterPride and EPOA.

== 2016 ==
The first Pride Parade received the patronage of Province of Varese, US General Consulate in Milan and University of Insubria, but not by the Municipality of Varese (Comune di Varese) that refused the patronage because "In the city, people have diverse opinions and sensitivity". This has caused protests by the local LGBTI Organization Arcigay Varese.

The slogan of the first edition was, "(R)Esistiamo" in Italian, a fusion of the two words Resist and exist.

Over 3,000 participants took part in the first event.
