= Chosen Family =

Chosen Family may refer to:

- "Chosen Family" (song), a song by Rina Sawayama
- "Chosen Family", a 2024 song by Collar
- Chosen Family (film), a 2024 American comedy-drama film
- The Chosen Family, a Canadian comic strip

== See also ==
- Chosen family
- Chosen Family Tree, a Kree Harrison album
