= Marsha H. Levine =

Founder of InterPride

- Born: Washington, D.C., U.S.
- Occupations: Community Relations Manager; Event Coordinator; Activist
- Years active: 43
- Employer: San Francisco Pride

Marsha H. Levine is an LGBTQI+ activist and Pride movement organizer.

She is the founder of InterPride and active in leading other organizations related to LGBTQI+ Pride events since 1980. She served as San Francisco's Pride Parade Manager for 18 years.

== Early life ==
Marsha was born in Washington, D.C., and spent the first 6 years of her life growing up in Virginia before her family relocated to Newton, Massachusetts. When she was about 12-years-old, they moved to Greenwich, Connecticut. In 1968, as the war in Vietnam waged and unrest grew on national high school and college campuses, so did her awareness of human and civil rights issues. This continued through her early college years, and when she joined the Boston Lesbian/Gay Pride Committee (having returned to Massachusetts) in 1980. Now focused on LGBTQI+ rights, she became their president in 1982.

== Activism ==
Levine was one of four Vice Presidents of Global Outreach & Partnership Management at InterPride, and a co-president of USAP (United States Association of Prides). Past positions include working on and serving as President of the Boston Lesbian/Gay Pride Committee, and upon moving to San Francisco in 1985, the San Francisco Lesbian, Gay, Bisexual, Transgender Pride Parade and Celebration Committee, Inc.

In January 2018, Levine became the Community Relations and Facilities Manager for the San Francisco LGBT Pride Celebration Committee, serving until October 2023. She currently serves as a seasonal contractor for the organization.
