= GuySpy =

Online dating application

- Release: 2011
- Operating system: iOS, Android
- Available in: English, French, Spanish, German, Italian, Dutch, Hungarian, Japanese, Chinese, Thai, Portuguese
- Type: Geosocial networking
- Website: www.guyspy.com

GuySpy is a location based online social network, gay dating app. It is available on Android, iOS and via web browser. The app uses location based services like GPS to connect gay, bi and curious men. Through their platform users are able to create profiles with detailed descriptions and with multiple photos. They are able to chat with guys around them, and send additional photos, have video messaging and provide their exact location. There is a voice option within the app as well. The app is similar to Grindr, GuySpy also has a map feature that allows the users to search for other guys in other towns and cities.

== History ==
The app was officially launched in 2011 for GayWhistler's WinterPride festival. In 2013, GuySpy launched The PEARL Pride Party app, which was helping users to keep up to date, build and maintain a personal schedule, share information via social networks related to global LGBT pride events and circuit parties.

The app was founded in 2010 originally by Stark Mobile and was purchased by Pink Triangle Press in 2017.

== Controversies ==
GuySpy has run into difficulties with Facebook's Community Standards several times. In 2012 their Facebook page was blocked for over 30 days, and later they posted an image of a nude man and it was taken down within few hours. GuySpy has challenged Facebook's community standards, considering them to be homophobic as they allowed similar images that showed women.

The app's 2013 billboard campaign in Vancouver received complaints. The complainant alleged that the advertisement offended standards of public decency. The ad was showing two men, one sitting on the other's back with the phrase "Taste the difference" According to the council's opinion the words crossed the line of the acceptability of Clause 14.

== See also ==
- List of LGBT social networking services
- Homosocialization
- Timeline of online dating services
- Tinder
