= Noreen Stevens =

Canadian cartoonist (born 1962)

- Born: 1962 (age 63–64) Sault Ste. Marie, Ontario, Canada
- Area: Cartoonist
- Notable works: The Chosen Family
- Spouse: Jill Town (2006–present)
- Children: 2

Noreen Stevens (born 1962) is a Canadian cartoonist, who illustrated and wrote the lesbian comic strip The Chosen Family. Her work in the field of comics began in 1984. The Chosen Family is featured in the ensemble comic book Dyke Strippers: Lesbian Cartoonists from A to Z alongside the likes of Diane DiMassa and Alison Bechdel.

== Early life ==
Stevens was born in Sault Ste. Marie, Ontario, and grew up in Mississauga, Ontario, and Strathroy, Ontario. She graduated from the University of Manitoba with a bachelor's degree in interior design in 1985.

== Career ==
After graduating Stevens realized she wanted to dedicate her time to creating and illustrating comics. She began working on a comic strip titled Local Access Only which was published in the University of Manitoba's student newspaper from 1986 to 1987. In 1987, the Manitoba Arts Council granted Stevens $5,000 in order to help fund her renowned comic strip The Chosen Family. Also in that same year, she began producing and self-syndicating bi-weekly strips to LGBTQ+ newspapers and magazines in Canada, the US, the UK and Australia, including Xtra!, Swerve, Herizons, Chicago Outlines and The Washington Blade.

In 1991, Stevens worked with photographer Sheila Spence to create an artist collective called Average Good Looks. Their goal was to mount billboards across Winnipeg that would condemn homophobia in Canada through a series of photographs of queer people in different scenarios, in order to normalize homosexuality in the early 1990s. The pictures contained text that read: "Lesbian, it's not a dirty word," and "Gays & Lesbians, your family." These billboards also contained phone numbers, purposefully placed in order to see the kind of answering machine messages they would receive. The result was a pile up of homophobic messages, which Stevens and Spence played for the first time during a gallery show labeled Passion Pink. Homophobia Is Killing Us, was then created and soon stretched to 14 different locations further from Winnipeg into Calgary, Edmonton, Regina, and Saskatoon.

In 1992, Stevens collaborated with Ellen Orleans on her collection of essays titled Can't Keep a Straight Face, where Stevens illustrated all the visual material. In March 1993, Stevens was featured in Roz Warren's anthology Mothers!. In 1995, Stevens' work was featured in the anthology of comics from 20 different women cartoonists titled Men are From Detroit, Women are From Paris. In 1996, Stevens collaborated with Ellen Orleans again on her second collection of essays titled Still Can't Keep a Straight Face.

From September 1997 to April 1998, Stevens' The Chosen Family appeared several times in the pages of Canadian comic strips OH... (Issues #19-22).

Stevens' strips also appeared in The Body Politic, Ms., Gay Comix, A Queer Sense of Humor, Weenie-Toons!, the Women's Glib series, and several feminist and LGBTQ+ anthologies. Stevens retired The Chosen Family in 2004 after producing almost 400 semi-serialized installments of the strip. Her last public online article is posted in the Xtra! webpage titled 'Strathroy suicide shows how teasing can kill.'

== Personal life ==
From 1993 to 1995, Stevens was an owner and the manager of Winona's Coffee and Ice, the first gay and lesbian café in Winnipeg. In 2003, Stevens and her partner, Jill Town, were the first same-sex couple in Manitoba to jointly adopt two children, Dillon and Savannah Stevens, whom they had fostered since birth. Their adoption experience was featured on a 2009 episode of the Discovery Health Channel series Adoption Stories. In 2006, Stevens married Jill Town.
