= Gay Alliance for Equality =

First gay rights organization in Nova Scotia

The Gay Alliance for Equality (GAE) was the first organization in the Canadian province of Nova Scotia to advocate for gay rights. Founded in May 1972, it was incorporated in 1973 and renamed the Gay and Lesbian Association (GALA) in 1988.

The goal of the Gay Alliance for Equality was to provide education about homosexuality, offer resources and support to the gay community, and seek changes to laws which discriminated against gay people. Among GAE's programs were the "Gayline", a help line for gay people; the Gazette, a newsletter; and the coordination of activities to commemorate Pride Week.

GAE opened the Turret in January 1976, which was the only gay bar in Halifax for many years. The Turret became a significant aspect of Halifax's gay community, and in 1978 hosted a national conference of gay organizations. The Turret shut down in 1982, later re-opening as Rumours Bar.

The Gay and Lesbian Association shut down in 1995 due to financial struggles.

== See also ==
- Anne Fulton (activist)
- Halifax Pride
- Same-sex marriage in Nova Scotia
