= InterPride =

Nonprofit organization

- International Association of Pride Organizers
- Founded: October 1982
- Founders: Marsha H. Levine; Rick Turner (deceased)
- Type: 501(c)(3)
- Purpose: Organizations producing LGBT pride parades
- Region served: Global
- Method: Capacity building, networking, sharing knowledge
- Website: https://www.interpride.org/
- Formerly called: National Association of Lesbian/Gay Pride Coordinators; International Association of Lesbian/Gay Pride Coordinators; International Association of Lesbian, Gay, Bisexual and Transgender Pride Coordinators

InterPride is the international organization that brings together Pride organizers from across the World to network, share knowledge, and maximize impact. To this end, Pride organizers design InterPride's structure, programs, and initiatives, to better support them at the local, regional, and global levels. InterPride also owns the label WorldPride, which the membership licenses to a member organization through a direct vote.

== History ==
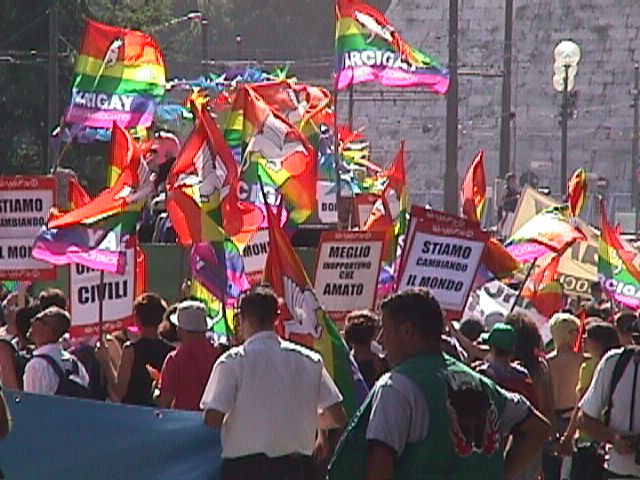
Image from the first WorldPride, held in Rome on July 8, 2000

InterPride was incorporated as a 501(c)(3) non-profit organization in Texas in the 1980s. The organization was originally known as the National Association of Lesbian/Gay Pride Coordinators (NAL/GPC), before changing the name to International Association of Lesbian/Gay Pride Coordinators (IAL/GPC) in October 1985, the International Association of Lesbian, Gay, Bisexual and Transgender Pride Coordinators at the conference in West Hollywood, California, and eventually to InterPride in the late 1990s.

=== Formation of InterPride ===
In April 1981, Pride Coordinators Rick Turner and Marsha H. Levine, from San Francisco and Boston respectively, met at a "call to unite" for a gay and lesbian leadership conference in Los Angeles, to start an organization then known as NOLAG (National Organization of Lesbians and Gays). While discussing common issues that their individual Pride organizations faced, and remarking that their connections with the New York Pride and Los Angeles Pride committees were helpful for problem-solving, Rick and Marsha felt this trading of information was important and could develop into a potential network.

More than a year later in August 1982, Levine sent out a call for the First Annual Conference of the National Association of Lesbian/Gay Pride Coordinators (NAL/GPC), to meet in Boston. Rick Turner (now deceased) declined joining in establishing the organization, due to his deteriorating health. With the aid of San Diego Pride Committee chairperson Doug Moore, who had been collecting a list of national pride organizations, and with small donations from the Los Angeles and Boston Pride Committees, the mailing list from Moore was used to distribute a self-mailing registration form designed and produced by Levine. Though many committees expressed an interest in attending, most didn't have the funds to send delegates at that time.

On October 9, 1982, in Hill House on Beacon Hill, members from the Boston, Chicago, Los Angeles, New York, San Diego, and San Francisco Pride committees gathered in response to Levine's mailing. Three long tables were pushed together to make a triangular seating area. For two days many topics concerning coordinating LGBT prides was discussed, and while each city had different events, they discovered much of the planning and logistics was surprisingly similar. They voted to hold a second conference in San Diego the next year.

=== Milestones ===
Date	Milestone
October 1985	During the organization's conference in Fort Lauderdale, Florida, with representatives of Toronto, Ontario, and Germany in attendance, the membership voted to officially change the organization's name from the National Association of Lesbian/Gay Pride Coordinators, to the International Association of Lesbian/Gay Pride Coordinators (IAL/GPC). The organization also pledged to continue reaching out to other countries.
October 1997	During the organization's conference in New York, its membership voted to establish the "WorldPride" title and awarded it to the city of Rome, Italy, for the year 2000.
October 1999	The first conference held outside North America, in Glasgow, Scotland.
October 2001	The first conference held in the Southern Hemisphere, in Auckland, New Zealand. Delegates were welcomed by the New Zealand Prime Minister.
October 2003	The first conference held in a city that did not use English as its primary language, in Montreal, Quebec. The conference itself was still conducted in English.
October 2004	The 22nd annual InterPride conference and the first conference held in a non-English speaking country, in Reykjavík, Iceland.
May 2005	The second WorldPride was postponed until August 2006, due to military and religious unrest in the region.
June 2019	Stonewall 50 – WorldPride NYC 2019 included Human Rights conference, festival and Pride March with 150,000 pre-registered participants among 695 groups.
June 2020	In response to the COVID-19 pandemic, co-produced Global Pride, reached more than 200 million people globally, thanks to coverage around the world, including in global titles Time Magazine, Forbes.
October 2022	The first ever General Meeting & World Conference in Latin America takes place in Guadalajara, Mexico.

== Membership ==
As of October 26, 2022, InterPride includes 338 member organizations from 70 countries.

== Annual General Meeting & World Conference ==
During the last three decades, pride organizations from almost every continent have participated in InterPride's annual world conference.

The conference is held each year in a different city, with the location of upcoming conferences being voted on two years prior to their occurrence. To demonstrate a commitment to support and empower the global LGBTI+ Pride community, the conference is now frequently held outside North America. Scholarships, through the Pamela O'Brien Memorial Scholarship Fund, are available for member organizations that cannot afford to attend. O'Brien was a longtime member of Cape Cod Pride in Massachusetts, US and served InterPride as a Regional Director and Vice President of Operations.

In addition, several regional Pride networks hold their own conferences independent of InterPride.

World Conference and General Meetings
Year	Host country	Host city	Host organization(s)	Theme
1982	United States	Boston	Boston Pride	—N/a
1983	United States	San Diego	San Diego Pride	—N/a
1984	United States	Wichita	Wichita Pride	Unity & More in '84
1985	United States	Fort Lauderdale	Fort Lauderdale Pride	Alive with Pride in '85
1986	United States	San Francisco	San Francisco Pride	Forward Together
1987	United States	Baltimore	Baltimore Pride	Proud, Strong, United
1988	United States	St. Louis	Pride St. Louis	Rightfully Proud
1989	Canada	Vancouver	Vancouver Pride Society	Stonewall 20 – A Generation of Pride
1990	United States	Minneapolis	Twin Cities Pride	Look to the Future
1991	United States	Boston	Boston Pride	Together in Pride
1992	United States	Long Beach	Long Beach Pride	Pride = Power
1993	United States	Houston	Houston Pride	A Family of Pride
1994	United States	Fort Lauderdale	Fort Lauderdale Pride	Stonewall 25 – A Global Celebration of Lesbian & Gay Pride & Protest
1995	United States	Phoenix	Phoenix Pride	Pride – From Silence to Celebration
1996	United States	Kansas City	Kansas City Pride	Pride Without Borders
1997	United States	New York City	NYC Pride	Equality Through Visibility
1998	United States	West Hollywood	West Hollywood Pride	Unity Through Diversity
1999	United Kingdom	Glasgow	Glasgow Pride	Prideful Past, Powerful Future
2000	United States	Atlanta	Atlanta Pride	Take Pride, Take Joy, Take Action
2001	New Zealand	Auckland	Auckland Pride	Embrace Diversity
2002	United States	San Francisco	San Francisco Pride	Pride Worldwide
2003	Canada	Montreal	Fierté Montréal	Peace Through Pride
2004	Iceland	Reykjavík	Reykjavik Pride	Vive La Difference
2005	United States	Minneapolis	Twin Cities Pride	Equal Rights. No More. No Less.
2006	United States	Portland	Portland Pride	Pride – Not Prejudice
2007	Switzerland	Zürich	Zurich Pride	United For Equality
2008	Canada	Vancouver	Vancouver Pride Society	Live Love Be
2009	United States	St. Petersburg	St. Petersburg Pride	Your Rights, Our Rights, Human Rights
2010	United States	Long Beach	Long Beach Pride	One Heart, One World, One Pride
2011	Belgium	Brussels	Brussels Pride	Pride Around the World
2012	United States	Boston	Boston Pride	Pride Links Us Together
2013	Canada	Montreal	Fierté Montréal	Pride 365
2014	United States	Pittsburgh	Pittsburgh Pride	Reflections of Pride – Stonewall 45
2015	United States	Las Vegas	Las Vegas Pride	Color Our World with Pride
2016	France	Montpellier	Montpellier Pride	Solidarity Through Pride
2017	United States	Indianapolis	Indianapolis Pride	Viva la Vida
2018	Canada	Saskatoon	Saskatoon Pride	Remember the Past, Create the Future
2019	Greece	Athens	Athens Pride	Millions of Moments of Pride
2020	Norway	Oslo	Oslo Pride	Exist. Persist. Resist.
2021	Hosted online due to the COVID-19 pandemic			#YouAreIncluded
2022	Mexico	Guadalajara	Guadalajara Pride	From Silence to Solidarity (English); Del Silencio a la Solidaridad (Spanish); Do Silêncio à Solidariedade (Portuguese); Du Silence à la solidarité (French)
2023	United States	San Diego	San Diego Pride	—N/a
2024	Colombia	Medellín	Corporación Stonewall	—N/a
2025	Hosted online to "increase language justice and accessibility globally"			—N/a
2026	Thailand	Phuket	Phuket Pride; FOR-SOGI; Bangkok Pride	—N/a
2027	Italy	Rome	Rome Pride; Circolo di Cultura Omosessuale Mario Mieli	—N/a

== WorldPride ==
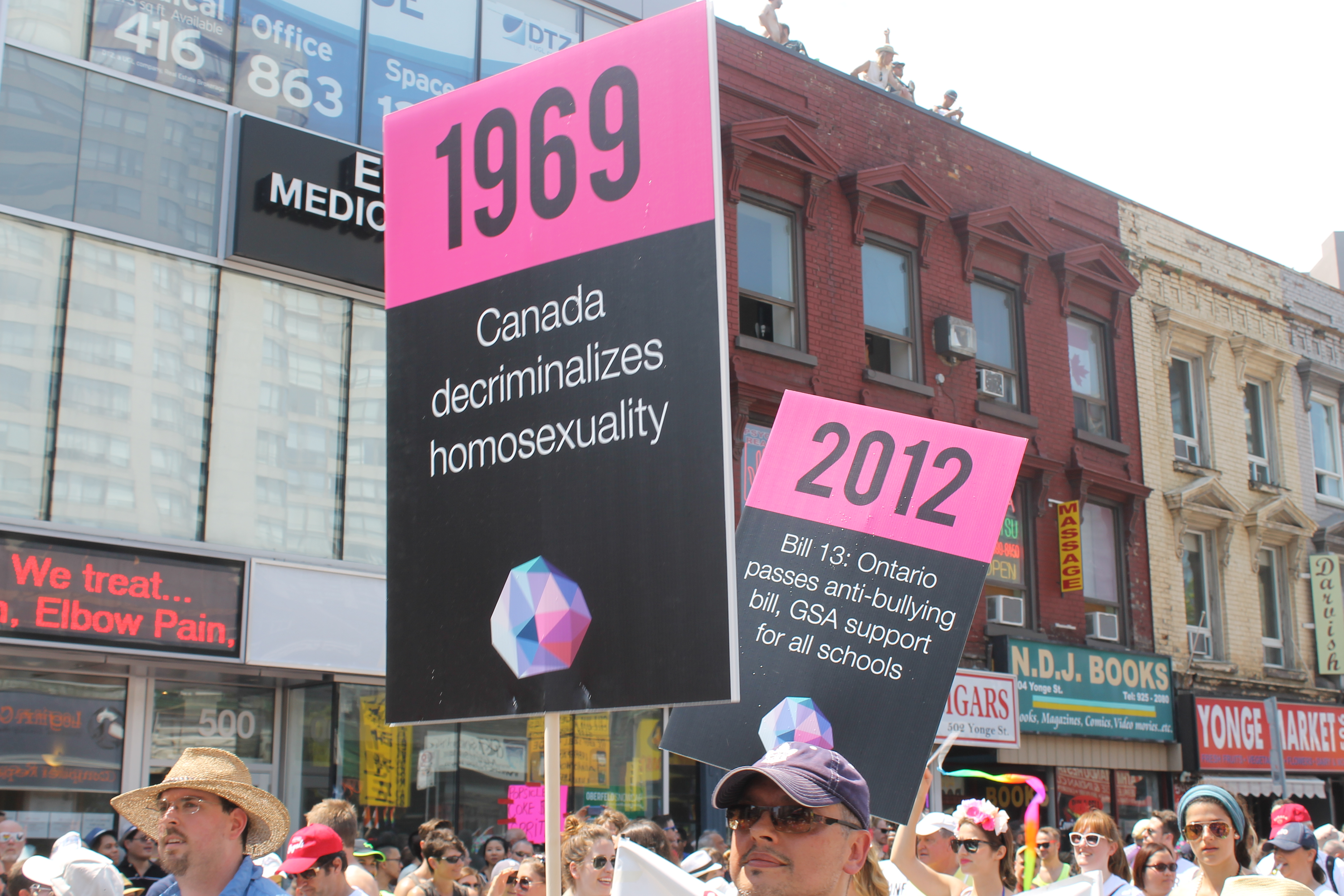
Marchers at Pride Toronto WorldPride 2014 with signs commemorating significant events in LGBT history in Canada

WorldPride, licensed by InterPride and organized by one of its members, is an event that promotes visibility and awareness of lesbian, gay, bisexual and transgender (LGBT pride) issues on an international level. WorldPride includes pride parades and/or marches (which may either coincide with the host city's existing pride parade or a separate parade organized specifically for the event), an LGBT human rights conference, arts and culture festivals, and other activities.

At the 1997 InterPride General Meeting and World Conference in New York City, InterPride members voted to award the inaugural WorldPride to be held in Rome, Italy in 2000. Since then, host cities of WorldPride were selected by the members of InterPride during the General Meeting and World Conference, with WorldPride events usually being held every two years. Due to its scale and the bidding process in selecting the event's host city, WorldPride was colloquially referred to as "the gay Olympics" by several media outlets.

Editions of WorldPride
Edn	Year	Host country(s)	Host city(s)	Host organization(s)	Date(s)	Theme	Notes
1	2000	Italy	Rome	Circolo di Cultura Omosessuale Mario Mieli	1 – 9 July	In Pride We Trust	Event coincided with the Catholic Church's Great Jubilee and the 7th EuroPride festivities.
2	2006	Israel	Jerusalem	Jerusalem Open House	6 – 12 August; 10 November (parade)	Love Without Borders	Initially scheduled for 2005, but was delayed a year later due to emerging tensions from the Israeli disengagement from the Gaza Strip. The scheduled parade was denied a permit owing to the 2006 Lebanon War and was instead held months later on 10 November at Jerusalem's Givat Ram Stadium.
3	2012	United Kingdom	London	Pride London	7 July	—N/a	Held just ahead of the London Olympic and Paralympic Games and during the year-long celebrations of Queen Elizabeth II's Diamond Jubilee and the city's hosting of the 19th EuroPride festivities.
4	2014	Canada	Toronto	Pride Toronto	20 – 29 June	Rise Up	First WorldPride event in North America.
5	2017	Spain	Madrid	Madrid Pride	23 June – 2 July	Whoever you love, Madrid loves you!	Event coincided with the city's hosting of the 24th EuroPride festivities.
6	2019	United States	New York City	NYC Pride; Heritage of Pride	1 – 30 June	Millions of moments of Pride	Event coincided with the 50th anniversary of the Stonewall riots.
7	2021	Denmark; Sweden	Copenhagen and Malmö	Copenhagen Pride; Malmö Pride	12 – 22 August	#YouAreIncluded	First WorldPride event hosted in two cities in two countries. It also coincided with Copenhagen's hosting of the 27th EuroPride festivities and the two cities' hosting of the 2021 EuroGames, an LGBTI+ inclusive sporting event that included 29 sports with an estimated 6,000 athletes attending.
8	2023	Australia	Sydney	Sydney Gay and Lesbian Mardi Gras	17 February – 5 March	Gather, Dream, Amplify	First WorldPride event in the Southern Hemisphere and the Asia-Pacific region, which provided a focus on LGBTI rights and communities of the Asia-Pacific region including a First Nations Hub dedicated to showcasing Aboriginal and Torres Strait Islander arts and culture.
9	2025	~~Taiwan~~	~~Kaohsiung~~	~~Kaohsiung Pride~~	Cancelled		Event would have been the first WorldPride event in the Asian continent. However, in August 2022, the WorldPride 2025 Taiwan Preparation Committee announced that it would give up hosting the event due to conflicts over the branding of the event.
9	2025	United States	Washington, D.C.	Capital Pride Alliance	29 May – 8 June	The Fabric of Freedom	Event was organized in the city as planned despite InterPride issuing a travel advisory to the United States effective 13 March 2025 in the wake of the second presidency of Donald Trump and the issuance of executive orders targeting the transgender community.
10	2026	Netherlands	Amsterdam	Pride Amsterdam	25 July – 8 August	Unity	Event will coincide with the city's hosting of the 32nd EuroPride festivities and the 25th anniversary of the legalization of same-sex marriage in the Netherlands, which made the country the first nation in the world to do so.
11	2028	South Africa	Cape Town	Cape Town Pride	TBA	TBA	Event is set to be the first WorldPride event in Africa.

== Controversies ==
The hosting of the 2025 WorldPride event was initially awarded to the city of Kaohsiung, Taiwan, in 2021 during the 40th InterPride General Meeting and World Conference, which was supposed to be the first WorldPride held in Asia. However, Taiwanese organizers withdrew from hosting the event after allegations that InterPride rolled back on a decision to name the event as "WorldPride 2025, Taiwan" and instead proposed "WorldPride 2025, Kaohsiung" which sparked suspicion from the public that the name change was politically-motivated due to Chinese government policies that do not recognize Taiwan as a separate country from China. InterPride refuted this claim with the support of Taiwanese Pride organizers who were privy to the contract negotiation. The hosting rights for WorldPride 2025 was later awarded to Washington, D.C., United States in 2022 during the 41st General Meeting and World Conference in Guadalajara, Mexico.

== See also ==
- WorldPride
- Europride
- List of LGBT events
