= GO Info =

Canadian LGBT newspaper

- Formation: July 1972
- Dissolved: September 1995
- Type: LGBT organization based in Ottawa, Ontario, Canada
- Legal status: inactive
- Purpose: advocate and public voice, educator and network
- Headquarters: Ottawa, Ontario, Canada
- Region served: Ottawa, Ontario, Canada
- Official language: English, French

GO Info was a monthly newspaper for the lesbian, gay, bisexual and transgender communities in Ottawa, Ontario, Canada, from July 1972 to September 1995.

GO Info was a volunteer-operated newspaper that was established by "Gays of Ottawa", which experienced much change in its name reflecting the changing face of the community in which it served. In the mid-1980s, the organization became the "Association of Lesbians and Gays of Ottawa". In a resolution passed in the mid-1990s, the name of the supporting organization was again changed to the "Association of Lesbians, Gays, and Bisexuals of Ottawa".

GO Info, like its supporting organization, changed as well. When Xtra! magazine from Toronto launched an Ottawa edition, Capital Xtra!, in 1993, GO Info tried to become more competitive in content, and to solicit corporate advertising.

In September 1995, Go Info ceased publication.

== See also ==
- List of Ottawa media outlets
