= Wayves =

Canadian LGBT magazine

- Editor: Randall Perry (to 09/2011)
- Categories: LGBT magazine
- Frequency: Monthly
- Publisher: Daniel MacKay
- Founded: 1983
- Final issue: 2012 (print)
- Country: Canada
- Based in: Halifax, Nova Scotia
- Website: www.wayves.ca
- ISSN: 1713-1057

Wayves is a volunteer-run news website devoted to the interests of 2SLGBTQIA+ people in Atlantic Canada.

Wayves (ISSN 1713-1057) was originally a Canadian print magazine, published 11 times yearly in Halifax, Nova Scotia for the lesbian, gay, bisexual and transgender communities in Atlantic Canada. The website hosts an archive of past print editions of Wayves and its precursor publication, the Gaezette.

The magazine was published by a non-profit organization. It was first published in 1983 as a local community newsletter under the name Gaezette. Wayves was in regular monthly production between 1988 and 2012. The magazine adopted its current name in 1995.

In 2012, editor Raymond Taavel was murdered by a man with paranoid schizophrenia. Wayves continues as an online publication. Online activity slowed for a while, but the online magazine began to publish articles from a broader group of contributors after a technical update in 2023. The online magazine is published by a collective, with articles written and submitted by members of the public.
