= Boston Pride (event) =

Parade in Boston

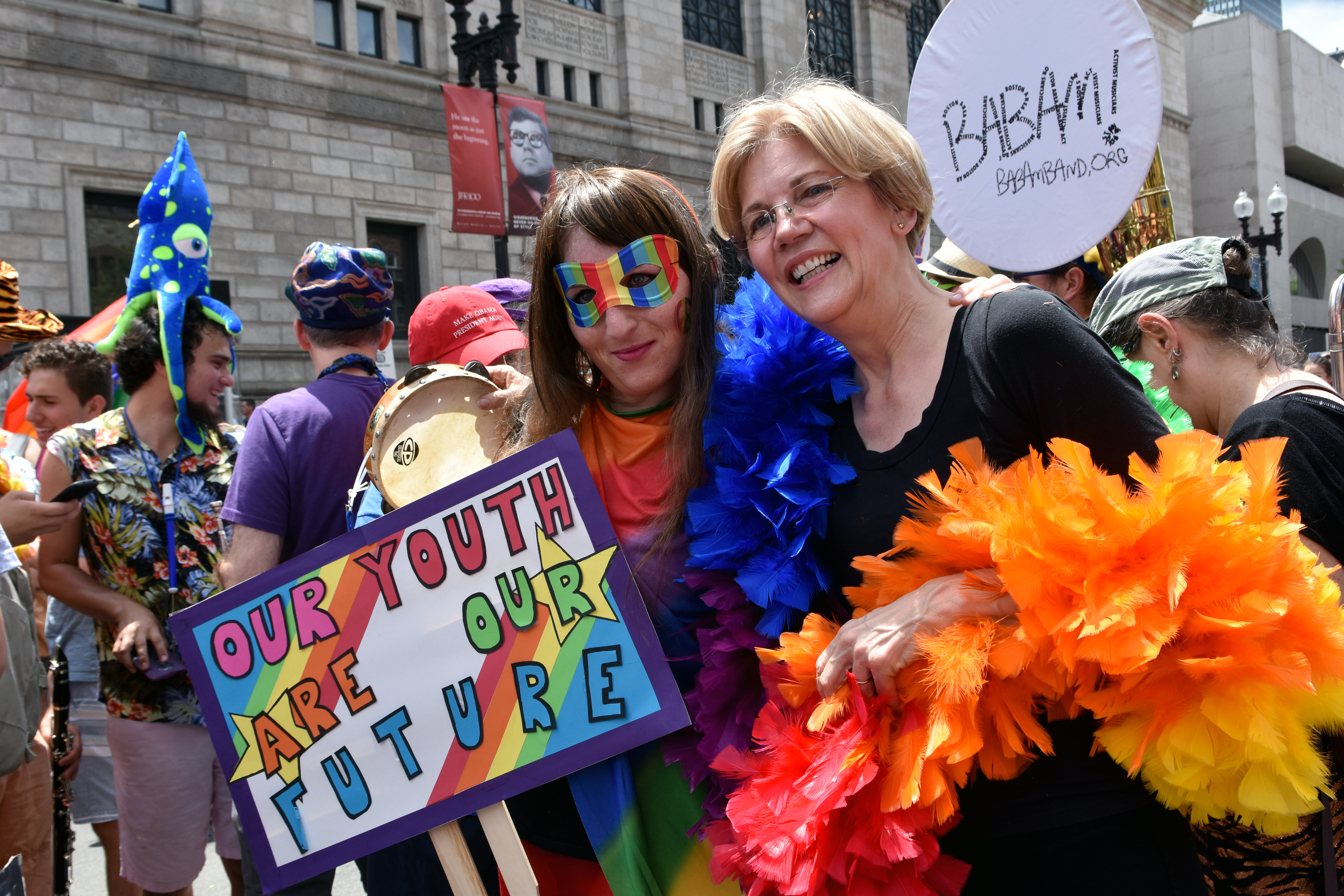
- A photo of Elizabeth Warren at Boston Pride in 2017 outside the Boston Public Library.
- Status: Active
- Genre: Pride parade
- Frequency: Annually
- Locations: Boston, Massachusetts, U.S.
- Inaugurated: June 1970

Boston Pride is an annual LGBTQ pride event held in Boston, Massachusetts. As of 2019 it was the 22nd largest pride event in the world and alleged by organizers to be the third-largest pride parade in the United States.

== History ==
=== 1970s ===
Boston Pride began in June 1970, when a small group of about 50 gay and lesbian activists marched from Cambridge Common to Boston Common, where they held a rally commemorating the Stonewall riots. On June 26, 1971, about 300 people attended the first official Boston Pride March, which stopped at four locations in the city: Jacque's (a drag bar), the Boston police headquarters, the Massachusetts State House, and St. Paul's Cathedral. At each location marchers read off their demands and grievances: misogyny, police harassment, legal discrimination, and religious persecution, respectively. After the march, a rally was held with a "closet-smashing" demonstration. In 1972, the march visited the city jail and returned to the State House.

In 1974 the Lavender Rhino debuted as a float in the parade. Earlier that year, Gay Media Action had put together a series of ads featuring the rhino as part of a campaign to encourage LGBTQ visibility. When they pitched the ads to the MBTA, however, they were told they could not run the ads at the public service price rather than the more expensive standard price. This led to a protest campaign, which then led to the Lavender Rhino float. Subsequently, the rhino became the parade's mascot.

In 1978 the event was renamed the New England Lesbian and Gay Pride Parade; about 5,000 people attended.

=== 1980s ===
1981 had an expected 10,000 marchers. By 1984 attendance increased to 15,000, to 20,000 in 1985, and to 25,000 in 1986.

In 1987 Boston Pride was able to raise a Lavender Rhino flag at City Hall. The 1988 parade marked the first time the event was organized formally by a pride committee, who required pre-registration for marchers.

=== 1990s ===
By 1993 Boston Pride was reporting an attendance of 100,000 people. The growing attendance led to some corporate groups marching in the parade by 1994.

In 1995 the Boston Dyke March was founded as an alternative to Boston Pride. Organizers alleged that Boston Pride had become too apolitical.

=== 2000s ===
Boston Pride in 2004 was particularly celebratory, as attendees celebrated the legalization of same-sex marriage in Massachusetts, which had been announced in November 2003, with marriage licenses being given out starting in May 2004.

=== 2010s ===
An estimated 25,000 people marched in the parade in 2014.

In 2015 a group of protesters interrupted the parade to demand that organizers pay attention to the issues faced by transgender people and LGBTQ people of color.

In 2017 the parade's theme was "Stronger Together" in remembrance of the victims of the 2016 Pulse nightclub shooting; 29 survivors of the attack led the parade.

2019 had an expected turnout of 50,000 marchers and 750,000 parade and festival attendees.

=== 2020s ===
Boston Pride was not held in-person in 2020 and 2021 due to the COVID-19 pandemic. In 2021, the organization known as Boston Pride dissolved after multiple years of internal disagreements. In 2022, a variety of pride events were held in Boston, although none were on the scale of Boston Pride.

In September 2022, a new organizing committee, Boston Pride for the People, was established.

The Boston Pride parade returned under the new committee in June 2023. Around 10,000 marchers registered to attend.

In 2024, amid the ongoing Gaza war, queer pro-Palestinian advocates blocked the parade until police arrested the counterprotesters.

A book, The Rise and Fall of Boston Pride: The Rise of a Movement, The Fall of an Organization by Daniel Joseph Gonzalez was released on June 1, 2025. This is the only book on the history of Boston Pride from 1970-2024.
