= Anne Fulton (activist) =

Canadian activist (1951–2015)

- Born: 25 July 1951; Woodstock, New Brunswick, Canada
- Died: 2 November 2015 (aged 64)
- Occupations: Counsellor; writer
- Known for: LGBT activism

Anne Fulton (25 July 1951 – 2 November 2015) was a Canadian activist in Nova Scotia, considered to be a founding mother of the LGBT community in Halifax. Fulton was among the founding members of the Gay Alliance for Equality, and was involved with many gatherings and demonstrations of LGBT activists in Halifax throughout the 1970s and 1980s. Fulton contributed to a number of publications in Canada such as The Voice, Lesbian Canada Lesbienne and The Sisters' Lightship.

== Biography ==
Anne Fulton was born on 25 July 1951 in Woodstock, New Brunswick to parents Robinson and Hazel Fulton. She earned a Bachelor of Arts, a Bachelor of Education, and a Master of Arts in counselling, and worked as a self-employed counsellor in Halifax, Nova Scotia.

In 1973, Fulton was a founding member of the Gay Alliance for Equality, which was the first gay and lesbian activist organization in Nova Scotia. She is thus considered to be a founding mother of the LGBT community in Halifax. Throughout the 1970s, Fulton was actively involved in many gatherings of LGBT activists in Halifax. She was notably present at the first gay demonstration held in Atlantic Canada, which was organized in opposition to the Canadian Broadcasting Corporation refusing to air a public service announcement concerning a help line for gay people known as GayLine, of which Fulton was one of the first volunteers.

As a writer, Fulton contributed to publications such as The Voice, as well as one-issue lesbian publications such as Lesbian Canada Lesbienne and The Sisters' Lightship.

Fulton died from a heart attack on 2 November 2015.

== Selected publications ==
- Fulton, Anne (April 1985). "Halifax fights lesbian purge". Rites for Lesbian and Gay Liberation. Toronto, ON: Rites Publishing. p. n4 – via Archive.org.

== See also ==
- Halifax Pride
- LGBT rights in Canada
