= Halifax Pride =

Annual LGBTQ pride festival in Halifax, Nova Scotia

- Official logo of Halifax Pride

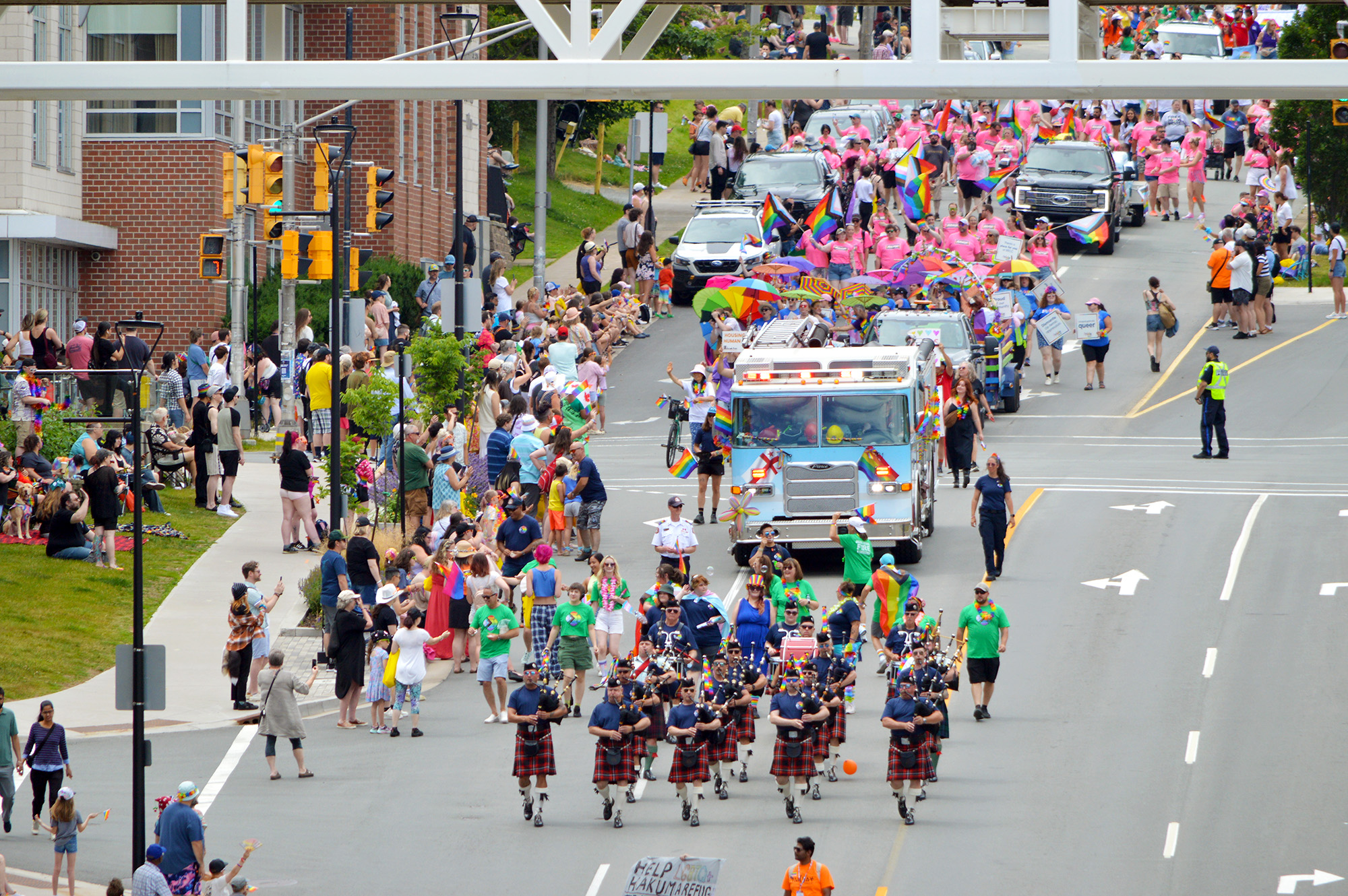
- Halifax Pride 2025
- Status: Active
- Genre: Pride festival
- Begins: July 17, 2025
- Ends: July 27, 2025
- Frequency: Annually, mid to late July
- Locations: Halifax, Nova Scotia
- Country: Canada
- Years active: 38
- Inaugurated: July 1, 1988
- Chair: Connor McKiggan
- Organiser: Halifax Pride Society
- Filing status: Not-for-Profit
- Website: Halifax Pride

Halifax Pride is a Canadian LGBTQ pride festival, held annually in Halifax, Nova Scotia. It is the largest 2SLGBTQ+ event in Atlantic Canada, and one of the largest 2SLGBTQ+ pride events in Canada.

First held in 1988, the inaugural event featured just 75 marchers, some of whom wore paper bags over their heads due to the stigma against being openly identified as LGBT. The 2014 event featured approximately 2,500 marchers, with 80,000 people in attendance as participants or spectators.

The event's grand marshal in 2014 was Scott Jones, an LGBT activist from New Glasgow who launched the Don't Be Afraid campaign of LGBT awareness after being left paraplegic by an anti-gay attack in 2013. The event also featured a commemoration of Raymond Taavel, a former chair of the event who was killed in a violent attack in 2012.

The 2014 parade route started on Upper Water Street, and followed Barrington Street, Spring Garden Road and South Park Street to the Garrison Grounds at Citadel Hill.

In 2011, co-chair Ed Savage created some controversy by describing the event as "less promiscuous" and more family-oriented than other Pride festivals across Canada.

The pride parade was not held in 2020 and 2021 due to the COVID-19 pandemic, but alternative online and in-person events were organized. The parade returned in 2022.

In September 2022, executive director Adam Reid, and operations and communications manager Fiona Kerr stepped down. Both had worked on the event since 2017. The 2023 event was surrounded with uncertainty, after a planned community meeting on July 3, 2023, was postponed. This left the community with no update regarding the event that was supposed to take place over the 20th – 23 July. The parade was postponed due to the 2023 Nova Scotia floods, and was never rescheduled. In October 2023, the board was overhauled with Adam Reid returning as chair and Fiona Kerr being rehired.

Halifax Pride has been announced as the host for Canada Pride 2027. On March 17, 2025, the first annual Atlantic Pride Pageant at Spatz Theatre was held as the kick-off for the 2027 festival with drag artist Penny Cillin winning the crown.

== See also ==
- Anne Fulton (activist)
- Gay Alliance for Equality
