= Queen City Pride =

Annual LGBT event in Regina, Saskatchewan

- Status: Active
- Genre: Pride festival
- Location: Regina, Saskatchewan
- Years active: 36
- Inaugurated: 1990
- Organiser: Regina Pride Inc.
- Website: queencitypride.ca

Queen City Pride is an LGBT pride festival, held annually in Regina, Saskatchewan, Canada. The event is held mid-June each year, normally in the week following Saskatoon Pride. The festival is administered by Regina Pride Inc., a non-profit corporation in the province of Saskatchewan.

The event kicks off with a raising of the rainbow flag at the Regina City Hall on the Monday of Pride Week, and concludes with a parade and community fair on the Saturday. An estimated 3-4,000 people attend the event each year.

== History ==
The event was first held on June 23, 1990, though other pride marches and rallies were held in Regina during the 1970s and 1980s. The police chief refused to sign off on the event, so the march went ahead illegally. Somewhere between 50 and 90 people attended the original event, with some covering their faces out of fear of their identities being known.

The 2014 event marked the first time in the city's history that the incumbent mayor, Michael Fougere, presided over the raising of the rainbow flag to kick off the event. Nearly 2,000 people attended the event in 2017. In 2019, the event's 30th anniversary, the theme was "Growing from Many Voices".

The event was canceled in 2020 due to the COVID-19 pandemic. The event went forward in a limited capacity in 2021, and fully returned in person in 2022, with the theme "Together Again". In 2024, Queen City Pride cancelled the flag raising and banned members of the Saskatchewan Party government from participating in the event, citing recent anti-LGBT policies such as the Parents' Bill of Rights. The organization stated that "we do not believe it would be appropriate to allow them to take part in such an important event for our community."
