= Tri-Pride =

Annual pride festival

- Location: Waterloo Region, Ontario
- Type: Pride festival
- Organised by: Tri-Pride Community Association
- Website: tri-pride.ca

Tri-Pride, stylized tri-Pride, is an annual non-profit lesbian, gay, bisexual, transgender and queer Pride festival in the Waterloo Region of Ontario, encompassing the cities of Cambridge, Kitchener and Waterloo. Prior to the launch of Guelph Pride in 2003, the event also included the city of Guelph.

tri-Pride is considered Canada's largest regional pride festival. The official name of the organization is tri-Pride Community Association Inc.

== History ==
This event was formed in 1995 and has grown ever since its inception.

The event was extended to a week in 2003, and its 3,000 visitors made it one of the largest pride events in southern Ontario after Toronto Pride.

The Waterloo Region Record, Labatt Brewing Company, and the local CTV affiliate CKCO-DT have been sponsors of the event.

The 2011 edition included a horse race at Grand River Raceway in Elora, Ontario which was claimed to be "harness racing’s first-ever Drag (Queen) Race".

In 2012 6,000 people attended the event.

Performers at the 2013 festival included Gabe Lopez, God Made Me Funky, Drake Jensen, Sarah Smith and The Ecstatic. The tri-Pride Live Music Festival headliners for 2014 were Thelma Houston and Canadian Idol winner Theo Tams.

The organization almost disbanded in 2016 due to a lack of volunteers.

In 2017 and 2019 the tri-Pride organization helped organize a Pride march in Kitchener.

During tri-Pride in 2018, rainbow crosswalks were unveiled in Kitchener and Waterloo. Kitchener's crosswalk was paid for by the city.

tri-Pride did not occur in 2020 or 2021 due to the COVID-19 pandemic. The event returned in June 2022.

== Events ==
The event has often run from late May to early June.

The festival's programming has at times started with raising the Pride flag at one of the city halls.

A diverse range of events are held in all three cities, including musical, comedy, and drag performances. 2017's tri-Pride also saw crafting nights, pageants, support groups, and yoga. tri-Pride's two-week-long program of events usually culminates in a weekend concert in Kitchener's Civic Square or Kitchener's Victoria Park.
