= Las Vegas Pride Festival =

Annual pride parade in Nevada, U.S.

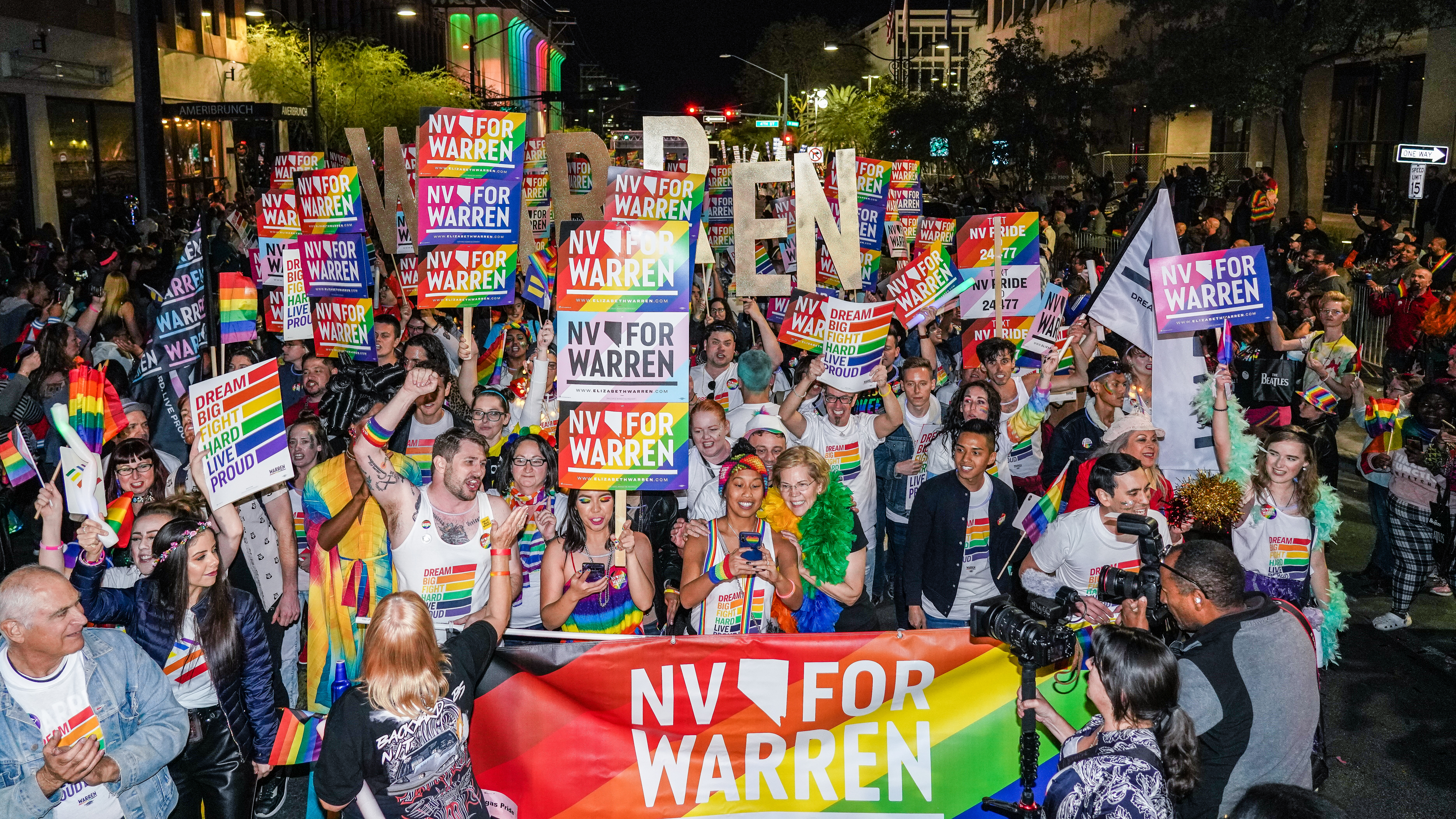

The Las Vegas Pride Festival (often stylized Las Vegas PRIDE Festival) is an annual pride parade and associated festival in Las Vegas, Nevada produced by the Southern Nevada Association of Pride.

The festival is held each October at Sunset Park. Prior year events were held in May and June, but the timing was changed to reduce the impact of seasonal heat. The Southern Nevada Association of PRIDE also hosts and participates in other related events every year, as part of the wider Las Vegas Pride Festival, including pool parties, bingo, hikes and lectures.

== History ==
The first festival was held in 1983 and is estimated to have attracted 200 people.

The 2017 festival, which attracted more than 25,000 participants, commemorated the 58 victims of the Las Vegas mass shooting. The 2018 parade was the 35th annual festival and the 20th annual night parade.

== Controversy ==
At the 2017 festival, Chipotle Mexican Grill handed out coupons that read "¿Homo estás?", which was interpreted by some as a slur at the LGBTQ community.

== See also ==
- LGBT rights in Nevada
