= Raymond Taavel =

Canadian LGBTQ+ activist and murder victim

- Born: 9 June 1962
- Died: April 17, 2012 (aged 49); Halifax, Nova Scotia, Canada
- Cause of death: Murder
- Known for: LGBT activism
- Awards: Queen Elizabeth II Diamond Jubilee medal

Raymond Taavel (June 9, 1962 – April 17, 2012) was a Canadian LGBTQ rights activist who was attacked and killed by Andre Noel Denny on April 17, 2012 outside Menz Bar, Gottingen Street while protecting another person. He was thereafter posthumously awarded the Queen Elizabeth II Diamond Jubilee medal. He played a key role in the Halifax Regional Municipality (HRM)’s first ever Pride Week publication. He worked toward having the rainbow flag raised at Halifax City Hall. During his lifetime he also engaged in endeavors to legitimize equal marriage and transgender rights in Nova Scotia’s Human Rights Act. In 2017, the Department of Heritage and Culture Committee of the Halifax Regional Council selected Taavel as one of 30 Nova Scotians from the last century-and-a-half to be celebrated in the Vanguard exhibition at the Nova Scotia Museum for his “innovation and change in the face of diversity.” In 2019 Inglis Street Park was renamed the Raymond Taavel Park in his honor.
