= OutWords =

Canadian magazine

OutWords was a Canadian magazine, published in Winnipeg, Manitoba for the city's lesbian, gay, bisexual and transgender communities. Launched in November 1994 as Swerve by a collective that included Carol Philipps, Stephen Lawson, Ian King, David McGunigal, Rob Shaw, Szu Burgess and Noreen Stevens, it published as funds were available until finally achieving a monthly circulation two years later.

The name Swerve was chosen as a portmanteau of swish and nerve.

A tabloid newsmagazine, it was distributed free of charge mostly in Winnipeg, with several points outside of Manitoba and in the northern United States. Swerve incorporated as a non-profit organization in June 2000, adopting a set of bylaws and electing a board of directors. The day-to-day operations are overseen by an editorial team who are paid a small honorarium for their work. The former executive director of Canada's national LGBT lobby group Egale, Gilles Marchildon, worked at Swerve for over four years and served as editor for three years.

In 2005, the magazine became involved in a trademark dispute, when the Calgary Herald co-opted the name Swerve for a weekly entertainment supplement. Shortly after, the magazine was transformed from a tabloid into a book format under the guidance of its editor since 2001, Richard F.J. Wood. It also revised its mission statement and its tagline, which changed from "Winnipeg's monthly queer newsmagazine" to "One Community > Diverse Lives."

Wood left as editor in April 2006. The trade-mark dispute was settled in August 2006. In January 2007, the magazine re-launched under the name OutWords with the tagline "Getting the word out since 1994."

In May 2016, the final print edition of OutWords was published and it became a digital-only publication.
