= Guelph Pride =

Annual LGBT event in Guelph, Ontario

- The official logo of Guelph Pride
- Type: Pride festival
- Legal status: Active
- Headquarters: Guelph, Ontario, Canada
- Region served: Guelph
- Chair of the Committee: Martin Straathof
- Website: www.guelphpride.com

Guelph Pride is an LGBT pride festival, held annually in Guelph, Ontario, Canada.

Organized by the Guelph Pride Committee with the assistance of Out on the Shelf, the city's local LGBT library and resource centre, the event takes place in May each year. The event generally takes place as the first Pride celebration in the Southern Ontario region each summer.

Held for the first time in 2003, the event celebrated its 10th anniversary in 2013. Prior to the launch of its own Pride festival, Guelph held events as part of Waterloo Region's tri-Pride. tri-Pride and its former name Waterloo-Wellington Regional Pride Committee with a number of community partners assisted with the transition to create Guelph's own pride festival committee In 2013, the organization also launched Winter Pride, a smaller separate program of events which takes place in February.

The organization is well-supported by community leaders. Former mayor Karen Farbridge has officiated the official raising of the rainbow flag to kick off the event, and Liz Sandals, the city's provincial MPP, has also attended events and supported the organization.

The organization also works to help build and develop LGBT resources throughout Southwestern Ontario; in 2011, they donated several hundred books to the Thames Art Gallery in Chatham to help build a local LGBT library and archive.

Unlike many larger pride festivals, Guelph Pride does not currently hold a parade, instead focusing on a more modest program of family and community events. Its weeklong program of events currently culminates in an afternoon family fair at the city's West End Community Centre on the final weekend, followed by a pride dance in the evening.
