= Calgary Society of Independent Filmmakers =

Canadian non-profit film organization

The Calgary Society of Independent Filmmakers (CSIF) is a non-profit organization based in Calgary, Alberta, Canada. In 1978, twelve local filmmakers and artists collaborated to form the society in response to a growing interest in film production and need for equipment and resources.

== 25th anniversary ==
In 2003, the Society celebrated its 25th anniversary. Many local filmmakers got their start in the 70s and 80s taking classes and are now working in the industry including producers Wendy Hill-Tout, Gary Burns and directors Mike Dowse, Robert Cuffley and David Winning.
