= Pink Triangle Press =

Canadian media company

- Industry: Newspaper
- Founded: October 1971
- Headquarters: Toronto, Ontario
- Key people: David Walberg (executive director)
- Products: Newspapers, Website, Television
- Subsidiaries: Xtra!, Squirt.org, GuySpy
- Website: pinktrianglepress.com

Pink Triangle Press is an independent, Canadian media organization specializing in LGBTQ2S+ journalism, television and online interactive media. Founded in 1971, Pink Triangle Press is one of the longest-publishing LGBTQ2S+ media groups in the world. Today, Pink Triangle Press publishes Xtra, an online magazine and community platform covering LGBTQ2S+ culture, politics and health. Pink Triangle Press also publishes a series of newsletters including Pink Ticket Travel and Wander+Lust. Pink Ticket Travel is a Queer travel newsletter featuring travel tips and guidelines for LGBTQ2S+ travelers. Wander+Lust is a newsletter featuring travel tips and tricks for gay and bi men, including insider recommendations and exclusive offers.

== History ==
Pink Triangle Press' roots trace back to 1971 (although not in name) in Toronto, when a group of volunteers began to produce The Body Politic, a paper containing news and opinions on gay liberation. By 1976 TBP was being published monthly, and in the early 1980s it claimed a circulation of over 9,000 nationally, and boasted contributions from writers all over the world.

In 1978, Pink Triangle Press was incorporated, its name was chosen as a symbol of history and commitment, as it comes from the symbols placed on suspected homosexual men in Nazi concentration camps. Later that year, PTP was charged with "publishing immoral, indecent and scurrilous material" because of an issue of The Body Politic which included Gerald Hannon's article "Men Loving Boys Loving Men". The Press was brought up on similar charges again in May 1982, this time for "Lust With a Very Proper Stranger", an article on fisting. PTP however won both cases.

In an attempt to broaden PTP's Toronto readership, the collective launched Xtra! in March 1984. Xtra! was meant to be more upbeat and accessible than TBP. By 1985 Xtra! had taken over its parent publication's role of providing local entertainment and community event listings.

Xtra!'s circulation had soon overtaken TBP which was in financial trouble, so in an effort to save PTP and keep Xtra! going, TBP was discontinued in February 1987.

Xtra! West in Vancouver, later called Xtra Vancouver, and Capital Xtra! in Ottawa, later called Xtra Ottawa, were both launched in 1993.

In January 2015, the company announced that it was discontinuing publication of its print titles, with the final edition of Xtra! published on February 19. Xtra! will continue as a digital media publication via the Daily Xtra website.

== Other investments ==
Pink Triangle Press launched Squirt.org in 1998, a Canadian-based cruising website for gay men. The website includes user-generated listings for parks, saunas and popular gay public sex locations.

In December 2023, Pink Triangle Press announced their partnership with the Canada Media Fund to advocate for LGBTQ2S+ professionals working in Canadian film, television, gaming and streaming industries. This includes the composition of a series of Pink Papers, which will be centered upon LGBTQ2S+ representation.

In July 2004, Pink Triangle Press became a minority partner in PrideVision TV when the channel was sold by Headline Media Group to William Craig. PrideVision was subsequently rebranded OutTV and a new gay male adult subscription channel, HARDtv, was launched at the same time. PTP sold its interest in OutTV to majority partner Shavick Entertainment in December 2012.

Previous to PrideVision being sold, Pink Triangle Press became partners with television producer Les Tomlin, forming Bumper 2 Bumper Media Inc. which produces Bump!, the world's first gay travel show, initially airing on PrideVision and now in production on a fifth season. Bump also recently launched a series of mobile travel guide apps for iPhone, iPod Touch, iPad and Blackberry.

As well, Pink Triangle Press was a partner in Evanov Radio Group's license application for 103.9 PROUD FM, a new radio station to serve Toronto's LGBT community. PTP's agreement with Evanov was discontinued in late 2005 after PTP expressed reservations about the depth of Evanov's commitment to serving LGBT audiences.

Pink Triangle Press also operated a gay telephone personals service under the Cruiseline banner in all three cities where the Xtra! papers publish, as well as five other major Canadian centres across the country. UPDATE: March 2011, Pink Triangle Press sells Cruiseline to First Media Group.

In June 2006 Pink Triangle Press acquired Boston-based publication The Guide, an international gay travel magazine in existence for more than 25 years. PTP ceased printing The Guide in April 2010, and move to an online format only at Guidemag.com.

In February 2008 Pink Triangle Press acquired Toronto-based publication fab, a gay scene magazine which had previously been seen as Xtra!'s competition. On March 12, 2013, Pink Triangle Press announced that fab would be discontinued, with its final issue slated for publication on April 24.

In March 2017 Pink Triangle Press acquired the location based gay dating and social network app GuySpy. The terms of the deal were not disclosed. The acquisition was part of Pink Triangle Press' growth strategy to expand into an entirely new segment through the GuySpy social network and mobile app. They instructed their users to delete the app and re-download it, in order to keep using the GuySpy service.

In 2024 the company launched the PTP Pink Awards, a program to honour significant builders of LGBTQ community and culture in Canada.

== Subsidiaries ==
- Daily Xtra
- Index Directory - gay and lesbian business directory
- Ultimate Pride Guide - Pride festivities directory
- Squirt.org - online cruising website
- Xtensions
- Bumper 2 Bumper Media Inc.
- GuySpy

=== Defunct ===
- The Body Politic - 1971-87
- PinkType was a Canadian lesbian-feminist and gay male typesetting collective formed in October 1978, and which lasted until 1985. It was formed as an offshoot of Pink Triangle Press in order to help pay for the acquisition of new typesetting equipment. It offered professional typesetting services to other progressive publications, such as the Lesbian Organization of Toronto and Gay Fathers of Toronto. People involved include Merv Walker, Billy Sutherland, Gay Bell, Amy Gottlieb, Pam Godfrey, Carol Auld and John Allec.
- fab - 2008-13
- Xtra! - 1987-2015
- Xtra Vancouver - 1993-2015
- Xtra Ottawa - 1993-2015
