= Xtra Ottawa =

Canadian LGBTQ newspaper

- Format: Tabloid
- Owner: Pink Triangle Press
- Publisher: Brandon Matheson
- Editor: Matthew DiMera
- Founded: September 1993
- Ceased publication: February 12, 2015 (print)
- Language: English
- ISSN: 1195-6127
- OCLC number: 259372779
- Website: Xtra Ottawa

Xtra Ottawa (formerly Capital Xtra) was a lesbian, gay, bisexual and transgender community newspaper published in Ottawa, Ontario, Canada. It was launched in 1993. Unlike its biweekly sister publications Xtra in Toronto and Xtra Vancouver in Vancouver, Xtra Ottawa started as a monthly, and was later published 17 times a year, with a publication schedule of every three weeks. The Ottawa edition had a circulation of 20,000 copies which reached 36,000 readers.

Printed on newsprint in tabloid format from its establishment in 1993, Pink Triangle Press announced on January 14, 2015, that the paper edition would be discontinued and the publication would continue in an exclusively digital media format.

Xtra Ottawa also published a gay tourism map, Out in Ottawa, every spring; the Ultimate Pride Guide in mid-July; and the Index gay business directory in December.

== History ==
Xtra Ottawa was launched by Pink Triangle Press as Capital Xtra in 1993, shortly after the organization learned that Ottawa's existing LGBT publication, GO Info, had largely collapsed and was publishing irregularly with only a skeleton staff. Brandon Matheson, then a freelance journalist working in the Parliament Hill Press Gallery, was chosen to launch the project in conjunction with George Hartsgrove, then an administrator at the University of Ottawa. GO Info briefly tried to beef up its content in the face of its new competition, but folded in early 1994.

In 2007, Ottawa City Council attempted to pass restrictions on the paper's distribution in public facilities after a complaint was filed by Greg Evans.

In March 2010, Capital Xtra was renamed Xtra Ottawa with the launch of a redesign of the Xtra papers in the Toronto, Ottawa and Vancouver markets.

The paper's final print edition was published on February 12, 2015.

== Notable contributors ==
Early contributors to the magazine included Irshad Manji, and Alex Munter.

Other contributors included Blaine Marchand and Ariel Troster..

== See also ==
- List of newspapers in Canada
