= Calgary Pride =

Annual LGBT event in Calgary, Alberta

- The official logo of Calgary Pride
- Type: pride festival
- Legal status: active
- Purpose: To help see a city free from discrimination against gender identity, expression, and sexual orientation.
- Headquarters: Calgary
- Region served: Calgary
- Website: Calgary Pride

Calgary Pride is an LGBT pride festival, held annually in Calgary, Alberta, Canada. The event is organized by Pride Calgary, a non-profit organization, and is currently held in the final week of August, with the closing parade falling on the first weekend of September when necessary, each year.

The event was first held in 1990 and was marked by marchers wearing paper bags over their heads, both out of fear of being identified and as a protest against the stigma that keeps LGBT people in the closet. The event was officially recognized by the city in 1991, with the first official proclamation of Pride Week by then-mayor Al Duerr. A separate dyke march was added for the first time in 2010.

The event has often drawn national news coverage for its ability to attract support from influential political figures. In 2001, Joe Clark was the event's grand marshal, becoming the first former Prime Minister of Canada ever to attend a Pride parade in that capacity. In 2011, Calgary mayor Naheed Nenshi became the first mayor in the city's history to attend the parade as grand marshal, and in 2012 Alison Redford became the first Premier of Alberta to attend the event. The 2011 event was also noted as the first time that the Calgary Flames, the city's NHL franchise, sponsored a float in the parade.

== History ==
=== 1980-1993 ===
==== Calgary's First March ====
One of the earliest confrontations between City Hall and the gay community happened in 1980 where the Gay Information & Resources Calgary (GIRC) hosted a national gay rights conference at the University of Calgary. These conferences, during the 1970s and 80s, moved around the country as the gay rights movement began to pick up speed, with Calgary’s conference being the 8th annual event. At each conference, the organizers would stage a human rights parade; however, City of Calgary Police Chief Brian Sawyer refused the permit for the parade citing that “confrontation was a possibility”. On June 28, 1980, organizers decided to march anyway with forty of the conference delegates marching for half an hour, ending at City Hall with their signs of protest.

==== Pride Festival ====
Delegates from many of Calgary’s gay and lesbian organizations come together to form an umbrella organization called Project Pride Calgary. In 1988, Inspired by the Stonewall Riots, they produced a Pride festival to celebrate community which includes a concert, workshops, a dance, and a family picnic – but no public rally or protest.

In 1990 the Calgary Lesbian and Gay Political Action Guild (CLAGPAG), one of the Project Pride partners, organizes the first political rally, which they internally described as a media stunt. 140 people collected at the Old Y to pick up lone ranger masks, and then gather at the Boer War Statue in Central Memorial Park.

==== First Pride Parade ====
On Father's day June 16, 1991, the first Pride parade took place. The parade was hosted by CLAGPAG and over 400 people muster at City Hall cheered on gay Member of Parliament Svend Robinson, who gives an inspiring speech despite gloomy weather and even gloomier protesters, three of whom were arrested. During this time Mayor Al Duerr famously proclaimed gay pride week in Calgary but then denied future proclamations due to public pressure.

==== Pride Week ====
Calgary’s first “Pride Week” started as a weekend of workshops in 1988. In 1990, Calgary’s 3rd Annual “Pride Festival” had a political rally that drew 400 at Memorial Park. Consequently the first parade in 1991, was actually part of the 4th Annual Pride Festival.

Following this blunder made by Mayor Duerr, in 1992, the Gay and Lesbian community proclaimed “Gay and Lesbian Pride Week” themselves, taking ads out in public newspapers without any mayoral or civic endorsement.

=== 2005-present ===
==== Same-sex Marriage Legalization ====
In 2005 same-sex marriage becomes legal in Canada. The Alberta Government remains officially opposed and threatens to invoke the notwithstanding clause to negate the law in Alberta, but has not done so.

==== Calgary Pride Organization ====
In 2009 Pride Calgary moves the parade from June to the September long weekend, and transitions from a grassroots collective to an incorporated non-profit society.

==== Mayoral Approval ====
In 2011 Mayor Naheed Nenshi becomes the first Calgary mayor to march in our Pride Parade, and is parade marshal that year, making national headlines.

==== Rainbow Crosswalk ====
In 2015 the city's first rainbow crosswalk was painted in preparation for their 25th Annual Calgary Pride Festival, located in front of City Hall, on Macleod Trail and 8th Avenue.

==== Move to Prince's Island Park ====
In 2017, as many festivals began downgrading the Calgary Pride Festival outgrew its former home at Shaw Millennium Park, and now takes place in Prince’s Island Park in the heart of downtown Calgary.

==== Police Involvement ====
Calgary Pride releases a statement in 2017 regarding Calgary Police Service's involvement in Pride Week. As an organization, Calgary Pride does not believe in banning Calgary Police Services, and other law enforcement agencies from participating in Calgary’s Pride activities. They believe that this deters from "engaging in meaningful discussions on how law enforcement agencies can best support Calgary’s gender and sexually diverse (GSD) community."

During a meeting that took place before the 2017 Pride Week, collaboratively, all stakeholders reached a joint decision that, while there would be no official CPS entry in the parade, CPS members were invited to participate out of formal uniform, while still identifying as members of CPS, with any community organizations in the parade with which they have an affinity, in solidarity with the GSD community.
