= Pride Winnipeg =

Annual LGBT event in Winnipeg, Manitoba

Pride Winnipeg Festival
- Status: Active
- Genre: Festival
- Date: May 26 - June 4, 2023
- Frequency: Annually
- Locations: Winnipeg, Manitoba
- Country: Canada
- Years active: 27
- Inaugurated: 1987
- Most recent: May 27 - June 5, 2022
- Attendance: 50,000
- Website: www.pridewinnipeg.com

Pride Winnipeg Festival is a 10-day LGBT pride festival, held annually in Winnipeg, Manitoba, Canada. It is one of the largest organized pride festivals in central Canada, featuring 10-days of community-organized events, a Dyke March, a rally, Pride Parade, outdoor festival and closing party.

The Pride Winnipeg Festival is organized by Pride Winnipeg, a non-profit, volunteer organization. Pride Winnipeg currently consists of a president, vice-presidents, directors, coordinators, and managers. The current president is Barry Karlenzig.

== History ==
On August 2, 1987, approximately 250 people gathered at the Manitoba Legislative Building to await the results of the provincial government's decision to include sexual orientation in the Manitoba Human Rights Code. The consensus was that if the government voted in favor of including sexual orientation in the code they would march in celebration, if the government voted against including sexual orientation in the code they would march in protest.

The provincial government voted in favor of adding sexual orientation to the Manitoba Human Rights Code, which sparked the first 'Pride Parade' in Winnipeg as the 250 people marched in the streets of downtown Winnipeg in celebration.

Over the years the festival has grown in size but despite the advancements of LGBT rights the event has battled mayors, most notably Susan Thompson, who refused to recognize the event with civic proclamations.

A theme is selected for each Pride Winnipeg Festival that reflects current events and contexts of the LGBT community and helps shape festivities. Previous themes included "Proud to Be" (2010), "Unity" (2011), "Pride 25" (2012), "equALL" (2013), "withOUT Borders" (2014) "EVOLution" (2015), "Be Authentic" (2016), "Resurgence: Taking Back Space” (2017), "My First Pride" (2018), and "Pride of Colour" (2019).

=== Pride 25 ===
In 2012, the Pride Winnipeg Festival celebrated its 25th anniversary. The Festival took place from May 25 - June 3 and was the largest LGBT celebration the city had seen at that time. The festival featured a record number of community events and received overwhelming support from both citizens and businesses.

==== Lighting of the Legislative Building ====
As part of the 25th anniversary celebrations, Pride Winnipeg worked with the provincial government to light the six columns of the Manitoba Legislative Building in each of the colors of the rainbow flag (red, orange, yellow, green, blue, and purple). On June 1, 2012, a small ceremony took place on the steps of the Manitoba Legislative Building to commemorate the event. The Manitoba Legislative Building was successfully lit in rainbow colors at dusk with the 'Pride 25' theme logo being projected onto the dome. In doing so, pictures of the building went viral on a global scale.

=== equALL ===
The 2013 parade began with a rally on the grounds of the Legislative Assembly of Manitoba, followed by a parade along York and Broadway Avenues. Following the end of the parade, a community festival was held at The Forks, featuring performers including Vita Chambers, Kristina Maria and Ultra Naté. The parade was also marked by the presence of the I'm Sorry campaign, a group of Christians working to heal the legacy of homophobia between Christian churches and the LGBT community.

== Events ==
=== Rainbow flag raising ===
The Pride Winnipeg Festival normally commences with the raising of a rainbow flag at City Hall on the first Friday of the festival. The flag is typically risen by either the mayor or a city councillor, president of Pride Winnipeg, and a special guest.

=== Community events ===
After the rainbow flag raising various community events are held throughout the city. These events are not organized by Pride Winnipeg but are recognized as official pride festival events. Certain events have become synonymous with the Pride Winnipeg Festival such as the Pitch for Pride baseball tournament, the Pride Coffee House, Lesbian Lube Wrestling, Rainbow Resource Centre BBQ, and the Dyke March.

=== Pride Festival at The Forks ===
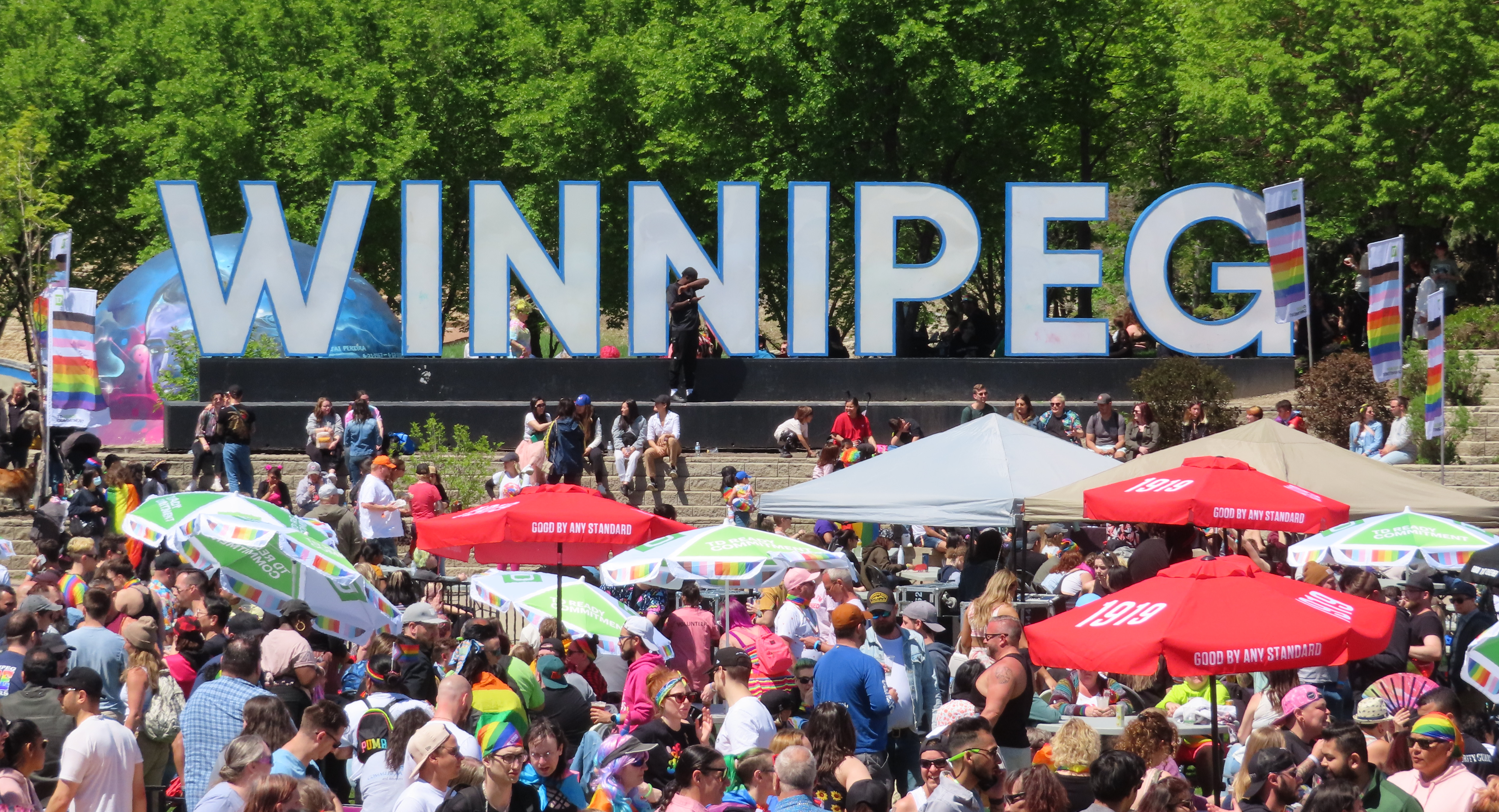
2022 festival

The Pride Festival at The Forks begins on the last Saturday of the celebrations and runs on the following Sunday (Pride Day). The Pride Festival at The Forks occurs on the adjacent lawns of the Canadian Museum for Human Rights and consists of an array of on-stage entertainment, artisans, vendors, entertainment for youth, and the Queer Beer tent. This event draws the largest crowd during the Pride Winnipeg Festival with attendance peaking on Pride Day after the Pride parade.

=== Pride Rally ===
The Pride Rally is an annual tradition in honor of the 250 people who first gathered at the Manitoba Legislative Building in 1987. It occurs in the late morning of Pride Day at the Manitoba Legislative Building and usually includes motivational speeches from a representative of each level of government and special guests.

=== Pride Parade ===
The Pride Parade begins after the Pride Rally and makes its way through downtown Winnipeg. In 2014 the parade traveled north up Memorial Blvd, then East down York St, south onto Garry St, then west down Broadway Ave back to The Manitoba Legislative Building. The parade features a grand marshal, honorary youth marshal, and honorary community group marshal, all of which are nominated by the community.
