= Saskatoon Pride =

Annual LGBT event in Saskatoon, Saskatchewan

- Truck at Saskatoon Pride 2023
- Status: Active
- Genre: Pride festival
- Locations: Saskatoon, Saskatchewan
- Country: Canada
- Years active: 25
- Inaugurated: 2001
- Organiser: Saskatoon Diversity Network
- Website: www.saskatoonpride.ca

The Saskatoon Pride Festival, commonly shortened to Saskatoon Pride, is an LGBT pride festival held annually in Saskatoon, Saskatchewan, Canada. Organized by the Saskatoon Diversity Network, a non-profit organization incorporated in 2002, the event takes place in early June each year.

In its current form, Saskatoon Pride was first held in 2001. Community groups in the city had held their own pride-themed events prior to this date, but 2001 marked the first time they were coordinated into a conventional Pride festival with a parade.

The event kicks off with a raising of the rainbow flag at Saskatoon City Hall on the Monday of Pride Week, and concludes with a parade and community fair on the Saturday.

== History ==
The first LGBTQ+ event in Saskatoon was an unofficial Pride picnic held at Cranberry Flats on September 2, 1973, after the city council had rejected activist Bruce Garman's request for permission to hold an official Pride Week.

=== Metamorphosis ===
In 1978 the Saskatchewan Gay Coalition (SGC) hosted the first Metamorphosis, a four-day LGBTQ2S+ arts and culture festival held over Thanksgiving weekend. It began in October 9, with a march from the Gay Community Centre to the town hall on October 10, and culminated in a large Thanksgiving feast on October 12. The name was chosen to represent the growth of the gay community. Over time, Metamorphosis became notable for the high presence of lesbian activists and community leaders compared to other events. The festival would run annually until 1989.

In June 2026, Canada Post released a postage stamp honoring the Metamorphosis festival as part of a set of four stamps commemorating LGBTQ2S+ history in Canada.

=== Saskatoon Pride 2017 ===
Clark speaking at the raising of the rainbow flag at Saskatoon City Hall, 2017

Mayor Charlie Clark was named as the grand marshal of Saskatoon Pride in 2017, becoming the first mayor of Saskatoon to do so. One group, unhappy that a heterosexual white man had been chosen as the Pride marshal, organized a separate parade called the Treaty 6 Real Pride March. This march was part of official festival and listed as the Global Pride March in the program.

Clark would make a statement on CBC Radio's Saskatoon Morning, saying:

I understand the concern 'Does that make this about me?' or 'Am I trying to draw political attention to myself?' and that is absolutely not the intent. There's a line that you walk in a role like this where I'm not trying to take over and make this about me; I want to make it about the community.

— Charlie Clark

Co-chair of the Saskatoon Pride Festival, Danny Papadatos, said that the board of directors specifically asked Clark to be grand marshal so the LGBTQ2S+ community could see that civic leaders supported them.

=== Rainbow crosswalks ===
Crosswalk at 23rd Street and Third Avenue North on 7 June 2017

In 2017, a rainbow crosswalk that had been installed at the intersection of 23rd Street and Third Avenue North as part of the Pride Festival was defaced with black skidmarks two days after being painted. Volunteers repainted it the day after.

In 2021, a 71-year-old man was arrested for threatening a group of volunteers painting a rainbow crosswalk in Broadway Avenue in Saskatoon. The man shouted "homophobic and racist remarks" at the group and attempted to remove a barricade separating them from the street.

=== Saskatoon Pride 2026 ===
Around ten thousand people attended the Saskatoon Pride Festival in 2026. The Official Opposition of Saskatchewan marched at the Saskatoon Pride Parade to call for the 2023 Parents' Bill of Rights to be repealed.
