= Xtra Vancouver =

Defunct Canadian newspaper

- Type: Bi-weekly newspaper
- Format: Tabloid
- Owner: Pink Triangle Press
- Publisher: Brandon Matheson
- Editor: Robin Perelle
- Founded: July 1993
- Ceased publication: February 12, 2015
- City: Vancouver, British Columbia
- ISSN: 1198-0613
- Website: www.xtra.ca

Xtra Vancouver (ISSN 1198-0613), formerly Xtra! West, was a gay bi-weekly newspaper, published by Pink Triangle Press in Vancouver, British Columbia, Canada.

Printed on newsprint in tabloid format from its establishment in 1993, Pink Triangle Press announced on January 14, 2015, that the paper edition will be discontinued and the publication will continue in an exclusively digital media format.

Xtra! West was founded in July 1993. Focused on business services, by the middle of 1995, it overtook Angles, the longer lasting community magazine of the LGBT community, to become Vancouver's largest and most widely read publication targeting gay and lesbian community. The publication had a circulation of 20,000 copies reaching estimated 32,000 readers.

Its offices were located in the Davie Village neighbourhood, Vancouver's gay village. The publication's original editor and publisher was Daniel Gawthrop. He was succeeded as editor by Gareth Kirkby in 1996, and Kirkby was succeeded by Robin Perelle in 2005. In 2008, Brandon Matheson became publisher, succeeding Ken Hickling who was publisher from 1999.

In March 2010, Xtra! West was rebranded Xtra Vancouver with the launch of a redesign in the Toronto, Ottawa and Vancouver markets.

The publication's final print edition was published on February 12, 2015.

== See also ==
- Xtra Magazine, a continuation of Xtra!, Xtra Ottawa and Xtra Vancouver.
- List of newspapers in Canada
