= Xtra Magazine =

Canadian LGBT newspaper

- Type: Digital Publication
- Format: Online, former print
- Owner: Pink Triangle Press
- Editor-in-chief: Angela Mullins
- Managing editor: Tara-Michelle Ziniuk
- Founded: 1984
- Ceased publication: February 19, 2015 (print)
- Headquarters: Toronto, Ontario
- ISSN: 0829-3384
- Website: xtramagazine.com

Xtra Magazine (formerly Daily Xtra and Xtra!) is an LGBTQ-focused digital publication and former print newspaper published by Pink Triangle Press in Toronto, Ontario, Canada. The publication is a continuation of the company's former print titles Xtra!, Xtra Ottawa, and Xtra Vancouver, which were all discontinued in 2015.

== History ==
Xtra was founded in Toronto on February 19, 1984 (with a March cover date) by Pink Triangle Press, a not-for-profit organization. It was introduced as a four-page tabloid, as a way to broaden PTP's Toronto readership. Pink Triangle Press had previously published The Body Politic, which was discontinued in 1987. From 1990 to 2000, Xtra published a quarterly literary supplement, The Church-Wellesley Review, for work by LGBTQ2 fiction and poetry writers.

The company also launched a telephone dating personals service, Cruiseline, which later evolved into the contemporary web-based Squirt.org.

In 1993, Xtra expanded, adding Xtra! West in Vancouver and Capital Xtra! in Ottawa. The three Xtra papers also produced an annual Ultimate Pride Guide and an annual lesbian and gay business directory called Index. Xtra and Xtra! West were published biweekly, while Capital Xtra! was initially published as a monthly, with its publication frequency later expanding to every three weeks.

The Vancouver and Ottawa publications were renamed Xtra Vancouver and Xtra Ottawa in the late 2000s, while the Toronto edition retained the name Xtra.

In 2010, due to the changing business climate for print publications, PTP closed the Ottawa offices, with the Ottawa edition of the publication published out of the Toronto office thereafter.

The final print issues of Xtra Vancouver and Xtra Ottawa appeared on February 12, 2015, while the Toronto edition's final print issue was published on the newspaper's 31st anniversary, February 19, 2015. The publications continued online as a digital publication, initially under the name Daily Xtra before reverting to the Xtra Magazine name.

== Contributors ==
Past contributors to the publications have included Lily Alexandre, Sandra Alland, Richard Burnett, Brenda Cossman, James Dubro, Gerald Hannon, Matthew Hays, Greg Kearney, Todd Klinck, Greg Kramer, R. W. Gray, Raziel Reid, Irshad Manji, Alex Munter, Rachel Giese, Brian Francis, Peter Knegt, and Jeffrey Round.

== See also ==
- List of newspapers in Canada
