= Stonewall =

Stonewall or Stone wall may refer to:

- Stone wall, a kind of masonry construction
- Stonewalling, engaging in uncooperative or delaying tactics
- Stonewall riots, a 1969 turning point for the modern LGBTQ rights movement in Greenwich Village, New York City

== Places ==
- Stone Wall (Australia), an escarpment overlooking the Murchison River Gorge
- Stonewall, Manitoba, Canada

=== United States ===
- Stonewall, California, an 1870s mining camp in the Cuyamaca Mountains
- Stonewall, Georgia
- Stonewall, Louisiana
- Stonewall, Mississippi
- Stonewall, North Carolina
- Stonewall, Oklahoma
- Stonewall County, Texas
- Stonewall, Texas, in Gillespie County
- Stonewall, West Virginia

== Arts and entertainment ==
- Stonewall, a 1993 account of the Stonewall riots by Martin Duberman
- Stonewall (1995 film), about the riots
- Stonewall (2015 film), about the riots
- Stonewall (comics), a character in the Marvel universe
- Stonewall (opera), an opera commissioned by New York City Opera
- Stonewall Book Award, a set of three literary awards
- The Stonewall Chorale, an LGBT choir based in New York City, founded in 1979
- The Stonewall Operas, four mini-operas commissioned by New York University
- Stonewalling, a 2022 Chinese film edited by Liao Ching-sung

=== Games ===
- Stonewall: The Battle of Kernstown, a 1978 board wargame that simulates the First Battle of Kernstown
- Stonewall (solitaire)
- Stonewall Attack, a chess opening
  - Stonewall Variation, in the Dutch Defence chess opening

== Events ==
- Stonewall 50 – WorldPride NYC 2019, events marking the fiftieth anniversary of the riots

== Military ==
- CSS Stonewall, a French-built warship built for the Confederate States Navy
- Operation Stonewall, a World War II military operation
- Stonewall Brigade, an American Civil War Confederate unit
- USS Stonewall Jackson (SSBN-634), a ballistic missile submarine

== Organizations and landmarks ==
=== Australia ===
- Stonewall Resources, an Australian mining company

=== United Kingdom ===
- Stonewall (charity), British LGBTQ+ rights organisation, formed in 1989
- Stonewall F.C., a British gay football team

=== United States ===
- Stonewall (Rocky Mount, North Carolina), a NRHP-listed plantation house
- Stonewall Columbus (formerly Stonewall Union), LGBTQ organization in Columbus, Ohio founded in 1981
- Stonewall Democrats, a United States Democratic Party caucus
  - Stonewall Young Democrats, an affiliated youth-based organization
- Stonewall Inn, site of the 1969 Stonewall riots in Greenwich Village, Manhattan, New York City
  - Stonewall National Monument, a park and landmark adjacent to the inn
- Stonewall Jackson Hotel, a hotel in Staunton, Virginia originally named after General Thomas "Stonewall" Jackson. Renamed Hotel 24 South in 2020.
- Stonewall of Miami Beach, a mixed disco that hosted the 1974 Wild Side Story
- Stonewall National Museum and Archives, an LGBT museum and library in Fort Lauderdale, Florida not directly related to the inn or the riots
- Stonewall House, an LGBTQ supportive housing development in Brooklyn, NY

== People ==
- Erling Stonewall (died 1207), a 13th-century Norwegian pretender to the throne
- Stonewall Jackson (1824–1863), American Civil War Confederate general, Professor of Physics, Virginia Military Institute
- "Stonewall of the West", a refers to Irish-American C.S military commander Patrick Ronayne Cleburne
- Stonewall Jackson (musician) (1932–2021), country musician

== See also ==
- Stonewall Uprising (2010), a documentary film
- Before Stonewall, a 1984 documentary film
- After Stonewall, a 1999 documentary film
- Montreal's Stonewall, a 1990 police raid on Sex Garage
- Dry stone, a method of building without mortar
