= Reclaim Pride Coalition =

Anti-commercialization activists

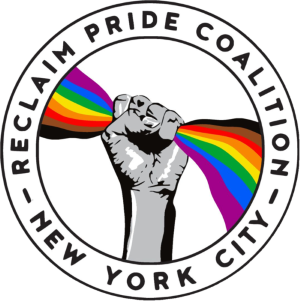
- Formation: 2019
- Type: Grassroots, political, LGBT
- Purpose: Protest against commercialized Pride events
- Website: reclaimpridenyc.org

Reclaim Pride Coalition is a coalition of LGBT groups and individuals that initially gathered in New York City in 2019 to create the Queer Liberation March in honor of the 50th Anniversary of the Stonewall riots and to protest the commercialization of LGBT Pride events. The following year, in solidarity with Black Lives Matter, the coalition organized the Queer Liberation March for Black Lives & Against Police Brutality.

== History ==
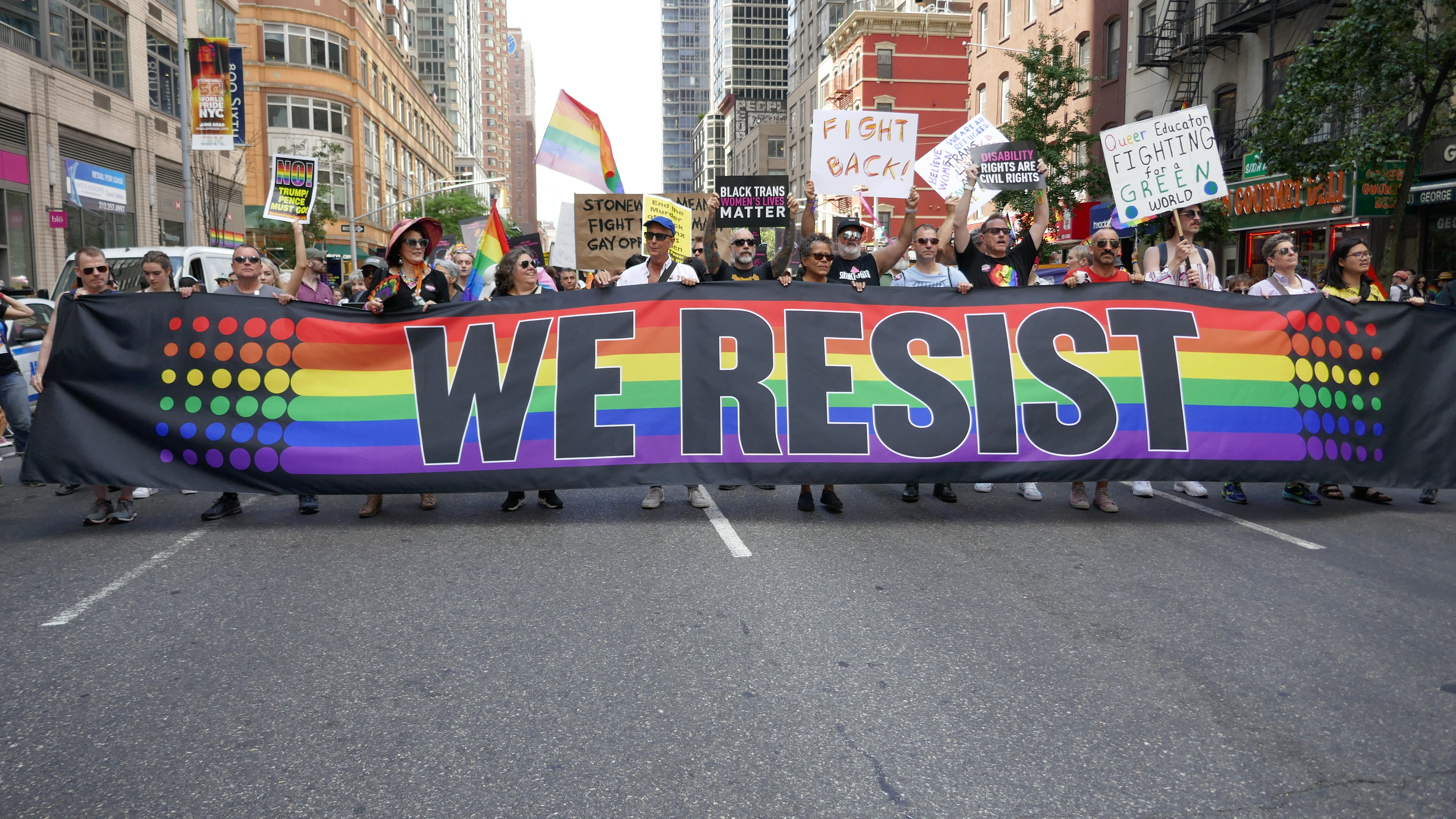
"We Resist" banner at the Queer Liberation March in New York City in 2019

The Reclaim Pride Coalition was created to gather members of the extended LGBT community, especially those most at its fringes – such as gender nonconforming individuals, queer youth of color, drag queens, sex workers, and radical lesbians – who seek to march in honor of the 50th Anniversary of the Stonewall riots that effectively started the gay rights movement in the United States in 1969. It planned the Queer Liberation March in New York City on June 30, 2019, from the Stonewall Inn, up Sixth Avenue, to Central Park for a rally on the Great Lawn.

The main concern of the coalition was to protest against a perceived lack of activism increasingly present in the corporate-sponsored floats and police-lined streets in the general celebratory NYC Pride March that is an annual tradition coordinated by organization Heritage of Pride. The Reclaim Pride Coalition believes that removing corporate sponsors and the police presence will better connect the march itself to the people, especially those who are believed to be excluded by the heavily sponsored, and much larger, World Pride parade.

The result was a second, activist-oriented pride march, the Queer Liberation March, which was held on the same day as the NYC Pride March to mark the 50th Anniversary of Stonewall. The Queer Liberation March encouraged anyone to march without prior registration.

== Reclaim Pride UK ==
The Reclaim Pride movement has also reached the LGBT community in the UK and is seeing strong support, especially in London, Manchester, Glasgow, and Brighton, where Reclaim Pride groups are visibly challenging organizers that run Pride money-making events, where many in the communities have no actual input to the events themselves. Their strong support of Stonewall riots and the belief that "Pride is Freedom, and Freedom is Free" motivates these coalitions.

In Scotland, the Unite trade union's LGBT committee blasted the charges imposed on organizations taking part in Glasgow's 2019 Pride event and took aim at big companies using the event merely to "enhance their customer reach". As such, they boycotted the event and encouraged other sections of the local gay community to do likewise. Describing Pride as a protest, Unite Scotland's LGBT committee wrote:

The Pride movement started as a riot 50 years ago this year at Stonewall Inn and as we remember this, we remember those we have lost and also celebrate the gains we have made. Yet, for some large commercial organizations, support for LGBT equality merely extends to paying a fee for a Pride March or temporary rainbow branding to enhance their customer reach. Once Pride season is over, there is no wider benefit to the LGBT community. We hear nothing about what is happening in our communities, about rising intolerance and hate crime, and the violence being perpetrated against LGBT+ citizens of our country. When people are abused and beaten for being themselves, the response from Pride is deafening in its silence. The politics has been driven from Pride by over-commercialisation and greed of those involved in making it ever more commercial for financial gain.'

Reclaim Pride in Brighton self describe as "An independent autonomous affinity group for radical pride actions, Queer Unity, Mutual Aid and protest movements", expressing Queer Anarchist politics in their 'Reclamation Zine' and have performed year-round anti-capitalist projects including a 'Free Store'. They have also hosted multiple demonstrations on LGBT issues such as perceived transphobia by the BBC. The group takes a Republican view of the British Monarchy

In September 2022, Reclaim Pride Brighton announced plans to protest an event organized by activist Kellie-Jay Keen-Minshull.

== See also ==
- Pink capitalism
- Homonationalism
- Pinkwashing
- Critical pride
- Night pride
- Gay shame
