= La Plexy =

Spanish drag artist

La Plexy, stage name of José de Benito, is a Spanish drag queen and multidisciplinary artist.

== Career ==
José de Benito began working as an actor in theater and advertising while studying a degree in dramatic arts at the Real Escuela Superior de Arte Dramático. Inspired by a comedy troupe, he founded the cabaret company Plexiglass. During its run, the company achieved significant success, winning the national cabaret award and achieving milestones such as collaborating on a music video by Alejandro Sanz and appearing on television programs alongside Jesús Vázquez. As the company began to dissolve, José started creating his drag persona, La Plexy, debuting as a drag queen at the nightclub Black & White.

In 2017, the magazine Shangay referred to her as a pride of national and international female impersonation, and she was honored at the Drag Gala HARPO AWARDS. In June 2018, she hosted the official event of the LGBT Pride of Madrid. At that point, she had already been performing as town crier for the event for over 15 years.

In June 2023, she once again served as town crier for the LGBT Pride of Madrid, in an event featuring the cast of the film Te estoy amando locamente and activist Manolita Chen. In 2024, she also served as presenter of the Drag Queen Gala in Torrevieja.

Outside of the drag art scene, José has worked as an actor, director, and theater teacher.

== Discography ==
=== Singles ===
Year	Title
2023	"Te Arrastro"
2023	"Distinta"
