= Stonewall Jackson (disambiguation) =

Stonewall Jackson (Thomas J. Jackson, 1824–1863) was a general in the Confederate States Army.

Stonewall Jackson may also refer to:

- Stonewall Jackson (singer) (1932–2021), American 1960s country music singer and musician
- John Jackson (footballer, born 1942), English footballer nicknamed "Stonewall"
- Stonewall Jackson (20th century general) (1891– 1943), American World War II major general
- Stonewall Jackson: The Good Soldier, a 1928 book by Allen Tate

== See also ==
- Stonewall (disambiguation)
