= Queer Liberation March =

Annual protest march in New York City since 2019

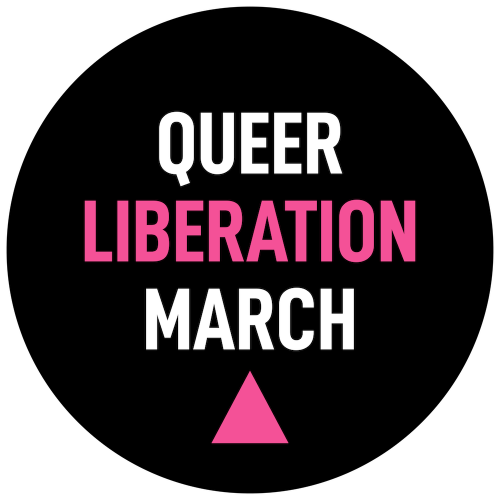

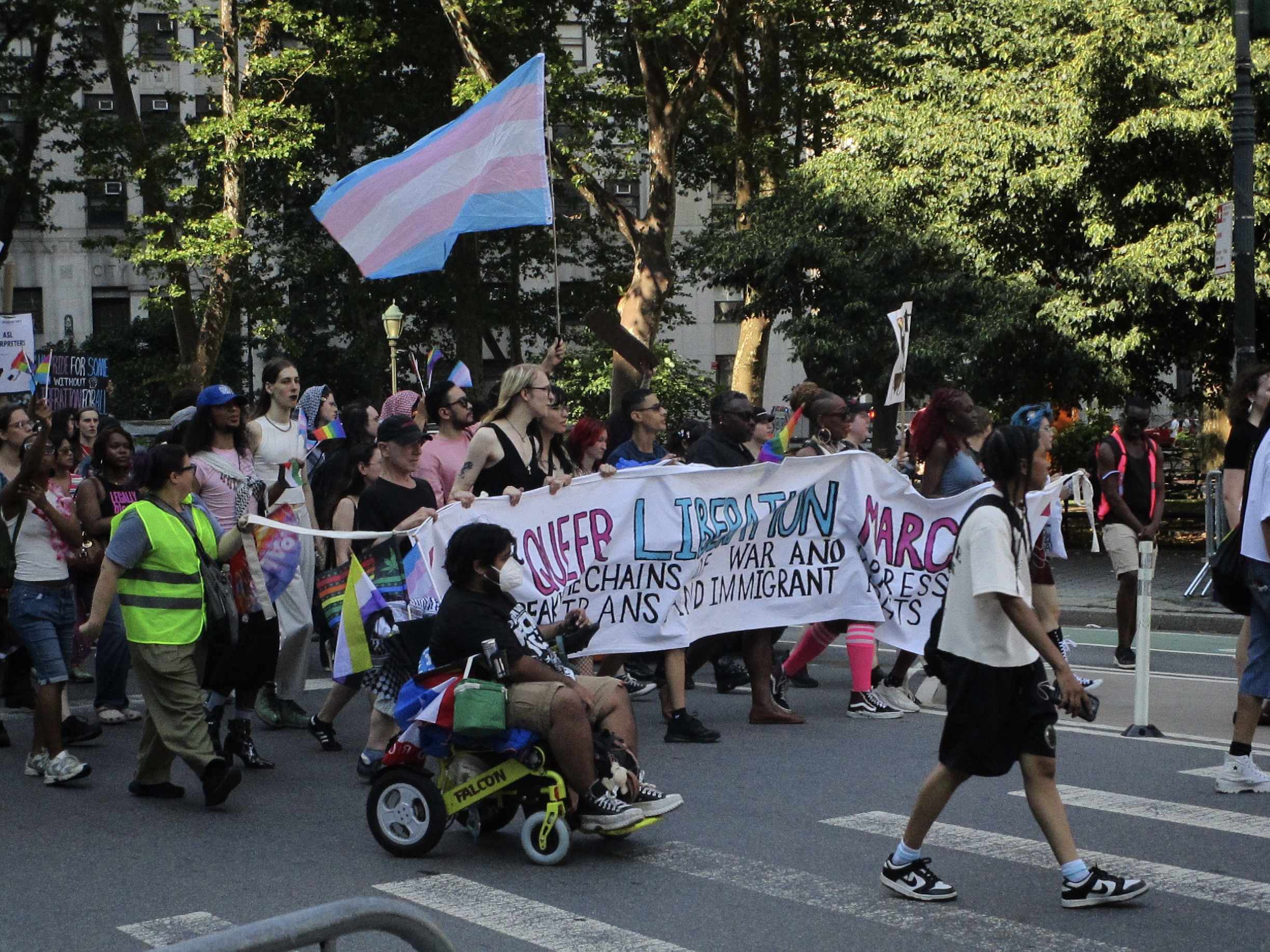
- 2026 Queer Liberation March
- Frequency: Annual
- Location: New York City
- Inaugurated: June 30, 2019
- Next event: June 28, 2026
- Organizer: Reclaim Pride Coalition
- Website: queermarch.org

The Queer Liberation March is an annual LGBTQ protest march in Manhattan, organized by the Reclaim Pride Coalition as an anti-corporate alternative to the NYC Pride March.

A grassroots collective of queer rights activists and supporters held the first Queer Liberation March to coincide with WorldPride NYC, which marked the 50th anniversary of the Stonewall riots. A year later the coalition marched in solidarity with Black Lives Matter, and against police brutality, only to see the non-violent demonstration met with NYPD using pepper spray on protesters.

== Background ==
There has been a large annual march and parade in New York City since 1970, first organized by the Christopher Street Liberation Day Committee, to mark the one-year anniversary of the Stonewall riots. Since 1984, the growing event was produced by the nonprofit Heritage of Pride. Criticism of the increasingly corporate and rules-heavy event reached a tipping point in 1994 (the 25th anniversary of the Stonewall riots), resulting in the first Drag March (1994).

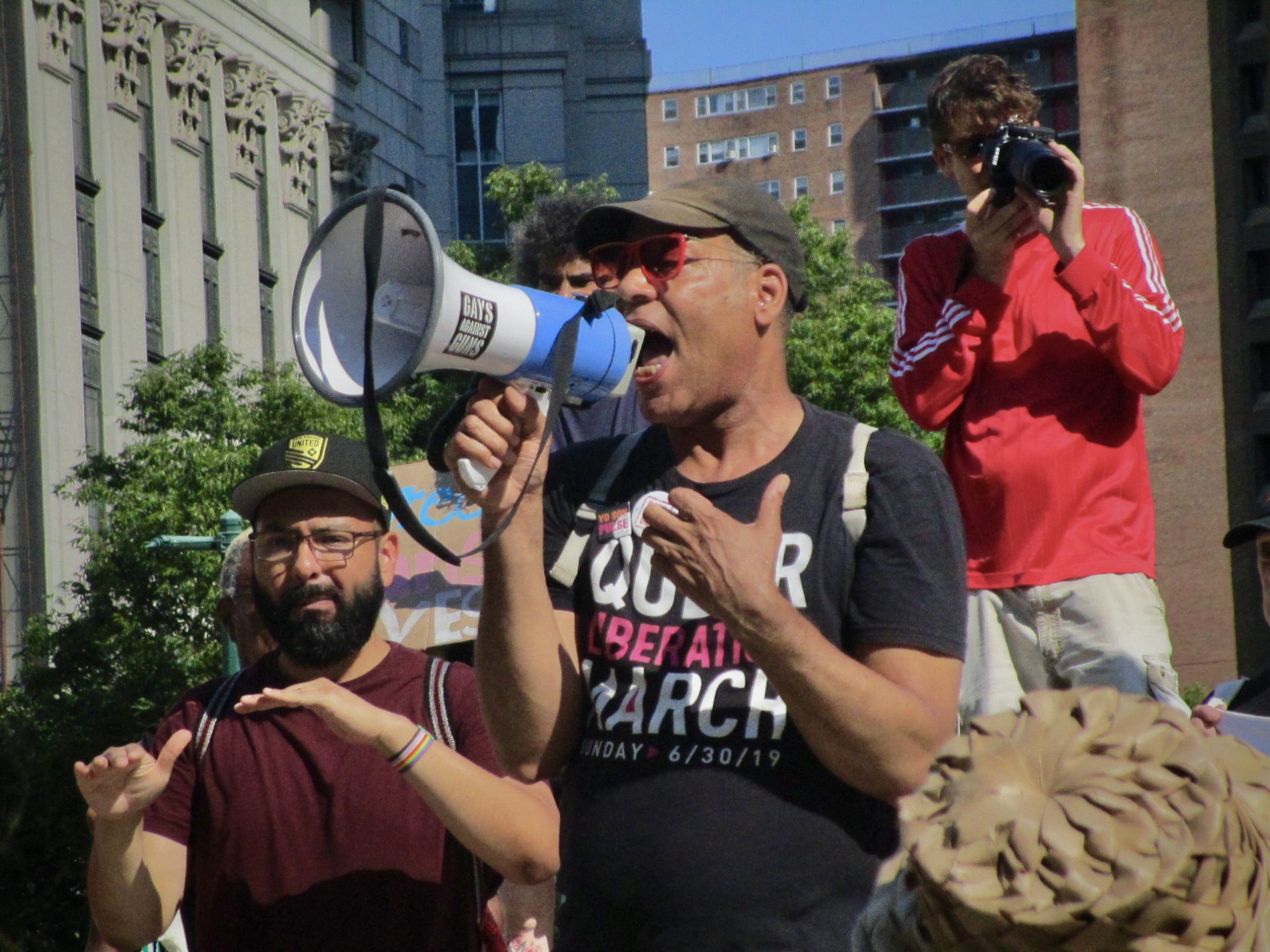
New York City activist Jay W. Walker speaks at the 2026 Queer Liberation March

The Queer Liberation March was organized in protest of the corporate-focused sponsorship and participation requirements of the larger march, resulting in dueling Manhattan LGBTQ marches on the same day in 2019. The Queer Liberation March proceeded uptown on Sixth Avenue in Manhattan, following the path of the original 1970 demonstration.

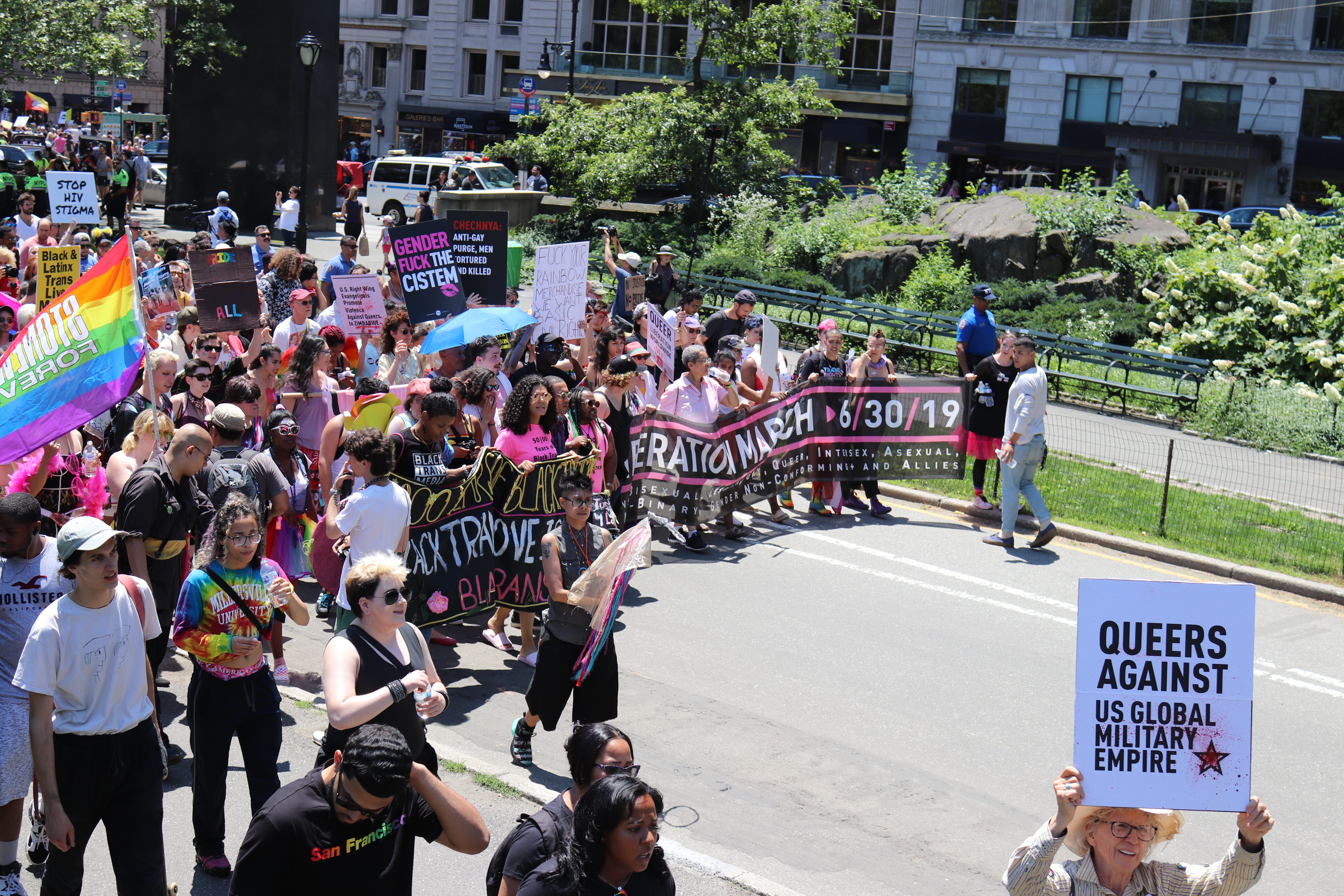
Protestors with banner on 6th Avenue, 2019; a pacifist sign reads "Queers Against U.S. Global Military Empire".

As a result of following the 1970 route, the first Queer Liberation March proceeded in the opposite direction of the New York City Pride March, which travels downtown on Fifth Avenue through most of its route.

== Organization ==
The Queer Liberation March was organized by the Reclaim Pride Coalition and was endorsed by activist and grassroots organizations including ACT UP NY, God's Love We Deliver, Housing Works, NYC Democratic Socialists of America, and SAGE. Civil rights attorney Norman Siegel worked with the City of New York for an agreement to hold the march on the same day as the larger NYC Pride March.

The march sought to embrace the activist intentions some believe have been lost in the larger, celebratory event.

== Participation ==
The 2019 march began with 8,000 participants at the Stonewall National Monument and grew to 45,000 people as others joined along the way.

Activist Qween Jean joined the organizational leadership in 2023.

=== Editions ===
Edition	Date	Theme!
1st	June 29, 2019	
2nd	June 28, 2020	March for Black Lives and Against Police Brutality
3rd	June 27, 2021	
4th	June 26, 2022	March for Trans and BIPOC Freedom, Reproductive Justice, and Bodily Autonomy
5th	June 25, 2023	Trans & Queer: Forever Here!
6th	June 30, 2024	March for Black, Brown, Queer, Trans, Gender Nonconforming, and Nonbinary Youth & Against War and Genocide
7th	June 29, 2025	Resist! Reclaim! Rejoice!
8th	June 28, 2026	Breaking the Chains of War and Oppression for Trans and Immigrant Rights

== Gallery ==
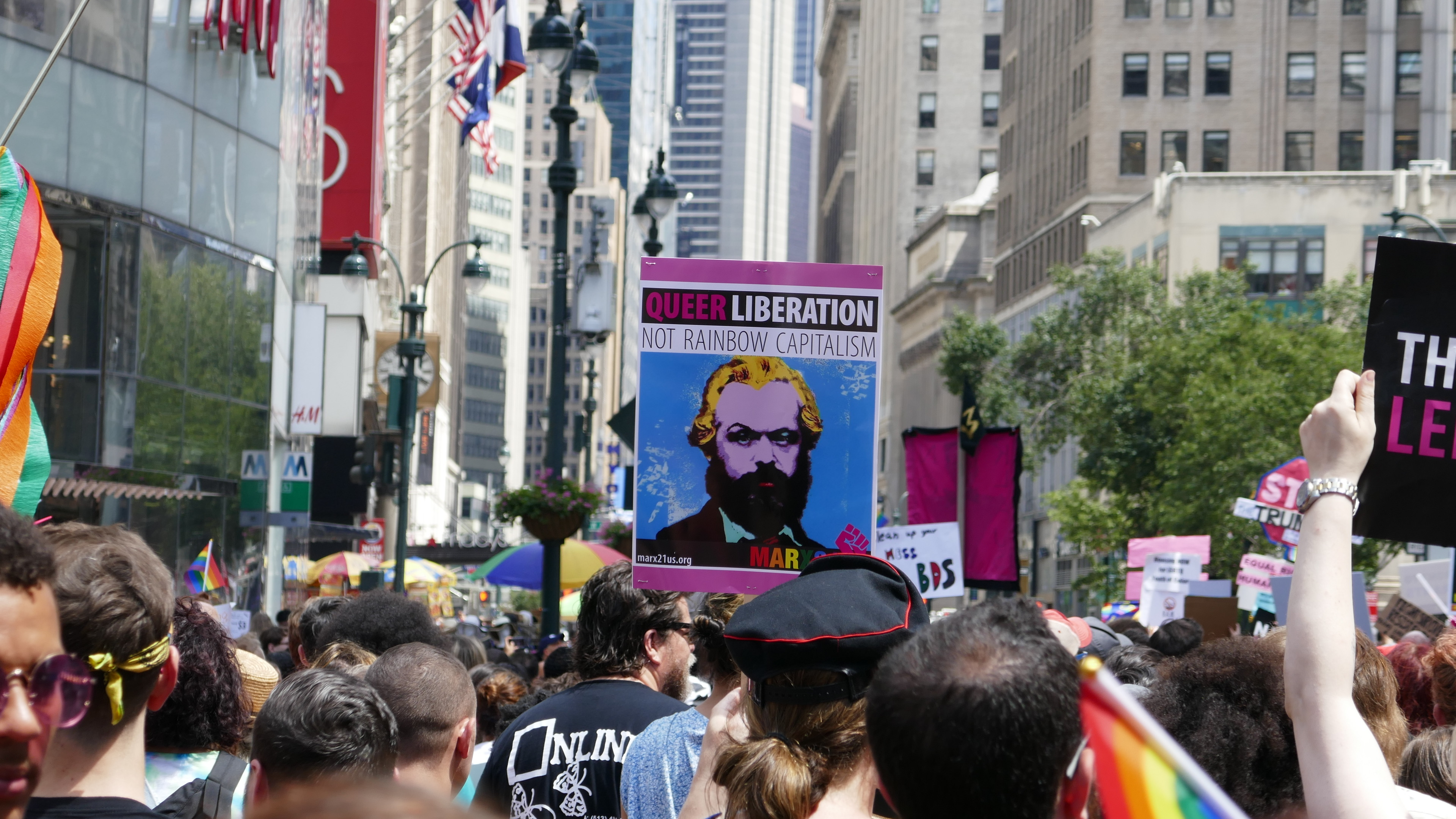
A Marxist sign reading "Queer Liberation, Not Rainbow Capitalism" in 2019

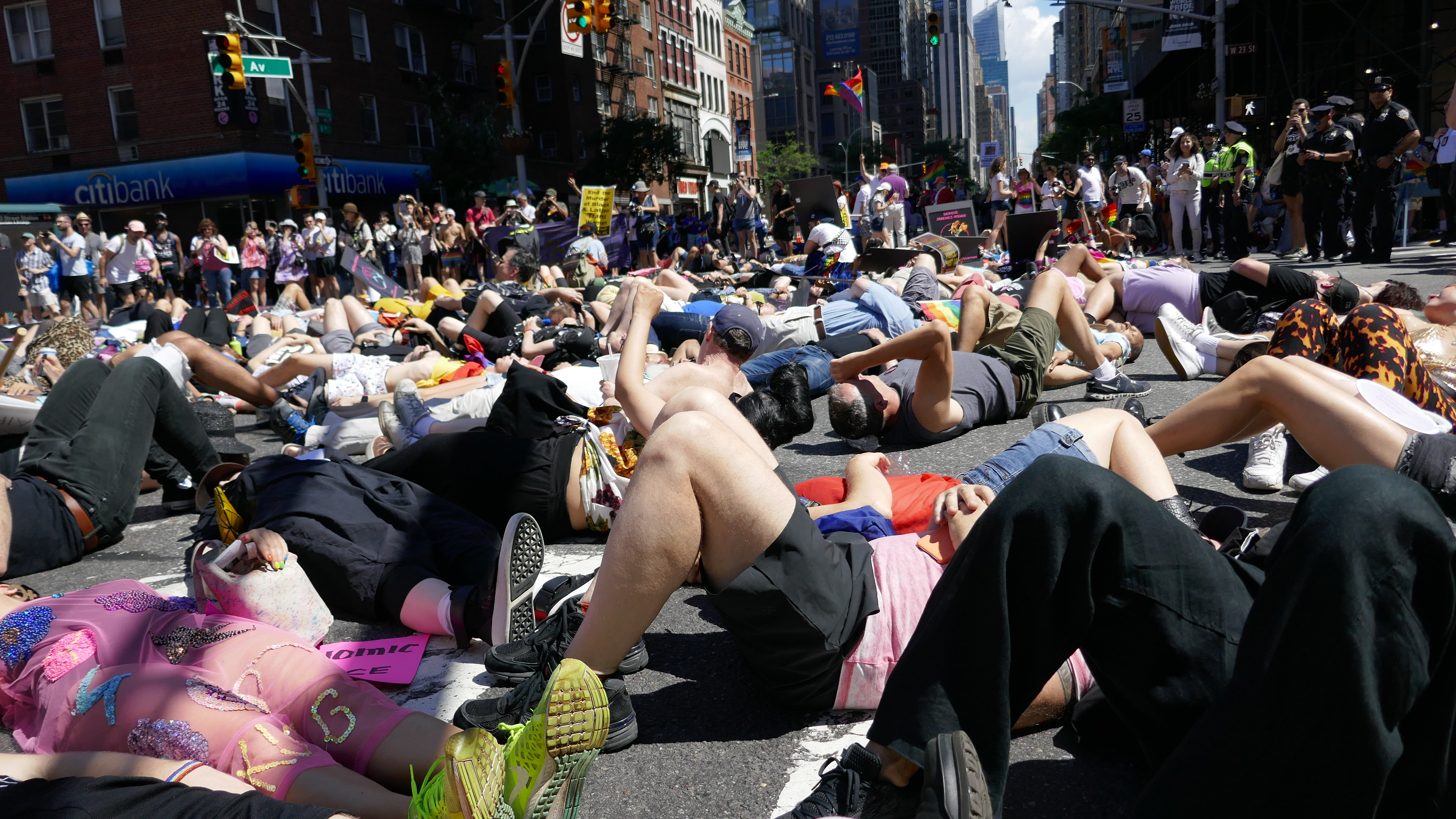
Die-in during the 2019 march, at 6th Avenue and 23rd Street

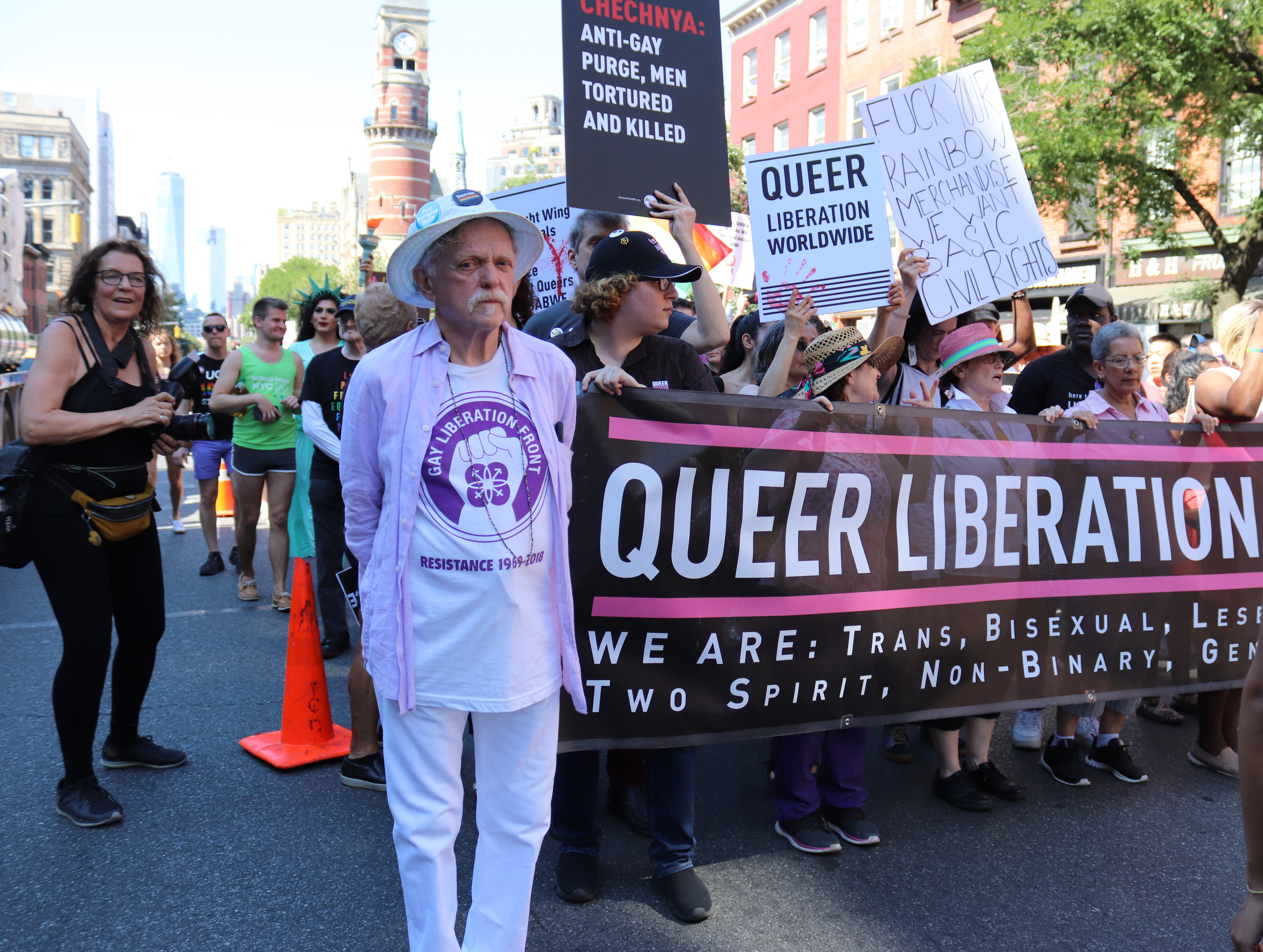
An original member of the Gay Liberation Front stands beside the 2019 Queer Liberation March banner
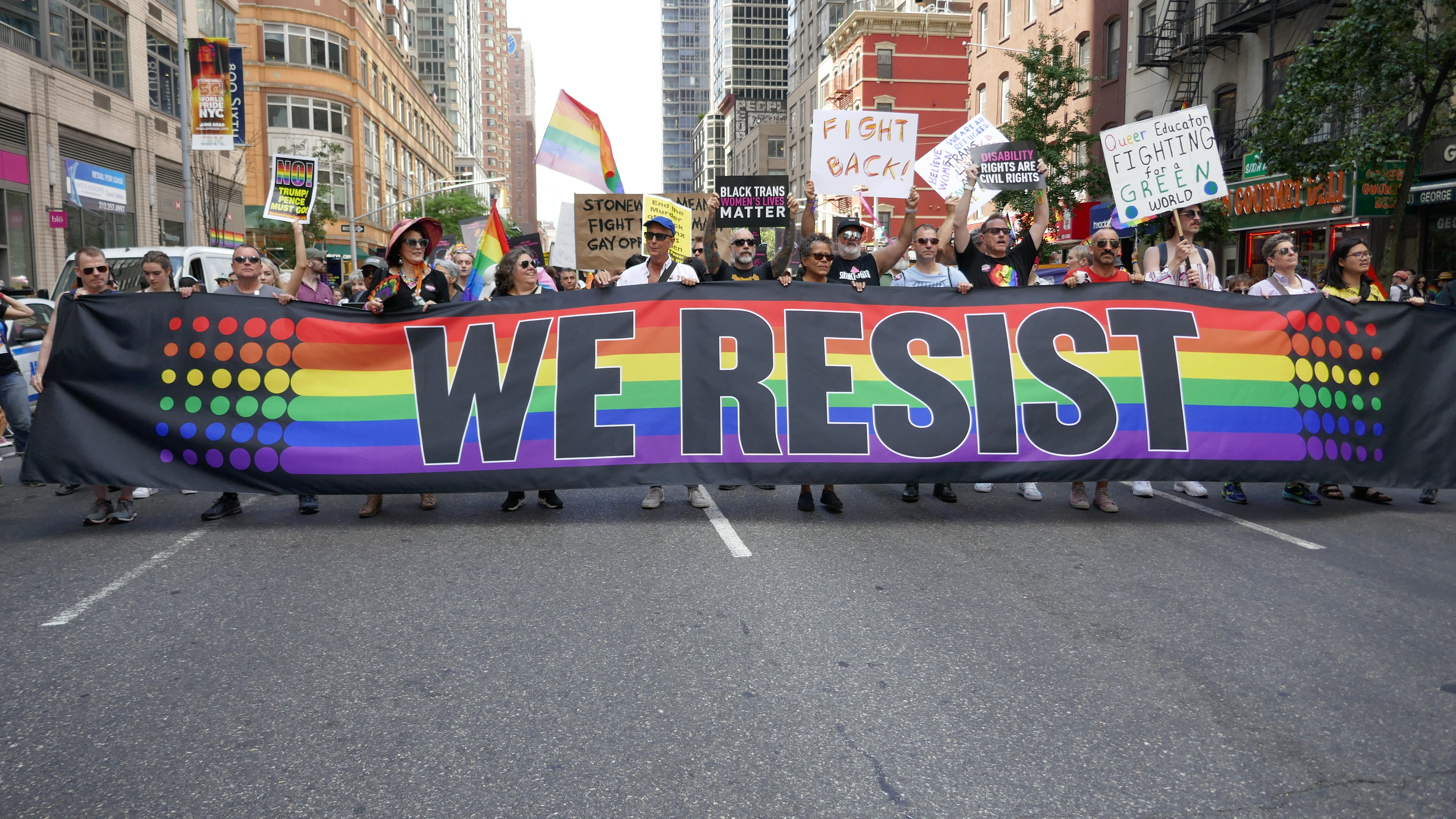

== See also ==
- Critical pride
- Night pride
- Rainbow capitalism
- Pinkwashing
- Police and prison abolition
- LGBTQ culture in New York City
