= Madrid Pride =

Annual LGBT event in Madrid, Spain

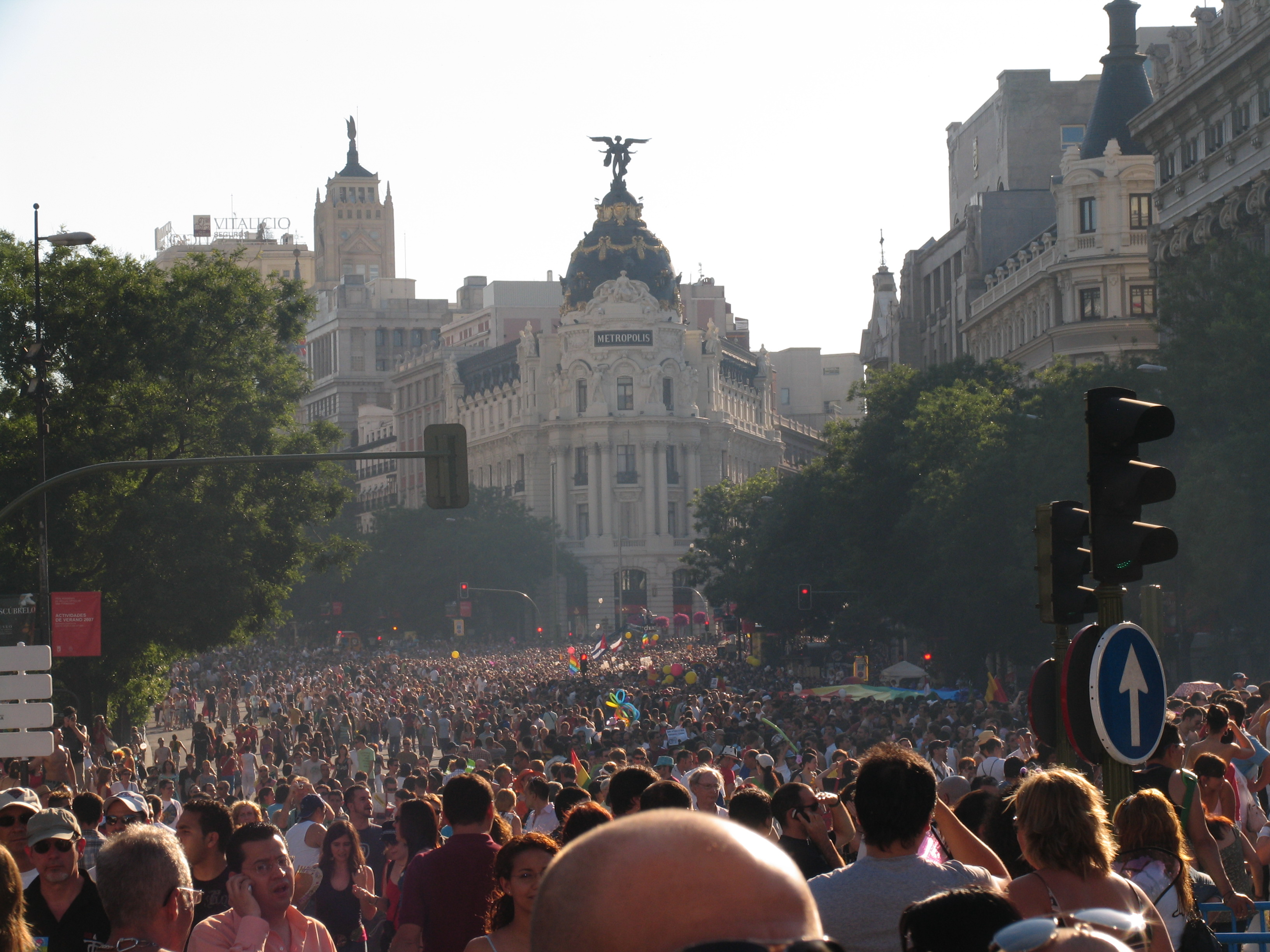
Europride parade in Madrid. Crowds at Alcalá street seen from Cibeles square (2007).

Madrid Pride, popularly known in Spanish as the Orgullo Gay de Madrid or La Noche de Patos and its acronym MADO, is the annual LGBT pride festival hosted at Chueca neighbourhood in the centre of Madrid, during the weekend immediately after June 28, International Day of LGBT Pride.

The celebration usually begins Wednesday afternoon with the popular announcement at Chueca Square, carried out by notorious public figures, and ends on Sunday, after the parade of claiming floats that takes place on Saturday.

Madrid Pride has gone from being a small concentration of people in the late 1970s and early 1980s to being considered the biggest LGBT party in Europe and one of the most important in the world, only surpassed by the city of San Francisco (California), attracting more than a million and a half people each year (300,000 of them foreign tourists) and with an estimated contribution to the economy of the city over €150 million in 2015, consecrating itself as one of the most important and multitudinous festivals in all of Spain. As of June 2019, it is Europe’s largest Pride event. (Note: As of June 2019, New York City’s NYC Pride March is North America’s biggest Pride parade. For Stonewall 50 – WorldPride NYC 2019 up to five million took part over the final weekend, with an estimated four million in attendance at the parade. São Paulo, Brazil’s event, Parada do Orgulho GLBT de São Paulo, is South America’s largest, and is listed by Guinness World Records as the world’s largest Pride parade starting in 2006 with 2.5 million people. They broke the Guinness record in 2009 with four million attendees. They have kept the title from 2006 to at least 2016. They had five million attend in 2017. As of 2019 it has three to five million each year. As of June 2019, Spain‘s Madrid Pride, Orgullo Gay de Madrid (MADO), is Europe’s biggest, it had 3.5 million attendees when it hosted WorldPride in 2017. As of June 2019 the largest LGBTQ events include: in Asia it is Taiwan Pride in Taiwan’s Taipei; in the Middle East it is Tel Aviv Pride in Israel; in Oceania, it is Australia’s Sydney Mardi Gras Parade; in Africa it is South Africa’s Johannesburg Pride.)

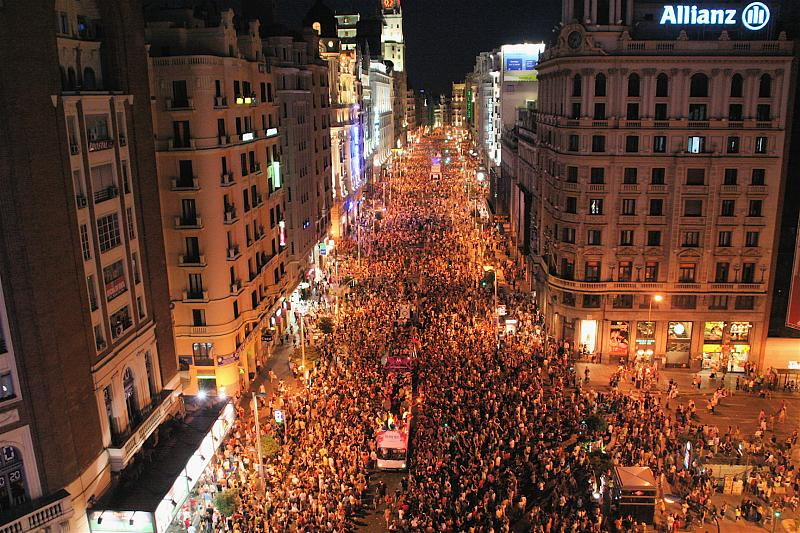
Crowds at Gran Vía avenue in downtown Madrid during the Madrid Pride parade (2008).

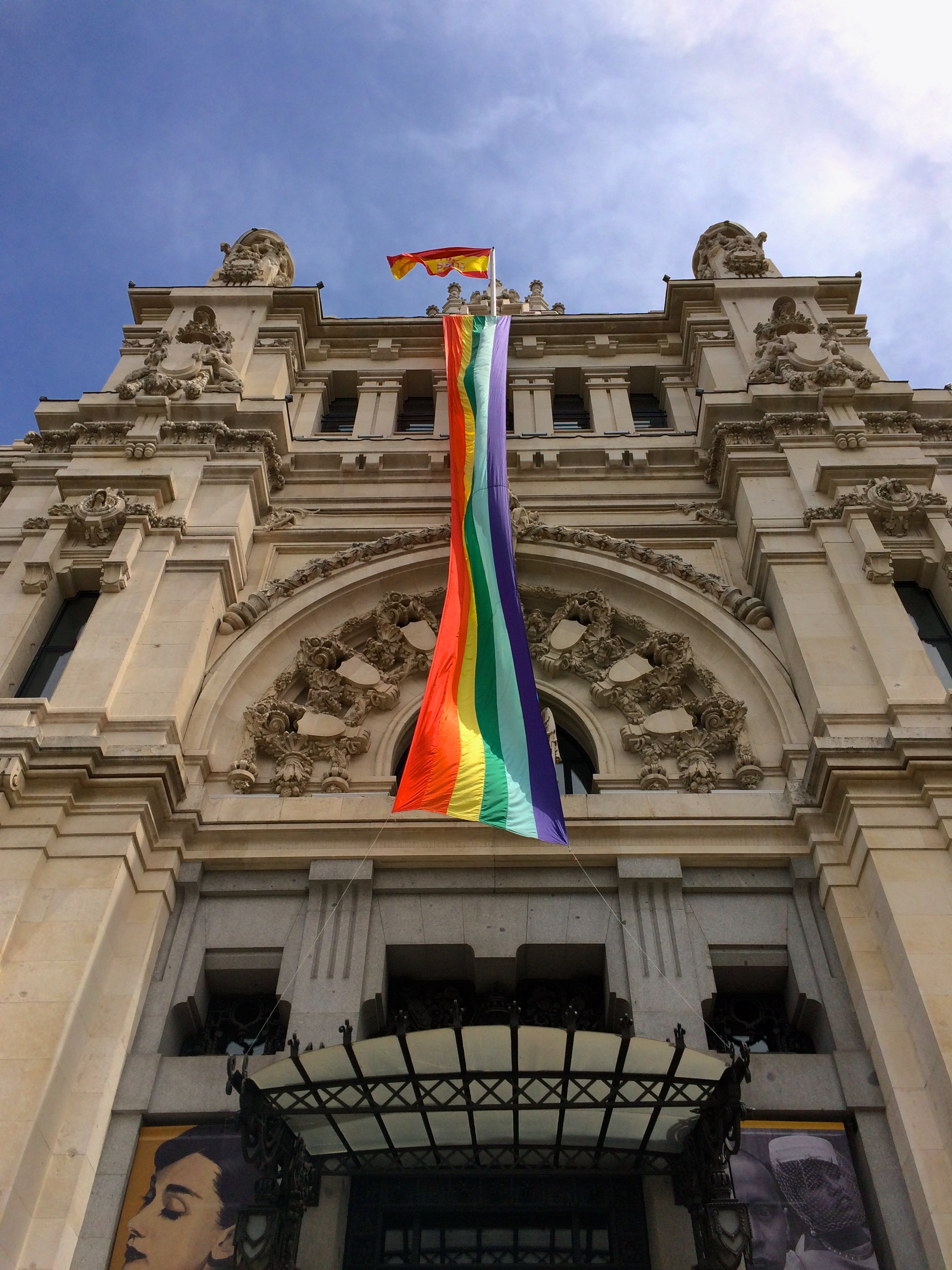
Façade of Madrid City Hall with the rainbow flag during Madrid Pride (2015).

In July 2017 Madrid hosted WorldPride Madrid 2017, the 5th Edition of the biggest LGBT event in the world.

== History ==
After the incidents of June 28, 1969 in the New York pub Stonewall Inn, mass demonstrations occurred in many cities worldwide but in Spain the dictatorial Franco regime of the time suppressed the news and attempted to prevent any spread of the movement to Spain. Thus, it was not until 1977, two years after Franco's death, that a gay rights demonstration was held in Barcelona. It consisted of 4,000 people, and was broken up by the authorities. The following year, in 1978, the demonstration was authorized in Madrid and since then, except in 1980, Madrid Pride has been celebrated annually. From those first years, the demonstration has started at Santo Domingo square and finished at Puerta del Sol square.

In 1986, a seminar on homosexuality was organized in Chueca neighbourhood, which was the seed to constitute the Lesbian, Gay, Transsexual and Bisexual Group of Madrid (COGAM, from Colectivo de Lesbianas, Gays, Transexuales y Bisexuales de Madrid). At that time it was becoming common that after the demonstration the participants returned to Chueca to celebrate and the protest started taking on a festive character. Years later, in 1996, the magazine Shangay introduced in the parade the first carriage, with Alaska cheering the parade. Since then, the number of people has been increasing each year.

In 2005, with the approval of equal marriage in Spain, there was an explosion of assistance to Madrid Pride, which for the first time reached up to two million people. This made Madrid to be chosen as the European capital of Pride, celebrating Europride 2007, which was attended by more than 2.5 million people from around the world.

In October 2012, InterPride members voted in favor of holding the 5th WorldPride 2017 Edition to the city of Madrid, surpassing Berlin and Sydney.

Nowadays, nearly 2 million people are out on the streets during the Pride Week, thus becoming one of the most crowded parties, not only in the capital, but also in the whole Spain, and being the European city with the largest number of attendees to the march of Pride, far above cities like London or Paris and only behind the San Francisco Pride.

In 2016, the number of concerts and security of the event was increased in order to start preparing for 2017, in which Madrid will celebrate the largest LGBT event in the world, the WorldPride, being expected a record attendance of 3 million people. Large concerts were installed in larger spaces such as Puerta del Sol, Plaza de España and Puerta de Alcalá. The City Council declared the Madrid Pride Celebrations as a Festival of General Interest in July 2016.

== WorldPride Madrid 2017 ==
In October 2012, InterPride's membership voted at its annual conference in Boston, Massachusetts, United States, to award WorldPride 2017 to the city of Madrid, Spain. The other candidate cities to host the event in 2017 were Berlin and Sydney, but Madrid won unanimously in the voting of more than 80 delegations from around the world.

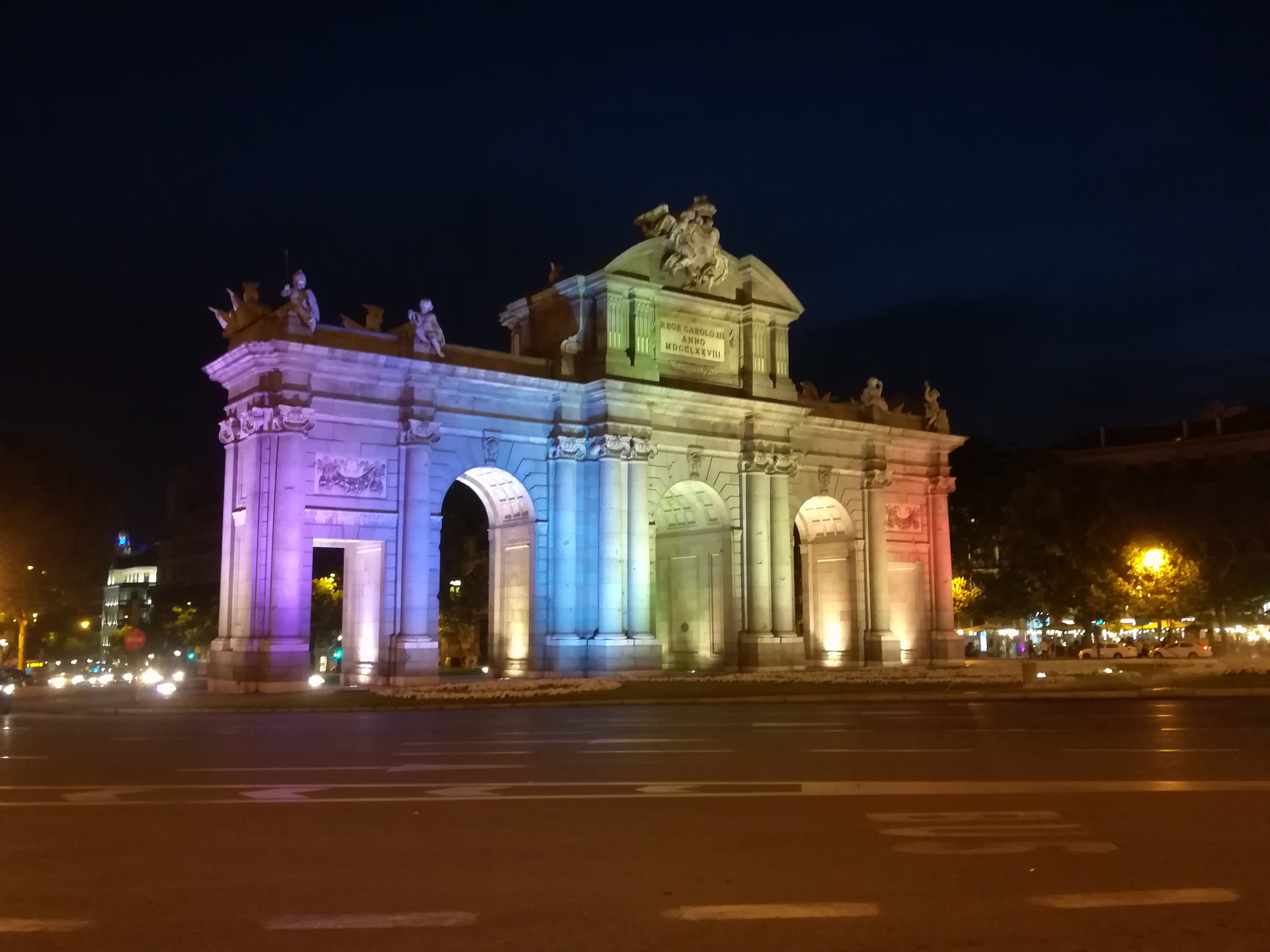
Puerta de Alcalá, Madrid, illuminated with the rainbow colours during the celebrations of WorldPride 2017

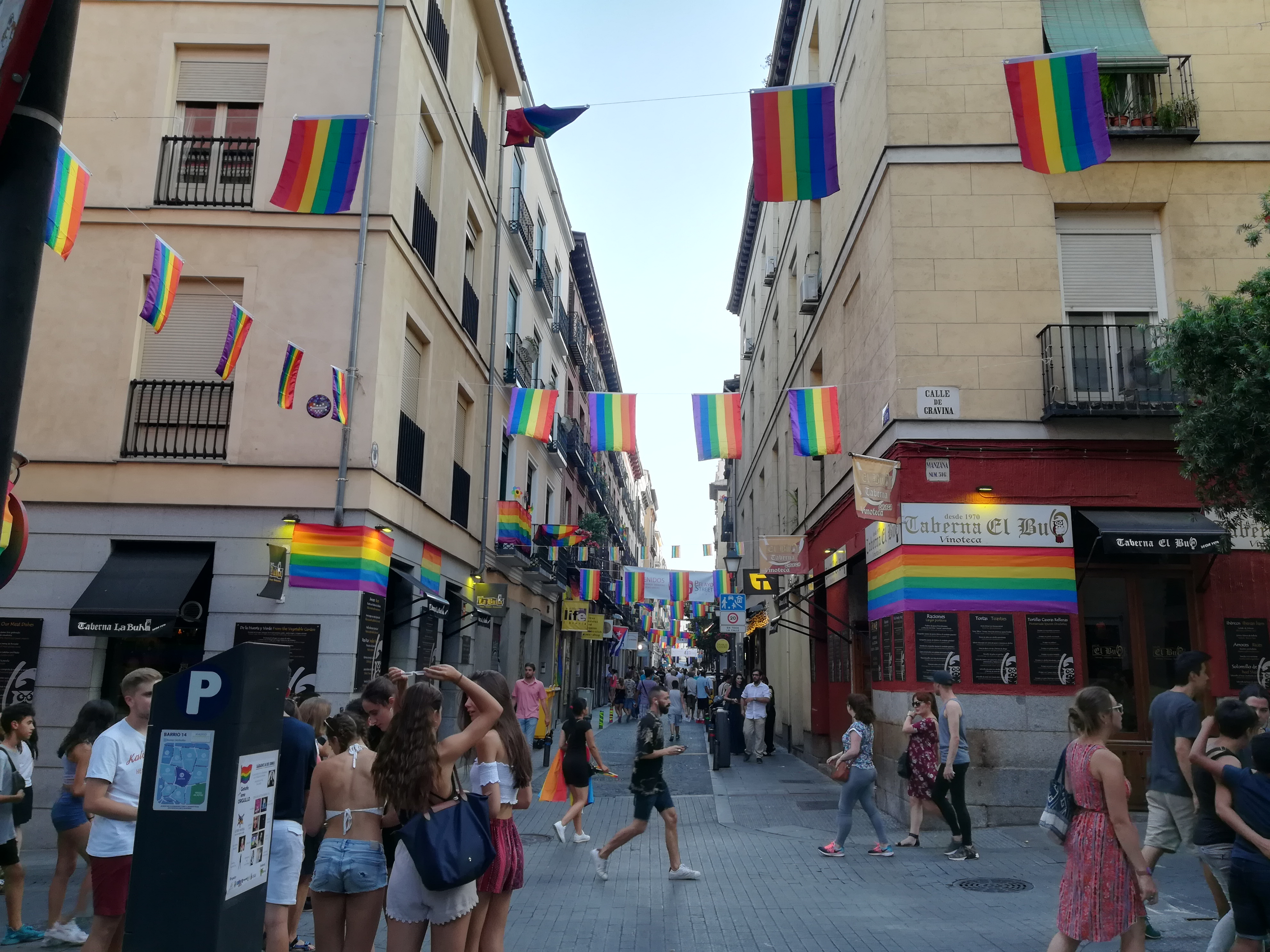
Street in Chueca neighbourhood (Madrid) during WorldPride 2017

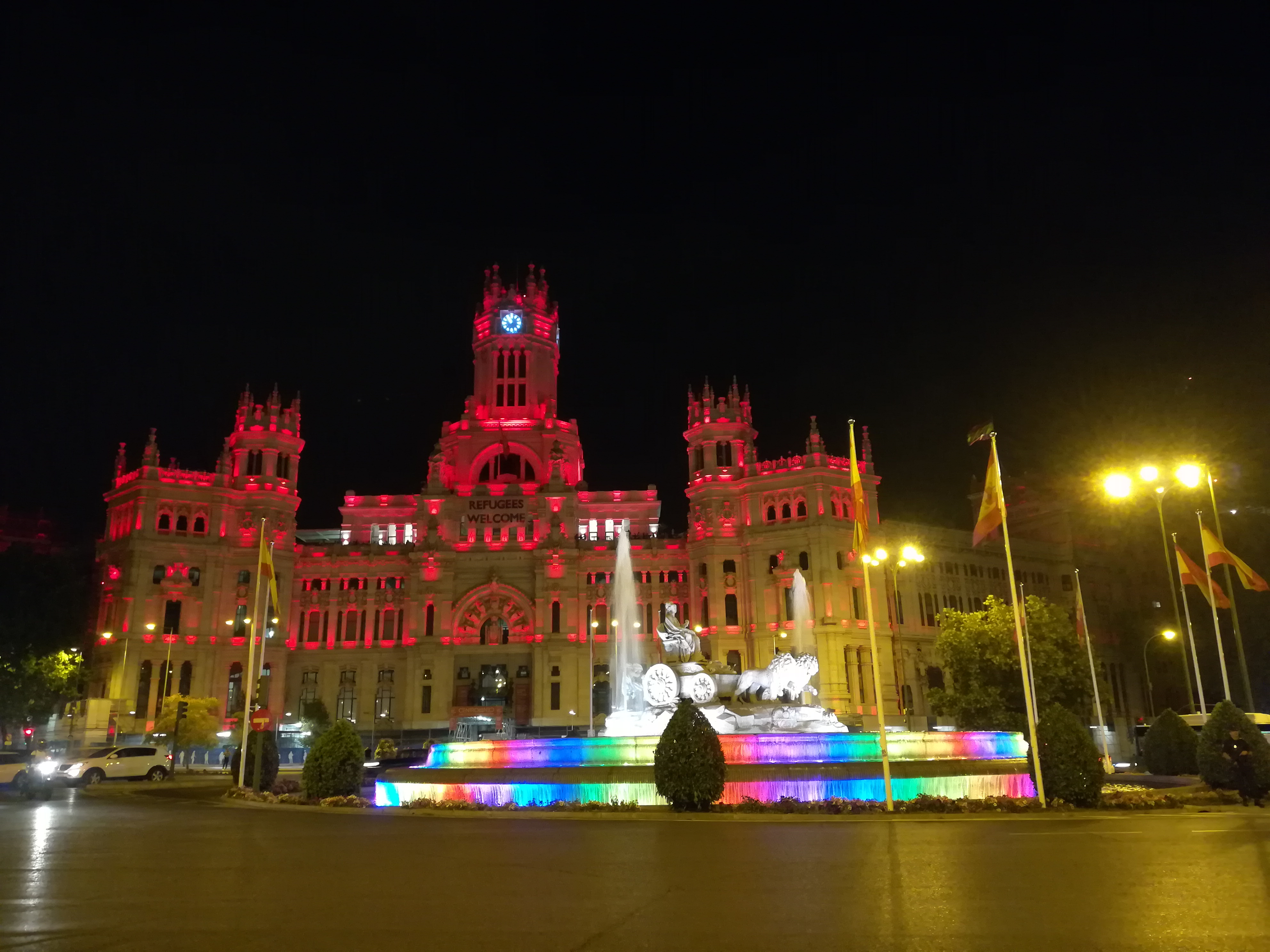
Cibeles Fountain, Madrid, illuminated with the rainbow colours during the celebrations of WorldPride 2017

This celebration in Madrid coincided in time with the 24th Europride, which was hosted for the second time in the Spanish capital (the first one was in 2007). It took place from June 23 to 2 July 2017. The event's slogan was "Whoever you love, Madrid loves you!", and the song chosen as the anthem was ¿A quién le importa? by Alaska y Dinarama, which was specially adapted for the event with the collaboration of several Spanish popular singers among the LGBT community, including Fangoria (band) -the group of two of the three former members of Alaska y Dinarama-.

WorldPride Madrid 2017 also coincided with two key anniversaries in the history of the LGBT community in Madrid and Spain: the 40th anniversary of the first demonstration in Spain in support of the rights of homosexual people -which took place in Barcelona in 1977- and the 25th anniversary of the foundation of the State Federation of Lesbians, Gays, Transsexuals and Bisexuals (FELGTB, from Federación Estatal de Lesbianas, Gays, Transexuales y Bisexuales).

The opening ceremony of the event took place at the Calderón Theatre on Friday, June 23, 2017. Few days later, on Monday, June 26, the Madrid Summit, the International Conference on Human Rights, was inaugurated at the Autonomous University. Several cultural events took place in the subsequent days, including the traditional and massive demonstration on July 1, with up to 52 carriages going all over the 2 kilometers between Atocha (Plaza del Emperador Carlos V) and Plaza de Colón. The WorldPride closing ceremony took place on July 2, giving the baton to New York City for the celebration of WorldPride 2019.

== See also ==
- Critical pride
