= Heritage of Pride =

New York City nonprofit organization

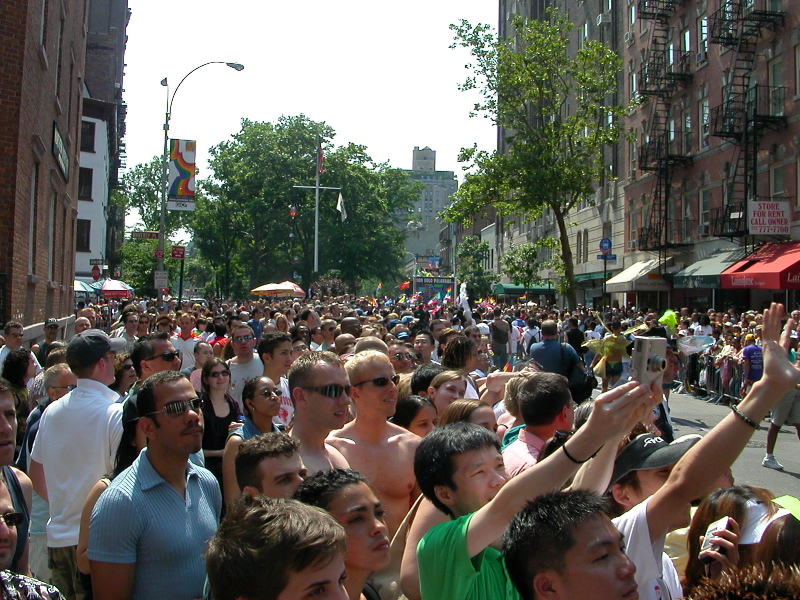
- Spectators along Christopher Street for the Pride March in 2003
- Nickname: NYC Pride
- Formation: 1984; 42 years ago
- Type: Non-profit organization
- Legal status: 501(c)(3) organization
- Purpose: LGBTQIA+ Pride events
- Website: nycpride.org

Heritage of Pride (HOP), doing business as NYC Pride, is a 501(c)(3) non-profit organization that plans and produces the official New York City LGBTQIA+ Pride Week events each June. HOP began working on the events in 1984, taking on the work previously done by the Christopher Street Liberation Day Committee organizers of the first NYC Pride March in 1970. HOP also took over responsibility for the operations of NYC's Pride Festival and Pride Rally. It was that first march that brought national attention to 1969's Stonewall Riots. The late sixties saw numerous protests and riots across the United States on many social injustices and from general political unrest including the war in Vietnam.

After events in New York, Los Angeles, and Chicago in June 1970, Pride chapters formed in cities across the US. Pride London was the first non-US city to rise in support of Gay Rights in 1972 and Pride festivals (or Christopher Street Days) now occur on six continents. The official LGBTQIA+ Pride events for New York City end on the last Sunday of each June. Additional New York City events in the outer boroughs are organized by Bronx, Brooklyn, Queens, and Staten Island Pride chapters.

== Organization ==
HOP is a volunteer-spearheaded organization working by Robert's Rules 50 weeks a year to execute the activities of NYC Pride Week. The voting membership elects two volunteer co-chairs onto an executive board composed of committee directors (also volunteers) and their executive director (the most senior of staff). Until 2002 all NYC Pride Week activities were organized solely by volunteers. That January, Anthony D. Dean began work as the first full-time paid Business Development Director of NYC Pride events. By late 2016 HOP had five employees working year-round from a rented basement office on Christopher Street. They assist in coordinating the desires of members who work on behalf of the larger community. Membership is open to all individuals. As of December 2024, the Executive Director is Sandra Perez who assumed the leadership of the organization in November 2021. She succeed David Correa, who served as Interim Executive Director after the departure of long time Director, Chris Frederick in December 2019.

== Events ==
What began as a march has grown to more than a dozen events which compose NYC PRIDE week including The March, The Rally, PrideFest, and Pride Island, a multi-day cultural experience that is an evolution from HOP's Dance on the Pier (1987–2017). Pride Island is the final event held each year. Beginning with June 24, 1990, the closing event has culminated with the second largest annual fireworks display in Manhattan, bested only by Macy's 4th of July Fireworks. HOP's Stonewall50 Planning Committee began work in July 2009. Additional programming was envisioned for the coming years and by 2011 new events had become a reality. This would eventually lead to a successful bid for the first UUS-hosted WorldPride, Stonewall 50 – WorldPride NYC 2019.

The concept for WorldPride events was established in 1997 when HOP hosted the 16th annual conference of InterPride. The first of these was WorldPride Rome 2000, followed by Tel Aviv, London, Toronto, and Madrid.

During Pride Month an organization such as HOP brings together many facets of the community asking they join voices and speak as one. In 2017 a new voice was added. ABC7 broadcast three hours of HOP's Pride March (the actual event run time was 9 hours, 38 minutes) as did their sister network covering the Chicago Pride Parade. Both networks continue to make that content available on the internet wherever there is access to such information, for the next year. The New York broadcast was nominated for a New York Emmy Award in both 2018 and 2019.

== Pride March route ==
2017's NYC LGBT Pride March brought together more than 450 contingents including 110 floats. The route traversed Fifth Avenue below the New York Public Library and after turning on 8th Street included more of Greenwich Village. The 1970 March was up Sixth Avenue and ended with a Gay-In in Sheeps Meadow, Central Park. The route itself has changed direction and span many times. The March route in New York does pass in front of the Stonewall Inn on Christopher Street, the location of the Stonewall riots which launched the modern gay rights movement.

== Collaborations ==
Heritage of Pride is a founding member of InterPride and a member of Northeast Regional Pride (NERP), the International Lesbian, Gay, Bisexual, Trans and Intersex Association (IGLA), the National Gay and Lesbian Task Force, and the International LGBTQ+ Travel Association.

The theme chosen for 2018 was "Defiantly Different". The opening event held on June 14, 2018, was HOP's inaugural Human Rights Conference, held at SUNY Global Center and included 20 different workshops and panel discussions. Programming was a collaborative effort of HOP, SUNY, United Nations, GMHC, SAGE, OutRight Action International and The NYC LGBT Center with participation from a range of others including Columbia Law School, Weill Cornell Center for Human Rights, OutServe-SLDN, The Dru Project, and the Matthew Shepard Foundation. The 2019 theme in New York and many other cities is Millions of Moments.

== Awards ==
Heritage of Pride annually grants the Marsha P. Johnson "Don't Be Outraged, Be Outrageous" Award. The winner in 1995 was the float sponsored by the AIDS Prevention Action League. The winner in 2017 was Desmond is Amazing.

== See also ==
- New York City LGBT Pride March
- LGBT history
- LGBT culture in New York City
- Queer Liberation March
- Reclaim Pride Coalition
