= Critical pride =

Spanish LGBTQ advocacy group

Critical Pride
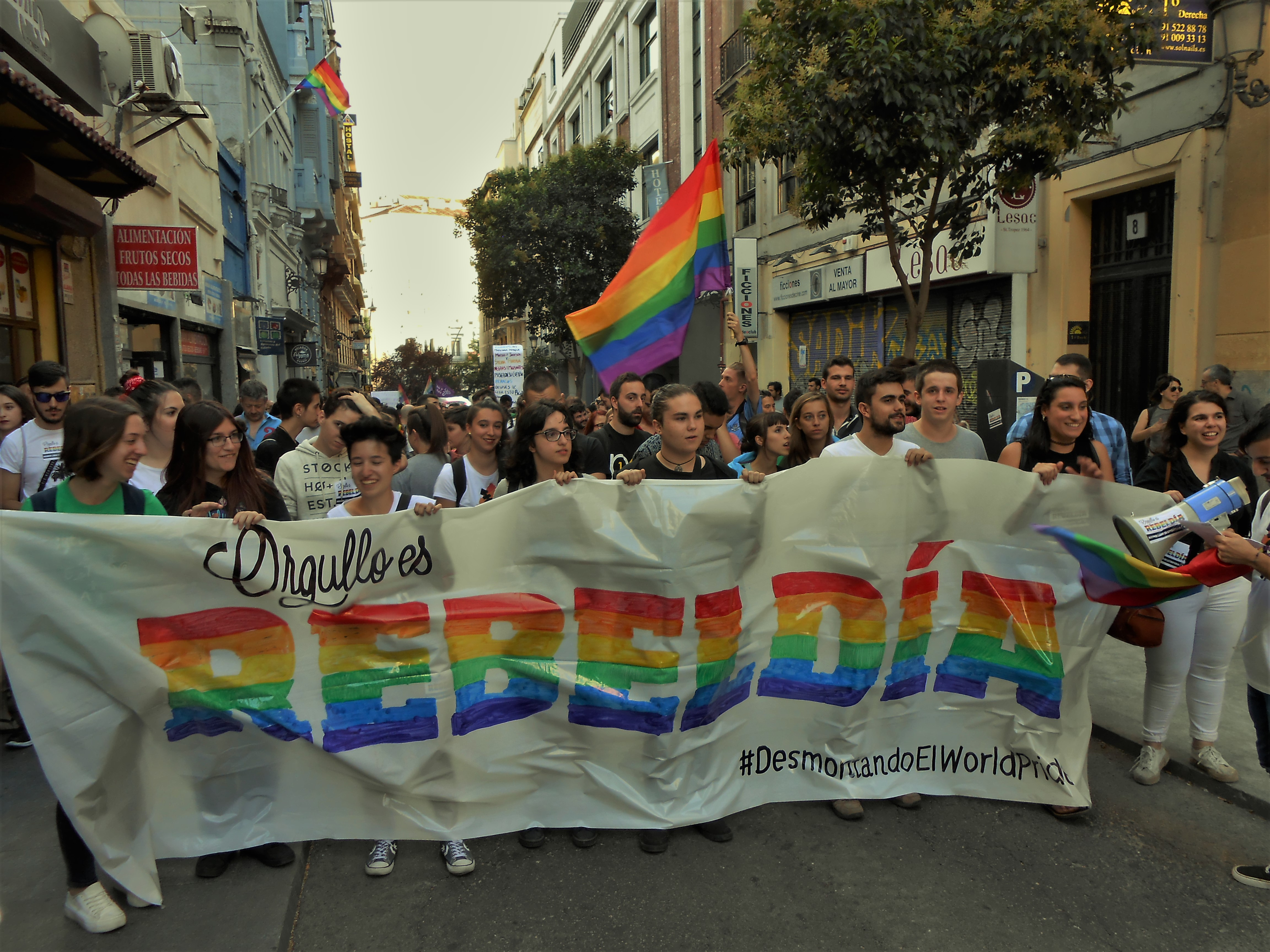
- Native name: Orgullo Crítico
- Date: June
- Location: Madrid and other Spanish cities
- Also known as: Alternative Pride; Indignant Pride; Orgullo transmaricabollo
- Type: Protest demonstration
- Theme: LGBTQ

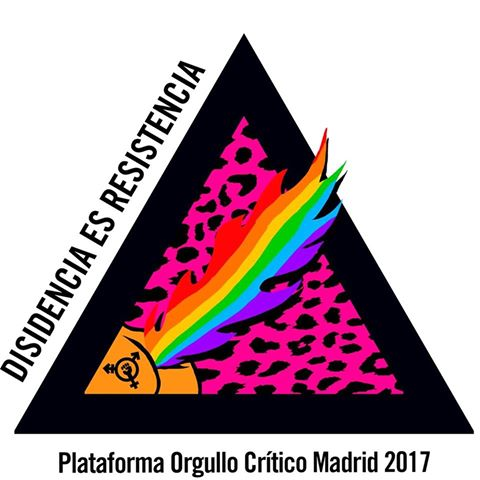
Logo of Critical Pride Madrid 2017

Critical pride (Spanish: Orgullo crítico) is the name of several annual protest demonstrations of LGBTQ people held in Madrid and several other Spanish cities. The organizers of critical pride demonstrations present them as an alternative to the original pride parades and festivals, which they consider depoliticized and institutionalized.

The movement calls for the non-commodification and repolitization of gay pride, and criticizes pink capitalism, gentrification, homonormativity, pinkwashing and homonationalism.

== History ==
1997 was the year of the first demonstration of homosexual freedom in Spain, a country that has faced a messy history with LGBT issues throughout its history. The first gay pride demonstration was in commemoration of the Stonewall riots which took place in New York in 1969, and the demonstrations from there only grew as a consequence of new legislative changes such as the legalization of same-sex marriage in 2005. By 2014, Madrid Gay Pride experienced a turnover of over one million people, according to the organizers. Gay pride festivals began to take place yearly in over 26 Spanish cities, oftentimes in collaboration with an array of activist organizations, nonprofits, and even for-profit companies. This resulted in what many people perceived as a turn from an active counter-culture to a spectacle for ideology to walk hand-in-hand with commercial floats of large companies. Begonia Enguix writes, "The participation of commercially sponsored floats along with the large influx of tourists that visit Madrid feed the discussions on the commercialization of the event and on the relationship between neoliberalism, identity and protest."

This is a sentiment felt by LGBT communities across the world, and one U.S. citizen comments on the commercialization in the San Francisco Pride festival, saying, "It just feels like a big Miller Lite tent. With the corporate floats ... it’s co-opting queer identity as a way to make money." While queer activists knew that these festivals were important to stand up to LGBT discrimination and violence throughout the world, many found that the parade had become too white, corporate, and straight to appropriately show LGBT solidarity, so they decided to create their own.

Since 2006 it has been organized in Madrid as an alternative demonstration to MADO, recovering the date of 28 of June to remember the fighting spirit of Stonewall with an anticapitalist, transfeminist, antiracist and antiableist perspective. In 2014, Spain's critical pride festival marched with anti capitalistic stances under the motto "Orgullo es Decisión," or "Pride is Decision," and 500 people protested. One protester said, "we went out on the streets to shout that Pride is struggle, it is decision, it is protest, pride is ours, it is not a business, it is not in the hands of politicians nor entrepreneurs and it will never be."

== Gay Shame ==
The activist collective Gay Shame formed in New York City in 1998. The movement drew on the feeling, shared by many queer scholars of the time, that the transformative potential of gay pride had been exhausted and that the term had instead become synonymous with assimilation and the commodification of gay and lesbian identity. Contrasting with the exuberance, colorfulness, and flamboyance typically associated with Gay Pride events, the tongue-in-cheek image of a silent, orderly march through the backstreets, such as that presented by queer theorist José Esteban Muñoz in his 1999 book Disidentifications, asserted that, for many, the feelings of shame and self-loathing equated with life in the closet persisted into the present moment.

The movement was born at a very specific historical moment in which the city's image was being remade from the top-down. Mayor Giuliani's "Quality of Life" campaign mobilized the police force against small offenses and petty crimes, such as public urination, marijuana possession, and public drunkenness. New zoning laws forced the relocation of businesses catering to gays, particularly queer men, to the periphery, exacerbating the isolation and lack of opportunity and resources for gay social and sexual life in the city. Urban development led by private investment pursued luxury housing and other commercial interests at the expense of a community focus. Gay Shame was particularly disgusted with this urban project, with the antisex zoning laws, and the new look and feel of the city. However, some gay property owners and business people in neighborhoods on the frontline of the gentrification battle were lending their support. In fact, gay people have long been seen as playing a direct role as "pioneers" in fringe areas who ultimately make neighborhoods safer for capital development.

In this context, Fed Up Queers (FUQ) activist Jennifer Flynn states, "Gay Shame emerged to create a radical alternative to the conformity of gay bars, neighborhoods, and institutions - most clearly symbolized by Gay Pride. By 1998, New York’s Gay Pride had become little more than a giant opportunity for multi-national corporations to target-market to gay consumers...The goal of Gay Shame was to create a free, all-ages space where queers could make culture and share skills and strategies for resistance, rather than just buying a bunch of crap." The focus of the movement was thus not on the feeling of shame itself, but on the shamefulness of a manifestation of gay pride that facilitates gay consumerism, gay gentrification, and gay mainstreaming. The movement embraces shame as a counterdiscourse to pride and employs shame to critically engage with what they see as the shortcomings of gay pride characterized by participation in a capitalist consumer market.

In 2003, the University of Michigan at Ann Arbor held an international Gay Shame Conference from March 27 to 29, congregating nearly fifty scholars, critics, writers, activists, artists, students, and journalists for two and a half days of discussion, documentation, and performance. It was prompted by the celebrations of Gay Shame that were by then popping up across the US, Canada, and Europe to criticize contemporary gay politics and challenge the mainstream definition and practice of "gay pride." The stated purpose of the conference was to "inquire into various aspects of lesbian and gay male sexuality, history, and culture that ‘gay pride’ has had the effect of suppressing" and strived "to confront the shame that lesbians, gay men, and ‘queers’ of all sorts still experience in society; to explore the transformative impulses that spring from such experiences of shame; and to ask what affirmative uses can be made of these residual experiences of shame now that not all gay people are condemned to live in shame."

== Gay Pride today ==
Today, Barcelona and Madrid are the central places for many cultural events. In fact, Madrid hosts the largest gay pride parades in Europe. Today, Chueca, a neighborhood in Madrid, is the epicenter of Pride. During parades, The Plaza de Chueca is expected to be filled with concerts, dancing, and more. From the late 70s to today, Madrid’s pride parade has gone from a small number of people to one of the largest in the world. The parade, which usually takes place in the summer, was postponed in 2020 due to the COVID-19 pandemic. According to its organization, the Gay Pride parade purpose, "was to defend legal equality as an indispensable requisite in the fight against homophobia, and to protect certain inalienable rights of the entire population such as education against discrimination and quality health care for all."

Although Spain voted to legalize same-sex marriage back in 2005, there are still levels of discrimination especially in places outside large cities such as Madrid and Barcelona. According to a 2011 source, same sex marriages account for just 1.8 percent of the total marriages in Spain since its legalization in 2005. According to a Eurobarometer survey, 66% of survey takers were in support of same-sex marriage while only 43% recognized same sex couples right to adopt. While SSM was legalized in 2005, many were opposed to the passing of the law, specifically those of right leaning political views. However, the Prime Minister at the time, José Luis Rodríguez Zapatero said of the law, "Today the Spanish society returns [gays] the respect they deserve, recognize their rights, restore their dignity, affirm their identity and gives them back their freedom. In an election held in 2019, Spain's far right party Vox took 24 of 350 seats in congress, which was the first time a far right party sat in parliament since the death of Francisco Franco in 1975 except for Blas Piñar in 1979-1982. Created in 2013, the party's current leader, Santiago Abascal, has been vocal about his support for same sex unions as opposed to marriages, in addition to being against LGBTQ activism. Though still facing discrimination, the LGBTQ community in Spain has received much support and awareness since the abolition of the dictatorship in the 1970s, which is displayed in the size of their pride parades that are some of the largest in the world.

== See also ==
- Night pride
- Queer Liberation March
- Against Equality
- Gay Shame
- Queeruption
