= The Stonewall Operas =

The Stonewall Operas Outside The Pomada Inn The Community Nightlife
- by Bryan Blaskie; Brian Cavanagh-Strong; Kevin Cummines; TJ Rubin
- Librettist: Seth Christenfeld; Ben Bonnema; Shoshana Greenberg; Deepali Gupta
- Language: English
- Premiere: May 2019; Shubert Theatre

The Stonewall Operas, are a series of four mini-operas inspired by the 50th anniversary of the 1969 Stonewall Riots, the spark of the modern LGBTQ rights movement, which had their world premiere in May 2019 at New York University's Shubert Theatre and the Stonewall Inn, as part of the June, 2019 Stonewall 50 – WorldPride NYC 2019 celebrations, and the 2019 New York Opera Fest, a two-month celebration of the art form. The operas capped NYU's "Stonewall at 50", a series of events commemorating the riots and legacy.

They are the fourth collaboration between American Opera Projects (AOP), and the Advanced Opera Lab at NYU Tisch School of the Arts' Graduate Musical Theatre Writing Program where emerging opera writers create projects on historical New York City locations. Previous projects were produced about Brooklyn's Fort Greene Park, Judy Chicago's feminist piece The Dinner Party, on permanent display at The Brooklyn Museum, and New York City's International House.

The operas were performed by professional opera singers from AOP, directed by students from The New School's College of Performing Arts, choreographed by students from the Dance Department, and designed by students from Tisch's Design Department.

The four operas were:

- Outside, music by Bryan Blaskie, libretto by Seth Christenfeld, directed by Francisco Rivera Rodriguez
- The Pomada Inn, music by Brian Cavanagh-Strong, libretto by Ben Bonnema, directed by Sam Helfrich
- The Community, music by Kevin Cummines, libretto by Shoshana Greenberg, directed by I-Chen Wang
- Nightlife, music by TJ Rubin, libretto by Deepali Gupta, directed by Nina Fry

Outside and Nightlife are based on the Stonewall Riots themselves, while Pomada Inn follows two stories in present-day Kyiv and New York City, and The Community takes place 400 years in the future, in a "post-apocalyptic 2418".
