= Stone Wall (Australia) =

Stone Wall is an escarpment overlooking the Murchison River Gorge about 16 kilometres (9.9 mi) north-east of Kalbarri in Mid West Western Australia. It is of geological interest because it provides outstanding exposures of five Cretaceous formations unconformably overlying the Ordovician Tumblagooda sandstone. The Cretaceous formations contain trace fossils of Skolithos and Cylindricum. It has been visited on geological excursions and is considered an important research site.
