= Stonewall House =

Housing development in Brooklyn, New York

- Logo
- Interactive map of the Stonewall House area

General information
- Location: 112 Saint Edwards Street, Brooklyn, NY 11205
- Coordinates: 40°41′37″N 73°58′41″W
- Owner: BFC Partners

Technical details
- Floor count: 17
- Floor area: 124,500 square feet (11,570 m^{2})

Design and construction
- Architecture firm: Marvel

Website
- www.stonewallhousebk.com

Stonewall House is the first affordable, LGBTQ-friendly senior housing development in New York City. Located in the Fort Greene neighborhood of Brooklyn, it is the largest LGBT-friendly senior housing facility in the U.S. Stonewall House was opened in December 2019 by SAGE, an advocacy group for aging LGBTQ people.

== Building features ==
The 17 story building contains 145 units: 54 studio apartments and 91 single bedroom apartments. The ground floor contains a community center called SAGE Center Brooklyn. The community center is 7,000 square feet (650 m^{2}). The architect was Marvel and the owner is BFC Partners.

== Services ==
The Stonewall House provides housing for adults age 62 or older who make less than or equal to half of the area's median income. Residents pay no more than 30 percent of their income for rent, due to the project-based Section 8 contract.

A community center is also run within the building. This community center hosts weekly movies, special events, field trips. The center also provides meals and activities for people over 60.
