= NYC Pride March =

Event celebrating the LGBTQ community

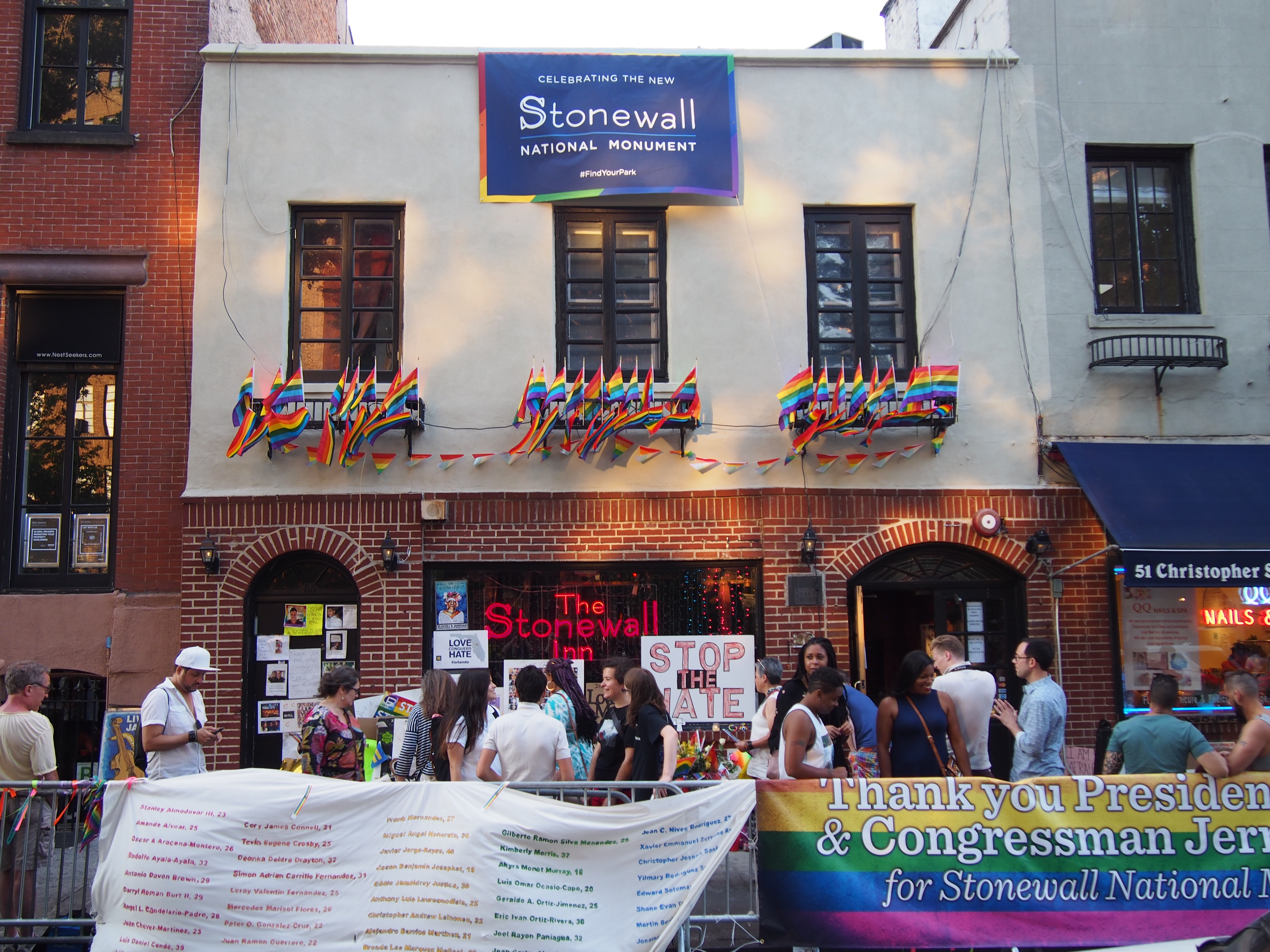
- The Stonewall Inn in Greenwich Village was the site of the June 1969 Stonewall riots. That event in New York City's queer history has served as a touchstone for various LGBTQ social movements, as well as the catalyst for Pride parades around the world.
- Frequency: Annually, last Sunday in June
- Locations: New York City, U.S.
- Inaugurated: June 28, 1970, as part of Christopher Street Liberation Day
- Next event: June 28, 2027
- Organizer: Heritage of Pride, since 1984

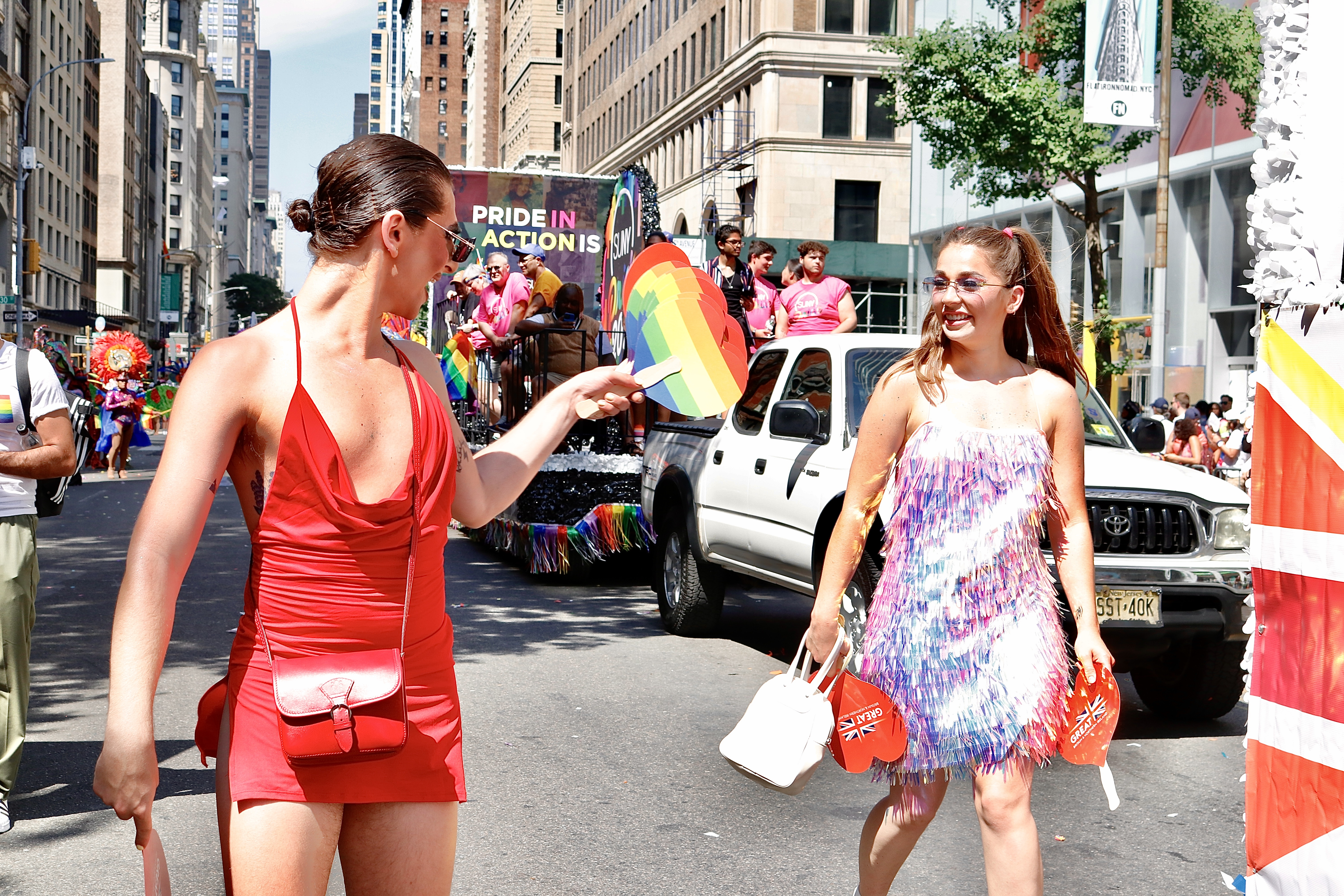
Participants gather for the 2022 New York City Pride March, its first return since 2019.

The NYC Pride March is an annual event celebrating the LGBTQ community in New York City. The largest pride parade and the largest pride event in the world, the NYC Pride March attracts hundreds of thousands of participants and millions of sidewalk spectators each June, and carries spiritual and historical significance for the worldwide LGBTQ community and its advocates. Entertainer Madonna stated in 2024, "Aside from my birthday, New York Pride is the most important day of the year." The route through Lower Manhattan travels southward on Fifth Avenue, winding through Greenwich Village and passing the Stonewall National Monument, site of the June 1969 riots that launched the modern movement for LGBTQ rights.

A central component of NYC Pride observances, the March occurs on the last Sunday in June. An estimated 4 million attended the parade in 2019, coinciding with the 50th anniversary of Stonewall, which drew 5 million visitors to Manhattan on Pride weekend and was the largest international LGBTQ event in history. The 2020 (51st) and 2021 (52nd) editions of NYC Pride March were cancelled due to the COVID-19 pandemic in New York City. The NYC Pride March returned on June 26, 2022, two days after the landmark Dobbs v. Jackson Women's Health Organization ruling. During the ruling, Roe v. Wade was overturned; in a concurring opinion, Supreme Court Justice Clarence Thomas proposed that the Court "should reconsider" past rulings establishing marriage equality and gay rights.

== Origins ==
Early on the morning of Saturday, June 28, 1969, lesbian, gay, bisexual, and transgender (LGBT) people rioted following a police raid on the Stonewall Inn, a gay bar at 53 Christopher Street in Greenwich Village, Lower Manhattan. This event, alongside further protests and rioting over the following nights, marked a watershed moment in the modern LGBT rights movement and the impetus for organizing pride parades on a much larger scale. The Stonewall Veterans Association, formed by veterans of the riot, has continued to drive the advancement of LGBT rights from the riot to the present day.

In the weeks following the riots, 500 people gathered for a "Gay Power" demonstration in Washington Square Park, followed by a march to Sheridan Square within the West Village.

On November 2, 1969, Craig Rodwell, his partner Fred Sargeant, Ellen Broidy, and Linda Rhodes proposed an annual march to be held in New York City by way of a resolution at the Eastern Regional Conference of Homophile Organizations (ERCHO) meeting in Philadelphia.

We propose that a demonstration be held annually on the last Saturday in June in New York City to commemorate the 1969 spontaneous demonstrations on Christopher Street and this demonstration be called CHRISTOPHER STREET LIBERATION DAY. No dress or age regulations shall be made for this demonstration.

We also propose that we contact Homophile organizations throughout the country and suggest that they hold parallel demonstrations on that day. We propose a nationwide show of support.

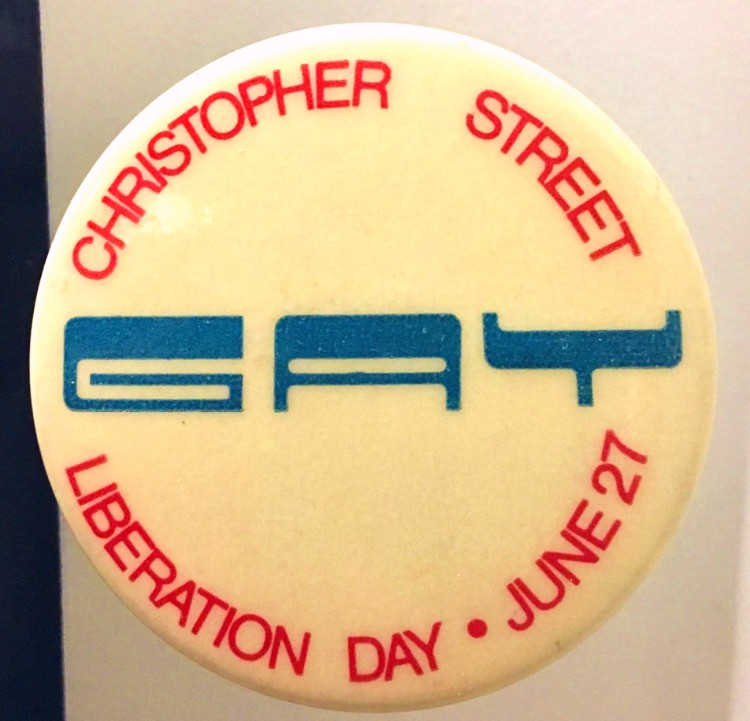
Christopher Street Liberation Day button promoting the second annual NYC Pride March on June 27, 1971

All attendees to the ERCHO meeting in Philadelphia voted for the march except for Mattachine Society of New York, which abstained. Members of the Gay Liberation Front (GLF) attended the meeting and were seated as guests of Rodwell's group, Homophile Youth Movement in Neighborhoods (HYMN).

Meetings to organize the march began in early January at Rodwell's apartment in 350 Bleecker Street. At first there was difficulty getting some major New York City organizations, such as Gay Activists Alliance (GAA), to send representatives. Craig Rodwell and his partner Fred Sargeant, Ellen Broidy, Michael Brown, Marty Nixon, and Foster Gunnison Jr. of Mattachine made up the core group of the CSLD Umbrella Committee (CSLDUC). For initial funding, Gunnison served as treasurer and sought donations from national homophile organizations and sponsors, Sargeant solicited donations via the Oscar Wilde Memorial Bookshop customer mailing list, and Nixon worked to gain financial support from GLF in his position as treasurer. Other mainstays of the organizing committee include Judy Miller, Jack Waluska, Steve Gerrie and Brenda Howard of GLF. Believing that more people would turn out for the march on a Sunday, and so as to mark the date of the start of the Stonewall uprising, the committee scheduled the date for the first march for Sunday, June 28, 1970. After Michael Kotis replaced Dick Leitsch as president of Mattachine NY in April 1970, the organization ceased its opposition to the march.

There was little open animosity, and some bystanders applauded when a tall, pretty girl carrying a sign "I am a Lesbian" walked by. – The New York Times coverage of Gay Liberation Day, 1970

Christopher Street Liberation Day, on June 28, 1970, marked the first anniversary of the Stonewall riots with a march from Sheridan Square, covering the 51 blocks to the Sheep Meadow in Central Park. The march took less than half the scheduled time due to excitement and wariness about walking through the city with gay banners and signs. Although the parade permit was delivered only two hours before the start of the march, participants encountered little resistance from onlookers. The New York Times reported that the march extended for about 15 city blocks. Reporting by The Village Voice was positive, describing "the out-front resistance that grew out of the police raid on the Stonewall Inn one year ago". There was also an assembly on Christopher Street.

== Organizers ==
The first March in 1970 was organized by the Christopher Street Liberation Day Committee. Since 1984, the parade and related LGBT pride events in New York City have been produced and organized by Heritage of Pride (HOP), a volunteer-spearheaded, non-partisan, tax-exempt, non-profit organization. HOP welcomes participation regardless of age, creed, gender, gender identification, HIV status, national origin, physical, mental or developmental ability, race, or religion. HOP does not use qualifiers for participation.

In 2021, NYC Pride organizers announced that uniformed law enforcement would be banned from marching in the parade until 2025, when the ban was planned to be reexamined by committees and the executive board of NYC Pride.

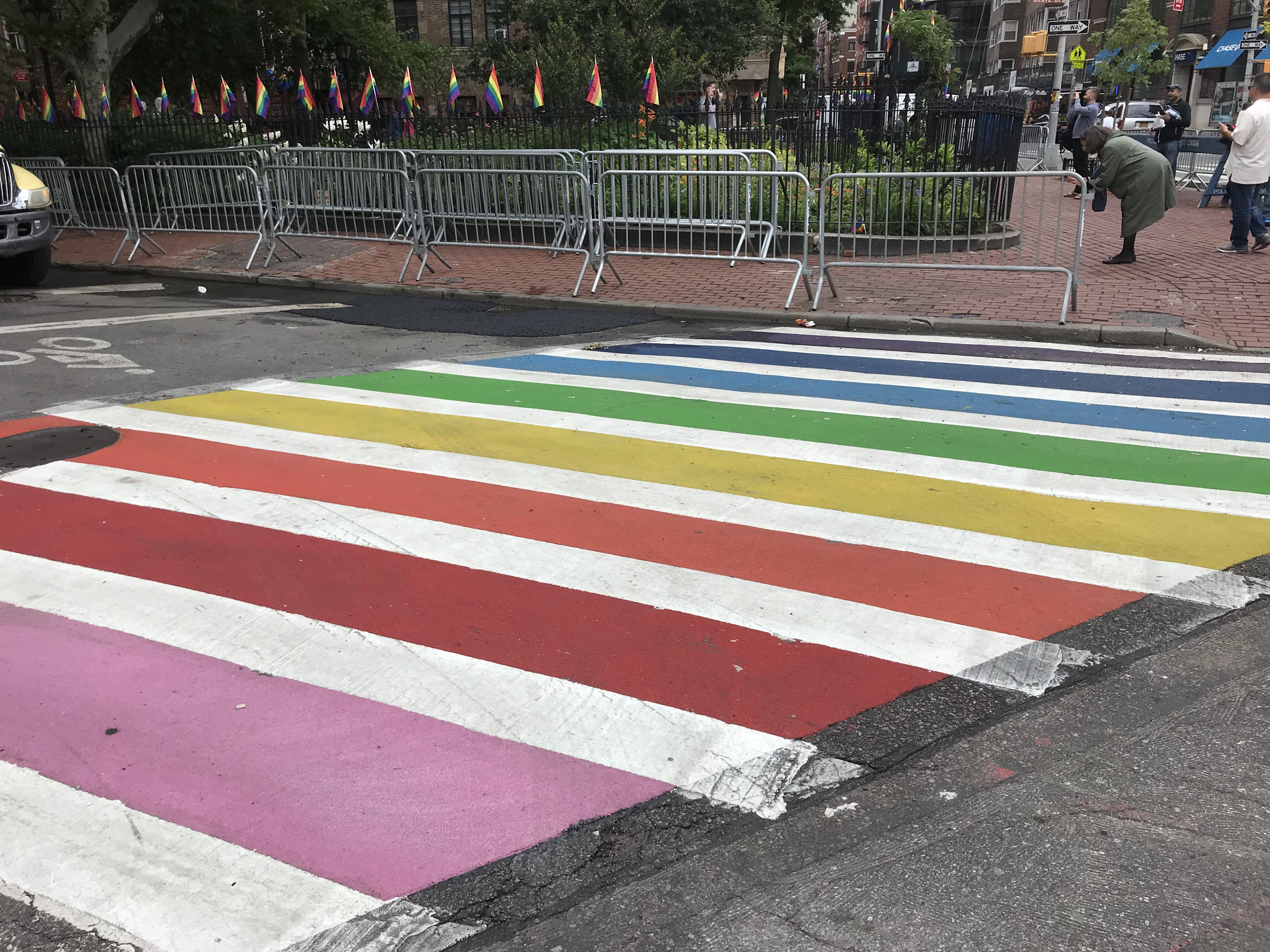
Rainbow striped crosswalk at the corner of 7th Ave. and Christopher St.

== Broadcast ==
For many years, the march was only available locally to Time Warner Cable customers via its NY1 news channel. In 2017, WABC-TV broadcast the NYC LGBT Pride March live for the first time regionally, and made the stream available to all parts of the globe where such content is accessible. WABC-TV continues to broadcast the first three hours of each year's march, which has had an actual run time over nine hours in 2017 and 2018. Both the 2017 and 2018 broadcasts were Emmy nominated programs. In 2022, the WABC-TV broadcast was also available via streaming from ABC News Live and Hulu.

== Schisms ==
Over the course of five decades, various groups have accused the NYC Pride March of losing its political, activist roots and becoming a venue for corporate pinkwashing, rainbow capitalism, and assimilation of queer identities. Such critiques have given rise to various independent events conducted without permits or police. The NYC Dyke March has been held annually on the Saturday prior since 1993, and the New York City Drag March has been held annually on the Friday prior since 1994. The latter began as a protest against the ban on leather and drag during the 25th anniversary of Stonewall. Coinciding with the 50th anniversary of Stonewall in 2019, the Reclaim Pride Coalition organized the first Queer Liberation March, held on Sunday morning, hours before the NYC Pride parade.

== Size ==
The first march in 1970 was front-page news in The New York Times, which reported that the march extended for about fifteen city blocks. The march had thousands of participants with organizers "who said variously 3,000 and 5,000 and even 20,000." Parade spectators were encouraged to join the procession despite the march starting with over a dozen homosexual and feminist contingents, which may partially explain the variance in population count. Heritage of Pride has since enacted stricter regulations to manage crowd size, requiring that marchers preregister and sets up barricades along the route.

Although estimating crowd size is an imprecise science, the NYC March is consistently considered the largest Pride parade in North America, with 2.1 million people in 2015, and 2.5 million in 2016. In 2018, attendance was estimated around two million. In 2024, the estimated crowd size was 2.5 million. In 2019, as part of Stonewall 50 – WorldPride NYC, an estimated 5 million people took part over the final weekend of the celebrations, with an estimated 4 million in attendance at the parade. The 12-hour parade included 150,000 pre-registered participants among 695 groups. It was the largest parade of any kind in the city's history and four times as large as the crowd of the annual Times Square Ball drop.

== NYC Pride March edition dates ==
=== 1981 and earlier ===
Edition	Date	Also known as	Theme
1st	June 28, 1970	NYC Pride March 1970	
2nd	June 27, 1971	NYC Pride March 1971	
3rd	June 25, 1972	NYC Pride March 1972	
4th	June 24, 1973	NYC Pride March 1973	
5th	June 30, 1974	NYC Pride March 1974	
6th	June 29, 1975	NYC Pride March 1975	
7th	June 27, 1976	NYC Pride March 1976	
8th	June 26, 1977	NYC Pride March 1977	
9th	June 25, 1978	NYC Pride March 1978	
10th	June 24, 1979	NYC Pride March 1979	
11th	June 29, 1980	NYC Pride March 1980	
12th	June 28, 1981	NYC Pride March 1981	

=== 1982–2019 ===
Edition	Date	Also known as	Theme
13th	June 27, 1982	NYC Pride March 1982	
14th	June 26, 1983	NYC Pride March 1983	
15th	June 24, 1984	NYC Pride March 1984	
16th	June 30, 1985	NYC Pride March 1985	
17th	June 29, 1986	NYC Pride March 1986	
18th	June 28, 1987	NYC Pride March 1987	
19th	June 26, 1988	NYC Pride March 1988	
20th	June 25, 1989	NYC Pride March 1989	
21st	June 24, 1990	NYC Pride March 1990	
22nd	June 30, 1991	NYC Pride March 1991	
23rd	June 28, 1992	NYC Pride March 1992	
24th	June 27, 1993	NYC Pride March 1993	
25th	June 26, 1994	NYC Pride March 1994	
26th	June 25, 1995	NYC Pride March 1995	
27th	June 30, 1996	NYC Pride March 1996	
28th	June 29, 1997	NYC Pride March 1997	
29th	June 28, 1998	NYC Pride March 1998	
30th	June 27, 1999	NYC Pride March 1999	
31st	June 25, 2000	NYC Pride March 2000	Take Pride, Take Joy, Take Action
32nd	June 24, 2001	NYC Pride March 2001	
33rd	June 30, 2002	NYC Pride March 2002	
34th	June 29, 2003	NYC Pride March 2003	
35th	June 27, 2004	NYC Pride March 2004	
36th	June 26, 2005	NYC Pride March 2005	
37th	June 25, 2006	NYC Pride March 2006	
38th	June 24, 2007	NYC Pride March 2007	
39th	June 29, 2008	NYC Pride March 2008	
40th	June 28, 2009	NYC Pride March 2009	
41st	June 27, 2010	NYC Pride March 2010	
42nd	June 26, 2011	NYC Pride March 2011	
43rd	June 24, 2012	NYC Pride March 2012	
44th	June 30, 2013	NYC Pride March 2013	
45th	June 29, 2014	NYC Pride March 2014	
46th	June 28, 2015	NYC Pride March 2015	
47th	June 26, 2016	NYC Pride March 2016	
48th	June 25, 2017	NYC Pride March 2017	
49th	June 24, 2018	NYC Pride March 2018	
50th	June 30, 2019	NYC Pride March 2019	

=== 2022 and later ===
Edition	Date	Also known as	Theme
53rd	June 26, 2022	NYC Pride March 2022	
54th	June 25, 2023	NYC Pride March 2023	
55th	June 30, 2024	NYC Pride March 2024	
56th	June 29, 2025	NYC Pride March 2025	"Rise Up: Pride in Protest"
57th	June 28, 2026	NYC Pride March 2026	"For All of Us"

== Grand marshals ==
=== 2026 ===
- Dominique Jackson, Peppermint, Bernie Wagenblast, Bowen Yang, and Gays Against Guns

=== 2025 ===
- Karine Jean-Pierre; Marti Gould Cummings; Trans Formative Schools; DJ Lina Bradford; and Elisa Crespo

=== 2024 ===
- Miss Major; Michelle Visage; Raquel Willis; and DaShawn Usher of GLAAD
- Youth Activist grand marshals: singer-songwriter Baddie Brooks, Hetrick-Martin Institute advocate Robin Drake, and content creator Eshe Ukweli

=== 2023 ===
- Billy Porter; Yasmin Benoit, the first openly asexual Grand Marshal; artist and educator AC Dumlao; Hope Giselle; and Randy Wicker

=== 2022 ===
- Ts Madison; Chase Strangio; Punkie Johnson; Schuyler Bailar; and Dominique Morgan of The Okra Project

=== 2021 ===
- The COVID-19 pandemic in New York City resulted in cancelation of the 2020 and 2021 events.

=== 2020 ===
- The COVID-19 pandemic in New York City resulted in cancelation of the 2020 and 2021 events.

=== 2019: Stonewall 50 ===
- Mj Rodriguez, Indya Moore, and Dominique Jackson from the cast of Pose; Phyll Opoku-Gyimah; Monica Helms, creator of the 1999 transgender pride flag; The Trevor Project; and the Gay Liberation Front

=== 2018 ===
- Billie Jean King; Lambda Legal; Tyler Ford; and Kenita Placide

=== 2017 ===
- American Civil Liberties Union; Brooke Guinan, the first openly transgender FDNY firefighter; Krishna Stone of Gay Men's Health Crisis; Geng Le, Chinese LGBT rights leader and founder of Blued

=== 2016 ===
- Jazz Jennings; Cecilia Chung; and Subhi Nahas, refugee and cofounder of the first LGBT magazine in Syria

=== 2015 ===
- Ian McKellen; Derek Jacobi; Kasha Jacqueline Nabagesera; and J. Christopher Neal, the first openly bisexual Grand Marshal

=== 2014 ===
- Laverne Cox; Jonathan Groff; and Rea Carey of the National Gay and Lesbian Task Force

=== 2013 ===
- Edith Windsor, plaintiff in United States v. Windsor, which struck down Section 3 of the Defense of Marriage Act; Earl Fowlkes; and Harry Belafonte

=== 2012 ===
- Cyndi Lauper; Chris Salgardo of Kiehl's; Connie Kopelov & Phyllis Siegel, New York City's first legally married same-sex couple

=== 2011 ===
- Dan Savage and Terry Miller, It Gets Better Project; Rev. Pat Bumgardner, Metropolitan Community Church of New York; and the Imperial Court of New York

=== 2010 ===
- Constance McMillen; Judy Shepard; and Lt. Dan Choi

=== 2009: Stonewall 40 ===
- Cleve Jones; Anne Kronenberg; and Dustin Lance Black

=== 2008 ===
- Gilbert Baker, creator of the Pride Flag; Candice Cayne; New York Governor David A. Paterson; New York Senator Charles Schumer; and NYC Mayor Mike Bloomberg

== See also ==
- LGBTQ culture in New York City
- List of largest LGBTQ events
- List of LGBTQ awareness days
- List of LGBTQ events
- List of LGBTQ people from New York City
- Queens Liberation Front
- Queens Pride Parade
- St. Pat's for All
- Timeline of LGBTQ history in New York City
