= Night pride =

Night Pride
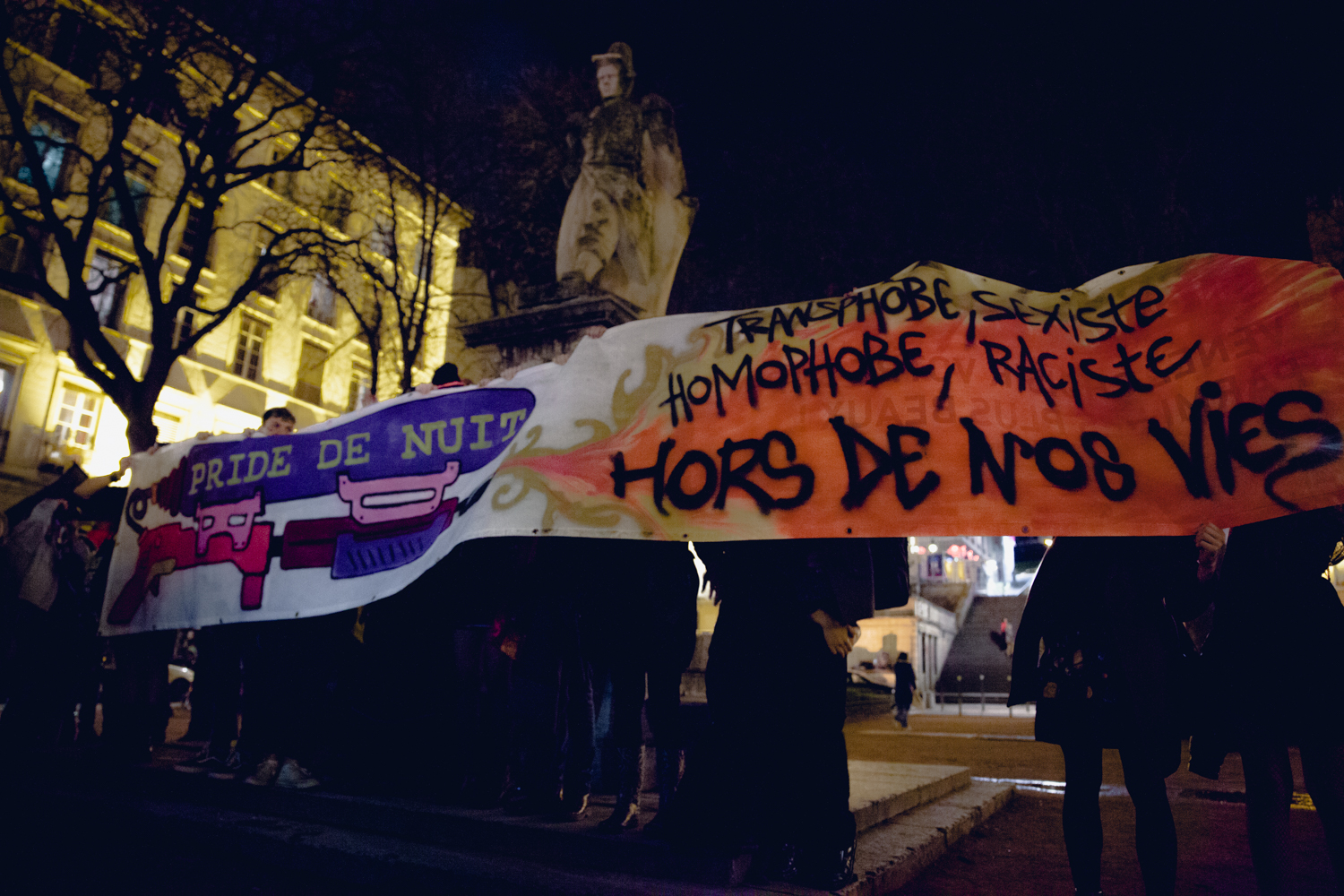
- Native name: Pride de nuit
- Location: France
- Type: Demonstration

Night prides (French: prides de nuit) are protest demonstrations of LGBTI people alternative to the Pride marches, which are considered depoliticized.

The movement was launched by ACT UP, OUTrans, Femmes en Lutte 93 and other associations in Paris in 2015, opposing what they perceived as a depoliticization of Pride marches and their loss of autonomy against public powers and pink capitalism.

In Paris, two other editions were organized in 2016 and 2017, although in 2018 they decided not to summon a fourth protest in order to avoid converting it in a symbolic institutionalized event that would not lead to do other actions. However, since 2016 the movement were already extended to other French cities, such as Toulouse, Lyon or Nice.

There are similar actions in other countries too, specially in the context of the movement Gay Shame.

== See also ==
- Front homosexuel d'action révolutionnaire
- Critical pride
- Gay Shame
- Pink capitalism
