= Stonewall 50 – WorldPride NYC 2019 =

2019 LGBTQ International Pride events in New York City

- Date: June 2019
- Location: New York City and worldwide
- Participants: Lesbian, gay, bisexual, transgender, and queer (LGBTQ) rights activists and supporters
- Website: 2019-worldpride-stonewall50.nycpride.org

Stonewall 50 – WorldPride NYC 2019 was a series of LGBTQ events and celebrations in June 2019, marking the 50th anniversary of the 1969 Stonewall riots. It was also the first time WorldPride was held in the United States. Held primarily in the metropolitan New York City area, the theme for the celebrations and educational events was "Millions of moments of Pride." The celebration was the largest LGBTQ event in history, with an official estimate of 5 million attending Pride weekend in Manhattan alone, with an estimated 4 million in attendance at the NYC Pride March. The twelve-hour parade included 150,000 pre-registered participants among 695 groups.

== Background ==
=== Namesake ===
The Stonewall Uprising of June 1969 was a series of spontaneous, violent demonstrations by members of the gay (LGBTQ) community in Greenwich Village, New York City. Patrons of the Stonewall Inn, gay street kids from the surrounding area, and members of the community who came from neighboring gay and lesbian bars, fought back against an early morning police raid, refusing to be arrested for simply patronizing a gay bar and being out in public. The Stonewall riots are widely considered to be the most important event leading to the gay liberation movement and the modern fight for LGBT rights in the United States.

=== 50th anniversary ===
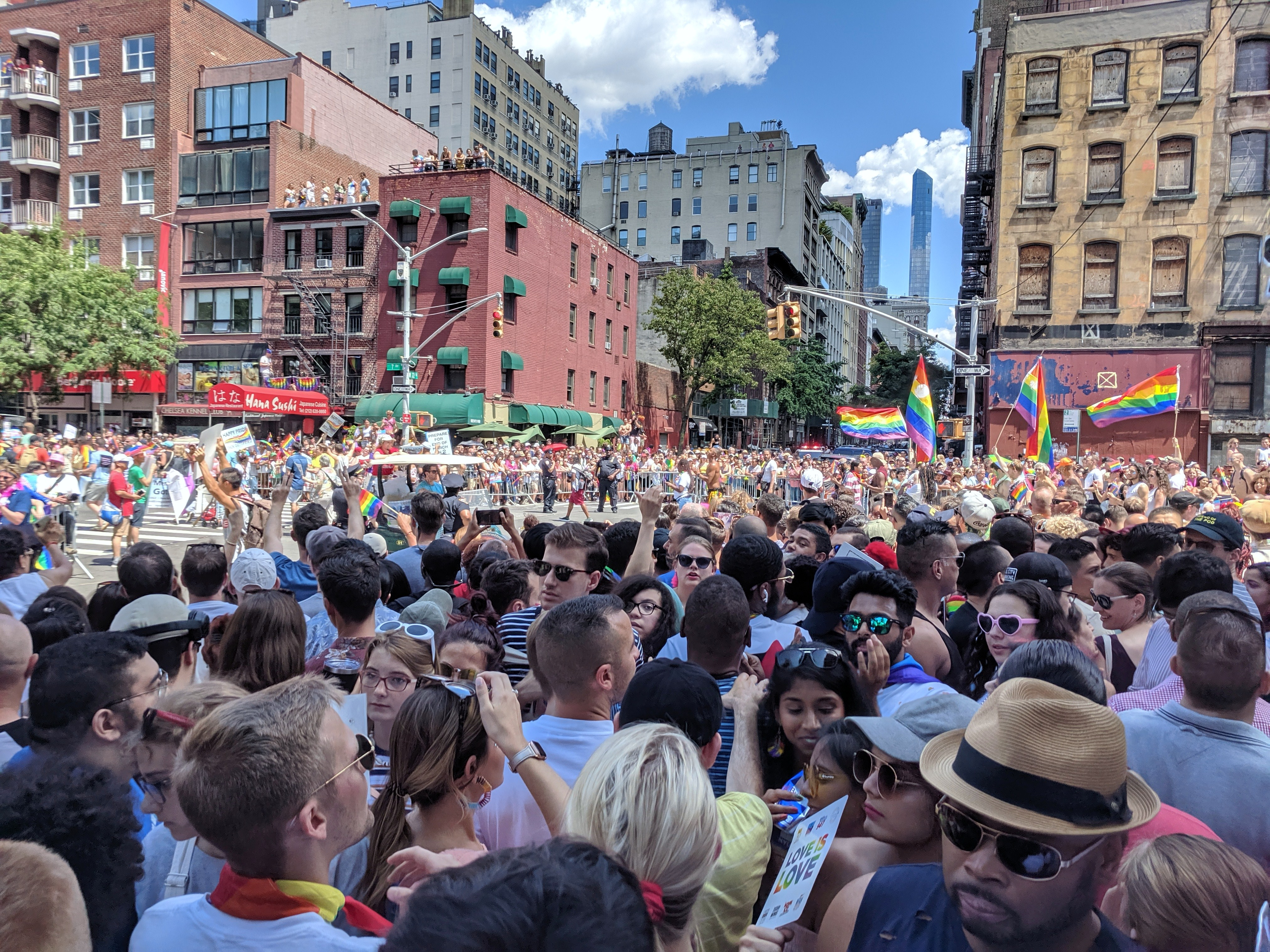
An estimated 5 million people attended Stonewall 50 – WorldPride NYC 2019.

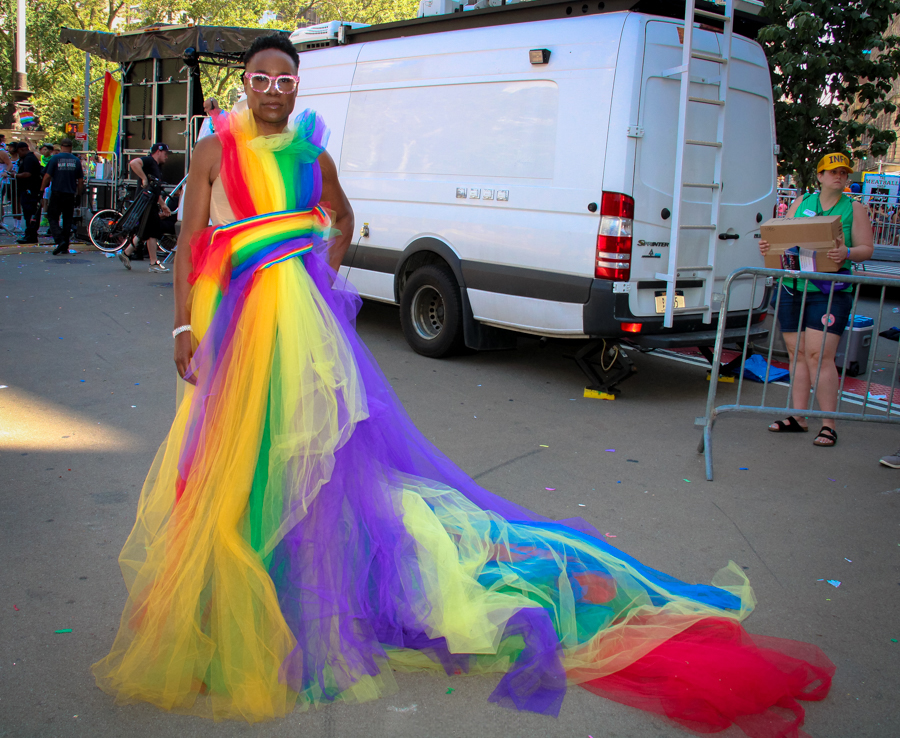
Actor Billy Porter at Stonewall 50 – WorldPride NYC 2019, rainbow gown by Christian Siriano

The Stonewall 50 - WorldPride events were held throughout June, which is traditionally Pride month in New York City and worldwide, under the auspices of the annual NYC Pride March. The events represented the largest LGBTQ celebration in history. Produced by Heritage of Pride (HOP), they commemorated the 50th anniversary of the Stonewall uprising. Organizers and city authorities estimated 150,000 parade marchers, and five million visitors attending Pride weekend in Manhattan alone.

HOP's Stonewall 50 Planning Committee began work in July, 2009. Additional programming was envisioned for the coming years and by 2011 new events had become a reality. This would eventually lead to a successful bid for the first US hosted WorldPride.

=== WorldPride ===
The concept for WorldPride events were established in 1997 when Heritage of Pride hosted the 16th annual conference of InterPride. WorldPride, licensed by InterPride and organized by one of its members, is an event that promotes LGBTQ pride issues on an international level through parades, festivals and other cultural activities. The inaugural WorldPride was held in Rome in 2000. The host cities are selected by InterPride, an international association of pride coordinators, at its annual general meeting.

== Events ==
=== Started before June ===
- Through Jan. 5, 2020, 'Implicit Tensions: Mapplethorpe Now', at Solomon R. Guggenheim Museum.
- Through November, "PRIDE", at Museum of the City of New York.
- Through June 27, Drag Brunch, at Oscar Wilde NYC, weekend drag brunches benefiting The Trevor Project.
- Through Aug. 4, 'On the (Queer) Waterfront', at Brooklyn Historical Society.
- Through Sept. 15, "Walt Whitman: Bard of Democracy", at The Morgan Library & Museum.
- Through Sept. 22, Stonewall 50 Exhibitions, at New-York Historical Society, in Manhattan.
- Through July 14, 'Love & Resistance: Stonewall 50', at New York Public Library, Bryant Park.
- Through Dec. 8, 'Nobody Promised You Tomorrow: Art 50 Years After Stonewall', at Brooklyn Museum.
- Through July 20, "Art After Stonewall, 1969–1989", at NYU's Grey Art Gallery, and at Leslie-Lohman Museum of Gay and Lesbian Art, both in Manhattan.
- Through September 27, Queer History Walks, at The Whitney, walking tours of LGBTQ history in the Meatpacking District.

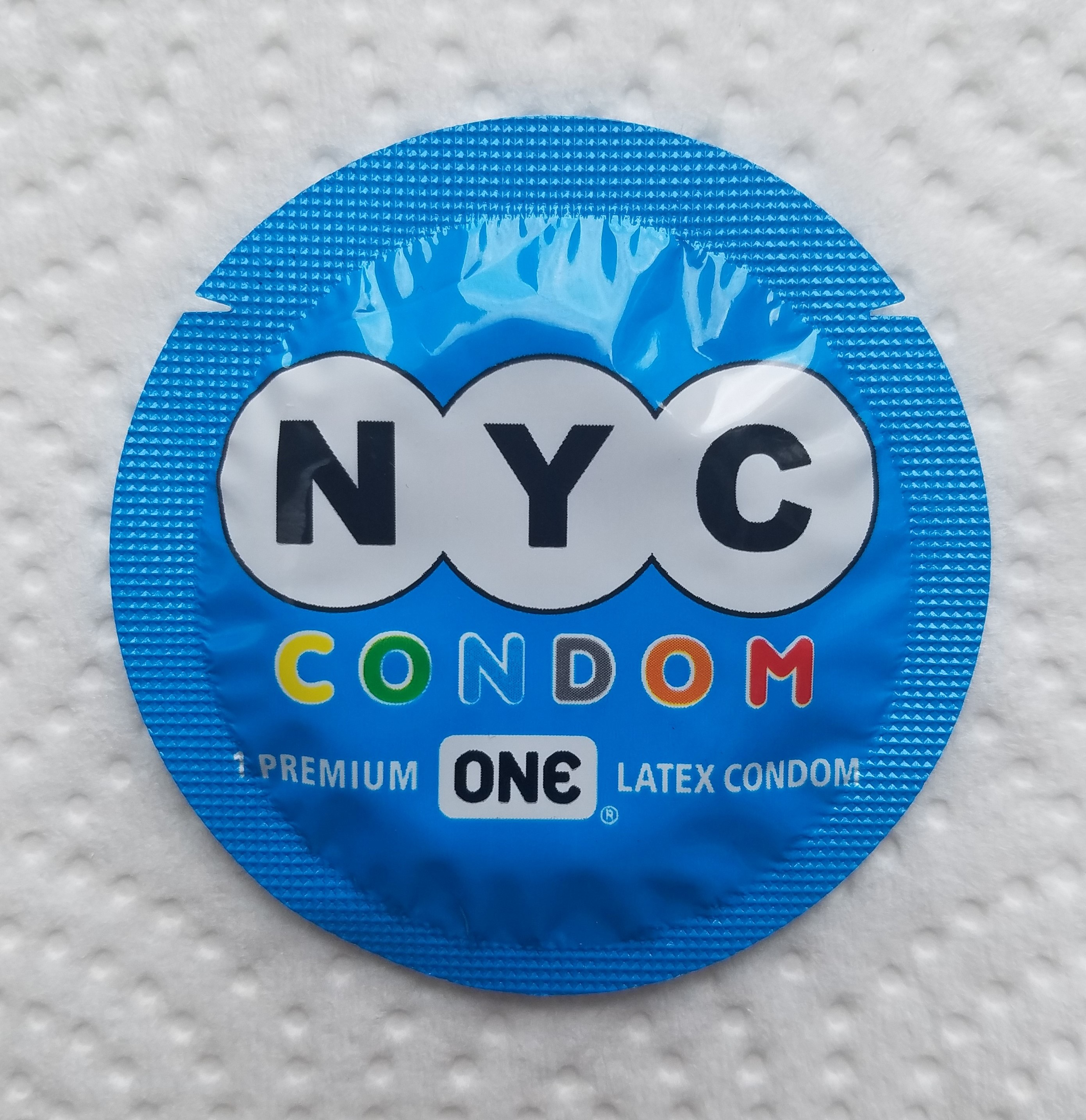
A condom given out by NYC Health Department during the Stonewall 50 – WorldPride NYC 2019 celebrations.

- Starting in mid-May, and being unveiled through June, NYC Pride March presents the World Mural Project, fifty murals throughout New York City's five boroughs that "speak to the lived LGBTQ+ experience."
- The Stonewall Operas, a series of four mini-operas which had their world premiere in May 2019 at New York University's Shubert Theatre and the Stonewall Inn.
- May 30, Queens Pride's LGBTQ Youth Prom takes place at New York Hall of Science for LGBTQ youth 14 to 20 years old.

=== Early June ===
- June 2, Queens Pride Parade and Festival headlined by Kristine W and Dominique Jackson of "Pose."
- June 6, Portraits of Pride, at The Museum of the City of New York, films about Stormé DeLarverie and Marsha P. Johnson.
- June 9, 5K Brooklyn Pride Run, though Prospect Park.
- The Costume Institute's Camp: Notes on Fashion exhibit at the Metropolitan Museum of Art (The Met), through Sept. 8, has a related event on June 11, a "Battle of the Legends" vogueing competition.
- June 13, 'Love & Lipliner' drag queen tutorial and makeovers, at The James New York - NoMad.
- June 14–17, Come Back Once More So I Can Say Goodbye, at The Alvin Ailey American Dance Theater, performances telling the story of the NYC gay community between 1965 and 1995.
- June 14–30, "Ascend With Pride", the world's largest rainbow flag installed on the 12-foot-by-100-foot staircase of Roosevelt Island's Franklin D. Roosevelt Four Freedoms Park.
- June 15 "The Ambisextrous" series debut and artist Lex Barberio's first solo exhibition
- June 17, Queer & Now at Delacorte Theater, with Trevor Bachman, Kate Bornstein, Lea DeLaria, Ryan J. Haddad, the Jerriese Johnson Gospel Choir, Erin Markey, Darnell Moore, Peppermint, Toshi Reagon, Conrad Ricamora, Aneesh Sheth, Chase Strangio.
- June 15, Spill the Tea discussion, at Harlem Stage Gatehouse with E. Patrick Johnson discussing oral histories from Sweet Tea: Gay Black Men of the South (2008), which focuses on southern, Black gay men.
- June 16, Broadway Bares, at the Hammerstein Ballroom benefiting Broadway Cares/Equity Fights AIDS.
- June 17–19, NYC Pride, with NewFest and SVA Theatre, presents OutCinema, film screenings and talks.
- June 19-July 6, The Golden Girls Musical Parody: PRIDE is presented at HERE.

=== Pride week ===
- June 20–23, Folsom Street East Festival, four-day fetish festival in Chelsea.
- June 21–28, Stonewall, New York City Opera's first-ever commissioned work, debuts.
- June 21, Family Movie Night, hosted by Heritage of Pride on Pier 45 in Hudson River Park.
- June 21, The Library After Hours: Pride, Love & Resistance: Stonewall 50, including Drag Queen Story Hour, at Stephen A. Schwarzman Building.
- June 21, Cosplay & Pride, cosplay party hosted by NYC Pride with Geeks OUT.
- June 21–23, Pride at the Beach, a "destination weekend" including Long Island Pride Parade.
- June 23, Pride Luminaries Brunch, hosted by NYC Pride and the National LGBT Chamber of Commerce at Magic Hour (Moxie Hotel).
- June 23, "#howaboutlove: 50 Years of DIVAS" pays tribute to 50 years of divas who provided the soundtrack to the worldwide pride movement.
- June 24, Garden Party, culinary event on Pier 97 benefiting The NYC LGBT Center.
- June 24–25, Human Rights Conference, at New York Law School in Tribeca.
- June 26, the opening ceremony for NYC Pride takes place at Brooklyn's Barclays Center, with headliners Ciara, Chaka Khan, Cyndi Lauper, Billy Porter, and Whoopi Goldberg, Todrick Hall.
- June 26, LBTQWomen hosts its first annual conference: Connect, Champion, and Celebrate, at Microsoft Conference Center on Times Square.
- June 27, National LGBTQ Wall of Honor, is unveiled at the Stonewall Inn.
- June 27, Solidarity: Hustlaball WorldPride, part one of three for the Solidarity party Pride series is gay dance party Hustlaball, at Brooklyn's 3 Dollar Bill.

=== Pride weekend ===
- June 28–30, LadyLand Festival, at Brooklyn Mirage, queer music festival, with dozens of acts including Gossip, and Pussy Riot.
- June 28, Stonewall 50 Commemoration, in Christopher Park outside the Stonewall Inn with several speakers like Mayor Bill De Blasio, Senator Kirsten Gillibrand, activists Emma González and Rémy Bonny.
- June 28, Savor Pride, an "immersive culinary fundraiser" benefiting God's Love We Deliver, which delivers meals to people living with HIV/AIDS and other serious illnesses, on the terraces of the non-profit's Midtown headquarters.
- June 28, the Trans Day of Action, a rally and march for gender liberation, starts in Washington Square Park.
- June 28, the New York City Drag March goes from Tompkins Square Park to Sheridan Square.
- June 28, Forever Tel Aviv: OneWorld Opening, at Hammerstein Ballroom.
- June 28, Solidarity: DIES3L Main Event, world's largest muscle-bear event at Webster Hall.

Sailing vessel flies the rainbow pride flag past One World Trade Center in New York City during the Stonewall 50 – WorldPride NYC 2019 celebrations.

- June 29, Live Jazz Pride Brunch with Live Out Loud, Brunch For Benefits, at Ortzi NYC inside the LUMA Hotel Times Square.
- June 29, Central Park's SummerStage hosts a YouthPride festival for young people under 21 years old.
- June 29, The New York City Dyke March takes place in the streets between Bryant Park and Washington Square Park.
- June 29, "Hot Rabbit: Bad Habit", benefits the NYC Dyke March, at Bushwick's Lot 49.
- June 29, USS Masterbeat: Oneworld Daytime, part two of the OneWorld series at Terminal 5.
- June 29, Brooklyn Ultra Day Party, at The Brooklyn Warehouse.
- June 29, TEAZE, an inclusive queer benefit party, at The DL on the Lower East Side.
- June 29, VIP Rooftop, rooftop party benefit at Hudson Terrace.
- June 29, Solidarity: BRÜT WorldPride, the last of the trio of Solidarity WorldPride's parties is also NYC's largest underground leather/fetish events of the year, at PlayStation Theatre in Times Square.

=== Pride day ===
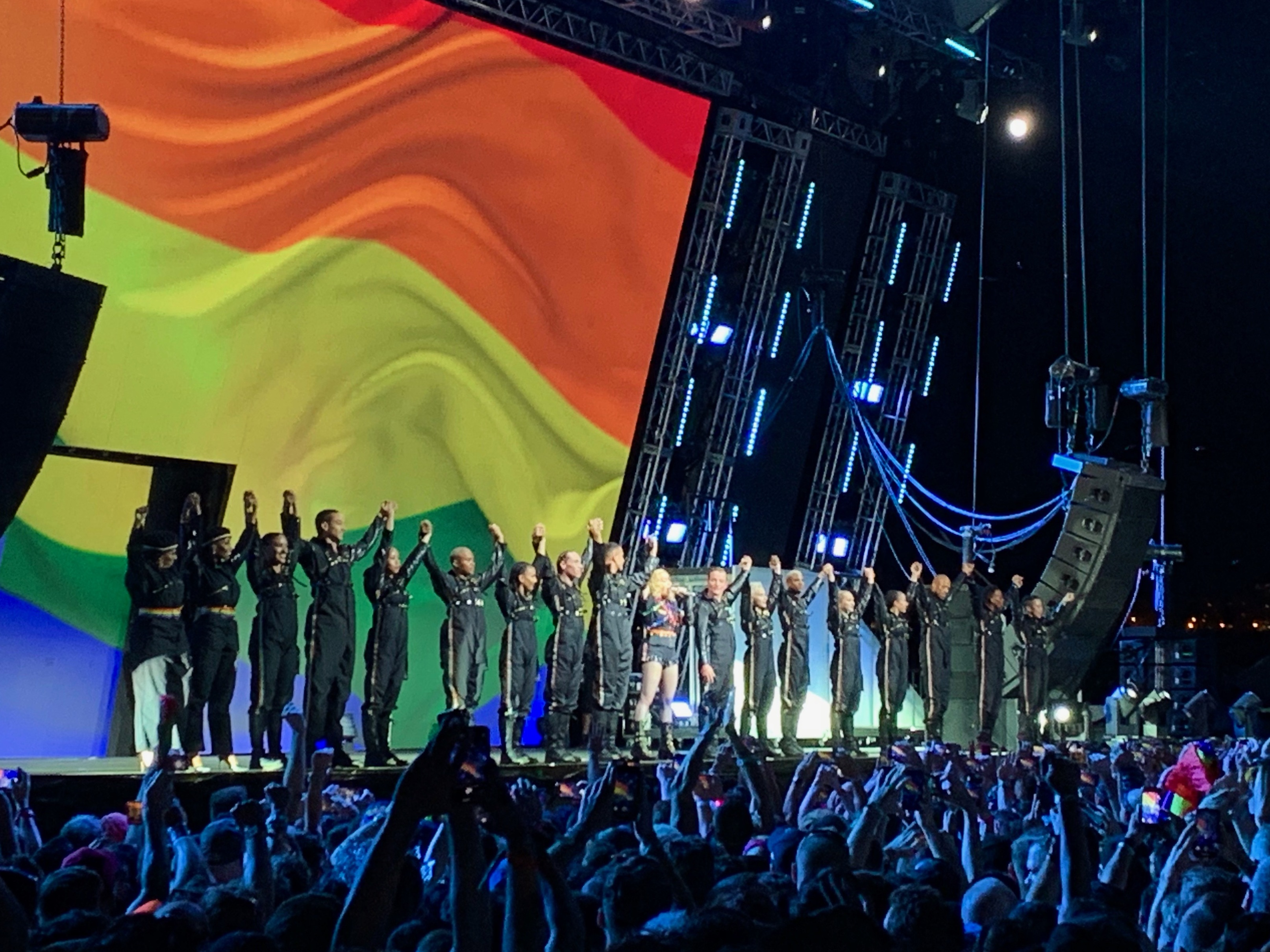
Madonna's performance.

- June 29–30. Pride Island on Pier 97 in Hell's Kitchen, with Madonna, Grace Jones, Teyana Taylor, Pabllo Vittar, Amara La Negra, and Johnny Dynell.
- June 30, NYC Pride March goes down Fifth Avenue, through the Village, and then up Seventh Avenue into Chelsea.
- June 30, Reclaim Pride Coalition organized the Queer Liberation March, up Sixth Avenue ending at the Great Lawn in Central Park.
- June 30, WorldPride Closing Ceremony in Times Square with headliners include Melissa Etheridge.
- June 30, Alegria outdoor spectacular and all-night dancing at Brooklyn Mirage open-air venue.
- June 30, Femme Fatale, the official rooftop party for women at Hudson Terrace.
- June 30, Matinee Pervert: OneWorld Closing, at Terminal.

== See also ==
- LGBT culture in New York City
