= List of LGBTQ social networking services =

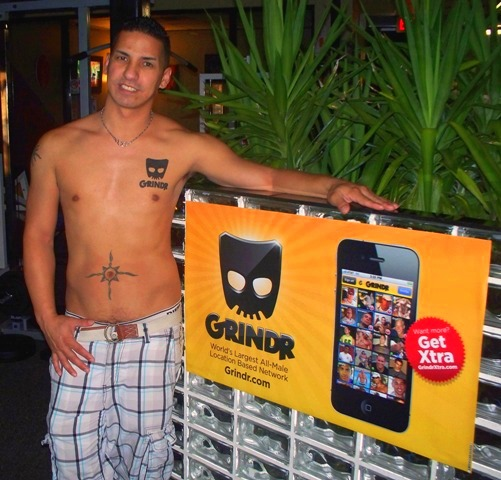
Scene from a Grindr Party @ Midtowne

There are a variety of LGBT social networking services. Grindr is the largest and best-known gay mobile app, and was one of the first when it launched in March 2009.

- Adam4Adam
- Atraf
- Blued
- Delta App
- dudesnude
- Fridae
- Gabile.com
- Gaydar
- Gays.com
- GaySurfers.net
- Grindr
- GuySpy
- Her
- Hornet
- Jack'd
- Manhunt
- Recon
- Romeo
- Scruff
- Sniffies
- Squirt.org
- Taimi

== Defunct ==
- Chappy
- Compatible Partners
- DBNA
- Gay.com
- Gingerbeer
- Manjam.com
- OUTeverywhere
- Trevvy

== See also ==
- LGBTQ dating
