= LGBTQ dating =

LGBTQ dating has some distinct characteristics when compared to heterosexual relationships.

In 2019, Serena Sonoma of Teen Vogue wrote, "Dating advice is largely focused on cisheteronormative society, which erases the experiences that non-binary people face in romance. Whether it's dating apps that lack appropriate gender options, transphobic partners who don't validate your identity, or misgendering based on appearance, there can be a lot of obstacles for nonbinary people who aren't recognized by cisgender people."

There have been LGBTQ speed dating events and TikTok shows.

Body dysmorphic disorder and eating disorders in the LGBTQ community can be fueled by dating apps and social media. Some apps have taken measures to reduce or ban body shaming, as well as homophobic and transphobic language.

== Culture ==
=== Apps and websites ===
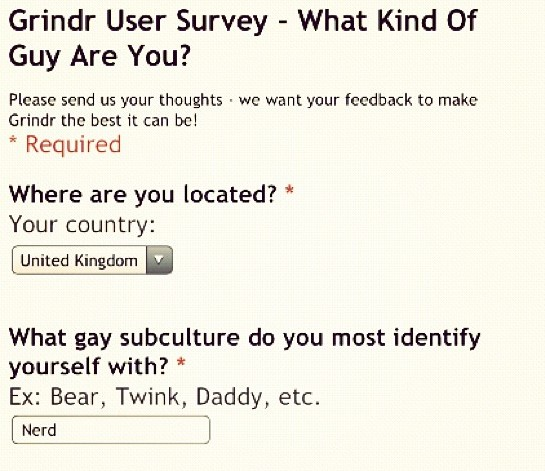
A visual of a Grindr survey asking users what subculture they identify with, giving bear, daddy, and twink as examples.

In 2022, a writer for The Hindu said the LGBTQ community "has a love-hate relationship with dating apps". Dating apps have reduced the need for people to go to gay bars and other LGBTQ establishments.

LGBTQ dating apps include Blued and Grindr. In 2019, Tim Fitzsimons of NBC News wrote, "Historically, Grindr was the first iPhone app to combine dating — and sex — with geolocation, birthing a genre that today includes favorites like Tinder and Bumble, which are popular with the larger heterosexual user base." Blued and Finka were banned in China in 2025. Blued and Grindr were banned in Malaysia in 2026. LGBTQ dating websites have included Gaydar and Manhunt. The gay dating app Squirt has been described as a "rehash" of a former gay cruising website.

Her is a lesbian dating app. Hanky is an invite-only dating app for gay and bisexual men. The app Bumble has banned homophobic and transphobic language. The transgender dating app Butterfly corrects transphobic language automatically.

=== Film ===
The film Old Guys in Bed is about gay men over the age of 60 exploring dating and sex.

=== Television ===
LGBTQ dating television shows have included A Shot at Love with Tila Tequila, Alphabet Soup, I Kissed a Boy, The Boyfriend, The Ultimatum: Queer Love, and Stand Bi Me.

== See also ==
- Homosocialization
- List of LGBTQ social networking services
