= Fitlads =

Social networking site for men seeking men

Fitlads was a social networking, dating/hookup website and app for gay and bisexual men in the United Kingdom. It was launched in April 2003, and introduced video to the app in 2008.

The website was geared towards stereotypical "straight-acting" working-class "chav" or "scally"-type "lads", as well as those with a fetish for sports kits or bondage. It had a rating system for videos, which was seen by scholar David G. Kreps as communicating more "about sex ... than it is about sex itself".

Between 2014 and 2015, the website was one of those used by the serial killer Stephen Port as a means of initially contacting his victims. He also maintained accounts on Sleepyboy, Grindr, Hornet, Badoo, Gaydar, Flirt, DaddyHunt, PlanetRomeo, Manhunt, Slaveboys and CouchSurfing.

== Closure ==
The parent-company behind Fitlads, "FL ONLINE LIMITED", was dissolved on 24 November 2020, and the fitlads.net website no-longer loads.

The final-capture made of the fitlads.net homepage by the Wayback Machine was on 10 August 2020, with new.fitlads.net (a sub-domain where users would log into the site) last-captured on 15 February 2020, suggesting the site went offline sometime in 2020.
