= Stephen Port =

English serial killer (born 1975)

- Born: 22 February 1975 (age 51); Southend-on-Sea, Essex, England
- Other name: The Grindr Killer
- Status: Incarcerated
- Penalty: Life imprisonment (whole life order)

Details
- Victims: 4 (murder); 11+ (rape)
- Span of crimes: 2014–2015
- Country: United Kingdom
- Date apprehended: 2015
- Imprisoned at: HMP Belmarsh

Stephen John Port (born 22 February 1975) is an English serial killer and serial rapist. He has been convicted of the murders of four young men and multiple rapes and sexual assaults of several others. Port received a sentence of life imprisonment with a whole life order on 25 November 2016.

== Early life ==
Port was born in Southend-on-Sea, Essex. When he was a year old, his family moved to Dagenham in East London, where he grew up and where his parents still live. He was described as being a "loner" and was often bullied at school during his childhood. Former teachers also described Port's personality as "quiet". His neighbour described him as having a peculiar, childlike personality, exhibiting odd behaviour as a grown man, such as playing with children's toys. After leaving school, aged 16, he went to art college, but it proved too expensive for his parents and he spent two years training as a chef instead. A former romantic partner of Port's described his personality as childish and gave that as the reason for ending their relationship. He came out as gay in his mid-twenties.

Port lived with his parents until his early thirties, then lived alone in a flat in Barking, London, and worked as a chef at a Stagecoach bus depot in West Ham. Port also briefly appeared on an episode of the television show MasterChef. He was described as having an athletic appearance at the time of the murders due to regularly going to the gym. He was bald and disguised this in public by wearing a blond toupée. The hairpiece was professionally fastened and increased his confidence when meeting other men.

== Victims ==
Port met his victims via online gay and bisexual social networks and dating or hookup apps, and constructed biographies in which he made false claims about his background, including one in which he pretended to have graduated from Oxford University and served in the Royal Navy. In another, he gave his occupation as a special needs teacher. Port used gamma-hydroxybutyric acid (GHB), a date rape drug, adding it to drinks given to his victims, raping them, and murdering four of them in his flat in Barking. The prosecution said that Port himself used a range of drugs, including amyl nitrite (poppers), Viagra, mephedrone, crystal methamphetamine, and GHB or GBL in its liquid form, but GHB was what he used to ply his victims: "postmortem examinations on the four young men who died revealed that each had died from a drug overdose featuring high levels of GHB".

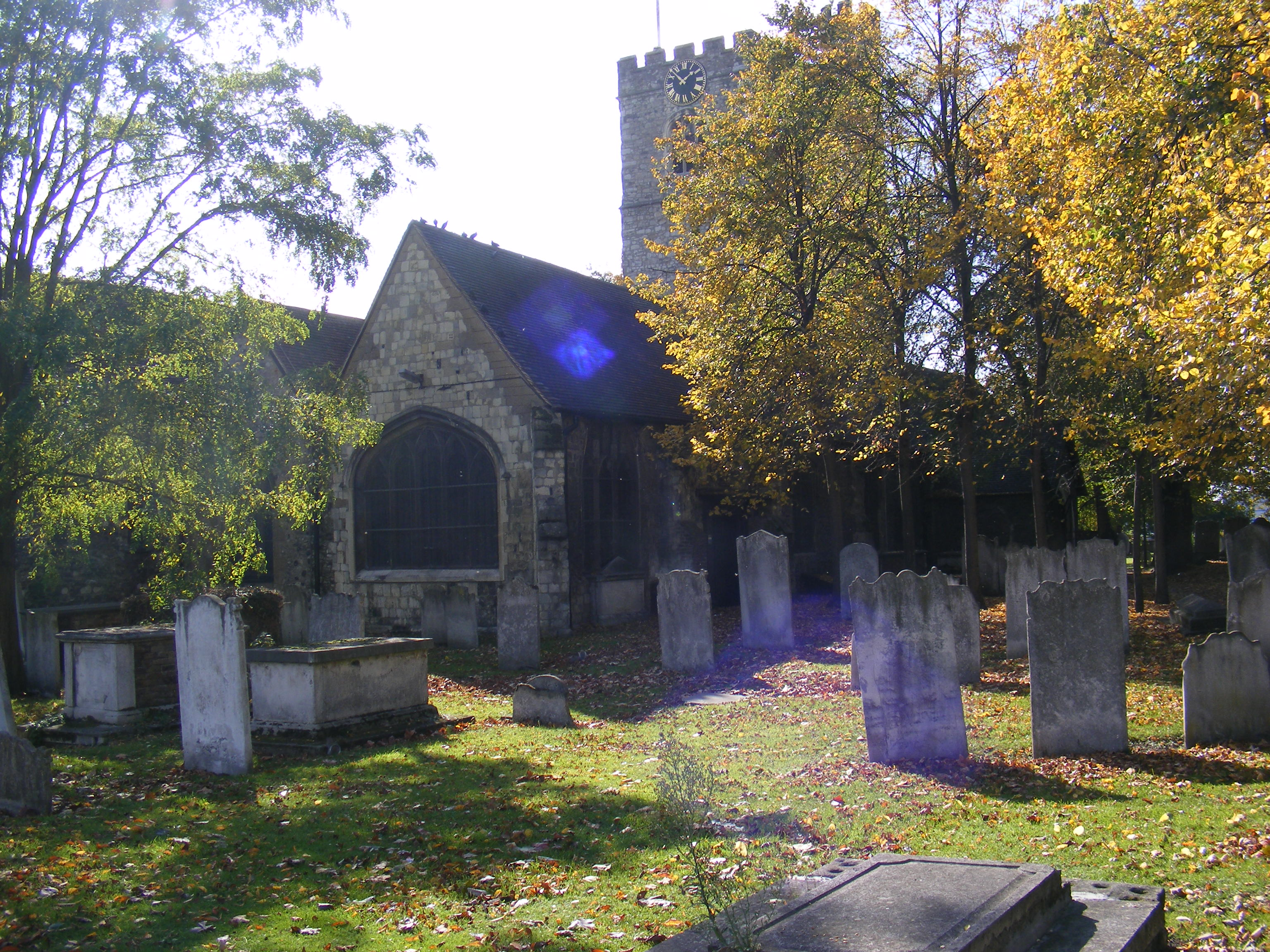
The graveyard of St Margaret's Church, Barking: the bodies of three of the four murder victims were found here.

Port contacted his first murder victim, 23-year-old Anthony Walgate, a fashion student who occasionally worked as an escort, on 17 June 2014 pretending to be a client. At Port's flat, Walgate was drugged with GHB and raped; he died after Port gave him a fatal overdose of the drug. The next day, Port placed Walgate's body outside the flat and made an anonymous call for an ambulance. Shortly before 8:00 a.m., Walgate was pronounced dead. Evidence linking Port to Walgate's death was missed at this time. Port was convicted of perverting the course of justice in March 2015 because his account of the death to the police varied. He was sentenced to eight months but was released in June and was electronically tagged.

Between August 2014 and September 2015, Port murdered three more men: Gabriel Kovari, 22, who had moved to London from Slovakia and had briefly lived with Port, Daniel Whitworth, 21, from Gravesend in Kent, who worked as a chef, and Jack Taylor, 25, who lived with his parents in Dagenham and worked as a forklift truck driver. The bodies of the second and third victims were found in the graveyard of the church of St Margaret of Antioch in Barking, by the same woman on separate occasions walking her dog; the last victim was found in the park adjacent to the graveyard. Port had planted a fake suicide note alongside the body of Whitworth that suggested he was responsible for the death of Kovari, the previous victim, and that he had killed himself out of guilt.

Port used a number of Internet hook-up sites and apps as a means of initially contacting his victims, including Sleepyboy, Grindr, Hornet, Fitlads, Badoo, Gaydar, Flirt, DaddyHunt, PlanetRomeo, Manhunt, Slaveboys and CouchSurfing.

The families of Port's victims were given compensation by the Metropolitan Police over their handling of the investigation into the killings. The Independent Office for Police Conduct (IOPC) re-investigated the Met over its initial handling of their cases.

== Inquests ==
The original inquests into the deaths returned open verdicts. Coroner Nadia Persaud said she had "some concerns surrounding Whitworth's death which have not been answered by the police investigation". Her statement continued: "most concerning are the findings by the pathologist of manual handling prior to his death" and noted that "the bed sheet that he was found wrapped in was not forensically analysed, and the bottle of GBL which was found near him was also not tested for fingerprints or DNA". A detective was asked why the bed sheet had not been tested.

== Conviction and life sentence ==
In 2015, Port was charged with four counts of murder and four of administering poison. At the Old Bailey in June 2016, prosecutors added six more counts of administering a poison, seven charges of rape and four of sexual assault. He also faced four alternative charges of manslaughter. Port appeared via video link from HM Prison Belmarsh and denied all charges.

On 23 November 2016, Port was convicted of the murders, assaults by penetration, and rapes of Anthony Walgate, 23, Gabriel Kovari, 22, Daniel Whitworth, 21, and Jack Taylor, 25, as well as rapes of three other men he drugged, and ten counts of administering a substance with intent, and four sexual assaults. He was found guilty on all counts. In total, 11 men were known victims of Port's crimes.

Commenting on the case, Malcolm McHaffie, Deputy Chief Crown Prosecutor for CPS London, said:

Over a period of three years the defendant committed a series of murders and serious sexual offences against young men. Port manipulated and controlled these men through the chilling and calculated use of the drug GHB, which he administered without their permission ... This was a technically challenging case, complicated by a significant amount of evidence taken from the numerous social media sites Port used.

At the Old Bailey on 25 November 2016, Mr Justice Openshaw sentenced Port to life imprisonment with a whole life order. Port is incarcerated in HM Prison Belmarsh in Thamesmead, south London.

== Questions about the police investigation ==
The bodies of the four men were found in the vicinity of Port's flat, in a period of just over a year, from June 2014: Walgate (the first) outside his front door and the other three in or near a nearby graveyard. The Metropolitan Police, however, failed to link the deaths. The first three victims were initially thought not to have died in suspicious circumstances and, despite the PinkNews website and the force's LGBT independent advisory group correctly believing there was a serial murderer at large, the police had told them the crimes were not linked.

A BBC One documentary broadcast in March 2017 suggested a "catalogue of police failings" in the Met's response to the deaths. Crucial witnesses were not questioned; for example, Port's neighbour who had witnessed Port in a dazed state, with a large container full of white powder and bottles of clear liquid, when he made an unexpected visit to his home and also reported receiving suspicious text messages from Port regarding Kovari.

Kovari's previous landlord, John Pape, searched on the internet for other unexplained deaths in the Barking area, and was astonished at the similarities in the case of Anthony Walgate, especially the locations in which the bodies were found; however, Barking & Dagenham Police did not link the two cases. Upon learning of Whitworth's death, he called the detective at Barking & Dagenham Police and demanded to know whether they thought the now three cases were linked or could be murder, as he was concerned for his own personal safety; he was assured that they were not linked and not being investigated as suspicious. He also offered to be interviewed since he felt he might have relevant information regarding Kovari's last movements, but no one contacted him in response, even after he had organisations such as PinkNews contact the police on his behalf. The woman who found Kovari's body and found Whitworth's body two weeks later in the same location and almost exactly the same position also reported thinking that Barking & Dagenham Police "had no idea what they were doing" not to connect the two cases.

Whitworth's step-mother says that when police informed her of his death, they led her to believe he had overdosed on drugs, despite no investigation having taken place, and discounted the bruising under his arms which a coroner later stated meant that third-party involvement could not be ruled out. They took the supposed suicide note left with his body at face value, sending a small fragment to her and Whitworth's father, asking them to verify whether it was his handwriting. Although they said they were unsure, it was established at trial that Barking & Dagenham Police had recorded this as confirmation it was Whitworth's handwriting and that the police had not submitted the note for expert analysis.

When the couple were later shown the complete document, Whitworth's father immediately commented that he saw nothing to indicate it had been written by his son. The couple had also asked whether the police had investigated who was meant by "the guy I was with last night", and that the response was that it would never be possible to find out all the answers. Asking about challenging the open verdict or continuing the investigation, his stepmother encountered what she described as an attitude of "it is what it is, deal with it".

Similarly, Taylor's sister reported the police simply telling the family "Jack's dead" and accepting the syringe in his pocket, white powder in his wallet and needle marks on his arm as indicating that he had sat down by himself and overdosed on drugs, although her brother was very anti-drugs. She and another sister contacted Barking & Dagenham Police 11 days after his death for an update on their investigation and were astonished to discover none was taking place. They then researched for themselves and came across the three previous cases, but the police responded by denying there was any connection.

Eventually, two weeks after his death, the police agreed to take the two sisters to where Taylor's body had been found and, at Barking Station, told them that CCTV footage of Taylor and another man had been found. The sisters were surprised not to have been notified, and more surprised to be told the police were not attempting to identify the other man. One described the attitude of the police as "shocking". In response to their questioning the credibility of the police account of what the footage showed, a sergeant later contacted them to say that, upon review, the footage did not show Taylor entering the churchyard alone. They then requested that images of the other man be made public in order to identify him; the police were reluctant, saying that they did not normally release CCTV images, but eventually gave in, and two days later Port was identified from the images and arrested.

Following Port's conviction, the Independent Police Complaints Commission opened an investigation into whether 17 police officers should face disciplinary action. As of November 2017, this was expected to be completed in Spring 2018, but not made public until after a verdict in a new joint inquest on all four deaths; the inquests on Kovari and Whitworth were later quashed. The families opened a civil claim against the Metropolitan Police, which was settled for undisclosed amounts in 2022.

The Metropolitan Police also reported in 2016 that they were re-examining 58 unexplained deaths involving date-rape drugs, although a spokeswoman said there was nothing to suggest that Port was linked to any of them.

Police identified Port as a "significant witness" subject to a rape allegation hours after his first victim was found dead.

In June 2022, the Independent Office of Police Conduct reopened investigations into the way the deaths were handled due to alleged "material flaws" in its previous investigation.

== Gerald Matovu ==
In 2019, Gerald Matovu, who was known to have supplied Port with the GHB used in the killings, was arrested and later convicted of the murder of actor and businessman Eric Michels. He was sentenced to life imprisonment with a minimum term of 31 years. Using similar methods to Port, Matovu had targeted Michels on Grindr and had given him a fatal dose of GHB.

== Aftermath ==
In August 2018, it was revealed that Port had lodged an appeal against his murder convictions. In November 2018, it was announced that Port's appeal had been rejected.

In August 2020, in a Brazilian chat show programme, Que História é Essa, Porchat?, hosted by Fábio Porchat, an audience member named Rafael told his story of dating Port. Rafael had moved to London in 2012 at 19 years old, and had been working as a waiter when he met Port on a dating website. After they started dating, Rafael moved into Port's apartment, where they lived together for a little longer than a month. After they broke up, Rafael moved back to Brazil, where he got a different job and started another relationship. One day, he decided to search for Port's name online and found out about the murders through an article on BBC. Rafael said he first read the words “documentary”, “Stephen Port” and “serial killer”, and was interested since he thought Port had made a documentary on a serial killer, until he read it and realized what it was actually about. After he discovered the truth about Port, Rafael said that “looking back, there [were] a lot of strange things going on”. Another former partner of Port's also claimed to have broken up with Port due to his unusual behaviour.

In July 2020, it was announced that a fresh inquiry was set to take place in January 2021, to examine all four deaths and probe into any police failings.

As of November 2023, IOPC was investigating eight former and current police officers for gross misconduct regarding the cases.

== Media portrayal ==
In 2017, the BBC aired the documentary How Police Missed the Grindr Killer, which examined the botched investigation into Port's murders. Also in 2017, the murders were documented in Crimes That Shook Britain. In 2022, the Channel 4 documentary series Surviving a Serial Killer covered Port's crimes.

In January 2022, the BBC aired the drama thriller Four Lives, based on the investigation led by the families of Port's murder victims. The drama, written by Neil McKay and originally titled The Barking Murders, stars Stephen Merchant as Port, with Sheridan Smith and Jaime Winstone in supporting roles.

== See also ==
- List of prisoners with whole life orders
- List of serial killers in the UK
- List of serial killers by number of victims
- List of serial rapists
