= Dudesnude =

Social networking website for men who have sex with men

DudesNude
- Website type: Gay online dating, photo database, cruising
- Available in: English
- Headquarters: Zürich, Switzerland
- Owner: Theme Park AG
- Website: www.dudesnude.com
- Commercial: Yes
- Registration: Required
- Launched: 2002; 24 years ago

dudesnude is a popular social networking website dedicated to gay, bisexual, bicurious and men who have sex with men. The site was launched in 2002 and by 2010 it reported over 500,000 members. The website's purpose is to facilitate chat, dating, and setting up sexual encounters known as hookups. The site also has a live-streaming feature, where members can chat with others while masturbating on webcam. Its slogan in 2010 was "picture, video, and profile sharing for men!" Originally run from London, the site has been operated since 2020 by Theme Park AG in Zürich, Switzerland.

== Interface and users ==
Members select various statistics which include, race, age, height, weight, adherence to safer sex practices, amount of body hair, body type, penis size, and other criteria. They also upload pictures of themselves, at least one of which must show their unclothed body, shirt off. As a result, the site has been described as the most graphic and audacious of the gay dating sites. There is a space on the profile dedicated to a text description of the member and what he is looking for, these blurbs range from a few sentences to full pages. Members join any of several communities such as those reserved for those that are visibly muscular. Members can then choose to allow or disallow other communities from being able to see them. This community-based system is one of the site's unique selling propositions in that it allows a more nuanced search function for attributes within user profiles. It acts as a pre-search, along with age range preferences, so that members only see, and are only seen by, other members who they are likely to find attractive, thus giving the impression that the site is dedicated to their tastes and requirements and avoiding unwanted contact.

Another of the site's features, once a unique selling point but something other sites have since adopted, is an optional verification feature, used to give other members a greater degree of certainty that the pictures on the profile are of the person using it. Each member has a unique profile ID number. They take a picture of themselves holding up this number which is checked by site staff, and if it can be seen to match the profile pics, a verification mark is awarded. The site also has a complex search feature to search for type of pictures or video by the various characteristics listed above.

Dudesnude is free for a basic profile, which gives access to almost all features and is not as restricted as the offerings of some of the other players in the field. Dudesnude has been reported as "fun" to carouse through, A paid profile allow for more storage space, faster video download, the ability to message those with full inboxes and a 'tracker' facility to show who looked at your profile. Dudesnude was originally owned by Invades Ltd, hosted in the USA and administered from the United Kingdom. Since 2020 it has been operated by Theme Park AG of Zürich, which in 2026 launched DudesChat, a separate social and chat app for gay and bisexual men that uses the same login.

Twink porn star Tory Mason was discovered off of his dudesnude profile.

== Site popularity and review ==
The site receives more than 72 million hits a year. According to Alexa rankings the site is the 7,583rd-most-popular website, making it more popular than competitor and pioneer gay.com and third only to competitors adam4adam and manhunt.net.

In 2005 the British magazine QX reviewed the site and said that it had one of the best search functions for making social connections.

Dudesnude makes over US$163,000 a year in revenues from advertising, memberships, and an online porn viewing section and store. The site receives more than 72 million hits a year. The estimated worth of the website is US$329,482.99.

Dudesnude won a Boyz Magazine scene award in April 2011.

== Global appeal ==
The website is popular worldwide, which is an oddity as most gay hookup sites are based either in the United States, Europe or Australia but dudesnude is popular throughout. Dudesnude is most popular in the United States followed by South Korea, Canada and México.

In 2007 dudesnude featured in the controversial GenderBender Festival in Italy, being the topic of the audio collage "Into My Eyes".

== Public health ==
Many public health groups targeting treatment of sexually transmitted diseases have criticized online sex sites such as dudesnude in addition to its counterparts, Manhunt, gay.com, and adam4adam, because of their high incidence of facilitating unprotected sex and therefore the transmission of HIV and other STDs. In fact, research in Australia shows that condom usage between partners that meet through dudesnude is low.

== See also ==
- Homosocialization
