= Gingerbeer =

Gingerbeer may refer to:

- Ginger beer, a drink
- Gingerbeer (web community), a London-based web community for lesbians and bisexual women
