= Grindr: The Opera =

Musical by Erik Ransom

- An Unauthorized Parody
- Music: Erik Ransom
- Lyrics: Erik Ransom
- Basis: Grindr; Online dating Hookup culture
- Premiere: 2015: New York City

Grindr: The Opera, also known as Grindr: The Opera – An Unauthorized Parody, is a sung-through musical with a book, music and lyrics created by American composer and playwright Erik Ransom. The musical is based on the gay dating application Grindr and it satirises online dating, hookup culture and the way technology effects relationships among gay men.

The work personifies Grindr as a supernatural and manipulative figure who watches and intervenes in the lives of four app users. Its creators have characterised the work as like a rock operetta. After it started in the United States, the musical was put on in London, including shows at Above the Stag Theatre and the Union Theatre. The Above the Stag show won Best New Musical at the 2019 Off West End Theatre Awards.

== Background and development ==
At first, Ransom based the show around the gay web-based dating service Manhunt. After viewing profiles on the website, he saw a lot of drama in the mix of sexuality, loneliness and desire. When Grindr became more popular than Manhunt Ransom changed the focus of the opera to Grindr.

Director Rachel Klein joined the project after Ransom sent her the script, with Charles Czarnecki serving as arranger and musical director. An early version was shown in a concert in London, followed by a rehearsed reading in New York in 2015. The original Manhunt idea was kept as a musical prelude introducing the Grindr users.

== Synopsis ==
Grindr is shown as an ancient, supernatural siren who oversees the meetings of four men who correspond loosely to different groups seen on Grindr: Devon, a romantic looking for a relationship; Tom, a cynic; Jack, a young twink who mainly wants sex; and Don, an older and closeted daddy. Their meetings through the app develop into relationships and sex before their individual stories come together.

Grindr tries to maintain control over the men, getting stronger from their desire and uncertainty while being threatened when users form relationships and leave the app. Alongside its sexual humour, the musical addresses themes including loneliness, internalised homophobia, cheating, sexual health and the balance between casual sex and real love.

== Characters ==
The main character is a supernatural personification of Grindr who watches and manipulates the lives of the other characters.

The four main users of the app are Devon, who is looking for a relationship; Tom, a cynical Grindr user; Jack, a young twink mostly looking for casual sex; and Don, an older, closeted married man who uses the application to meet younger men.

Some later productions also include Illecebra and Cupiditas as helpers to Grindr.

== Productions ==
The musical was created in the early 2010s and was first read in New York in April 2015.

A show directed by Andrew Beckett and produced by Peter Bull was staged at Above the Stag Theatre in London in 2018. Aaron Clingham was the musical director. Christian Lunn portrayed Grindr, with the show presenting the app as an evil figure watching the meetings of its users. The show won Best New Musical at the 2019 Off West End Theatre Awards. It returned to Above the Stag in 2019.

The original London cast recording was produced by Peter Bull and William Spencer in 2019 and released in 2020.

The musical was revived by Peter Bull at London's Union Theatre in 2023, directed and choreographed by William Spencer. Lunn returned as Grindr, along with James Lowrie as Jack, Dereck Walker as Don, Santino Zapico as Devon and Billy J Vale as Tom. James Aymon and Grant Jackson playing as Illecebra and Cupiditas respectively.

The show came back to the Union Theatre in 2026 before going on a UK tour. Spencer was the director and choreographer again, with Aaron Clingham as musical director and Peter Bull producing for Above the Stag Theatre.

In October 2026 it was announced that Peter Bull's UK production of the show will open in Melbourne in January 2027 with an Australian cast, again directed and choreographed by William Spencer, produced in Australia by DV Live.

== Music and style ==
The musical is sung-through. The music uses many different musical styles instead of conventional classic opera. During its development, arranger Charles Czarnecki said the work is like a rock operetta rather than standard opera.

== Themes ==
Alastair James of Attitude said that the musical talks about discriminatory attitudes found on dating apps, including choices that leave out some users based on body type or how manly they seem, while not making Grindr itself seem beneficial or harmful.

== Reception ==
Reviewing the 2018 Above the Stag production, Jonathan Baz praised the show's use of the personified Grindr as a manipulative presence. Paul Vale of The Stage described the production as "an amusing parody".

The 2023 Union Theatre revival also received generally positive reviews. James, writing for Attitude, praised the cast and Ransom's lyrics and described the production as "satire at its best and most camp". Mark Lloyd of A Youngish Perspective gave the production four stars, noting that even though the show was funny, it treated its characters and the emotional consequences of hookup culture more seriously than he had expected.

Reviewing the 2026 Union Theatre production, Richard Voyce of Plays to See gave the musical four stars, observing that despite its title the work functioned primarily as musical theatre, while noting its largely sung-through structure and operatic elements. Sheilina Somani of Everything Theatre similarly praised the production's combination of comedy and more serious observations about technology and gay dating.

== Awards and nominations ==
Year	Award	Category	Result
2019	Off West End Theatre Awards	Best New Musical	Won
