= Blued (app) =

Chinese LGBTQ+ social network app

- Original author: Ma Baoli/Geng Le
- Developer: BlueCity Group
- Release: 2012; 14 years ago
- Stable release: 2.8.16 / March 14, 2019
- Operating system: iOS and Android
- Available in: English, Spanish, French, Portuguese, Italian, Indonesian, Japanese, Korean, Thai, Vietnamese, Simplified Chinese, Traditional Chinese
- Type: Social network
- Website: Blued.com

Blued is a gay social network app. The app was launched in 2012 in China, and has over 40 million users worldwide in 193 countries, as of 2018. The application is available on Android and iOS. Its features include verified profiles, live broadcasting, a timeline, and group conversations. In 2016, the app was valued at 600 million dollars.

== History ==
Ma Baoli, (Chinese: 马保力; pinyin: Mǎ Bǎolì; also known as Geng Le; 耿乐; Gěng Lè), a police officer in Qinhuangdao, Hebei, set up Danlan (淡蓝; Dànlán; 'light blue', a reference to the Bohai Sea) a message board for gay men in 2000. As the site gained more attention, his supervisors eventually discovered in 2012 that Ma ran the website and forced him to resign. He then came up with Blue'd, which was initially based on the American app Jack'd, and released it the same year after seeking investors.

Blued employs over 200 staff at its headquarters in Beijing, China, with offices in London, UK and India to oversee the rapid expansion of the app overseas. Within 4 years, Blued has become the largest gay social network in the world with over 27 million registered users.

The app, BlueCity Holdings Limited in general, and Ma himself have been recognized for their health promotion efforts, particularly in the prevention of HIV/AIDS infections. Danlan had collaborated with health officials in Beijing to promote HIV testing to higher-risk demographics soon after its launch. After one of Ma's friends told him he was infected with HIV in 2009, BlueCity took a more comprehensive approach, eventually hosting forums with Chinese CDC and UNAIDS members, and premier Li Keqiang met with Ma in 2012 to discuss HIV/AIDS in China and discrimination against the LGBT community. This role has also been credited with giving the company more lenient treatment from the Chinese government, which has a mixed record on LGBT rights and has shut down or censored other LGBT online spaces.

In 2016, Blued partnered with Hornet, a social networking platform for gay and bisexual men. Commenting on the global partnership between Blued and Hornet, Hornet president Sean Howell declared: “Gay apps have evolved over the past few years to more fully engage users, who demand a richer, mobile experience”.

In 2020, the application had 6.4 million monthly users.

Ma announced that he would resign from BlueCity in August 2022, shortly after it was delisted from the Nasdaq.

In November 2025, Blued was removed from the iOS App Store in China, as well as Chinese app stores for Android, at the request from Chinese authorities.

== BlueCity Holdings Limited ==
BlueCity Holdings was founded in 2000 and is headquartered in Beijing, China with over 800 employees.

BlueCity Holdings Limited, of which Ma is CEO of, owns the following platforms:

- Blued
- Danlan Public Interest, a HIV prevention nonprofit
- He Health (荷尔健康; Hè'ěr jiànkāng, a platform for men's health, including through delivery of PrEP
- LESDO, a social platform for lesbian and bisexual women that was founded in 2014 and was acquired by BlueCity in 2020; reportedly China's second-biggest dating app for lesbians
- Finka (翻咔), a social media app targeted at gay and bisexual LGBTQ men with a userbase of 2.7 million as of 2019, acquired by BlueCity in 2020
- Blued Baby, a surrogacy platform for gay Chinese men looking for surrogates in other countries; ceased operations in 2021 after the Zheng Shuang surrogacy controversy

=== Ownership ===
There have been several ownership transformations. Prior to privatization, BlueCity Holdings was a publicly traded entity. On July 8, 2022, its US IPO (initial public offering) priced at USD 16 per ADS, raised approximately USD 84.8 million. In January 2022 its Going-Private Proposal by Ma and Spriver Tech Limited was a preliminary non-binding offer of 1.85 USD per ADS. April 30, 2022 the Definitive Agreement for Privatization was made with an equity valued at approximately 60 million USD. The buyer group included Ma, Metaclass Management ELP, and CDH Entities. The merger was completed on August 12, 2022, making BlueCity Holdings Limited a wholly-owned subsidiary of Multelements Limited, delisting from Nasdaq.

In August 2023, Newborn Town Inc. acquired Chizicheng Strategy Investment Limited, the general partner to Metaclass Management ELP. This acquisition placed full control of BlueCity under Newborn Town Inc., the current controlling shareholder. Metaclass Management ELP took BlueCity private.

== See also ==
- Homosocialization
- Timeline of online dating services
- Tinder
