= 97.8 FM =

FM radio frequency

The following radio stations broadcast on FM frequency 97.8 MHz:

== Israel ==
- Kan Gimel in Arabah, Jerusalem and Safed

== New Zealand ==
- The Hits in Manawatū-Whanganui

== United Kingdom ==
- Gaydio in Brighton
