= 88.4 FM =

FM radio frequency

The following radio stations broadcast on FM frequency 88.4 MHz:

== China ==
- CNR The Voice of China in Deyang, Heyuan, Xuzhou and Zhuzhou
- CNR Business Radio in Wuzhong
- CRI News Radio in Yantai (stopped airing in August 2017)

== Indonesia ==
- Okezone Radio in Jakarta
- Global Radio Bandung

== Malaysia ==
- Hitz in Alor Setar, Kedah, Perlis, Penang and Kota Bharu, Kelantan

== Poland ==
- Radio Maryja in Bielsko-Biała, Mrągowo

== United Kingdom ==
- BBC Radio 2 in Calder Valley, Campbeltown, Carmarthenshire, Colwyn Bay, Folkestone, Hebden Bridge, Isle of Man, Kenley, Peebles, Pontypridd, South Wales, West Yorkshire
- Gaydio in Manchester
