= Aditya Bandopadhyay =

Indian lawyer and LGBTQ rights activist

- Born: February 1972 (age 54)
- Education: Calcutta University University of Burdwan,
- Occupation: Lawyer
- Known for: LGBTQ rights activism

Aditya Bandopadhyay (sometimes transliterated as Bondyopadhyay, born February 1972) is a lawyer and LGBTQ rights activist in India, helping to challenge anti-sodomy laws, establishing advocacy organizations and providing legal services to HIV/AIDS organizations.

== Early life and education ==
Bondyopadhyay grew up mostly in Agra, Uttar Pradesh State, India, though he spent parts of his childhood in Assam, India. Over the years Bondyopadhyay has lived in the Indian cities of Agra, Chabua, Guwahati, Kolkata, and Delhi. He first attended Calcutta University and thereafter studied law at the University of Burdwan, both in West Bengal, India.

== Activism ==
Bondyopadhyay has been an activist for LGBTQ rights since 1993. Bondyopadhyay played a leading role in the movement to decriminalize sodomy in India. He also works with the HIV/AIDS movement in South Asia for the prevention intervention of male-to-male sexual [MSM] transmission, care support, and treatment issues of people living with HIV (PLHIV) and MSM.

Part of his work is his association with the Lawyers Collective, one of India's leading Human Rights Groups, and with the Naz Foundation, a London-based agency that has helped set up over forty community-owned HIV projects for MSM in India, Pakistan, Nepal, and Bangladesh. He also coordinated the Secretariat of the Asia Pacific Coalition on Male Sexual Health (APCOM)] from its inception in October 2006 until December 2008.

In 2001, he represented four employees of the NAZ Foundation and Bharosa Trust (an NGO in the city of Lucknow, India with the mission of HIV prevention efforts within the MSM community) who were charged with conspiracy to commit sodomy and possession of obscene material after a raid of their offices. He also ensured the unsealing of the offices after the raid and the continuation of the organisation's work. He was also part of the legal team that aided Blue Diamond Society, Nepal's leading LGBTQ rights organization, in defending a challenge to their existence and functioning brought before the Nepali Supreme Court.

He was part of the legal team that researched and drafted the petition filed in the Delhi High Court challenging the constitutionality of India's anti-sodomy law, Section 377 Indian Penal Code. This petition (Naz Foundation v. Govt. of NCT of Delhi and Others) resulted in the 2 July 2009 decision of the Delhi High Court decriminalizing homosexuality in India and reading down the Section 377 to imply that it shall not apply to private adult consensual sexual activity.

Bondyopadhyay was the first Asian and the third queer person in the world to testify before the United Nations Committee on Human Rights in 2002, against the state-supported and sponsored oppression of sexual minorities in India. His testimony was the third testimony the UN had heard to date relating to abuse on account of sexual orientation.

He is the Director of Adhikaar, an LGBTQ human rights organisation based in Delhi, India, working to secure equal citizenship rights for all sexual minorities in India. He is a founding member of the Global Forum for MSM and HIV and sat on its steering committee from its inception in 2007 until May 2014. He is a member of the Governing Board of APCOM. Bandopadhyay helps run the Harmless Hugs collective, organizing for LGBTQ rights in India as well as serving as an adviser to various international development agencies.

== Publications ==
Laws Affecting LGBT Persons in South Asia, A Desk Review

Same-Sex Love in a Difficult Climate; A study into the life situation of Sexual Minority (Lesbian, Gay, Bisexual, Kothi and Transgender) persons in Bangladesh; co-authored with Shale Ahmed

My Body is Not Mine; Violence and hope in the lives of Kothsi; co-authored with Vidya Shah and photographs by Parthiv Shah

From the Frontline; Study into the violence faced by Kothis and MSM in six cities of India and one city in Bangladesh; co-authored with Shivananda Khan

Against the Odds; The impact of legal, socio-cultural, legislative and socio-economic impediments to effective HIV/AIDS interventions with males who have sex with males in Bangladesh; co-authored with Shivananda Khan
