= MyGwork =

LGBTQ+ recruitment and networking hub

myGwork
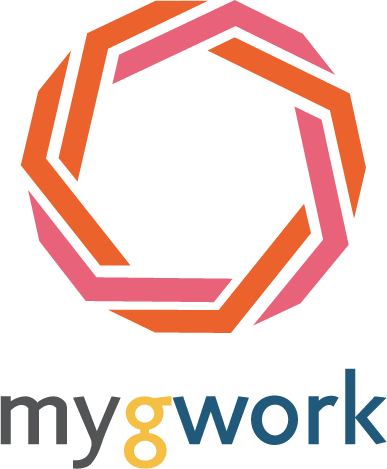
- Company type: Private
- Website type: Social network service
- Available in: English
- Founded: 2013; 13 years ago
- Headquarters: London, {{{location_country}}}
- Area served: Worldwide
- Founders: Adrien Gaubert; Pierre Gaubert
- Industry: Internet
- Website: www.mygwork.com
- Registration: Required
- Launched: 2013
- Current status: Active

myGwork is a business community for LGBTQ+ professionals, graduates, and inclusive employers. It aims to empower the LGBTQ+ community by providing members a safe space where they can connect with inclusive employers, find jobs, mentors, professional events and news.

== History ==
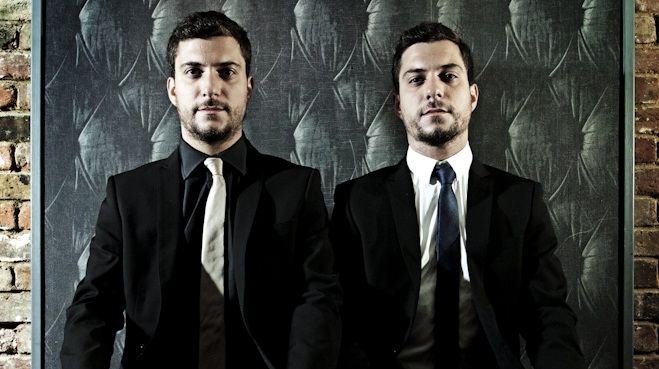
Pierre Gaubert and Adrien Gaubert, founders of myGwork

Adrien and Pierre Gaubert founded myGwork in 2013 after the death of their mother, Francoise, who was concerned that they would encounter homophobia in their working lives. The platform has been called "LinkedIn for the LGBT community."

In 2015, GeekTime included myGwork in its list of the top startups along with Lyft, Airbnb, Square and Snapchat.

In December 2021, myGwork raised £1.6 million from 24Haymarket and led by James Campin-Baby.

== Model ==
myGwork has been recognized for redefining how LGBT+ professionals seek for, locate, and get employment in inclusive organisations. Using a combination of a news blog, event hosting, and a social networking function, the company has created an active business network.

myGwork operates two formal offices, including its global headquarters in London and its European headquarters in Madrid. In addition to this, the company has a global presence with partners and operations around the globe.

== WorkPride ==
In June 2020, as a result of the coronavirus pandemic cancelling Pride parades across the globe, myGwork announced its first global conference, "WorkPride", a 5-day conference that replaced the cancelled events.

WorkPride has been held every June since 2020, with hundreds of speakers and thousands of attendees.

== WorkFair ==
MyGwork started an annual event, WorkFair, in 2021, making it one of the largest online LGBTQ+ job fairs for graduates and job seekers. Attendees can peruse company stands, interact with recruiters, and attend workshops aimed to provide them with the skills essential to stand out in their next job application.

== myGwork Academy ==
myGwork founded the myGwork Academy in early 2023 to provide LGBTQ+ training and education that promises to create inclusive environments for all.

== Awards ==
- Honoured as 2021's Top 100 Global LGBT+ OUTstanding Executives
- 2022: Bank of London's Rainbow Honours Award (small brand or organisation category)

== See also ==
- Homosocialization
