= PLUN.ASIA =

Vietnamese gay social networking service

- Website type: Social Networking and Dating website
- Available in: English, Vietnamese
- Owner: DWM Inc.
- Creator: Kelvin To
- Website: www.plun.asia
- Commercial: Yes
- Registration: Required
- Launched: October 2010
- Current status: Defunct

PLUN.ASIA, formerly PLU-N.COM, was a bilingual social networking service that catered to the Vietnamese gay community worldwide. A digital brand of DWM Inc., it provided tools to help users find and connect with friends. Its slogan was "He's Here", reflecting the site's mission to help singles find their dream boys. In November 2010, it declared its business model, a gay dating and social networking site, the only one of its kind in Vietnam and Asia. It is believed to compete with Fridae and gaydar in the Vietnam market.

PLUN was founded by Kelvin To in 2010. After spending nine years seeking funding for the project, he decided to start the website himself. PLUN is the main supporter and sponsor of some of the largest local Asian LGBT events, such as Angel Style and Bitch Party, and regional events such as Black Party; White Party; Pride Manila in Manila, Philippines; and gCircuit Songkran 2013 in Bangkok, Thailand.

== The name ==
PLUN stands for PLU Nation. PLU (People Like Us) is a common term used in Hong Kong, Singapore and Malaysia to refer to the LGBT community. Kelvin To, a Vietnamese, chose to have PLU in the site's name because he spent most of his early years in Singapore.

== Features ==
PLUN's users have described it as "gay.com meets Facebook meets Foursquare". It quickly became popular among Vietnamese users when Facebook—their new favorite channel after Yahoo! 360 was closed in 2008—became more difficult to access due to government restrictions (see Censorship of Facebook).

In January 2011, CEO K To announced a new version world be released by year end, followed by a mobile app.

== Management change and rebranding ==
In July 2011, To made a share buyback offer to other partners and became DWM's controlling shareholder.

In December 2011, DWM rebranded the website PLUN.ASIA, and few months later, a new team was hired to create the next version of PLUN. In early December 2012, a month before version 2.0 was to be released, PLUN released a video, "Even We're Apart" (Yêu Trong Xa Cách), which immediately became a phenomenon in the local LGBT community and on official media channels. It was featured on VNExpress' Ione, Zing's YouTube Channel, Kenh14, and HimMag.
