= Squirt.org =

Gay hookup website

- Website type: Online cruising and hookup service
- Available in: Multiple languages
- Owner: Pink Triangle Press
- Website: Website
- Registration: Required
- Launched: 1999
- Current status: Online

Squirt.org, launched by Pink Triangle Press in 1999, is a Canadian website which describes itself as a place "where men meet other men for sex, cruising, hookups, dating, fun and friendship". The website, based in Toronto, is available worldwide. It includes user-generated listings of parks, saunas, public toilets and popular sexual locations for men who have sex with men (MSM). It was called "unique and ideal for cruising world-wide" by the 2006 Spartacus International Gay Guide.

== Website ==
Squirt.org is primarily a hookup website, and profiles are uncensored. The site has profiles for standard hookups, live-cam chat rooms, gay cruising spots, videos, and "cocktales" (erotic user-generated stories). Squirt.org, available free of charge, also has a pay tier with additional services.

In smaller cities, the site may list public parks, truck stops, and mall bathrooms (known as locales) for gay encounters. Listings for larger cities may include gyms, malls, hotel washrooms, city parks, libraries, sex clubs, bathhouses and saunas, fetish and strip clubs, beaches, public washrooms, video arcades, theaters, cinemas, booths, and college and university campuses.

The website's cruising listings include a location's general description and directions to it. There is a description of the type of people who go there, and when the location is generally active; cruising tips may also be included about the location. Some listings include a section for pet peeves and warnings to users about local police activity or security monitoring. Each location includes a comment section for sharing personal anecdotes.

Gay rights campaigner Peter Tatchell has noted that listings and postings on the website make people "easy targets" and "bring places to the attention of people who would be prepared to close them down". Increased sexual activities in public toilets (cottaging) due to their listing on the website have caused facilities to close in the United Kingdom and Australia.

Squirt.org launched its mobile site in 2009. Due to the changes in the gay online dating marketplace caused by Grindr, however, it released a new format in 2012, adopting the GPS location-based technology used by Grindr and Scruff. Squirt Mobile is available via web browser, making it accessible by almost any mobile device. It is not available in app stores due to guidelines related to nudity, which is permitted on Squirt Mobile. The app was first released in the UK and, later, worldwide.

== Campaigns and controversy ==
The website has been controversial due to its promotion of illegal activity, and municipal police in some jurisdictions have been known to have their vice units monitor similar websites. Due to its facilitation of seeking out others for unprotected sex ("barebacking"), the website has been used in sexually transmitted infection (STI) and HIV/AIDS research and outreach, and research on "hookup" sites for MSM. The website has co-operated with HIV/AIDS outreach programs, which have provided sexual-health information to its users.

The site's 2015 "Non-Stop Cruising" campaign sparked a backlash in Dallas after complaints were received about its billboard, which featured three ethnically diverse men embracing. In September 2015, the Toronto Transit Commission decided to remove advertisements for the website from its subway trains after riders complained that the ads promoted illegal sexual activity.

Its advertisements were removed from bus stops in Cardiff in 2016, following claims that they were inappropriate. In 2016, the Dutch Advertising Standards Board received a number of complaints about indecency in large signs and posters of shirtless men in Amsterdam and other large cities. The board disagreed with the accusations, saying that the men were not posing in a sexual manner or suggestive of sexual acts.

In 2017 in the United States, a 60-year-old man who met a 13-year-old boy on the website was arrested for sexual assault. The website opposed the Trump administration's view of LGBT rights in early 2017, using the slogan "Make America Gay Again" (a parody of "Make America Great Again", Trump's campaign slogan) on posters in Los Angeles and New York City to coincide with the inauguration of Donald Trump.

== See also ==
- Sniffies
- Homosocialization
- List of LGBT social networking services
- Timeline of online dating services
