= Sniffy =

Sniffy may refer to:

== Film and TV characters ==
- Sniffy, character in Duke of the Navy
- Sniffy, We Were Always Young character played by Joe Laurie, Jr.
- Sniffy, character in Convict's Code

== Others ==
- a rat that was saved from becoming art by Rick Gibson
- Sniffy, a comic strip by George Fett

== See also ==
- Sniffy's, a brand name of scratch and sniff stickers
- Sniffies, a map-based hookup app for gay, bisexual, and bi-curious men.
