= Ruth Fassinger =

American academic and educator

Ruth E. Fassinger
- Known for: Fassinger's model of gay and lesbian identity development

Academic background
- Education: State University of New York; Ohio State University

Academic work
- Institutions: University of Maryland; John F. Kennedy University; California State University, Stanislaus

Ruth E. Fassinger is an American educator and academic. She is a professor emerita at the University of Maryland, College Park. She is known for the Fassinger's model of gay and lesbian identity development.

== Early life and education ==
Ruth E. Fassinger completed her Bachelor of Arts and Master of Arts at the State University of New York in 1973 and 1978 respectively. She obtained her PhD from Ohio State University in 1987. Fassinger identifies as part of the LGBTQ community.

== Academic career ==
Fassinger held academic appointments at several institutions. She joined the University of Maryland, College Park in 1987 and worked there until 2016. She also served as dean of the College of Graduate and Professional Studies at John F. Kennedy University and the College of Education at California State University, Stanislaus. After her retirement from her regular position at the university in 2016, she became a professor emerita in the Department of Counseling, Higher Education, and Special Education at the university.

Fassinger is a fellow of the Society of Counseling Psychology and served as its president. She became a fellow of the American Psychological Association (APA) in 1999. She held leadership roles in Division 17 (Society of Counseling Psychology) and Division 44 (Society for the Psychology of Sexual Orientation and Gender Diversity) of the APA and is a founding member of the APA Leadership Institute for Women in Psychology.

She is best known for the Fassinger's model of gay and lesbian identity development, first proposed in 1996 with Susan R. McCarn. The model conceptualizes identity formation as two parallel processes: individual sexual identity relating to one's internal awareness and acceptance of self, and group membership identity relating to one's role in the gay/lesbian community. In 1997, Fassinger and Brett A. Miller validated the theory with a group of diverse gay men. She was the co-author of the book The Intersection of Race, Class, and Gender in Multicultural Counseling published in 2001. She won the Early Career Scientist-Researcher Award from the American Psychological Association in 1997 for her research on counseling psychology and sexual identity.
