= Adam4Adam =

Online dating website for men

- Adam4Adam logo

- Owner: A4A Network Inc.
- Website: www.adam4adam.com
- Registration: Required
- Launched: 2003
- Current status: Active

Adam4Adam is an online dating website designed for men to meet other men "for friendship, romance, or a hot hookup".

== Ranking ==
As of September 2005, San Jose Mercury News ranked Adam4Adam as the second most popular online gay personals site in the United States (being ranked behind Gay.com). As of March 2007, Hitwise ranked it number one (the number two and three position being occupied by Manhunt and Gay.com).

== Characteristics ==
Adam4Adam was launched in 2003 by a company called "Convergent Ideas, LLC" and is now operated by "A4A Network Inc.". Adam4Adam's members are mostly in the United States.

Unlike similar competitors, Adam4Adam does not charge members to use its full range of services. Instead, Adam4Adam receives revenue from advertising, particularly from pay-per-view pornographic websites and companies offering erection enhancement drugs like sildenafil, vardenafil, tadalafil and their generic drug equivalents through mail order.

The site offers a "plan-a-trip feature" to locate potential friends or dates where one is headed. It also has a specific way of posting party invitations.

Although Adam4Adam has members of all ethnic groups, the percentage of non-White men represented in member profiles is higher than the percentage of non-White people in the United States population, though the degree to which this is true varies by city/region. For instance, research into demographic representation in Atlanta, San Francisco, and New York City profiles evidences a trend of higher representations of men of color among younger age cohorts, with decreasing diversity in profiles as age increase. This is also true of Adam4Adam membership in the United Kingdom.

Unlike Manhunt and some other sites, Adam4Adam does not prohibit escort ads, however such ads are placed in a category separated from the mainstream personal ads. As with most sites of this type, members are allowed to post nude photos and many choose to do so.

Adam4Adam provides a "Health Resource" page as well as a page devoted to "Online Safety Tips". The site encourages health organizations to create "Health Counselor" accounts. All these measures encourage good health practices such as safe sex, getting tested for sexually transmitted infections and avoiding methamphetamine addiction. The counselors also discourage the party and play phenomenon.

The site also maintains an interactive blog. Posts are organized into several categories, ranging from sex to lifestyle to news.

== Crime ==
In October 2006, New York City-area media including The New York Times and WCBS-TV reported that Adam4Adam was the focus of a conspiracy to find gay men online to rob. A number of men in New York City used the site to lure a Brooklyn man to a remote area where he was robbed and murdered. The men were found when one user was identified via his screenname.

Many news sources reported similar occurrences in the Washington Metropolitan Area. In discussing the case of a perpetrator of multiple robberies in that region, a Washington, D.C. police officer from that police force's Gay & Lesbian Liaison Unit said "We've definitely seen an increase in online dating crimes in the past five years" and added that victims of internet dating crimes are "overwhelmingly men cruising for sex."

The same police officer also noted that these criminals are often technologically savvy and create profiles using fake information and other people's photos from cyber cafés or public libraries, making them difficult to trace.

A high-profile April 2010 murder investigation in the Washington, D.C., area revealed that the victim, a high school principal, met his assailants through adam4adam.com.

In reporting on the murder of a 39-year-old San Diego man by a 19-year-old U.S. Marine, an editorial in the Gay and Lesbian Times said that the victim:

was an avid user of adam4adam.com, a popular gay chat and hook-up Web site. Instincts told us that the victim may have met his killer online and invited him into his Little Italy apartment, where he ultimately met his fate.

== Outing ==
Adam4Adam has also been used to "out" people who have otherwise kept their sexual orientation somewhat secret.

The Servicemembers Legal Defense Network warned United States military personnel in 2004 that online profiles on Adam4Adam and similar sites were a violation of the "Don't ask, don't tell" policy, and that in some cases online profiles were being used as evidence in outing service members to military command.

According to the Gay and Lesbian Times:

In many cases it's either a jilted ex-lover, a roommate or friend who is upset about something who knows that the service member has the online ad or profile and they then print out that profile and give it to the command.

Adam4Adam has also been mentioned by sources such as the New York Daily News in reference to the outing of an American Idol contestant who previously had said that he was heterosexual.

New York Daily News also reported that the Adam4Adam dating profile of artist Ross Bleckner was printed in the Coagula Art Journal. In the Coagula Art Journal article, Bleckner's "age, 33-inch waistline and youthful photo" were questioned, but ultimately accepted by the magazine as true since "overall (for Internet personals), he's a pretty honest, bland dude. Like his art." Bleckner laughed off the incident, saying "For them, that's high praise!"

== Dating ==
While Adam4Adam and other social networking venues are often dismissed as "sex sites", there is evidence to the contrary. For example, the Washington Blade featured an article about the evolution of online dating in which it was reported that:

an increasing number of gay and lesbian youth have taken their first steps into the "gay community" by passing through an online chat room door. Gay male social networking sites like Manhunt, [Silverdaddies,] Adam4Adam and the recently launched DList, for "edgy gay men," provide just as easy an opportunity for men to find a coffee date as easy as a gangbang.

== Regulation ==
Adam4Adam uses the new "Restricted To Adults" label in the metatags of its pages. The RTA label is free to use, voluntary, and universally available to any website that wishes to clearly and effectively label itself as being inappropriate for viewing by minors. The Free Speech Coalition recently endorsed the RTA website label.

Maryclaire Dale, Associated Press Writer, March 22, 2007, writes:

Federal judge blocks 1998 online porn law.

Software filters work much better than a 1998 federal law designed to keep pornography away from children on the Internet, a federal judge ruled Thursday in striking down the measure on free-speech grounds.

Senior U.S. District Judge Lowell Reed Jr. also said the Child Online Protection Act fails to address threats that have emerged since the law was written, including online predators on social-networking sites like MySpace, because it targets only commercial Web publishers.

"Even defendant's own study shows that all but the worst performing (software) filters are far more effective than COPA would be at protecting children from sexually explicit material on the Web," said Reed, who presided over a monthlong trial in the fall.

The never-enforced law was Congress' second attempt to protect children from online porn. The U.S. Supreme Court upheld in 2004 a temporary injunction blocking the law from taking effect; Reed on Thursday issued a permanent injunction.

The law would have criminalized Web sites that allow children to access material deemed "harmful to minors" by "contemporary community standards." The sites would have been expected to require a credit card number or other proof of age.

Gay & Lesbian News reports that Adam4Adam and similar sites may soon come under an expanded interpretation of 18 U.S.C. 2257, the Child Protection and Obscenity Enforcement Act and wrote:

anyone with a sexually explicit picture on a site like Adam4Adam.com could be considered a secondary producer if the new regulations go into effect, and would be subject to the same type of requirements that the adult Web sites would be under.

If successfully applied, these regulations would mean that Adam4Adam and similar companies would have to keep records proving that individuals appearing in photographs or videos are over the age of 18. They would also have to "categorize those documents in a meticulous manner", with failure to comply resulting in possible felony charges and prison time.

An attorney for the Free Speech Coalition noted:

It's just a series of land mines designed to trap the unwary [...] if you file it wrong, if you put it in [the] wrong alphabetical order [...] you're facing federal prosecution on a first offense with a maximum of five years, [and] a secondary offense [with] a minimum of two years. It's just insane.

Further, not only the company but the website's members could be responsible under these same regulations. The same lawyer remarked that if he had a profile on Adam4Adam this would mean:

I would have to have a photocopy of my own ID and a list in my home ready for federal inspection, a paper with my legal name, or any name I have ever used under any circumstances [...] the form of ID I provided to myself, the serial number of that ID and [would have to have it] signed under penalty of perjury. If I don't have that document or a photo of my ID available 20 hours a week for federal inspection, I've committed a felony.

== Deceased users ==
A 2006 article in The New York Sun entitled "Morbid Web Site Makes Amusement of Online Profiles Left Behind by the Dead" discusses a site that highlights the user profiles on various social networking websites. Adam4Adam is mentioned several times and it is noted that Willi Ninja's profile remained posted on Adam4Adam months after his September 2006 death received widespread press attention. In this article, an Adam4Adam spokesperson is quoted as saying "We deactivate them as soon as we get notified."

== See also ==
- Homosocialization
- Timeline of online dating services
- Tinder
