= Jack'd =

Chat and dating app

- Developer: Perry Street Software
- Release: 2010; 16 years ago
- Operating system: iOS, Android, Windows Phone
- Website: jackd.mobi

Jack'd is a location-based chat and dating app catering to gay and bisexual men. It is available for Android, iPhone, and Windows phones. Jack'd was previously owned by Online Buddies, owner of Manhunt. In 2019, Perry Street Software, the parent company of Scruff, bought Jack'd for an undisclosed sum.

== Controversies ==
On June 13, 2016, the Los Angeles Times reported that Omar Mateen was a Jack'd user for at least a year prior to the Orlando nightclub shooting in which he killed 49 people and wounded 53 others. Jack'd was not able to substantiate those claims.

On February 5, 2019, technology news outlet The Register reported a security flaw in the app in which users' private photos could be publicly viewed by anybody aware of the flaw. On February 7, 2019, Jack'd fixed the bug. On June 28, 2019, the Office of the Attorney General of New York announced that Online Buddies, Inc. will pay the state $240,000 to settle the privacy complaint and that the company would implement a "comprehensive security program" to prevent similar incidents in the future. In a statement, New York State Attorney General Letitia James said, "[Jack'd] put users' sensitive information and private photos at risk of exposure and [Online Buddies] didn't do anything about it for a full year just so they could continue to make a profit."

== See also ==
- Homosocialization
- JOYclub
- Timeline of online dating services
- Tinder
