= Gays.com =

LGBT social networking service and website

- Website type: LGBT social networking service
- Available in: English, German
- Revenue: Advertising
- Website: Gays.com
- Registration: Required
- Launched: 17 May 2008
- Current status: Active

Gays.com is an LGBT social networking service and website launched on 17 May 2008, operated and privately owned by Gays.com Limited. Users must register before using the service, after which they may create a personal profile, add other users as friends and exchange messages.

The June 2008 issue of City Weekend magazine referred to Gays.com as "the gay Facebook".

== History ==
In 2006, the purchase of the domain name for $500,000 by German entrepreneurs Julius and David Dreyer was a record sale for the year and one of the highlights of the domain name industry. The website launched as a closed beta in Shanghai on 17 May 2008, and was timed to coincide with the fourth International Day Against Homophobia and Transphobia. Gays.com became open beta on 10 September 2008.

== See also ==
- Homosocialization
