= Sleepyboy =

Sex worker directory for gay and bi men

Sleepyboy.com is a male escort and sex worker directory service for men who have sex with men in the United Kingdom. It is the most popular male escort website in the UK.

Between 2014 and 2015, the website was one of those used by the serial killer Stephen Port as a means of initially contacting his victims.

As of 2016, the most searched term on the website was "Brazilian".

== See also ==
- List of LGBT social networking services
