= Lowell Selvin =

American businessman

- Born: April 15, 1959 (age 67)
- Education: University of Illinois Urbana-Champaign
- Occupation: Business executive
- Known for: Former chairman and CEO of PlanetOut Inc.

Lowell Selvin (born April 15, 1959) is an American business executive and the former chairman and chief executive officer of PlanetOut Inc. He oversaw the merger of PlanetOut Corp. and Online Partners, as well as the acquisitions of LPI Media and RSVP, a travel company.

== Biography ==
Selvin graduated from the University of Illinois Urbana-Champaign with bachelor's degrees in psychology and aeronautical and astronautical engineering. He later worked for Arbonne International and Arthur Andersen.

Selvin has also been involved with the Gay & Lesbian Network of the Young Presidents' Organization and the Institute for Judaism and Sexual Orientation at Hebrew Union College.

In June 2006, Selvin was succeeded as CEO of PlanetOut by board member Karen Magee.

== Sources ==
- "GLBT History Month". Equality Forum. 2006. Archived from the original on September 26, 2007.
