= Fassinger's model of gay and lesbian identity development =

Fassinger's model of gay and lesbian identity development is an attempt to model gay and lesbian identity development, taking into account cultural and contextual influences. First presented by Ruth Fassinger in 1996 as a model of lesbian identity development, it was validated for men the following year.

== Research ==
In 1991, Susan R. McCarn, a colleague of Ruth Fassinger, studied identity development among a group of thirty-eight lesbians diversifying in age, education, race, ethnicity, and occupation. The analysis of the results of this study lead to the establishment of two processes and four phases, in 1996. In 1997, Fassinger and Brett A. Miller explored a similarly diverse group of gay men, validating the theory for men.

== Theory ==
Fassinger proposed two processes of identity development: Individual sexual identity relating to one's internal awareness and acceptance of self, and group membership identity relating to one's role in the gay/lesbian community.

Both processes consist of four sequential phases, in which an individual can reside in a different phase for each process:

1. Awareness: perceiving oneself as different from other people
2. Exploration: investigating feelings of attraction for individuals of the same sex
3. Deepening/Commitment: internalizing the sense of self as a gay or lesbian person
4. Internalization/Synthesis: incorporating one's sexual identity into one's overall identity

Individuals can repeat phases as new environmental contexts occur, and development in one process can influence development in the other.

For the group membership identity process, Fassinger offers specific markers for the demonstration of each phase:

1. Awareness of the existence of people with different sexual orientations
2. Exploration of one's relationship to the gay and/or lesbian community
3. Commitment to the gay and lesbian community, including an acceptance of the potentially negative consequences
4. Internalizing the minority group identity across contexts

== See also ==
- Cass identity model
- Homosocialization
- Sexual identity
