= Sexual identity =

Sexual self-perception

Sexual identity or sexual orientation identity is an individual's identity as straight, lesbian, gay, bisexual, asexual or another sexual orientation, defined according to their self-perception and experiences, rather than their sexual activity. One's sexual identity may change throughout their life, as they question and explore their sexuality. Some 'unlabeled' individuals reject placing labels on their orientation.

Historical models of sexual identity development (for example Vivienne Cass's 1979 model of identity development) have viewed it as a process only undergone by LGBTQ people, whereas contemporary models treat the process as a universal component of identity formation undergone by heterosexuals as well.

== Definitions and identity ==
Sexual identity has been described as a component of an individual's identity that reflects their sexual self-concept. The integration of the respective identity components (e.g. moral, religious, ethnic, occupational) into a greater overall identity is essential to the process of developing the multi-dimensional construct of identity.

Sexual identity can change throughout an individual's life, and may or may not align with biological sex, sexual behavior or actual sexual orientation. In a 1990 study by the Social Organization of Sexuality, only 15.7% of women and 34.9% of men who reported some level of same-sex attraction had a homosexual or bisexual identity.

Sexual identity is more closely related to sexual behavior than sexual orientation is. The same survey found that 96% of women and 87% of men with a homosexual or bisexual identity had engaged in sexual activity with someone of the same sex, contrasted with 32% of women and 43% of men who had same-sex attractions. Upon reviewing the results, the organization commented: "Development of self-identification as homosexual or gay is a psychological and socially complex state, something which, in this society, is achieved only over time, often with considerable personal struggle and self-doubt, not to mention social discomfort."

=== Identities ===
- Asexuality is the lack of sexual attraction to others, or low or absent interest in or desire for sexual activity. It may also be categorized more widely to include a broad spectrum of asexual sub-identities. Asexuality is distinct from abstention from sexual activity and from celibacy.
- Aromanticism is defined as "having little or no romantic feeling towards others: experiencing little or no romantic desire or attraction.
- Bisexuality describes a pattern of attraction toward both males and females, or to more than one sex or gender. A bisexual identity does not necessarily equate to equal sexual attraction to both sexes; commonly, people who have a distinct but not exclusive sexual preference for one sex over the other also identify themselves as bisexual.
- Heterosexuality describes a pattern of attraction to persons of the opposite sex. The term straight is commonly used to refer to heterosexuals. Heterosexuals are by far the largest sexual identity group.
- Homosexuality describes a pattern of attraction to other persons of the same sex. The term lesbian is commonly used to refer to homosexual women, and the term gay is commonly used to refer to homosexual men, although gay is sometimes used to refer to women as well.
- Pansexuality describes attraction towards people regardless of their sex or gender identity. Pansexual people may refer to themselves as gender-blind, asserting that gender and sex are not determining factors in their romantic or sexual attraction to others. (Note: The Oxford Dictionary of English defines pansexual as "[n]ot limited in sexual choice with regard to biological sex, gender, or gender identity".) Pansexuality is sometimes considered a type of bisexuality.
- Polysexuality (Note: Not to be confused with polyamory) has been defined as "encompassing or characterized by many different kinds of sexuality", and as sexual attraction to many, but not all, genders. Those who use the term may be doing so as a replacement for the term bisexual, believing bisexual reifies dichotomies. Major monotheistic religions generally prohibit polysexual activity, but some religions incorporate it into their practices. Polysexuality is also considered to be another word for bisexuality however unlike bisexuals, polysexuals are not necessarily attracted to people of the same gender. Polysexuality is under what some people would call the "bisexual umbrella", sometimes seen as the non-monosexual spectrum.
- Sapiosexuality (Note: Not to be confused with "sapphic", an umbrella term for women attracted to women) describes attraction to the intelligence of another person. The prefix sapio- comes from the Latin for "I [have] taste" or "I [have] wisdom" and refers to a person's preferences, proclivities, and common sense. Sapiosexual-identifying individuals can also be gay, straight, or bisexual. It is not a sexual orientation. It first gained mainstream attention in 2014 when dating website OkCupid added it as one of several new sexual orientation and gender identity options. About 0.5% of OkCupid users identify as sapiosexual, and it was most common among those ages 31–40. Women are more likely to identify as sapiosexual than men. Critics responded that sapiosexuality is "elitist", "discriminatory", and "pretentious". OkCupid removed the identity on February 11, 2019, following what it described as "considerable negative feedback".
- Relationship anarchy applies anarchist principles to intimate relationships. Its practice has no norms but tends towards criticism of Western relationship norms, absence of demands and expectations on partners, and lack of distinction between friendships and romantic relationships.

=== Unlabeled sexuality ===
Unlabeled sexuality is when an individual chooses not to label their sexual identity. This identification could stem from one's uncertainty about their sexuality or their unwillingness to conform to a sexuality because they do not necessarily like labels, or they wish to feel free in their attractions instead of feeling forced into same, other, both, or all attractions because of their sexual identity. Identifying as unlabeled could also be because of one's "unwillingness to accept their sexual minority status." Because being unlabeled is the purposeful decision of no sexual identity, it is different from bisexuality or any other sexual identity. Those who are unlabeled are more likely to view sexuality as less stable and more fluid and tend to focus more on the "person, not the gender."

It is reported that some women who identify as unlabeled did so because they are unable or uncertain about the types of relationships they will have in the future. As such, this divergence from sexual labels could provide for a person to be able to more fully realize their "true" sexuality because it frees them from the pressure of liking and being attracted to who their sexual identification dictates they should like. A 2022 empirical qualitative research on the sexual identity management strategies of working women who experience sexual fluidity showed that female employees first consider or choose (non)identity that matches their new sexual attractions. These (non)identity choices include identity change, fluid identity, non-identity, and resisting identity. Next, strategies are utilized for managing that (non)identity at work—pass, cover, implicitly out, explicitly out, inform/educate. These strategies can be used independently or multiply (mixed/change), in which mixed strategy takes account of communication object and situation, while change strategy relies on time. The term pomosexual is also similar to unlabeled in the sense that it defines the rejection of preexisting or mainstream labels.

== Development ==
=== General ===
Most of the research on sexual orientation identity development focuses on the development of people who are attracted to the same sex. Many people who feel attracted to members of their own sex come out at some point in their lives. Coming out is described in three phases. The first phase is the phase of "knowing oneself," and the realization emerges that one is sexually and emotionally attracted to members of one's own sex. This is often described as an internal coming out and can occur in childhood or at puberty, but sometimes as late as age 40 or older. The second phase involves a decision to come out to others, e.g. family, friends, and/or colleagues, while the third phase involves living openly as an LGBT person. In the United States today, people often come out during high school or college age. At this age, they may not trust or ask for help from others, especially when their orientation is not accepted in society. Sometimes they do not inform their own families. Various studies have shown that gender identity can be affected by family conditions, educational environment, society and media. In other words, in conservative societies, people face different challenges to express their gender identity if they have a gender identity different from the norm of the society.

According to Rosario, Schrimshaw, Hunter, Braun (2006), "the development of a lesbian, gay, or bisexual (LGB) sexual identity is a complex and often difficult process. Unlike members of other minority groups (e.g., ethnic and racial minorities), most LGB individuals are not raised in a community of similar others from whom they learn about their identity and who reinforce and support that identity" and "[r]ather, LGB individuals are often raised in communities that are either ignorant of or openly hostile toward homosexuality."

Some individuals with unwanted sexual attractions may choose to actively dis-identify with a sexual minority identity, which creates a different sexual orientation identity from their actual sexual orientation. Sexual orientation identity, but not sexual orientation, can change through psychotherapy, support groups, and life events. A person who has homosexual feelings can self-identify in various ways. An individual may come to accept an LGB identity, to develop a heterosexual identity, to reject an LGB identity while choosing to identify as ex-gay, or to refrain from specifying a sexual identity.

=== Models of sexual identity development ===
Several models have been created to describe coming out as a process for gay and lesbian identity development (e.g. Dank, 1971; Cass, 1984; Coleman, 1989; Troiden, 1989). These historical models have taken a view of sexual identity formation as a sexual-minority process only. However, not every LGBT person follows such a model. For example, some LGBT youth become aware of and accept their same-sex desires or gender identity at puberty in a way similar to which heterosexual teens become aware of their sexuality, i.e. free of any notion of difference, stigma or shame in terms of the gender of the people to whom they are attracted. More contemporary models take the stance that it is a more universal process. Current models for the development of sexual identity attempt to incorporate other models of identity development, such as Marcia's ego-identity statuses.

The Cass identity model, established by Vivienne Cass, outlines six discrete stages transited by individuals who successfully come out: (1) identity confusion, (2) identity comparison, (3) identity tolerance, (4) identity acceptance, (5) identity pride, and (6) identity synthesis. Fassinger's model of gay and lesbian identity development contains four stages at the individual and group level: (1) awareness, (2) exploration, (3) deepening/commitment, and (4) internalization/synthesis.

Some models of sexual identity development do not use discrete, ordered stages, but instead conceptualize identity development as consisting of independent identity processes. For example, D'Augelli's model describes six unordered independent identity processes: (1) exiting heterosexual identity, (2) developing personal LGB identity status, (3) developing an LGB social identity, (4) becoming an LGB offspring, (5) developing an LGB intimacy status, and (6) entering an LGB community.

The Unifying Model of Sexual Identity Development is currently the only model that incorporates heterosexual identity development within its statuses to include compulsory heterosexuality, active exploration, diffusion, deepening and commitment to status, and synthesis.

Contemporary models view sexual identity formation as a universal process, rather than a sexual minority one, in that it is not only sexual minorities that undergo sexual identity development, but heterosexual populations as well. More recent research has supported these theories, having demonstrated that heterosexual populations display all of Marcia's statuses within the domain of sexual identity.

== See also ==
- Androphilia and gynephilia
- Bi-curious
- Erikson's stages of psychosocial development
- Kinsey scale
- Men who have sex with men
- Situational sexual behavior
- Women who have sex with women
