= GaySurfers.net =

LGBT social network website

GaySurfers.com
- Website type: Social network
- Available in: English
- Website: gaysurfers.com
- Commercial: No
- Registration: Optional, required for some features
- Users: About 6000
- Launched: 2010; 16 years ago
- Current status: Active

GaySurfers.net is a global online community that promotes diversity within the surfing community and provide the means for LGBTQ people who are surfers to connect. This social media website was featured in the award-winning documentary film Out in the Lineup.

== History ==
GaySurfers.net was created in 2010 by Thomas Castets, who also produced the Out in the Lineup, a documentary that explores homophobia in the surfing community. Castets, a surfer from Sydney, Australia, created the website hoping to find out if there were any other gay surfers. Within weeks of launching the website, more than 300 surfers contacted him.

== See also ==
- Athlete Ally
- Homosocialization
- You Can Play
