= Eric Michels =

American businessman

- Born: July 2, 1964; Portland, Maine, U.S.
- Died: August 17, 2018 (aged 54); Chessington, England
- Cause of death: Murder by lethal drug overdose
- Occupations: Actor and businessman
- Height: 1.78 m (5 ft 10 in)
- Children: 3

Eric Michels (July 2, 1964 – August 17, 2018) was an American businessman and film actor. He was a human resources executive at the energy company SSE.

== Early life ==
Michels was born in 1964, in the U.S. and moved to Britain in the 1980s.

== Career ==
His acting credits include playing Staff Sergeant James in World War Z (2013) and FBI Operative in Jack Ryan: Shadow Recruit (2014), as well as appearing as an extra in Skyfall (2012).

== Personal life ==
Michels was married and had three children, but the marriage broke up in 2004 and he divorced in 2010.

== Murder ==
Michels was found dead at his home in Chessington on August 18, 2018, by his daughter. He had been murdered in the early hours of August 17 by Gerald Matovu, having been targeted on Grindr. Matovu had written a message to Michels' 14-year-old daughter saying "Hello hun im a little busy talk soon". Matovu, who had previously been convicted of supplying GHB to the serial killer Stephen Port, was found guilty of the murder in July 2019. He was sentenced to life imprisonment with a minimum term of 31 years.

== Filmography ==
- Jack Ryan: Shadow Recruit (2014) as FBI Operative
- World War Z (2013) as Staff Sergeant James
- Skyfall (2012) as Cocktail Party Guest
- First the Bird Fell (2011) as Kenneth Taylor
