= Harmless Hugs =

LGBT rights collective

Harmless Hugs is a young collective working for LGBT rights in India that was started as an online secret LGBT group. Harmless Hugs organised the first LGBT Flashmob in Delhi in 2015 and have been doing it every year since then. Harmless Hugs has also organised four editions of Delhi International Queer Theater and Film Festival (2015, 2016, 2017 and 2018). The 2016 edition had Piyush Mishra as chief guest and had support of Kunal Kapoor and Kalki. Apart from this, the collective organises regular meet ups, informative sessions and plays (in collaboration with Asmita Theatre Group led by Arvind Gaur) to spread awareness about the LGBT rights in India and sensitise the society about the community. Harmless Hugs also launched an anthology of short stories around queer lives in 2016 which was launched by Piyush Mishra. Presently, the collective is managed by Aditya Bondyopadhyay, Naman Verma, Kanav Sahgal, and Rishu Kapur. The collective was founded by Vinay Kumar on 10 September 2012.

== Activities ==
- Flashmobs
- Tarang - Delhi International Queer Theater and Film Festival
- Queer Hugs
- Queer Holi
- Harmless Hugs meets
- Plays
