= Richard Newman (broadcaster) =

British television personality

- Occupations: Gaydar Radio presenter, writer
- Television: Big Brother 7

Richard James Newman is a writer, broadcaster, and reality TV contestant, best known for participating in the seventh series of the British reality television programme Big Brother.

== Early life ==
Though born in the United Kingdom, Newman emigrated with his family to Edmonton, Alberta, in 1976 at the age of five. Newman studied Radio & Television arts at the Northern Alberta Institute of Technology in Edmonton. After graduating he was employed as a traffic co-ordinator at the CKUA Radio Network and eventually went on to write scripts for the station. He then returned to the UK in 1996, moving to London to pursue a career as a writer and broadcaster.

== Big Brother ==
In the summer of 2006, Newman participated in the seventh series of Big Brother, entering the house on Day 1. Richard held the record for most evictions survived at 6, until Freddie "Halfwit" Fisher broke the record with 7 in the tenth series. Newman eventually ended up in the final, placing 4th, after 93 days inside the house. Shortly after, Richard made an appearance on The Charlotte Church Show, Richard & Judy as well as the game show The Mint. Richard was interviewed and photographed by Attitude magazine after leaving the Big Brother house, he also appeared on the cover Boyz magazine wearing his trademark cowboy hat. He went on to host Mr Gay UK that year, and in October 2006 it was announced that Richard would be working as a host on the digital station Gaydar Radio.

In the summer of 2008, Newman made a return to TV appearing alongside fellow housemate Lea Walker on E4's Big Brother's Little Brother.

== Gaydar Radio ==
Newman spent two years at Gaydar Radio where he presented two shows: The Saturday Morning Show and The Dicky & Dolly Show, which he presented every Sunday morning along with fellow Big Brother 7 housemate Lea Walker. During this time, he interviewed celebrities such as Alan Carr, Samantha Fox, Alison Moyet, Kim Wilde, Carol Decker, Immodesty Blaize, Gail Porter, The Puppini Sisters, Margarita Pracatan, Russell Grant, Victoria Wilson James (Soul II Soul), Luciana (Bodyrox) and Russian pop singer Sergey. During his time at Gaydar Radio, the station won the 2007 Sony Radio Award for Digital Station of the year; it was again nominated in 2008. Along with Gaydar Radio, Newman also collected an Arqiva award in 2007 and 2008 for Digital Station of the Year.

== Before Stonewall 25th Anniversary DVD release ==
In May 2009, Newman took part in a panel discussion at the 23rd London Lesbian and Gay Film Festival about the Stonewall riots to be included on the 25th anniversary DVD release of Greta Schiller Emmy Award-winning documentary Before Stonewall released by Peccadillo Pictures. Newman was part of a Q&A session alongside Before Stonewall director Greta Schiller - Film director Richard Kwietniowski (Owning Mahowny & Love And Death On Long Island) - German film director, Monika Treut (Seduction: The Cruel Woman) - Former mayor of London, Ken Livingstone, and British Gay Activist, Alan Wakeman. On the DVD, Newman speaks openly about his own experiences growing up gay and expresses his thoughts on the Stonewall riots that took place on 27 June 1969 when the police raided the Stonewall Inn in New York.

== Published work ==
Newman has since become an accomplished freelance writer contributing mainly to the gay press in the UK, Europe and Canada. He has written for Boyz, QX, Scene 24/7 and Winq Magazine.
