= Manjam.com =

Social Networking website

Manjam
- Website type: Dating website
- Available in: English, Arabic, Chinese, Czech, Danish, Dutch, English, French, German, Greek, Hebrew, Hungarian, Indonesian, Italian, Japanese, Korean, Malaysian, Persian, Polish, Portuguese, Romanian, Russian, Spanish, Swedish, Thai, Turkish, Urdu
- Founded: London, UK
- Creator: Hubjet Limited
- Website: manjam.com
- Commercial: Yes
- Launched: 2004

Manjam was a social networking website that used GPS technology and social discovery to connect mutually attracted gay and bisexual men. With a large proportion of Manjam users based in Europe, the Middle East, and Southeast Asia, the website was translated into 28 different languages. In order to support users from these locations, Manjam had focused on translating the site into right-to-left languages such as Arabic, Hebrew, Persian, and Urdu. To date, Manjam is the first gay social web application targeted exclusively for communities speaking these languages. The site was active from 2004 to 2016, when it shut down.

== History ==
Manjam was founded in October 2004 and was headquartered in London, England. According to its founders, the primary aim of Manjam was to give people in countries where same-sex relationships is criminalized the freedom to connect and express ideas openly without prejudice. According to the news website Techcrunch, Manjam offered listings for accommodation, business, and personal profiles. Free membership allowed users to access the listings, including IM, video, and audio messaging. In countries where many LGBT people experienced abuse, discrimination, honor killings, and murder, a survey of gay Iraqis by Michael Luongo found that Manjam was one of the most frequently used websites to facilitate social interaction.

In 2016, the website shut down and ended all operations.

== Technology ==
Manjam was a cross-platform web application, accessible via the mobile devices web browser. It did not require downloading onto the user's mobile device in order to be accessed. Built using open standards such as HTML5, JavaScript and CSS3, the Manjam web app was designed to work seamlessly across all smartphone, tablet and desktop devices. The web app drew on location-based technology that allowed users to set a specific location and search any other users within their local radius. Manjam used responsive web design to adapt to different screen sizes automatically, thus enabled users to access data across all modern browsers such as Google Chrome, Apple Safari, Microsoft Internet Explorer, and was fully compatible with Apple iOS, Google Android, Windows Phone and BlackBerry.

== Membership ==
Since launching in 2004, more than 2 million members had registered to use the service. 1 million of which were based in Europe. Membership access to Manjam was free, however the site also provided users with a premium subscription-based service called Manjam Gold. Upgrading to Gold granted users access to enhanced features and superpowers such as priority listing, unlimited chat, unlimited contacts, and unlimited views. As of the year 2017, the website is officially closed and is non-functional.

== Visibility ==
According to web traffic data site Alexa Internet, Manjam achieved high online visibility in Middle Eastern countries such as Iran, Egypt, Iraq, Kuwait, Lebanon, and Qatar.

== See also ==
- Homosocialization
