= Gay.com =

Social networking website

- Gay.com as of August 2012.
- Website type: Personals, Chat, News, Social Networking for gay men.
- Available in: English, French, German, Italian, Portuguese and Spanish.
- Owner: VS Media Inc.
- Creator: PlanetOut Inc.
- Revenue: Advertising; membership fee for premium accounts.
- Website: http://www.gay.com/
- Commercial: Yes
- Registration: Required
- Launched: May 1997 (re-launched October 2008)
- Current status: Inactive

Gay.com was a chat, personals, and social networking website catering to the LGBT community. The site was a digital brand of Here Media Inc. In addition to community features, the site featured LGBT-related news and features. As of September 2005, San Jose Mercury News ranked gay.com as the most popular online gay personals site in the United States. As of March 2007, Hitwise ranked it number three in domestic American popularity after Adam4Adam and Manhunt. Gay.com also used to compete internationally with dudesnude, gayromeo, and gaydar.

== History ==
Gay.com was founded by Mark Elderkin in 1994 and launched with a Java-based chat system in 1996. Gay.com's parent company acquired PlanetOut in 2001. In October 2008 the company relaunched gay.com., updating the visual style of the site and replacing the former Java-based chat system. Technical problems caused by the upgrade led to service interruptions and lags. In an open letter from PlanetOut management, "hardware configurations and software code" were cited as culprits. Many users asked the service to revert to its former system, and the formerly solid user base eroded after the relaunch.

In October 2009, Here Media Inc. bought gay.com from PlanetOut Inc.

In 2016, Here Media Inc. partnered with The Veloz Group to redesign gay.com and revitalize the business. Later that year, gay.com was sold to VS Media Inc. Upon purchasing, the site was changed to a webcam model. In 2017, VS Media Inc. donated the domain to the Los Angeles LGBT Center, and it now acts as a redirect to the center's own website.

== See also ==
- Homosocialization
