= Henry Badenhorst =

British businessman (died 2017)

Henry Badenhorst (c. 1966 – 11 November 2017) was the co-founder of the Gaydar Radio website. In May, 2007, Badenhorst was named by the Independent on Sunday Pink List the fourth most influential gay person in the United Kingdom, down from third place the previous year.

Badenhorst's partner was Gary Frisch. Their personal relationship ended in 2006, but they remained business partners until Frisch's death in 2007.

== Death ==
Badenhorst died on 11 November 2017, aged 51, after falling from a tower block in his native South Africa. Initial and unconfirmed reports suggested he took his own life.
