= Mark Elderkin =

American entrepreneur

Mark Elderkin (born September 27, 1963) is an American internet entrepreneur who co-founded the LGBT website Gay.com in 1994. He later served as president of PlanetOut Inc. and, in 2007, founded the advertising company Gay Ad Network.

Elderkin earned a Bachelor of Science in systems engineering from Boston University and a Master of Business Administration from the Haas School of Business at the University of California, Berkeley. Elderkin is married to Jeff Bennett, with whom he co-founded Gay.com. They have a daughter and divide their time between Fort Lauderdale, Florida and West Hollywood, California.

Elderkin co-founded Gay.com in 1994 with Jeff Bennett; the site launched publicly in 1997 and grew into one of the largest online communities for gay men. As an executive vice president and chief operating officer, he oversaw the site's operations. Gay.com's parent company, Online Partners, acquired PlanetOut in 2001, and the combined company completed an initial public offering in October 2004, trading on the Nasdaq under the ticker "LGBT" as the first gay-focused company to go public. Elderkin served as president of the merged company. He left PlanetOut in 2006.

In 2007, Elderkin founded Gay Ad Network, a firm that aggregated audiences across independent LGBT websites in order to sell advertising on their behalf. He characterized the company's model as representing a range of independent publishers rather than only owned-and-operated sites. Early advertisers included Bridgestone, Air New Zealand, Paramount Pictures and Travelocity. The company was later named to the Inc. 5000 list of fast-growing private companies.

Elderkin has served on the boards of GLAAD, Online Partners and Stellar Networks.
