= Gary Frisch =

British businessman (1969–2007)

Gary Frisch (22 January 1969 – 10 February 2007) was co-founder of the Gaydar website. He was one of the UK's leading gay businessmen.

== Early life ==
Frisch was born in Johannesburg South Africa. His father, Eric, was an entrepreneur, and his mother, Rhona, was a bookkeeper. He was educated at Boksburg High School and studied computer science at the University of the Witwatersrand in Johannesburg while working for De Beers' industrial diamond division.

== Career ==
After graduation, he set up a computer software company, Frisoft Software, which he sold to Q Data (now named Business Connection) in 1994. He was a technical director with Q Data until he left South Africa in 1997.

He moved to the UK in 1997 with his partner, Henry Badenhorst, to set up QSoft Consulting, an information technology consultancy firm. After a friend complained that he was too busy to look for a new boyfriend, they launched the Gaydar internet dating website in November 1999 from their home in Twickenham. The website rapidly became very popular and by 2007, Gaydar had nearly 4 million users in 23 countries. The Gaydar brand expanded into other areas: Frisch was chairman of GaydarRadio, a digital radio station founded in 2002.

Badenhorst and Frisch's personal partnership broke up in 2006, although they remained business partners.

== Death ==
Frisch was found dead below the window of his eighth-floor flat in Wandsworth, South London. A verdict of misadventure was recorded by Paul Knapman, the coroner at the inquest. A pathologist, Peter Wilkins, said raised levels of ketamine were found in Frisch's blood and liver.
