= Delhi International Queer Theater and Film Festival =

LGBTQ film festival in India

The Delhi International Queer Theater and Film Festival (DIQTFF), is a queer cultural festival curating films, plays, talks and performances (dance & drag). It is organised by a queer collective in Delhi called Harmless Hugs. The film festival is intended to connect with larger diaspora of the Indian LGBTQ struggle for equal human rights and to reach out to masses via omnipotence of Media, Theatre and Cinema. Movie screenings and plays are well complemented by a round of panel discussions and debates, including some of the biggest names from the Indian LGBTQ Movement. Discussions around tumultuous territories of politics, gender disparity, coming out and involvement of families and more will also be a part of this two-day event, that is happening every December since its initiation in 2015.

== History ==
The Festival was created by Vinay Kumar (Founder Harmless Hugs). Harsh Agarwal (President 2015–16) served as the convener for first two editions.

The first edition of this queer festival was organised in 2015. It received support from High Commission of Canada in Delhi, along with Youth LEAD and GLIFAA.

The second edition of the festival in 2016 received support from Love Matters, High Commission of Canada, Impulse (AIDS Healthcare Foundation), SCRUFF and other organisations. The event received support Bollywood actors like Kalki, Kunal Kapoor while Piyush Mishra performed at the event.

The Third Edition was organised in 2017 with the support of Impulse (AIDS Healthcare Foundation) and several other organisations.

The fourth edition was organised as TARANG- DIQTFF in 2018 with support of High Commission of Canada, India HIV/AIDS Alliance, Samarth and several other organisations.

== The Festival ==
=== TARANG- Delhi International Queer Theater & Film Festival (2018) ===
The 4th edition of festival took place on 1 and 2 December 2018 at Pyarey Lal Bhavan, Bahadur Shah Zafar Marg, New Delhi. The event was primarily organised by Harmless Hugs with support from various organisations like Canada High Commission, Samarth, India HIV/AIDS Alliance, Ketto, The Humsafar Trust, Miss Woomaniya, LGBT Events India, and others. This festival saw street theatre performances on HIV, various plays related to LGBTQ+ like Lihaaf/Ehsaas, Mard, Anhad e Kathak (a dance drama on HIV/AIDS) and films like How Was Your Day, Zara Nazar Utha Ke, Misswomania and more. As for the talks and discussions, Simran Shaikh, Arvind Gaur and Sonal Mehta were some of the speakers at the festival. There were a bunch of other musical and theatrical performances too. The festival sought to bring a local flavour to the queer movement and was inspired by Mumbai's Queer Film Fest Kashish organised by Sridhar Rangayan. Tarang's aim was to showcase queer arts through several mediums and it staged queer-themed plays such as Pehchaan, Dastak, Mard, Lihaaf, Ehsaas, The Legend of Ila, Anhad e Kathak.

==== Movies Screened ====
1. A safe space to talk to
2. Reset
3. How was your day
4. Vaddis
5. Ankahee
6. Please Mind the Gap
7. The Father's Project
8. Before Today
9. I am not there
10. Zara Nazar Utha ke
11. The Notion
12. Turn it Around
13. Heather has four Moms
14. Two Words
15. Khwaaish
16. Miss Womaniya
17. Bag
18. Orizaba's Peak

==== Plays and performances ====
1. Mard
2. Zahiri Haqeeqat
3. Pehchaan

=== DIQTFF TAKE 3 (2017) ===
The 3rd edition of the festival took place on 9 and 10 December 2017 at Shah Auditorium, Civil Lines, New Delhi. The event was primarily organised by Harmless Hugs and Impulse New Delhi by AIDS Healthcare Foundation with support from various organisations like Canada High Commission, Asmita Theater Group, Ketto, Adhikaar Trust, Grindr, Doggy Style, DU Beat, Miss Woomaniya, Art Culture Festival and ED Times

==== Movies Screened ====
1. The Condom Man (English)
2. A thousand years of Love (English)

==== Plays and performances ====
1. Mard (Hindi Play)
2. Astitva (Hindi Play)

=== DIQTFF 2 (2016) ===
The second edition of the festival took place on 10 and 11 December 2016 at NCUI Auditorium and Convention Centre, New Delhi The event was organised by Harmless Hugs & Love Matters with support from various organisations like SCRUFF, AIDS Healthcare Foundation, High Commission of Canada, India HIV/AIDS Alliance, Ketto, DU Beat, Humsafar Trust, The Education Tree, Respect Women, Youth Lead India, UNDERGROUND Eagles. The Chief guest for the event was famous Bollywood actor and singer Piyush Mishra, who gave a performance too. In an interview with convener Harsh Aggarwal, he said, “I see no difference in the homosexual and heterosexual community. They have given me same respect, same love and affection that I get anywhere else I go. If there is something unnatural, the nature won't let it exist. It's the conflict of the nature and society which we now observe where society is calling nature unnatural which is ironic.”

The event was inaugurated by many notable personalities like Prince Manvendra, Jess Dutton (Deputy High Commissioner from Canada to India), Vithika Yadav (Country Head, Love Matters India) and Vinay Kumar (founder of Harmless Hugs). This festival was also supported by Bollywood actors like Kunal Kapoor and Kalki Koechlin through video message. The event also saw a photo exhibition by Katharina Domscheit D’souza. Besides, a free HIV testing and health awareness camp was organised by Impulse India, Project Samarth and Hamsafar Trust. Bismaya Kumar Raulo from Impulse New Delhi said "Stigma attached to sexual orientation and sexual preferences have been a major challenge in the society. Platforms like Delhi International Queer Theatre and Film Festival is a unique way to reach out to the society and advocate for equal rights for everyone regardless of sex, gender, and sexuality. It also gives an opportunity to the people who are in the closet and still fighting with their identity. Let's work together for a better and brighter future of the LGBTQIA community in India”

==== Movies Screened ====
1. Underneath the Makeup, there's me (English)
2. Lihaaf (Hindi/Urdu)
3. That's my boy (Malayalam)
4. AMORfo (Spanish)
5. In the mood of Love (English)
6. An open Wind (English)
7. That's my boy (English)
8. My Child is Gay (English)
9. Boy Meets Boy (English)

==== Plays and performances ====
1. Meeta ki Kahani (Hindi Play)
2. Libaas (Hindi Play)
3. Pehchaan (Hindi Play)
4. I step on air (English Performance)

=== DIQTFF (2015) ===
The first edition of the festival took place on 12 and 13 December 2015 at Lok Kala Manch, Lodi Institutional Area, New Delhi. The event was primarily organised by Harmless Hugs with support from organisations like AIDS Healthcare Foundation, High Commission of Canada, GLIFFAA and others.There were seven plays and fourteen films, including Under The Shade (2013), directed by J.M. Hall, as well as talks by activists.
