= Delta App =

LGBTQ networking and support app in India

Delta was an Indian homegrown networking and support app for the LGBT community in India. Co-founded by Ishaan Sethi.

The application is no longer available on the iOS store. Official Twitter and Instagram accounts have not been updated since 2022. The service appears to be defunct.

== About Delta ==
The app allows members of the LGBTQ community to find friendly spaces and professionals. It was developed by Ishaan Sethi who is also the CEO. The need to create such an app was due to discrimination of people in public hence extortion, sexual abuse, blackmail and unsolicited sex on gay dating apps. After coming out in 2010 while in the US, Seth felt isolated after his move back to India hence started Delta app.

Initially, he crowd funded about Rs 10 lakh and raised Rs 2 crore from investors such as Keshav Suri, Truly Madly's Sachin Bhatia, celebrity chef and restaurateur Ritu Dalmia and Vivek Sahni, CEO & Co-Founder, Kama Ayurveda. The app was launched in 2018.

The app currently has more than 50,000 users. The app has different features as it is more than a dating app. It is also a space where the LGBTQ community can connect and support each other. The dating feature is known as 'Connect'. There is a feature for networking and brand promotion.
