= Asia Pacific Coalition on Male Sexual Health =

Asian LGBT health organization

The Asia Pacific Coalition on Male Sexual Health, also known as APCOM, is a network of non-profit organizations which share the mission of improving male sexual health in South Asia, East Asia, and the Pacific Islands.

== History ==
APCOM was launched in July 2007 after delegates to the Delhi 2006 International Consultation on Male Sexual Health and HIV in Asia and the Pacific identified a need for more organization in the field of male sexual health.

APCOM was founded as an autonomous, regional coalition of citizen groups, government representatives, funders, technical consultants and the United Nations officials. Its mission is to assist local organizations in advocacy for the rights of MSMs and transgender males.
