= Gingerbeer (web community) =

London-based virtual community for lesbian and bisexual women

Gingerbeer was a London-based virtual community for lesbian and bisexual women. The name "Gingerbeer" (Cockney rhyming slang for "queer") referred to both the web site, and to the community, which it supported. It was maintained and moderated entirely by a team of volunteers.

Gingerbeer was initially launched on 1 January 2000, and underwent two subsequent relaunches, firstly on 25 June 2001 and later on 11 November 2005, following a major redesign. Gingerbeer became an official not-for-profit organisation in March 2004, when it was registered as a limited company by guarantee.

The site's main feature was a highly active messageboards forum, with over 2,000 registered members in May 2007. In the eighteen months to the end of May 2007, they logged over 335,000 posts in over 5000 topics or discussion threads. One of the distinctive features of the messageboards was that they supported an active calendar of social, cultural and sporting events across the UK, so that Gingerbeer existed as both a web community and a real-life community.

Besides the messageboards, Gingerbeer offered listings of bars, clubs and community events, reviews, and a London guide. Gingerbeer was recommended as a useful resource for lesbians by some travel guides. Gingerbeer ceased to exist in November 2018.

== See also ==
- Homosocialization
