= Cass identity model =

Theory of LGBTQIA+ identity development

The Cass identity model is one of the fundamental theories of LGBT identity development, developed in 1979 by Vivienne Cass. This model was one of the first to treat LGBTQIA+ people as normal in a heterosexist society and in a climate of homophobia and biphobia instead of treating homosexuality and bisexuality themselves as a problem. Cass described a process of six stages of LGBTQIA+ identity development. While these stages are sequential, some people might revisit stages at different points in their lives.

== The six stages of Cass' models ==
=== Identity confusion ===
In the first stage, identity confusion, the person is amazed to think of themselves as a queer person. "Could I be queer?" This stage begins with the person's first awareness of homosexual or bisexual thoughts, feelings, and attractions. The people typically feel confused and experience turmoil.

To the question "Who am I?", the answers can be acceptance, psychological self-denial and repression, or rejection.

=== Denial ===
This is a sub-stage where one will deny homosexuality. Possible responses can be: to avoid information about homosexuals or bisexuals; inhibited behavior; self-denial of homosexuality and bisexuality ("experimenting", "an accident", "just drunk", "just looking"). The possible needs can be: the person may explore internal positive and negative judgments. Will be allowed to be uncertain regarding sexual identity. May find support in knowing that sexual behavior occurs along a spectrum. May receive permission and encouragement to explore sexual identity as a normal experience (like career identity and social identity).

=== Identity comparison ===
The second stage is called identity comparison. In this stage, the person accepts the possibility of being homosexual or bisexual and examines the wider implications of that tentative commitment. "Maybe this does apply to me." The self-alienation becomes isolation. The task is to deal with the social alienation.

Possible responses can be: the person may begin to grieve for losses and the things they give up by embracing their sexual orientation (marriage, children). They may compartmentalize their own sexuality—accept lesbian/gay definition of behavior but maintain "heterosexual" identity. Tells oneself, "It's only temporary"; "I'm just in love with this particular woman/man"; etc.

The possible needs can be: will be very important that the person develops own definitions. Will need information about sexual identity, LGBTQIA+ community resources, encouragement to talk about loss of heterosexual life expectations. May be permitted to keep some "heterosexual" identity (as "not an all or none" issue).

=== Identity tolerance ===
In the third stage, identity tolerance, the person comes to the understanding they are "not the only one".

The person acknowledges they are likely homosexual or bisexual and seeks out other homosexual or bisexual people to combat feelings of isolation. Increased commitment to being homosexual or bisexual. The task is to decrease social alienation by seeking out homosexual or bisexual people.

Possible responses can be: beginning to have language to talk and think about the issue. Recognition that being homosexual or bisexual does not preclude other options. Accentuate difference between self and heterosexuals. Seek out LGBTQIA+ culture (positive contact leads to more positive sense of self, negative contact leads to devaluation of the culture, stops growth). The person may try out variety of stereotypical roles.

The possible needs can be: to be supported in exploring own shame feelings derived from heterosexism, as well as internalized homophobia and biphobia. Receive support in finding positive homosexual or bisexual community connections. It is particularly important for the person to know community resources. There are many ways you can get support. Examples include LGBTQIA+ clubs, organizations for the LGBTQIA+ community.

=== Identity acceptance ===
The identity acceptance stage means the person accepts themselves. "I will be okay." The person attaches a positive connotation to their homosexual or bisexual identity and accepts rather than tolerates it. There is continuing and increased contact with the LGBTQIA+ culture. The task is to deal with inner tension of no longer subscribing to society's norm, attempt to bring congruence between private and public view of self.

Possible responses can be: accepts homosexual or bisexual self-identification. May compartmentalize "LGBTQIA+ life". Maintain less and less contact with heterosexual community. Attempt to "fit in" and "not make waves" within the LGBTQIA+ community. Begin some selective disclosures of sexual identity. More social coming out; more comfortable being seen with groups of men or women that are identified as "gay". More realistic evaluation of situation.

The possible needs can be: continue exploring grief and loss of heterosexual life expectation, continue exploring internalized homophobia and biphobia (learned shame from heterosexist society). Find support in making decisions about where, when, and to whom to disclose.

=== Identity pride ===
In the identity pride stage, sometimes the coming out of the closet arrives, and the main thinking is "I've got to let people know who I am!" The person divides the world into heterosexuals and queers, and is immersed in LGBTQIA+ culture while minimizing contact with heterosexuals. Us-them quality to political/social viewpoint. The task is to deal with the incongruent views of heterosexuals.

Possible responses include: splits world into "gay" (good) and "straight" (bad)—experiences disclosure crises with heterosexuals as they are less willing to "blend in"—identify LGBTQIA+ culture as sole source of support, acquiring all gay friends, business connections, social connections.

The possible needs can be: to receive support for exploring anger issues, to find support for exploring issues of heterosexism, to develop skills for coping with reactions and responses to disclosure to sexual identity, and to resist being defensive.

=== Identity synthesis ===
The last stage in Cass' model is identity synthesis: the person integrates their sexual identity with all other aspects of self, and sexual orientation becomes only one aspect of self rather than the entire identity.

The task is to integrate LGBTQIA+ identity so that instead of being the identity, it is an aspect of self.

Possible responses can be: continues to be angry at heterosexism, but with decreased intensity, or allows trust of others to increase and build. LGBTQIA+ identity is integrated with all aspects of "self". The person feels "all right" to move out into the community and not simply define space according to sexual orientation. This is a normal feeling.

== Criticisms of the model ==
Joanne Kaufman and Cathryn Johnson have argued that based upon more recent research, this model is less valid today than it was at its inception for several reasons:

1. This model does not take into account socio-cultural factors that can impact identity development.
2. The nature of the social stigma and its management practices have changed since the inception of the model.
3. The linear nature of the model would suggest that anyone who abandons the model or fails to go through each of the six stages would not be able to be considered as a well adjusted queer person, which may no longer be true.

== See also ==
- Coming out
- Homosocialization
- Fassinger's model of gay and lesbian identity development
- Labeling theory
- Sexual orientation

== Books ==
- Vivienne Cass (1979, 1984, 1990). In Ritter and Terndrup (2002) Handbook of Affirmative Psychotherapy with Lesbians and Gay Men
