= PlanetOut =

Defunct American LGBT online media company

PlanetOut, Inc.
- Type: Public
- Founded: 1995
- Defunct: 2009
- Successor: Here Media
- Headquarters: San Francisco, California, United States
- Key people: Tom Rielly (Founder/CEO); Jon Huggett (CEO); Megan Smith (CEO); Karen Magee (CEO); Lowell Selvin (Chairman); Mark Elderkin (Founder of Gay.com)
- Products: Gay.com; PlanetOut.com; The Advocate; Out
- Number of employees: 131
- Website: PlanetOutInc.com

PlanetOut, Inc. was an American online media and entertainment company that targeted the lesbian, gay, bisexual, and transgender (LGBT) community.

It was founded in 1995 by Tom Rielly as an early internet-based media company. PlanetOut began as an independent content provider with a forum on the Microsoft Network (MSN) and also offered services through America Online (AOL).

PlanetOut operated several prominent LGBT-focused platforms, including Gay.com and PlanetOut.com, and later acquired well-known print publications such as The Advocate and Out.

In 2009, PlanetOut merged with Here Networks and Regent Entertainment Media to form Here Media.

== History ==
PlanetOut launched in August 1995 on the Microsoft Network (MSN). It was founded by Tom Rielly alongside a core team of early staff members, including Darren Nye (MSN Producer and Community Director), Christian Williams (Technical Director), Jenni Olson (Arts & Entertainment Producer, PopcornQ), Greg Gordon (News Producer), David Stazer (NetQuery developer), Mary Salome, and Eric Mueller.

In April 1996, with Rielly serving as President and Jon Huggett as CEO, PlanetOut Inc. closed its first round of funding—a $3 million minority investment from Sequoia Capital and America Online. In September 1996, PlanetOut expanded its services to the web.

By late 1996, internal challenges related to management culture and strategic direction began affecting the company. Rielly was removed as president, and in January 1997, Sequoia Capital withdrew its investment. Most other investors, including AOL, continued to support the company. Following the leadership shake-up, Huggett departed, and Rielly temporarily returned as CEO.

Later during the Dot-com bubbleburst, PlanetOut merged with Online Partners, the parent company of Gay.com, and the combined company was renamed PlanetOut Partners Inc. The newly formed company became profitable, primarily through both personals launched just prior to the merger by the PlanetOut team and launched Gay.com's subscription-based membership and online advertising revenue from both sites. It went public in October 2004, with Lowell Selvin as CEO and Gay.com founder Mark Elderkin as president.

Despite early success, the company began to struggle financially. At the end of 2006, it reported a net loss of $3.7 million on revenues of $68.6 million. While this represented a 93% improvement over 2005 revenues, the acquisition of RSVP Vacations marked a turning point that signaled further financial decline.

In April 2008, PlanetOut announced a letter of intent to sell its publishing division (LPI) and specialty publications to Regent Releasing, the parent company of Here! Films.
