= Gaydar Radio =

Podcast and former digital radio station

Coordinates: 51.4617°N 0.3045°W

GaydarRadio
- United Kingdom

Programming
- Format: House, dance and pop music; gay-oriented news and entertainment

Ownership
- Owner: QSoft Consulting

GaydarRadio is a podcast on Mixcloud streaming service. However it used to be a British digital radio station for gay men, lesbians and gay friendly people which had broadcast on DAB multiplexes in London and Brighton and also online. It was broadcast 24 hours a day, with live programming from 5am to midnight during the week, 7am to midnight at weekends.

GaydarRadio, which was based in Twickenham in the London Borough of Richmond upon Thames, ceased broadcasting on Monday 7 January 2013 when the station's DAB channels were acquired by Gaydio.

== Format ==
The station played a mix of dance and mainstream pop music, interspersed with chat and news. In contrast to much of the UK radio industry, the editorial focus is on personality rather than a strictly formatted music mix. This more relaxed style allows the presenters to talk with their listeners about gay life.

The music became more club-orientated during the late evenings and also at the weekend when Club Nation presents the best feel good music non stop. This music policy also got the station a huge following from the straight community.

The station encouraged interaction between presenters and listeners via text, email and online. It had a reach of 488,470 (Ipsos MORI/Rajar 18 May – 26 July 2010) listeners a week in the UK, plus another 2.2 million listening online around the world.

GaydarRadio was based in Twickenham in South West London, in a building called Queen's House, a name that provided a frequent source of amusement for the presenters.

In October 2007 the station relaunched its website as part of GaydarNation and the following month launched GaydarRadio Jukebox offering music downloads of its most popular tracks and exclusive mixes. GaydarRadio Jukebox ceased to exist in 2009, and has since been re-branded as part of 'CD Pool Sixpack' by its parent company.

In the autumn of 2011, GaydarRadio completely re-branded its online offering, removing the GaydarNation brand and merging the lifestyle portal with the main radio website. The refocussed GaydarRadio online brand now focusses almost entirely on gay news and music related showbiz news.

Gaydar Radio closed down in 2013 and its frequencies were transferred to Gaydio.

== Former schedule ==
- Early Breakfast ran between 5am and 7am, presented by Addison White.
- Breakfast ran between 7am and 11am and was co-presented by Neil Sexton and Debbie Ryan, featuring a multitude of seasonal or themed competitions and 'The Coming Out Story', which told the story of a listener's contributed experience of coming out to friends and relatives. The show was heavily driven by audience contributions via Twitter, email and SMS, with a host of regular correspondents. Regular contributors share the latest news and events from their corner of Gay UK, with Andre Harmsworth, from national newspaper 'Metro' giving a showbiz round up every Thursday and John Kennedy O'Connor reporting from the USA on live events such as the Golden Globe Awards, the Oscars and the Grammy Awards. The show was broadcast live Monday to Friday, with a prerecorded Saturday show.
- Simon "The Legend" Le Vans presented the morning show, taking requests and looking for a "daily threesome" where listeners were invited to suggest a selection of tracks appropriate to a topical oddball news story.
- "Producer Robin" Crowley presented afternoons from 2-6 playing music.
- Phil Marriott presented the latest new music for GayUK weekday evenings from 6-10pm. Phil also ran the station's Friday mix show, branded 'Club Nation'.
- Tony English presented Saturday night's Club Nation.
- Weekend shows started with Robin Crowley then Neil and Debbie, with Simon Le Vans, Tony English, Phil Marriott, Andrei Harmsworth and Matt Crabb also presenting their own shows along with through-the-night broadcasts from live London gay clubs.

== Management ==
- The Programme Controller was Robin Crowley ("Producer Robin")
- The Station Engineer was Quentin Nield ("The Pocket-sized Engineer").
- Senior Presenter was Simon Le Vans.
- The Station Producer was Neil Sexton.
- The Music Controller was Phil Marriott.

== History ==
The first proposals for an audio stream on the Gaydar website came from broadcaster Mark Ovenden and radio engineer Quentin Nield. Ovenden was at the time working at the Ministry of Sound Radio and set up a meeting in Spring 2000 between the owners of Gaydar and his boss James Bethel. Bethel proposed to provide the service to Gaydar for £100,000 annually.

Instead GaydarRadio was started in 2001 as an internet-only station, being an audio offshoot of the dating website and independent of outside assistance. According to the first station director Jamie Crick, the entire station was originally played off a single PC on a table propped up with a gay clubbing directory.

Following its success, it moved onto the Sky platform in 2002 before leaving on 18 February 2011 after a "substantial decline" in its audience figures through the platform. Meanwhile, another gay radio station called Purple Radio, which launched a few months before then, Gaydar Radio with the backing of Kelvin MacKenzie and Lord Waheed Alli, was broadcasting as part of a bouquet of services provided by the Digital Radio Group (then part of the GWR Group). Purple was run from the Hanover Grand nightclub and tried a number of pioneering nightly broadcasts from gay bars and clubs but this proved far too costly and the station took the decision to merge with Gaydar Radio. Gaydar Radio took the decision not to continue with Purple Radio as a separate output and put in a successful submission to the Radio Authority to take over Purple's frequency, and gained a DAB outlet on the London 3 Digital multiplex in 2004.

In 2003 while Bethel was working at Capital Radio group, Gaydar Radio was part of a successful application to be on the Sussex Coast DAB multiplex – part of this deal was an unrealised provisional agreement for the Capital group to find space to add the GaydarRadio service to its bouquet available on the Greater Manchester multiplex.

In 2006 the station won Best Radio Station at the BT Digital Music Awards.

At the 2007 Sony Radio Academy Awards (the UK Broadcasting "Oscars"), GaydarRadio went on to win Digital Terrestrial Station of the Year. It also collected the same award at the 2007 and 2008 Commercial Radio 'Arqiva' Awards.

On 3 January 2013 QSoft announced that the DAB licences for London and the Sussex Coast would be transferred to Gaydio from 7 AM on 7 January 2013. The Twickenham studio would be closed and all programming would be controlled from Manchester.

On 4 January 2013, during Gaydar Radio's live broadcasting hours between 7 AM and 10 PM, the presenters and fans celebrated an emotional goodbye. Phil Marriott, who was on air between 6 and 10 PM on weekdays extended his last show by 1 hour. Live broadcasting on the station ended at 11 PM on 4 January, with the weekend consisting of pre-recorded material and automated playlists.

In the final breakfast show, Gaydio's John Ryan assured listeners that they can expect a similar playlist from Gaydio and that due to the licence requirements for the station's FM frequency in Manchester, there would be local opt outs. Gaydio would also provide streaming on the Gaydar dating websites.

== Presenters ==
There were several presenters, many of them listed earlier in this article.

== Reporters ==
- John Kennedy O'Connor

== Former presenters ==
- Richard Newman
- Stuart Miles

== See also ==
- Gaydar (website)
