= Dbna =

German-language forum for gay men

- Formation: 1997
- Website: dbna.com

Dbna was a German-language platform for gay, bisexual and otherwise queer teenagers and men aged 14 to 29. It combines a social network with a forum and an online magazine covering culture and sexual health. The social network prohibits nudity, and all photos uploaded are checked by moderators. Users can ask questions on the forum anonymously. According to Dbna, it has over 30,000 users. It shut down on July 18, 2024.

== Name ==
The name derives from the German Du bist nicht allein, meaning "you are not alone".

== History ==
Dbna was founded in 1997. In 2009, it was nominated for the Grimme Online Award.

== See also ==
- PlanetRomeo
