= Sniffies =

Gay cruising web app

- Website type: Cruising web app
- Country of origin: United States
- Founder: Blake Gallagher
- Website: sniffies.com
- Commercial: Yes
- Registration: Optional
- Launched: 2018
- Current status: Active

Sniffies is a map-based hookup app for gay, bisexual, and bi-curious men.

The website features a map that shows the approximate locations of nearby users who are currently active or have recently been active on the platform. The map also shows the locations of groups and popular meeting places in the user's area. Users can browse the map to view profiles, chat, and share pictures with potential sex partners in their area. Sniffies does not require registration to use; however, certain features require free registration. Sniffies Plus, a paid subscription tier, removes advertisements and enables additional features such as hosting groups, chat pinning, and more granular user-blocking controls.

== History ==
The website was launched in 2018 by its founder, Blake Gallagher, in Seattle, Washington. In 2021, the marketing officer for the company stated that the name "Sniffies" originated from a previous website for trading underwear, later evolving to mean "sniffing out what's around" and "sniffing out the fun". However, in 2022, Gallagher stated that this claim was a rumor and explained that the name "Sniffies" was chosen because it was "just an evocative and available domain name".

In March 2020, Sniffies launched a campaign to urge users to avoid in-person hookups due to the COVID-19 pandemic, while introducing a beta video chat feature called LivePlay to support social distancing. In 2024, Sniffies introduced two new features. In January, the site launched "vanilla mode", which allows users to browse more discreetly by blurring explicit images. In late April, the site introduced "cruiser filters", allowing users to refine their searches based on criteria including age, sexual position, body type, and penis size.

An official Sniffies iOS app was released in March 2025 for users in the United States and Canada. However, the app lacked the anonymity features available on its website, and to comply with Apple's App Store content policies, the app defaulted to "vanilla mode". In May 2025, Apple removed the Sniffies iOS app from the App Store; Sniffies stated the removal was temporary and attributed it to "ongoing content restrictions". The company stated the app continued to function for existing users, and its web app remained fully operational.

In April 2026, Match Group announced a $100 million minority investment in Sniffies. The agreement included an option for Match Group to acquire the remaining equity at a later date, while Sniffies would continue to be founder-led and operate independently. In mid-2026, Sniffies replaced its real-time public message boards ("walls") for cruising locations with AI-generated summaries, which drew criticism from users.

== Reception ==
Mashable named the app "the best hookup site for gay men" in March 2025. In April 2026, Sniffies was reported to have approximately 3 million monthly active users. As of September 2026, its X account sported 194,000 followers, against Grindr's 440,000.

== Sniffies HUSH ==
In 2020, Sniffies introduced Sniffies HUSH, an original content platform and online store that operates separately from the main application. The site includes a lifestyle blog that publishes essays and articles on gay culture, cruising, romantic relationships, and sexual health and well-being. In 2024, HUSH also started producing Cruising Confessions, a podcast featuring interviews and stories from guests about their experiences with queer sex, relationships, and cruising. Sniffies also uses HUSH as their online store, selling Sniffies-branded merchandise, including clothing, swimwear, athletic gear, and accessories.

== See also ==
- Squirt.org
- Cruising for sex
- Comparison of online dating services
- List of LGBTQ social networking services
