= JOYclub =

Online dating service

- Website type: Internet dating
- Available in: English, German, Spanish, Dutch, Italian, French, Czech
- Founded: 1999
- Country of origin: Germany
- Website: www.joyclub.com
- Users: 4.4 mln

JOYclub is an online dating service and sex-positive community for sexual contacts. The site provides events, dating, communication, content sharing, and forums for people of different genders and sexual orientations. There is also an online magazine and a section with pornographic films.

== History ==
JOYclub was founded in 1999 as an internet forum. Since 2013, JOYclub has been a main product of F&P GmbH. In 2013, JOYclub got a Venus Award in the category "Best Erotic-Community".

In 2015, the development of JOYCE, the JOYclub application, began. It was launched in 2017.

In 2019, the site had three million members and four million in 2021.

In 2020, the site started working in Spain. In 2020, during the COVID-19 restrictions JOYclub offered Italians the premium subscription for free to connect more actively online and share private photos, videos etc. In 2021, JOYclub was launched in France. In 2022, JOYclub started in Mexico as well as in the UK.

JOYclub conducts various surveys on sexuality among its users. According to the book Online-Dating fur Dummies JOYclub has a strict authentication and identity verification procedure.

== Security and privacy ==
In December 2021, JOYclub received a certificate for tested data protection from TÜV Saarland. JOYclub offers both a possibility to send messages via Messenger without an indication of the user's phone number and to completely communicate via the platform with no need to switch to other messengers.
