= Fridae =

LGBTQ media company

Fridae (匯樂)
- Industry: Media and personal services
- Founded: 2001
- Headquarters: Hong Kong
- Website: fridae.asia

Fridae (in Chinese 匯樂) is a diversified media and services company specializing in serving the LGBT community in Asia. Its strategy covers the Internet, Broadcasting, Publishing and Events.

The name "Fridae" is inspired by "Man Friday" from Daniel Defoe's novel Robinson Crusoe.

Its online presence is at the Fridae.Asia portal, offering news, city guides, opinion articles and personals. The site is currently published in English, Traditional Chinese and Simplified Chinese. It provides content, community and commerce to more than 400,000 consumers each month. "Perks" is a premium paid service.

Since 1 April 2015, Fridae is owned and operated by DragonStack.

Fridae has since released applications for both iOS and Android devices. Available to download for free on Apple app store and Play Store, the application uses geolocation which allows the user to browse other people in their close proximity.

== See also ==
- List of social networking websites
- PLUN.ASIA
