= Gaydio =

Coordinates: 53.4781°N 2.238191°W

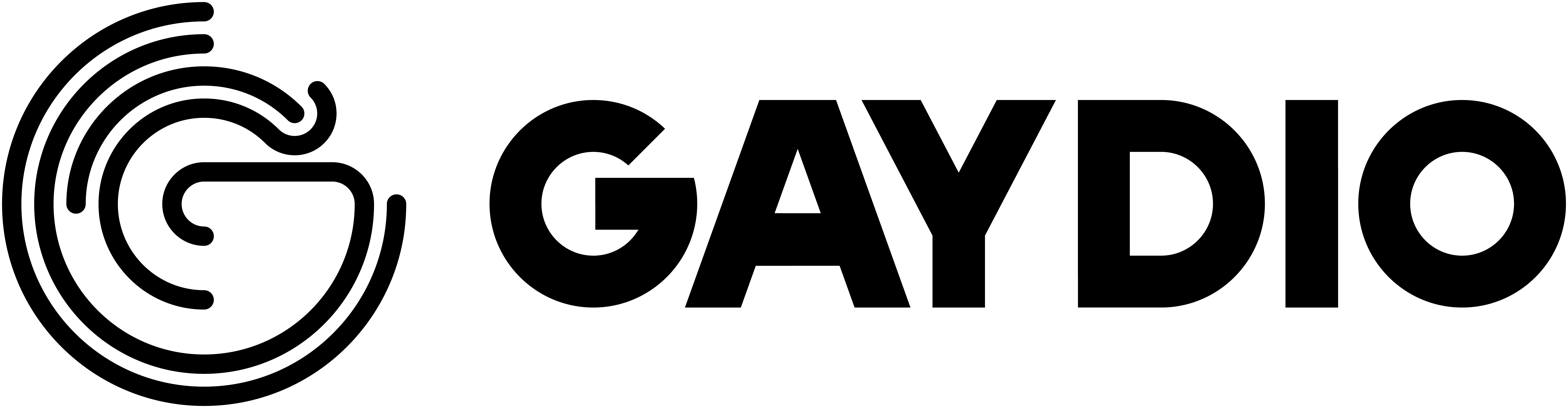
- Manchester, Brighton; United Kingdom
- Broadcast area: United Kingdom
- Frequencies: FM: 88.4 MHz (Manchester); FM: 97.8 MHz (Brighton); DAB: 7D (Portsmouth); DAB: 7D (Brighton); DAB:7D/8A/10B/9B (Greater Manchester); DAB:11B (London); DAB: 9A/9C/8A (Birmingham); DAB: 8B (Glasgow); DAB: 9D (Edinburgh); DAB: 10D (Cardiff); DAB: 12D/9B (Bristol); DAB: 9C (Sheffield); DAB: 9A (Leeds); DAB: 8A (Newcastle); DAB: 7D (Liverpool)
- Branding: The UK's LGBTQ+ Station

Programming
- Format: CHR/Pop

Ownership
- Owner: Gaydio Community Interest Company

History
- First air date: 14 August 2006

Links
- Website: http://www.gaydio.co.uk

Gaydio is a radio station for the lesbian, gay, bisexual, transgender and queer (LGBTQ+) community in the United Kingdom, and is broadcast on 88.4 FM in Greater Manchester, 97.8 FM in Brighton, on DAB digital radio in Greater London, parts of the Home Counties, Manchester, Stockport, Brighton, Birmingham, Glasgow, Cardiff, Edinburgh, Leeds, Liverpool, Sheffield, Bristol, Newcastle upon Tyne and Portsmouth, and online through its website, mobile apps, Smart Speakers and the UK Radio Player.

Gaydio became the UK's first LGBTQ+ FM radio service when it launched full-time on Friday 18 June 2010, expanding into digital radio when it acquired the DAB licences formerly owned by Gaydar Radio in 2013.

Since October 2018, a separate company, Gaydio Brighton, also operates a service in Brighton on 97.8FM and DAB Radio. The majority of Gaydio is networked with several content splits and bespoke local programming in Brighton and Manchester. Gaydio has presented the annual Gaydio Awards since 2023.

== History ==
Founded in 2006 by Ian Wallace and Toby Whitehouse, Gaydio originally launched as a 4-week pop up FM station to broadcast over the Manchester Pride festival. After this trial, the station went on to complete a further three short term broadcasts and, in 2006, a joint broadcast on BBC Radio Manchester's DAB platform to mark World AIDS Day on 1 December.

Gaydio decided to submit an Ofcom application for a full term licence which was granted on 7 November 2008 when Ofcom announced that Gaydio had been awarded a 5-year full-time community service FM licence. This made Gaydio the first full-time LGBTQ+ service to win such a licence. The station launched their full time service on 18 June 2010, with presenter Nicksy and The Black Eyed Peas, "I Gotta Feeling" being the launch song. The community radio licence has subsequently been renewed in 2015 and 2020, each for a further 5 year period.

== Relaunch ==
Gaydio relaunched as a national station on Monday 7 January 2013 following the acquisition of DAB radio licences previously owned by Gaydar Radio owners QSoft. The station holds the original community radio FM licence in Greater Manchester (88.4 FM) and carriage on the London III multiplex, operated by DRG London, on block 11B.

The new sound of Gaydio - a mostly upbeat dance format - was accompanied by a new slogan 'The Beat of Gay UK', and was launched at 7 am on Monday 7 January 2013 with the return of the 'Chris and Emma at Breakfast' show broadcast across its licensed areas and online.

== Expansion ==
Following the expansion in the London market, Gaydio went on to launch in several other cities across the UK as part of the Ofcom small-scale DAB trial and later the permanent small scale DAB services.

In 2018 Gaydio applied for, and won, a community radio licence for Brighton, launching their FM service there in October of that year. The Brighton service was initially based at the former Juice FM studios on North Street, before moving to the Ledward Centre on Jubilee Street.

The station operates a number of audio splits, used for targeted localised advertising and content. It also broadcast bespoke programming, mainly in Brighton and Manchester where they have FM community radio services.

In recent years the station has broadened its appeal, with subtle changes to the music format which has seen pop music increasingly played and a more diverse lineup of presenters. From 2023, Gaydio now uses the slogan 'The UK's LGBTQ+ station'.

In January 2023 the station added carriage on seven further small-scale DAB multiplexes.

In December 2025 Gaydio announced a revised programme schedule taking effect from 5 January 2026, adding new weekday early breakfast, mid-morning, afternoon and evening programmes and changes across the weekend line-up.

== Twentieth anniversary and studio move ==
In April 2026, marking twenty years since its first broadcast, Gaydio opened new premises in Manchester overlooking the city's Gay Village. The building contains three visualised studios and a dedicated hub for the Gaydio Academy. The station described the relocation as the largest single investment in its history, funded by the Big Issue Investment Fund, Warner Music Group, OVO Energy and the company's own reserves.

=== Other output ===
Since 2024 Gaydio has produced Gaydio in Europe, a travel podcast series made in partnership with British Airways and its BA Euroflyer subsidiary, presenting LGBTQ+ travel guides to European destinations. A further series launched in October 2025.

== Academy ==
Alongside the broadcast service, Gaydio runs The Gaydio Academy, a training and skills development service for LGBTQ+ people. To date, they have offered courses in cities across the UK including Manchester, Birmingham, London, Brighton & Edinburgh and work with over 200 people per year. Since April 2026 the Academy has had a dedicated hub within the station's Manchester premises, offering training, mentoring and practical experience to emerging LGBTQ+ broadcasters and creatives.

== Gaydio Awards ==
In 2023, Gaydio hosted their inaugural awards ceremony, the Gaydio Awards, at the Hilton Hotel, Manchester, headlined by artists including Raye and Sigala. The annual event celebrates LGBTQ+ life across the UK and awards contributions from individuals, organisations and corporations. The event has been held annually since, recognising contributions to LGBTQ+ life across the United Kingdom by individuals, organisations and businesses. The fourth ceremony took place on 20 March 2026 at the Deansgate Hotel in Manchester, presenting sixteen awards and carried across Gaydio's radio and social platforms.

== Awards and nominations ==
Year	Association	Category	Nominee(s)	Result
2017	Diversity in Media Awards	Radio Programme / Station of the Year	Gaydio	Nominated
2025	Campaign Audio Advertising Awards	Best Branded Series (B2C)	Gaydio in Europe with British Airways	Won
2026	Campaign Audio Advertising Awards	Branded Series Prize	Gaydio in Europe with British Airways	Won
2026	National Diversity Awards	Community Organisation (LGBT)	Gaydio	Nominated
