= Hornet (app) =

Social networking and dating app

- Initial release: 2011; 15 years ago
- Operating system: Android, iOS, web
- Website: hornet.com

Hornet is a location-based social networking and online dating application for gay, bisexual, and non-heterosexual men, as well as other men who have sex with men (MSM). In 2018, it was seen as "Grindr's chief competitor in the gay app market". As well as featuring other men, the app contains city guide books and LGBT-specific news.

The app is intended to be used in countries where coming out as LGBT is problematic (see LGBT rights by country or territory), but can be used in most countries in the world. Many users of Hornet also use another similar MSM apps, with Grindr, Scruff and Jack'd being the most popular in the United States.
