= Gaydar (website) =

Gay dating website and app

- Website type: Online dating service
- Available in: English, French, German, Dutch, Spanish, Portuguese, Italian, Japanese
- Owner: CPC Connect Ltd
- Creators: Gary Frisch and Henry Badenhorst
- Website: www.gaydar.net
- Commercial: Yes
- Registration: Required
- Launched: November 1999; 26 years ago

Gaydar is a profile-based dating website for gay and bisexual men. It was created in 1999 as a tool to connect gay and bisexual men all over the world for friendships, hook-ups, dating and relationships.

== History ==
Gaydar was founded in 1999 in Cape Town, South Africa, by the London-based South African couple Gary Frisch and Henry Badenhorst. They were inspired to create the platform after a friend complained that he was too busy to look for a new boyfriend.

The initial idea was based upon a corporate intranet with the codename "RADAR" (Rapid Access And Deployment Resource), which at the time was being developed by programmers Ian Van Schalkwyk and Stephen Hadden for a prominent South African advertising conglomerate. The website was launched in November 1999.

The company also launched the parallel website Gaydar Girls aimed at women (which, as of 2023, had closed down) and Gaydar Radio in around 2001.

In May 2007, Henry Badenhorst was named by the Independent on Sunday Pink List as the fourth most influential gay person in Britain, down from third place the previous year.

In 2009, Gaydar released apps for iOS and Android.

In May 2013, it was announced that the site had been sold to Charlie Parsons, the creator of Channel 4's The Big Breakfast.

In 2017, Gaydar relaunched its site, app and brand.

== Features ==
Users create a personal 'member' profile, which is then used to interact and contact other registered members. Users can also send messages to each other and participate in chat rooms, which — except for the Australian and Irish chat rooms — tend to be dominated by UK users.

=== Access ===
Registered users are able to browse through online lists of users who are logged into the site at that time, or through lists of all active profiles. Users can upgrade to a premium account to access Gaydar VIP, which offers more features and privileges. Members may add more photos into an 'album' attached to their profile that are viewable by other members. Guests face other site restrictions, such as a daily limit of 8 messages that they can send and 25 profiles that they can view, and a limit on number of chat rooms accessible at the same time. Guests cannot view archives of sent messages, and cannot use the friends list and do not have access to all search options. About a third of users are members.

=== Profiles ===
Profiles typically include standard information on age, location, physical features, sexual predilections, hobbies, and pastimes. Profiles usually include a free format description about their owner and what they seek in a partner. There is provision for profile owners to upload a number of photographs, typically of themselves — one as the 'main photo', several as 'secondary photos', and several more as 'private photos' that can be sent as attachments to private messages.

== Controversy and criticisms ==
Critics alleged in 2003 that the site facilitates barebacking (anal intercourse without a condom), though this criticism is potentially true of any dating site.

Media attention was drawn in 2003 when the website was used by Labour Party MP Chris Bryant, and in 2006, when married Liberal Democrat leadership candidate Mark Oaten used it to find gay sexual partners.

== Deaths of co-founders ==
The chairman and co-founder of Gaydar, Gary Frisch died unexpectedly at his home in London on 11 February 2007, aged 38 years. A verdict of misadventure was recorded by Paul Knapman, the coroner at the inquest. A pathologist, Peter Wilkins, said ketamine was found in Frisch's blood and liver. On 11 November 2017, co-founder Henry Badenhorst died unexpectedly at the age of 51. He was reported to have taken his own life.

== See also ==
- Gaydar
- Gaydar Radio
- Homosocialization
- List of LGBT social networking services
- Timeline of online dating services
- Tinder
