= Scruff (app) =

Online dating application

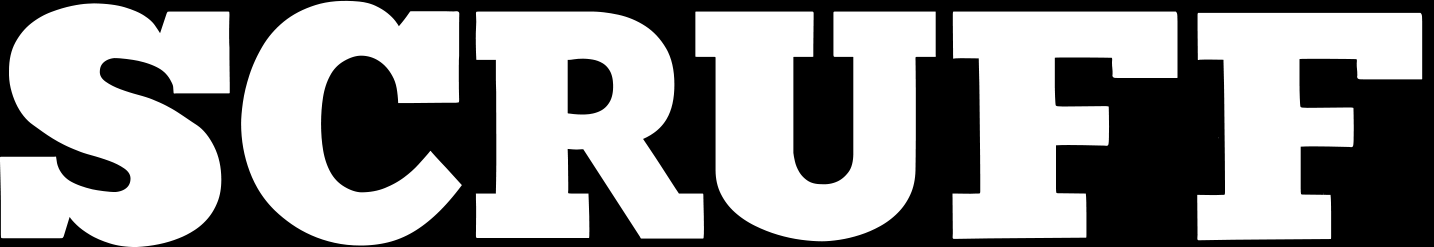

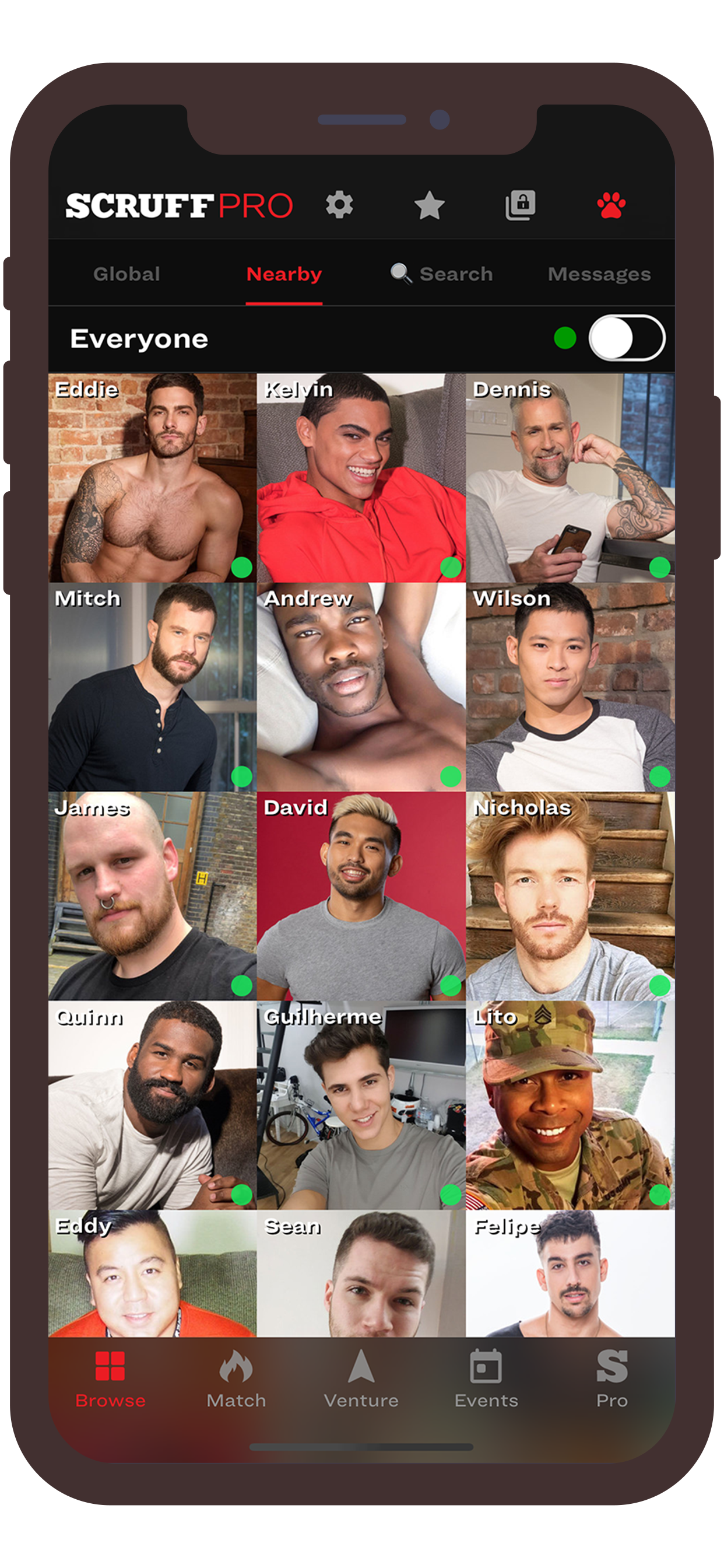
- An example of Scruff Venture
- Developers: Perry Street Software, Inc (company)
- Release: July 23, 2010
- Operating system: iOS, Android, Windows Phone
- Type: Dating app
- Website: scruff.com

Scruff (stylised as SCRUFF) is an American-French international social application for men seeking men that runs on iOS and Android devices. The app allows users to upload profiles and photos, and search for other members by location and shared interests. Users can directly message other users or they can use the app's "Woof" feature, which allows users to express interest in another user's profile.

As of 2019, the app has approximately 15+ million members worldwide with Scruff downloads taking place throughout 180 countries and six continents. The app has been translated into 10 languages including Spanish, Portuguese, German, Italian, French, Chinese, and Arabic.

The app is free to download. Users can opt to purchase a paid membership, Scruff Pro, to access additional features.

== History ==
The company was founded in 2010 by Johnny Skandros and Eric Silverberg, now its CEO.

In 2013, the app added a community for HIV-positive users called "Poz." Scruff was the first app to include options for members of the military and transgender community.

In October, 2015, the company launched Scruff Version 5, which included new communities, relationship types, sex preferences, and safety practices.

In 2018, Scruff stopped using third-party programmatic ads, such as banner ads, and moved to a revenue model based on subscriptions and direct advertising. Company CEO Eric Silverberg said that the decision was based on concerns about "shady advertising," as well as user safety and privacy, particularly in regions or countries where homophobia is still widespread.

As of August 2018, Scruff does not require members to provide information about race or ethnicity. CEO Eric Silverberg said the decision will help the company "ensure that harassment, racism, and abuse doesn't happen."

In January 2019, after multiple suspensions from Google Play, Scruff announced that it was banning profile photos featuring "sexually suggestive embraces" or members in their underwear or in swimming trunks.

Scruff launched a live-streaming trivia game show called "Hosting" in March 2019. Users compete for cash prizes by answering LGBT-themed pop culture and history questions through the Scruff app. They can also view and send "Woof" notifications to other players.

== Awards and recognition ==
In 2014, the company won several mobile app awards including Time Out New York's Best App Award.

In 2018, Scruff was included in Digital Trends' list of "Best LGBT dating apps for Android and iOS."

In 2018, The Daily Dot named Scruff as one of the "9 best dating sites and apps for gay men."

TechRadar included Scruff on its list of "best dating apps 2019."

== Safety, awareness and security ==
In 2015, the company added a traveler alert feature that notifies users when they reach one of approximately 100 countries where homosexuality is criminalized, sends alerts to members about immediate safety concerns in these regions, and partners with the International Lesbian, Gay, Bisexual, Trans and Intersex Association (ILGA), on a web page identifying anti-gay laws in such countries.

In 2018, chief executive officer Eric Silverberg said that Scruff has no plans to integrate with Facebook due to concerns about privacy and data mining.

In March 2024, Police in Washington state announced a pair of suspects are facing murder charges in connection with the defrauding and murder of Curtis Engeland, 74, after the pair gained his trust through Scruff.

== Operations ==
Using geolocation, the home interface displays a grid of user profile pictures, arranged from nearest to farthest away. Tapping a picture opens a users' profile displaying options to chat, send a "Woof," save profiles, and unlock private photos, videos, and other information from the user.

=== Features ===
- The travel-focused "Venture" service allows users to browse popular travel destinations around the world, meet up with other users, RSVP to local events, and search for accommodations. Venture also includes a chat function that connects users to local "ambassadors" who can provide suggestions about where to go and what to do in more than 500 destinations.
- The "Woof" option enables members to express interest by "woofing" at another member as an alternate choice to directly messaging them.
- The "Stealth Mode" feature uses GPS obfuscation to hide a user's location if a member chooses that option for their privacy or protection.
- Match: This feature allows users to use a photo swipe for members specifically seeking relationships.
- Insights: Allows users to see statistics based on a certain users' responsiveness towards other communities within the app.

== In popular culture ==
The company unveiled an ad campaign on a billboard just outside Super Bowl XLIX that read "Play on Our Team" to encourage acceptance of gay professional athletes. Founder Johnny Skandros and Scruff's Pit Crew were featured as guests on Season 6 of RuPaul's Drag Race.

Scruff supported the Delhi International Queer Theater and Film Festival in 2016. In October 2018, YouTube personality and model Brendan Jordan partnered with Scruff to promote National Coming Out Day. Teenage character Jules Vaughn uses the app in HBO television series Euphoria.

== See also ==
- Homosocialization
- Comparison of online dating services
- Timeline of online dating services
