= Manhunt (social network) =

Online dating service for gay men

- Homepage of Manhunt.net
- Website type: Geosocial networking; Online dating service; Online dating application
- Available in: English, Spanish, French, Portuguese, German, Italian, Chinese, and Japanese
- Owners: Online Buddies, Inc.
- Creators: Jonathan Crutchley; Larry Basile
- Website: manhunt.net
- Registration: Required
- Launched: April 1, 2001; 25 years ago
- Current status: Online

Manhunt is a geosocial networking website and online dating application that facilitates male same-sex introductions. The majority of profiles are sexually explicit and include nude photographs and graphic language and are by patrons that are looking to hook up. Some profiles, however, are specifically not designated as primarily sexually oriented and explicitly state they are not cruising for sex.

== History ==
Manhunt was officially launched in Cambridge, Massachusetts on April 1, 2001, by Jonathan Crutchley and Larry Basile after their original Boston-based gay telephone dating service declined when more of their clients began to use the Web to find partners. Within a year, about 10,000 men from the greater Boston area had created profiles on the site.

Initially a free service, Manhunt emailed its customers in April 2002 and told them that those who wanted to enjoy all the perks of the site would have to pay $10 per month, and those who declined to pay would be able to use a more bare-bones version of the site. About 2,000 customers immediately signed up for the paid membership.

In December 2006, an independent tracking agency ranked Manhunt as the largest LGBT-targeted site online, surpassing long-time leader Gay.com.

In April 2008, Crutchley revealed to Bay Windows that Manhunt has more subscribers outside the U.S. than in the U.S.

In mid-2008, Manhunt made video chat available to members after popular request.

In August 2008, Manhunt launched OnTheHUNT, a companion video-hosting site dedicated to filming actual Manhunt members having sex. To distinguish itself from competitors, OnTheHUNT boasted unlimited video lengths and used its own members as models instead of gay-for-pay actors.

In early 2009, Manhunt released its first major upgrade in 7 years. The upgrade modernized the site's look and feel and included many sought-after features, like the addition of penis size and sex position preferences to members' profiles.

On November 13, 2013, Manhunt announced—via its corporate moniker Online Buddies, Inc.—the acquisition of Jack'd, one of the leading location-based gay dating apps. Jack'd had over 2 million active accounts and about 1 million daily unique users when the acquisition deal was signed. Manhunt plans to keep Jack'd a separate product from Manhunt.

== Public health ==
Manhunt partners with hundreds of community health organizations worldwide under its "Manhunt Cares" initiative. Using approved health profiles, community health partners run ads alongside members' personal postings. Many of these are partner notification profiles that serve as anonymous intermediaries that allow members to inform each other when they may have come in contact with an STD. In August 2006, a community health advocate at the AIDS Action Committee of Massachusetts told the Boston Herald, "In comparison to lots of other sites, [Manhunt]'s light-years ahead."

Nevertheless, Manhunt provides a chat room titled "Bareback" for its members interested in condomless sex. It also features advertising from porn websites that promote bareback sex, and it promotes bareback porn via its Manhunt Blog. In May 2005, Manhunt's general manager told New York Magazine:

It all boils down to personal choice. We believe that people have the right to PNP or not to PNP, to use condoms or not use condoms. What we hope is that people will back up their choices with responsible behavior. We provided an empty site and our customers have filled it. But the majority of them don't PNP or bareback.

== Controversies ==
In December 2005, a school board chairman in Richmond, Virginia resigned after his "explicit" Manhunt profile was discovered by a reporter for the Richmond Times-Dispatch. At a public school board meeting, the chairman told the crowd he "displayed an inappropriate lack of judgment".

In November 2005 and April 2006, police in Washington, D.C. made two arrests for theft crimes related to victims they had met on Manhunt.

In August 2008, Manhunt's co-founder Jonathan Crutchley resigned from the company's board after it was revealed that he made a $2,300 contribution to John McCain's presidential campaign in March 2008. In February 2009, Crutchley was appointed Chairman of Manhunt's Philanthropy Committee.

In April 2021, Manhunt filed a notice with the Washington attorney general's office as a result of a database breach that exposed user account credentials. The breach was said to have contained the usernames, email addresses, and passwords of 11% of the site's users.

== See also ==
- Homosocialization
- Timeline of online dating services
- Tinder
