= Homosocialization =

Process by which an LGBT person meets and relates to others of the same community

Homosocialization or LGBT socialization is the process by which LGBTQ people meet, relate and become integrated in the LGBT community, especially with people of the same sexual orientation and gender identity, helping to build their own identity as well.

== Institutions ==
=== High schools ===
Gay–straight alliances (GSAs) started to appear in schools the 1980s. They were a way for the youth of the community to overcome seclusion and stigma in the school environment. Currently registered under the parent network GLSEN, there are over 3,000 clubs in the United States.

The social climate of a school has a direct relationship to the health of the students, both physically and mentally. A 2021 survey of students revealed that 68% of people heard negative remarks; 68% felt unsafe; 32% had missed at least one day of school in the past month, markers nearly unchanged from a similar study in 2003.

=== Universities ===
Higher education organizations that house LGBT/queer people can strengthen their systems for encouraging socialization through appropriate research within the student body. Not carrying out such research damages the life of students because an institution is unable to make sure it is keeping up-to-date on relevant issues. With continued research institutes can contribute to the bettering of life and success of their LGBT students.

The last three decades have seen an increase in LGBT centers on college campuses. These centers are used to help students develop their identities on and off campus, with their intention being to promote and work towards building a more accepting and informed campus environment. The centers also frequently employ professionals who work to improve the campus life experience.

== Spaces ==
Spaces of homosocialization are those physical or virtual places frequented by LGBT people to meet other people of the LGBT community or to find partners, and where it is possible to express freely their sexual identity.

There are numerous businesses and associations targeting gender and sexual diversity that allow the meeting and socialization of LGBT community. In many cases, they emerge in LGBT villages, where the LGBT community is concentrated. However, many places are suffering from competition among social networks and the internet to attract LGBT people.

=== Historically ===
Before configuring places specifically for the LGBT community, the most regular practice for interaction in the gay community was sexual encounters in certain outdoor places, such as parks or public baths. Although less frequent, cruising is still a common practice, especially among men who have sex with other men.

==== Bath houses ====
In the late 19th century and early 20th century bath houses were seen as places of safety and privacy because homosexuality was criminalized. In the early 1900s these were not official spaces and were subject to police raids, but in 1960s bathhouses started being officially established as gay spaces.

==== Gay/lesbian bars ====
In the 1960s gay bars were recognized as spaces to connect with other LGBT+ people, finding friends and also partners.

=== Digital ===
==== Social media ====
With today's widespread access to the internet, many people use it to connect with others, be exposed to a broader public, and express themselves. For youths, social media has become a place where they can learn about the arts, politics, sex education, and sexuality through a common online community.

== See also ==
- Cass identity model
- Cruising for sex
- Fassinger's model of gay and lesbian identity development
- Handkerchief code
- Pink capitalism
- Pinkwashing
- Queer Nation
- Sexuality and space
- Stonewall Nation
