= Timeline of LGBTQ history in Canada =

Canadian pride flag

This is a timeline of notable events in the history of the lesbian, gay, bisexual, transgender, and Queer (LGBT) community in Canada. For a broad overview of LGBTQ history in Canada see LGBTQ history in Canada.

== 1600s ==
- 1648: A gay military drummer stationed at the French garrison in Ville-Marie, New France is sentenced to death for sodomy by the local Sulpician priests. After an intervention by the Jesuits in Quebec City, the drummer's life is spared on the condition that he accept the position of New France's first permanent executioner. As only the drummer was placed on trial, the widespread consensus of many historians is that his sexual partner may have been a First Nations man who was not subject to French religious law. In his 2006 book Répression des homosexuels au Québec et en France, historian Patrice Corriveau identifies the drummer as "René Huguet dit Tambour", although other historians have challenged this identification as no known historical records place a person of that name in New France any earlier than 1680.
- 1691: Military officer Nicolas Daussy de Saint-Michel and two commoners, Jean Forgeron dit La Rose and Jean Filliau dit Dubois, are arrested on charges of sodomy. Saint-Michel, highly knowledgeable about the law, refuses to cooperate with the investigation, successfully arguing that under France's Grande ordonnance criminelle of 1670 a charge of sodomy could only be investigated by the Sovereign Council of New France rather than the local bailiwick; the case is transferred to Quebec City, where the council ultimately finds all three guilty. Dubois and La Rose are sentenced to additional time in the military, while Saint-Michel is fined 200 livres and exiled back to France.

== 1800s ==
- 1810: Alexander Wood, a merchant and magistrate in York (which will become Toronto in 1834), is embroiled in a sex scandal when he investigates a rape case by personally inspecting the penises of the suspected assailants for a scratch left by the woman who filed the rape charge.
- 1832: Private Flowers, an infantryman, is sentenced to death for having sex with another man. His case remains virtually unknown until the premiere Private Flowers in 2023 created by mixed-media artist HAUI featuring Rodney Diverlus and Jera Wolfe.
- 1838: George Herchmer Markland, a member of the Legislative Council of Upper Canada, is forced to resign his seat after facing allegations of making sexual advances towards other men.
- 1842: Patrick Kelly and Samuel Moore, the first two men in Canada historically recorded as having been criminally convicted of sodomy for what the court records clearly describe as consensual sexual activity, arrive at Kingston Penitentiary. Both men were sentenced to death, although their sentences are commuted on August 22; Moore is released from prison in 1849 and Kelly is released in 1853.
- 1869: Buggery is no longer punishable by death in Canada, replaced instead by a maximum punishment of life in prison.

== 1900–1950s ==
=== 1918 ===
- Montreal writers Elsa Gidlow and Roswell George Mills launch Les Mouches fantastiques, a mimeographed underground magazine which is the first known LGBT publication in Canadian and North American history. At least five issues are published before Mills and Gidlow move to New York City in the early 1920s.

=== 1943 ===
- In the Montreal literary magazine First Statement, John Sutherland publishes a review of the poetry of Patrick Anderson, intuiting homoerotic themes and accusing Anderson of "some sexual experience of a kind not normal". Although Anderson would in fact come out as gay later in life, he was married to a woman at the time; he threatened to sue, and First Statement printed a retraction in its following issue.

=== 1949 ===
- Jim Egan, a Toronto native who would later become a co-plaintiff in the landmark legal case Egan v. Canada, begins writing letters to newspapers and magazines protesting depictions of homosexuality and calling for reform of laws regarding homosexual Canadians. He writes his letters until 1964, when he and his partner move to British Columbia.

== 1960s ==
The RCMP, throughout the late 1950s and the entirety of the 1960s, kept tabs on homosexuals and the patrons of gay bars in Ottawa and other cities. The force also worked with the FBI's own surveillance of homosexuals and alerted the FBI when a suspected homosexual had crossed the border to the United States.

=== 1962 ===
- Jackie Shane, a rhythm and blues singer from Toronto, has a chart hit with "Any Other Way". The song's lyrics include an explicit and deliberate play on the dual meaning of the word "gay". Shane, who performed in female clothing despite being male-identified at the time, would later come out as transgender, although this was not confirmed on the record by a media outlet until 2017.

=== 1963 ===
- The RCMP Directorate of Security and Intelligence's A-3 Unit (a unit dedicated to rooting out and removing all homosexuals from government and law enforcement, itself a subsection of the A Unit dedicated to finding out character flaws in government employees in the aftermath of the Second Red Scare) produced a map of Ottawa replete with red dots marking all alleged residences and frequent visitations of homosexuals. However, the map was soon filled with red ink and was disposed, and after two larger maps of the city being used to a similar purpose and outcome, the mapping soon ended.

=== 1964 ===
- Canada sees its first gay-positive organization, ASK, and first gay magazines: ASK Newsletter (in Vancouver), and Gay (by Gay Publishing Company of Toronto). Gay was the first periodical to use the term 'Gay' in the title and expanded quickly, including outstripping the distribution of American publications under the name Gay International. These were quickly followed by Two (by Gayboy (later Kamp) Publishing Company of Toronto).
- Journalist Sidney Katz publishes "The Homosexual Next Door", one of the first articles in a mainstream Canadian publication ever to portray homosexuality in a relatively positive light, in Maclean's.

=== 1965 ===
- Winter Kept Us Warm, a gay-themed independent film by David Secter, becomes the first English Canadian film to be given a screening at the Cannes Film Festival.
- Poet Edward A. Lacey publishes The Forms of Life, credited as the first volume of openly gay-identified poetry in Canadian literature.
- George Klippert, the last person in Canada ever to be imprisoned for homosexuality before its legalization in 1969, is arrested and charged with four counts of "gross indecency" after admitting to a police investigator that he had consensual sex with men.

=== 1967 ===
- Writer Scott Symons publishes Place d'Armes, one of the first notable gay novels in Canadian literary history.
- John Herbert's play Fortune and Men's Eyes, an important landmark in the history of both LGBT literature and general Canadian theatre, premieres at the Actors Playhouse in New York City.
- December 21: Justice Minister Pierre Trudeau introduces the Criminal Law Amendment Act, 1968-69, an omnibus bill reforming the Criminal Code, which liberalizes Canadian law around social issues such as homosexuality, abortion and contraception. Trudeau's characterization was captured in the statement that there was "no place for the state in the bedrooms of the nation."

=== 1969 ===
- May 14: Canada decriminalizes homosexual acts between consenting adults with the passage of the Criminal Law Amendment Act first introduced in December 1968. It receives royal assent on June 27.
- October 24: The first meeting of the University of Toronto Homophile Association is held.

== 1970s ==
=== 1970 ===
- Poet Ian Young launches Catalyst Press.
- Several of Canada's most noted early gay liberation groups — including the Community Homophile Association of Toronto, the Front de libération homosexuel in Montreal, the Gay Alliance Toward Equality and the Vancouver Gay Liberation Front (GLF), in Vancouver and Gays of Ottawa — are launched.
- April: Dianna Boileau undergoes sex reassignment surgery at Toronto General Hospital, and is reported to be the first transsexual woman in Canada. Later accounts have cast doubt on this claim, though she was at least the first trans woman to have her story told publicly and the first to have transition-related surgery covered by the Ontario Health Insurance Plan.
- April 29: Claude Charron and Guy Joron, two of Canada's earliest known LGBT officeholders, are elected to the National Assembly of Quebec in the 1970 Quebec general election. Neither man was out to the general public during his time in politics, although both were out among their caucus colleagues in the Parti Québécois. Both went on to serve as cabinet ministers when the Parti Quebecois formed government in 1976.
- November 11: Richard Hatfield is sworn in as Premier of New Brunswick. Although it was already something of an "open secret" that Hatfield was gay, he never officially came out as such, and only after his death in 1991 did biographers and journalists start discussing his sexuality on the record.

=== 1971 ===
- August 28: We Demand Rally, Canada's first gay public protest, occurs in Ottawa on Parliament Hill.
- November 1: The Body Politic begins publishing.

=== 1972 ===
- A group led by activist Gens Hellquist incorporates the Zodiac Friendship Society, the first major LGB group in Saskatoon, Saskatchewan. Regina, Winnipeg, and Edmonton also see the formation of their first LGB organizations, local chapters of the national Gay Alliance Toward Equality.
- February: Peter Maloney, an unsuccessful candidate in the 1971 Ontario provincial election and later a prominent businessman in Toronto's Church and Wellesley gay village, officially comes out as gay at a Liberal Party of Canada policy conference. Later in the year, he becomes Canada's first known openly gay political candidate, when he runs for a seat on the Toronto Board of Education.
- June 29: A demonstration is held at Queen's Park to protest the omission of sexual orientation from a package of proposed reforms to the Ontario Human Rights Code.
- September 11: Maclean-Hunter's cable community channel in Toronto airs the first episode of Coming Out, Canada's first television series about LGBT issues.
- December: Cameron Frye, one of Canada's earliest politicians to come out as gay (see December 1980), is elected to the municipal council of Tecumseh, Ontario.

=== 1973 ===
- A collective in Montreal establishes Librairie L'Androgyne, the city's first LGBT-oriented bookstore and of only four ever established in Canada.
- May 10: The first Canadian play about and starring a drag queen, Hosanna by Michel Tremblay, is performed at Théâtre de Quat'Sous in Montreal.
- August: The Canadian Gay Liberation Movement Archives are launched.
- August 17–26: Pride Week 1973, a national LGBT rights event, takes place simultaneously in several Canadian cities.
- October 6: The first national conference of LGBT organizations is hosted in Quebec City by the Centre humanitaire d'aide et de libération.
- October 10: Following a lobbying campaign by the Gay Alliance Toward Equality, Toronto City Council adopts a policy forbidding discrimination on the basis of sexual orientation in municipal hiring, making the city the first jurisdiction in Canada to do so.

=== 1974 ===
- Both Newfoundland and Labrador (Community Homophile Association of Newfoundland) and New Brunswick (Gay Friends of Fredericton) see the formation of the first gay groups in their respective provinces.
- January 5: The Brunswick Four are arrested at the Brunswick Tavern in Toronto. They are defended pro bono by former federal cabinet minister Judy LaMarsh.
- January 15: Rev. Bob Wolfe of the Metropolitan Community Church of Toronto successfully talks a distraught young gay man out of committing suicide by jumping off the roof of Toronto City Hall's east tower. He is presented an award by Toronto City Council for his bravery on February 6, and uses his acceptance speech to criticize the Toronto Star for refusing to print an advertisement for the church; the Star prints the ad the following day.
- February 11: In Canada's first known same-sex marriage ceremony, Winnipeg residents Richard North and Chris Vogel are married by a Unitarian minister. They will eventually become the lead plaintiffs in Vogel v. Canada, the case which leads to the legalization of Same-sex marriage in Manitoba in 2004 — however, as in 2021 Vogel and North lost their fight at the Manitoba Court of Queen's Bench on June 1, 2021. Their original 1974 marriage certificate is now on display at the Canadian Museum of Human Rights.
- February 14: University of Toronto sociologist John Alan Lee comes out as gay on TVOntario's The Judy LaMarsh Show, becoming one of Canada's first prominent professionals ever to do so.
- November: The Vancouver chapter of the Gay Alliance Toward Equality files a complaint with the British Columbia Human Rights Commission against the Vancouver Sun, after the newspaper refuses to print an advertisement for Gay Tide. This will eventually become the first gay rights case to reach the Supreme Court of Canada.

=== 1975 ===
- The collective responsible for publication of The Body Politic formally incorporates as Pink Triangle Press.
- February 6 - The Ontario Racing Commission fires John Damien, a racing steward at Woodbine Racetrack, for being gay. One of the landmark early LGBTQ rights cases in Canada, his wrongful dismissal lawsuits against both the commission and the doctor who outed him to his bosses face numerous legal hurdles over the years, but ultimately lead to the addition of sexual orientation to the Ontario Human Rights Code in 1986.
- Maurice Richard, one of Canada's first-ever out gay male politicians, is elected mayor of Bécancour, Quebec. Contemporary biographical sources indicate that he came out as gay sometime during his term as mayor, but are not clear about what year this occurred in.
- March 4: The "Ottawa Sex Scandal" begins when eighteen gay men, the owner and several customers of a modelling agency and dating service, are arrested and charged with sexual offences. Their names are released by police and published by the press; at least one of the men, Warren Zufelt, commits suicide on March 18 because of his outing.
- April: The Aquarius bathhouse in Montreal is firebombed. The perpetrators are never found or arrested. Three customers die in the resulting fire; two of them are buried in anonymous graves because their bodies are never identified or claimed by their families.
- June: Gay Information and Resources Calgary (GIRC) was founded
- July 7: A Gay Caucus is formed at the national convention of the New Democratic Party, marking the first LGBT-oriented committee within a mainstream political party in Canada.
- September 22: University of Saskatchewan graduate student Douglas Wilson is barred from working as a teaching assistant because of his participation in the gay liberation movement.

=== 1976 ===
- Police crackdowns against gay bars in Montreal's Stanley Street gay village, widely perceived as mayor Jean Drapeau's attempts to "clean up" the city in advance of the 1976 Summer Olympics, lead to riots.
- April 5: Ottawa City Council passes a motion prohibiting discrimination on the basis of sexual orientation in municipal hiring, becoming only the second jurisdiction in Canada to do so.
- May 6: Ontario MPPs Margaret Campbell and Ted Bounsall introduce private members' bills to include sexual orientation in the Ontario Human Rights Code, although both motions fail.
- July: After two gay men are arrested for kissing in public at the corner of Yonge and Bloor Streets in Toronto, several gay activists stage a kiss-in protest at the same corner.
- October: The Lesbian Organization of Toronto is formed.
- December: The openly gay Ian Maclennan is a candidate for election to the Ottawa Board of Education in the 1976 municipal election.

=== 1977 ===
- The Canadian film Outrageous!, starring drag queen Craig Russell, becomes one of the first gay-themed films ever to break out into mainstream theatrical release.
- March 14: Windsor, Ontario becomes the third city in Canada to pass a motion banning discrimination against city employees on the basis of sexual orientation.
- May 9: Barbara Thornborrow becomes the first member of the Canadian Forces to challenge a discharge from the military on the grounds of her sexuality.
- June 2: Out of the Closets, an LGB-oriented television program, airs on the Skyline Cable and Ottawa Cable community channels in Ottawa. The series is produced by Gays of Ottawa, who subsequently also launch a French language edition on the cable company in Hull.
- June 9: Two openly gay candidates, Therese Faubert of the League for Socialist Action in Brampton and Frank Lowery of the Ontario New Democratic Party in Scarborough North, are on the ballot in the 1977 Ontario provincial election.
- August: Toronto residents learn of the sexual assault and murder of the boy Emanuel Jaques by three men, resulting in media coverage which unfairly paints the entire gay community as pedophiles.
- September 20: The television program Gay News and Views premieres. Produced by Maclean-Hunter's cable community channel, the series airs on all three of Metro Toronto's major cable providers: Maclean-Hunter, Rogers and Metro Cable. After the first episode Rogers backs out of airing the show on the grounds of alleged complaints about its content, although due to pressure from the LGBT community the company reinstates the program three weeks later.
- October: Two gay establishments in Montreal, Mystique and Truxx, are raided. A protest organized the next day attracts 2,000 participants. By December, the province of Quebec becomes the second jurisdiction in the world, behind only Denmark, to pass a law banning discrimination on the basis of sexual orientation.
- November: The Body Politic publishes Gerald Hannon's article "Men Loving Boys Loving Men", resulting in a five-year legal battle over whether the magazine was guilty of publishing "immoral, indecent or scurrilous material".

=== 1978 ===
- Buddies in Bad Times, Canada's oldest surviving theatre company dedicated to LGBT theatre, is launched by Matt Walsh, Fabian Boutilier, Jerry Ciccoritti, and Sky Gilbert.
- May 18: Brent Hawkes is selected as the new pastor of the Metropolitan Community Church of Toronto, succeeding Bob Wolfe.
- May 26: Maclean-Hunter's community channel cancels Gay News and Views.
- June: Gay activist Dean Haynes announces his candidacy for Toronto City Council in the 1978 municipal election. He later withdraws his registration due to lack of support.
- August 9: CKMS-FM, a radio station in the Kitchener-Waterloo region of Ontario, launches Gay News and Views, Canada's first known LGBT-oriented radio program.
- November 13: Jim Monk, an openly gay candidate for election to the Windsor Board of Education, loses the election.

=== 1979 ===
- May 10: In the British Columbia provincial election, Robert Douglas Cook garners 126 votes in West Vancouver-Howe Sound as a candidate of the Gay Alliance Toward Equality.
- August 20: Several gay activists stage a sit-in protest in the offices of Roy McMurtry, the Attorney General of Ontario, to demand a meeting about police and legal harassment of the gay community.
- Summer: Montreal and Vancouver become the first Canadian cities to host an official Pride march and festival.

== 1980s ==
=== 1980 ===
- Gay activist George Hislop runs for a seat on Toronto City Council in the 1980 municipal election. He finishes third in the race for Ward 6 on November 10.
- October 31: For the first time, a police presence protects gay spectators and drag queens from anti-gay harassment at the annual Hallowe'en show at Toronto's St. Charles Tavern.
- December: At the last caretaker meeting of Tecumseh, Ontario's municipal council following the 1980 municipal elections, outgoing reeve and unsuccessful mayoral candidate Cameron Frye acknowledges that he is gay. The campaign had been marked by rumours about Frye's sexuality, including the distribution of hate literature claiming that Frye would promote a "gay lifestyle" as mayor and would lead the town into "moral decay", although Frye refused to address the rumours about his sexuality during the campaign.

=== 1981 ===
- February 5: Four gay bathhouses in Toronto are raided by the Toronto Police Service in Operation Soap. The event is now considered one of the crucial turning points in Canadian LGBT history, as an unprecedented community mobilization — now regarded as the Canadian equivalent of the 1969 Stonewall riots — took place to protest police conduct. One of the protest marches during this mobilization is now generally recognized as the first Toronto Pride event.
- February 11: As part of the continuing series of protests against Operation Soap, gay activist George Hislop announces that he will run as an independent protest candidate in the riding of St. George in the 1981 provincial election.
- February 22: The Running Man, starring Chuck Shamata as a man struggling to come to terms with being gay, airs on the CBC Television anthology series For the Record as the first known LGBT-themed television film produced in Canada.
- May 30: Pisces Health Spa in Edmonton, Alberta, is raided by the City of Edmonton Police after a lengthy undercover investigation by the then called Morality Control Unit. Many of the 56 men police arrested eventually pleaded guilty, despite the fact that there was no evidence to suggest prostitutes were working in the spa, nor that minors were enticed to enter. Undercover police officers had acted as patrons of the Pisces Health Spa. One of the arrested men was Michael Phair, later to become the city's first openly gay city councillor.
- Jim Egan is elected to the Comox-Strathcona Regional District board.

=== 1982 ===
- Demographic and economic changes begin to shift Montreal's gay village from rue Stanley to rue Sainte-Catherine.
- July 1 - Track Two (Enough Is Enough), a documentary film about the Operation Soap protests of the previous year, premieres at the Bloor Cinema.

=== 1983 ===
- April 20: The Back Door Gym, one of the establishments raided in 1981, is raided again. This raid is protested on April 23. No further bathhouse raids take place in the 1980s. The warrant used in this raid was declared invalid by the courts on October 3, 1984.
- July 23: A firebombing attack on Henry Morgentaler's abortion clinic in Toronto also results in significant damage to the Toronto Women's Bookstore, one of Canada's most important venues for feminist and lesbian literature.

=== 1984 ===
- March: Pink Triangle Press, the publisher of The Body Politic, launches the local LGBT newspaper Xtra! in Toronto.
- Pink Triangle Services, the first GLBTTQ-specific charity, is incorporated in Ottawa.

=== 1985 ===
- June: Kenneth Zeller is murdered in Toronto's High Park, a hate crime which spurs the Toronto District School Board, Zeller's employer, to implement one of Canada's first programs to combat anti-gay discrimination and violence.
- In the 1985 provincial election in Quebec, openly gay politician Maurice Richard is elected to the National Assembly of Quebec to represent the electoral district of Nicolet, becoming the first openly LGBT Canadian elected to a provincial legislature.

=== 1986 ===
- Activist Jim Egan reaches retirement age. He applies to the Canada Pension Plan for spousal benefits for his partner Jack Nesbit; when the benefits are denied, the court case Egan v. Canada is initiated.
- November 9: Raymond Blain is elected to Montreal City Council in the 1986 municipal election. He is often mistakenly credited as the first openly gay politician ever elected to office in Canada, as a couple of earlier openly gay candidates (e.g. Maurice Richard in 1985) were not widely reported by national media at the time of their elections.
- December: A bill by Ontario MPP Evelyn Gigantes, adding sexual orientation to the Ontario Human Rights Code, is passed in the Legislative Assembly of Ontario.

=== 1987 ===
- February: Pink Triangle Press ceases publication of The Body Politic.
- August 2: Winnipeg holds its first-ever Pride, with a turn-out of 250 LGBT community members, supporters, and allies. The inaugural Pride Winnipeg was one of the first Pride celebrations in Western Canada, following Vancouver in 1979 and Edmonton in 1980. Some the first participants of this event actually wore paper bags over their heads out of fear of rallying in public. The event has since grown to a vibrant, annual festival with an attendance of 35,000.

=== 1988 ===
- February 29: Svend Robinson, MP for Burnaby, British Columbia first elected in 1979, becomes Canada's first elected Member of Parliament to come out as gay.
- CODCO, a sketch comedy series whose cast includes the openly gay Greg Malone and Tommy Sexton, debuts on CBC Television. Along with the later The Kids in the Hall, the show plays a prominent role in the representation of LGBT characters and issues on Canadian television; in addition to the gay characters "Jerome and Duncan", Sexton and Malone were especially renowned for drag-based impersonations of celebrity women such as Queen Elizabeth, Barbara Frum, Barbara Walters, Tammy Faye Bakker and Margaret Thatcher. In one famous sketch, Malone as Frum moderated a debate between Andy Jones as a gay teacher who had been fired from his job for testing HIV-positive and Sexton as Clarabelle Otterhead, the president of an anti-gay lobby group called Citizens Outraged by Weird Sex (or COWS).
- The Kids in the Hall, a sketch comedy series whose cast includes the openly gay Scott Thompson, debuts on CBC Television. Sketches such as Thompson's character Buddy Cole and the ensemble sketch "The Steps" were among the most visible representations of gay culture on Canadian television during the show's run.
- Actor and HIV/AIDS activist Jim St. James begins appearing in a nationally televised series of public service announcements on HIV/AIDS awareness, and is the subject of Jim: A Life with AIDS, a biography by June Callwood.
- Gender mosaic group formed, in Ottawa, in May. A transgender group, one of the first in Canada (possibly the first).

=== 1989 ===
- March 19: Joe Rose, a young gay activist in Montreal, is stabbed to death by a gang of teenagers who targeted him for having pink hair. The incident later inspires educator Michael Whatling, who had been a classmate of Rose's at the time of his death, to publish A Vigil for Joe Rose, an exploration of the struggles faced by LGBT students.
- August 21: Alain Brosseau, a straight man in Ottawa, is attacked by a gang of teenagers who wrongly assumed he was gay, while walking home from his job at the Château Laurier. The attackers chase him through Major's Hill Park to the Alexandra Bridge, and then throw him off the bridge resulting in his death. This results in an LGBT community outcry and eventually leads to the formation of the Ottawa Police Service's LGBT Liaison Committee two years later.
- September 25: The Quebec provincial election expands the National Assembly's gay contingent from one to three. Maurice Richard was joined by fellow Parti Québécois MNAs André Boisclair and André Boulerice. Both would go on to serve in cabinet later. (See also January 29, 1996 for Boisclair's elevation to cabinet and November 15, 2005 for election as party leader.)
- October 25: Glen Murray, a human right and AIDS treatment advocate, is elected Winnipeg city councillor for Fort Rouge, becoming the first openly gay member of Winnipeg City Council. (See also October 28, 1998 for election as mayor, and February 4, 2010 for election to the Ontario provincial legislature.)

== 1990s ==
=== 1990 ===
- July: Montreal's Sex Garage after-hours party is raided, politicizing an entire generation of queer activists
- August 4 - August 11: Vancouver hosts the 1990 Gay Games.
- August: The term two-spirit is officially established at the third annual Native American/First Nations Gay and Lesbian Conference in Winnipeg, Manitoba.
- Chris Lea wins the leadership of the Green Party of Canada, becoming the first openly gay leader of a political party in Canada.

=== 1991 ===
- Following the Alain Brosseau incident of 1989, the Ottawa Police Service forms Canada's first LGBT Police Liaison Committee, with members of both the city's LGBT community and the Ottawa Police force, sitting on it, as well as Canada's first police unit specifically dedicated to the investigation and prosecution of hate crimes.
- March 24 - Gay comedian Michael Boncoeur is found dead in his apartment, having been stabbed by two youth as part of a robbery.
- Hamilton, Ontario mayor Bob Morrow is criticized for refusing to issue an LGBTQ Pride proclamation in the city. Morrow cites a lack of consensus among Hamilton City Council rather than any personal animus against LGBT people, although councillor Dominic Agostino tries to broker a compromise under which Morrow would write a welcome letter instead of a formal civic proclamation.
- October 25 - Diana, Princess of Wales visits Toronto's Casey House hospice for HIV/AIDS patients. The event, during which Diana was photographed physically touching AIDS patients without fear, would later be hailed as an important milestone in shifting public perception of the disease, and inspired Nick Green's 2023 stage play Casey and Diana.
- November 12 - Kyle Rae is elected Toronto City Councillor for Ward 6 Downtown East, becoming the first openly gay member of Toronto City Council in the 1991 Toronto municipal election.

=== 1992 ===
- The Brick Brewing Company of Waterloo introduces Pride Lager, Canada's first beer marketed specifically to LGBT consumers.
- August 6: Ontario Court of Appeal rules in Haig v. Canada, 1992 CanLII 2787 (ON CA) that sexual orientation is an analogous ground of discrimination under s. 15 of the Charter.
- November 29: Yves Lalonde is murdered in Montreal's Angrignon Park by a gang of four neo-Nazi skinheads.

=== 1993 ===
- Pink Triangle Press launches Capital Xtra! in Ottawa and Xtra! West in Vancouver.
- In reaction to the Sex Garage raid of 1990, Divers/Cité is launched as Montreal's annual pride festival.
- Following the death of Michael Boncoeur in 1991, his longtime close friend Lynn Johnston introduces a gay character to her comic strip For Better or For Worse to help combat anti-gay stereotypes and discrimination.
- February 25: A Supreme Court of Canada case, Canada (AG) v Mossop, rules against Brian Mossop's appeal after he is denied employment leave to attend the funeral of his partner Ken Popert's father. Despite the ruling, the case is significant as the first Supreme Court case to explicitly take up a question of LGBT equality rights.
- July 12: Unknown persons toss three Molotov cocktails at the front door of the St. Marc Spa in Toronto. Bomb threats are also called in against Woody's, Bar 501 and the offices of Xtra! the following night.
- October 16: CBC Radio's The Inside Track, a documentary series about social and cultural issues in sport, airs "The Last Closet", a one-hour special on homophobia in sports. The episode is noted for featuring voice-filtered interviews with two anonymous gay Canadian athletes who were not yet prepared to officially come out; they would later be revealed as Mark Leduc and Mark Tewksbury.
- March 1993: In the precedent-setting Ontario Human Rights Commission case Waterman vs. National Life, insurance company National Life is ordered to pay $23,390 in damages to Jan Waterman, a part-time employee who had an offer of full-time employment with the company rescinded after she came out as lesbian.

=== 1994 ===
- January 20: Sherry McKibben was elected to the Edmonton city council in Ward 4 in the 1994 Edmonton municipal by-election and became the first openly lesbian alderman in the city's history. Her election made Edmonton the first Canadian city to have two openly queer aldermen as she served alongside Michael Phair.
- June 9: Bill 167, the Bob Rae government's proposed legislation extending spousal benefits to same-sex couples, is defeated 68–59 in the Legislative Assembly of Ontario, with 12 members of the governing NDP voting against.

=== 1995 ===
- March: The Ontario Human Rights Commission finds that Hamilton, Ontario mayor Bob Morrow's refusal to proclaim Pride Week in 1991 is discriminatory, ordering him to pay $5,000 in damages to the city's Gay and Lesbian Alliance and to issue the proclamation in 1995. Morrow issues a proclamation for 1995, but concurrently announces that he will cease issuing any further civic proclamations for any events at all.
- March 15: Harvey Brownstone was appointed a judge of the Ontario Court of Justice. In media interviews in later years, Justice Brownstone was purported to be the first openly gay judge in Canada.
- April 26: Bloc Quebecois MP Réal Ménard becomes the second out MP in Canada, having casually mentioning that he belongs to the gay community during parliamentary debate.
- July: Dianne Haskett decides not to proclaim Gay Pride, and subsequently is sued by the Homophile Association of London Ontario (HALO). In 1997, she was found guilty of discrimination as a result of the lawsuit.
- unknown date: The Nu West Steam Bath in New Westminster, British Columbia is raided by its new landlords, who enter the premises and cause damage with the express intention of evicting the facility from their property.
- May 25: In the Egan v. Canada decision, the Supreme Court of Canada rules that freedom from discrimination on the basis of sexual orientation is a protected right under the Canadian Charter of Rights and Freedoms. Despite this, the court rules against Jim Egan on the issue of spousal pension benefits that was the core of the case, finding that the restriction of spousal benefits was a justified infringement on the grounds that the core purpose of the benefits was to provide financial support to women who had spent their lives as housewives and mothers without earning their own independent income.

=== 1996 ===
- January 29: André Boisclair, Parti Quebecois MNA for Gouin first elected in 1989 as the province's youngest MNA in history at age 23 (a record held until 2007), is promoted into provincial cabinet of Lucien Bouchard as a Ministre délégué (junior minister), becoming the first openly LGBT Canadian to serve in cabinet. (see also
- The Toronto District School Board launches the Triangle Program, Canada's first alternative high school program for at-risk LGBT youth.
- The Global Television Network-produced game show Love Handles, a Canadian version of The Newlywed Game, faces some controversy for including same-sex couples among its contestants.
- May: During debate on Bill C33, which would formally add sexual orientation to the Canadian Human Rights Act, two Reform Party MPs, David Chatters and Bob Ringma, are suspended from the party caucus after making controversial comments. Ringma is quoted as saying that employers should have the right to move openly gay employees to "the back of the shop" if their presence offends the business's customers, while Chatters asserts that schools should have the right to fire openly gay teachers. A third Reform Party MP, Jan Brown, is also suspended at the same time for publicly criticizing Chatters and Ringma. All three are readmitted to the Reform caucus by September.
- June 20: Bill C33 receives Royal Assent.
- November 27: At the 17th Genie Awards, Lilies becomes the first LGBT-themed film ever to win the Genie Award for Best Motion Picture.

=== 1997 ===
- Controversy emerges when the School District 36 Surrey in Surrey, British Columbia bans three books about same-sex parenting from being used in district schools. The books are Johnny Valentine's One Dad, Two Dads, Brown Dad, Blue Dads, Lesléa Newman's Belinda's Bouquet and Rosamund Elwin and Michele Paulse's Asha's Mums. The matter eventually reaches the Supreme Court of Canada, which rules in the 2002 case Chamberlain v Surrey School District No 36 that the ban is unconstitutional.

=== 1998 ===
- April 2: Vriend v Alberta [1998] 1 S.C.R. 493 is an important Supreme Court of Canada case that determined that a legislative omission can be the subject of a Charter violation. The court ruled that to remedy the situation "sexual orientation" must be read into the impugned provision of the Canadian Charter of Rights and Freedoms.
- September: The first gay-straight alliance in Canada is founded at Pinetree Secondary School in Coquitlam, British Columbia.
- October 12: A naked "mystery man" suffering from dissociative amnesia is found behind a dumpster in Montreal; the only things he reports recalling are that his name is James Brighton and that he is gay. He is eventually confirmed as Matthew Honeycutt, a young heterosexual man from La Follette, Tennessee who was attempting to run away from his fundamentalist Christian family and escape petty crime charges. His story is later dramatized by director Denis Langlois in the 2005 film Amnesia: The James Brighton Enigma.
- October 28: Glen Murray is elected mayor of Winnipeg, becoming Canada's and North America's first openly gay mayor of a city of significant population. (Note: Bunceton, Missouri, with a population of 400, elected openly gay mayor Gene Ulrich in 1980.) With a population of approximately 600,000, Winnipeg becomes the largest city (in population) with an openly LGBT mayor in the world (a claim held until 2001, when Paris, Berlin and Hamburg all elected openly gay mayors.)

=== 1999 ===
- May: The Reform Party of Canada launches an attack on the government of Jean Chrétien because the 1996 film Bubbles Galore had received production funding from various government agencies, including the Canada Council for the Arts, the Ontario Arts Council, Telefilm Canada and the Ontario Film Development Corporation, with party critics demanding to know why the government was funding what it called "lesbian porn".
- June 3: Ontario provincial election returns George Smitherman as the Liberal MPP for Toronto Centre—Rosedale, and Ontario's first openly gay MPP after winning 38.9% of the vote in a hotly contested four-way race with former Toronto mayor John Sewell as an independent candidate. Contesting this same election was openly gay candidate NDP candidate Bonte Minnema, who came in third with 2.8% of the vote in Etobicoke Centre. (see also: October 23, 2003 for Smitherman's elevation to Ontario provincial cabinet)
- April: Ian Nordheimer is appointed by Minister of Justice Anne McLellan to the Superior Court of Ontario, making him the first known openly LGBT federally appointed justice serving in a superior court in Canada.
- The National Archives of Canada release previously sealed personal papers from former Ottawa mayor Charlotte Whitton, 24 years after her death. The released documents include a series of intimate personal letters between Whitton and Margaret Grier, a woman with whom Whitton lived in a Boston marriage until Grier's death. The release of these papers sparked much debate in the Canadian media about whether Whitton and Grier's relationship could be characterized as lesbian, or merely as an emotionally intimate friendship between two unmarried women.

== 2000s ==
=== 2000 ===
- Tim Stevenson is appointed to the Legislative Council of British Columbia, becoming British Columbia's first openly gay provincial minister.
- Little Sisters Book and Art Emporium v. Canada (Minister of Justice), a landmark Supreme Court of Canada case filed by Little Sister's Book and Art Emporium against Canada Customs, begins.
- August 6: NDP Premier of British Columbia Ujjal Dosanjh marches in the Vancouver Pride Parade, the first incumbent first minister in Canada to do so. The next appearances of an incumbent first minister in pride parade will not take place until summer of 2012 when Alberta Premier Allison Redford matches in the Edmonton pride parade.
- September 15: Toronto Police raid Pussy Palace, a Toronto Women's Bathhouse Committee event. No charges were laid against participants, although police recorded the names of 10 women. Two volunteers were charged under the Liquor Licence Act, the event having had a special occasion permit. The charges were later stayed on constitutional grounds; the charter rights of participants were deemed to have been violated. In a subsequent protest supporters made use of the term panty raid — a march on the offices of the Toronto Police Services' 52 Division on October 28 features protestors, including male and female supporters waving undergarments in the air. City councillor Kyle Rae was sued for defamation by officers involved, for referring to the investigation as "a panty raid."
- October 26: In a segment on social conservatism in Canada which aired on TVOntario's news magazine series Fourth Reading during the 2000 Canadian federal election campaign, Canadian Alliance candidate Kevyn Nightingale faces criticism after he calls fellow panelist Randall Pearce, an openly gay candidate for the Progressive Conservative Party of Canada, a "statistical deviant". Nightingale then defends his words by asserting that as a Jew, he is also "statistically a deviant" himself.

=== 2001 ===
- June 10: Joe Clark marches as the grand marshal of Calgary Pride, becoming the first former Prime Minister of Canada ever to attend a Pride parade in that capacity.
- June 13: Prime Minister Jean Chrétien nominates historian and former co-host of CBC public affairs show This Hour Has Seven Days Laurier LaPierre to senate, making him the first ever out senator in Canada.
- September 7: PrideVision, the world's first LGBT-specific television channel, is launched by Headline Media Group.
- November 17: In one of Canada's most notorious anti-gay hate crimes, Vancouver resident Aaron Webster is assaulted and killed in Stanley Park by four young offenders. A march and vigil commemorating Webster and protesting anti-gay violence is held the following day.
- November 29: Yukon MLA Dale Eftoda introduces his partner Robert Brown in the Yukon Legislative Assembly, becoming the first openly gay member of that body.

=== 2002 ===
- May 10: In Marc Hall v. Durham Catholic School Board, a judge orders the Durham Catholic District School Board to allow Marc Hall, an openly gay student, to bring a same-sex date to the high school prom.
- December 12: Goliath's, a bathhouse in Calgary, Alberta, is raided by Calgary Police. Charges move very slowly through the courts; the Crown ultimately drops all charges against customers of the bathhouse in December 2004, but proceeds with charges against the bathhouse owners.
- December: Nova Scotia Progressive Conservative MP Scott Brison, who was openly gay in Ottawa social circle, comes out publicly to preempt whisper campaign as he explores a party leadership bid.

=== 2003 ===
- May 31, 2003: Scott Brison places fourth at the 2003 Progressive Conservative leadership convention. Following the merger of the Progressive Conservative Party and the Canadian Alliance in December that, Brison crosses the floor to the Liberal bench.
- June 12: The Court of Appeal for Ontario rules, in Halpern v. Canada, that the common law definition of marriage as being between one man and one woman violates section 15 of the Canadian Charter of Rights and Freedoms. The decision immediately legalizes same-sex marriage in Ontario, and sets a legal precedent – over the next two years, similar court decisions legalize same-sex marriage in seven provinces and one territory before the federal Civil Marriage Act is passed in 2005.
- June: Prominent gay lawyer David Corbett is appointed a justice of the Ontario Superior Court of Justice, with media reports erroneously stating him as the first openly gay judge appointed to a superior court. (Justice Ian Nordheimer was appointed to the same court four years prior.)
- October 2, 2003: Ontario provincial election expands the LGBT contingent at Queen's Park's from one to two. Newly elected Liberal MPP Kathleen Wynne, the first out woman elected to a legislature in Canada, joins fellow Liberal George Smitherman. Three weeks later on October 23, George Smitherman swears in as Ontario's Minister of Health, holding the largest-budget portfolio in the newly elected Liberal McGuinty Ministry, becoming the first openly LGBT person to serve in Ontario cabinet. (See also: Wynne's elevation to cabinet in 2006, becoming first minister in 2013, winning general election in 2014)
- November 15: With same-sex marriage recognized by the courts, British Columbia cabinet minister Ted Nebbeling becomes Canada's first serving cabinet minister to legally marry his same-sex partner.
- November: Parti Quebecois MNA Agnès Maltais, first elected in 1998 and a cabinet minister in the earlier Bouchard and Landry governments, became the second out woman serving in a provincial legislature when she came out in a public speech in Laval. She would secure her first re-election as an out Lesbian in March 2007, and becomes Quebec's first out Lesbian cabinet member when the BQ returns to power in 2012 under Pauline Marois .

=== 2004 ===
- March 24: Ontario MPP Dominic Agostino dies. Shortly after his death, he is outed by the Toronto-based LGBT magazine fab in a published a piece titled "Why Did He Die a Straight Man?" Neither Agostino nor his friends have any comment on the matter, though Agostino was quoted as saying: "As long as you are consistent, your private life should remain private."
- June 28: The federal election returns five out MPs, the largest contingent up to this point in history. Newly elected NDP MP Bill Siksay, who succeeds his former boss Svend Robinson, Canada first out MP who stood down after 25 years in parliament, and Liberal MP Mario Silva, a former Toronto city councillor, share the distinction as Canada First MPs who were openly LGBT when first elected. Liberal Scott Brison and NDP Libby Davies, both first elected in 1997, secure their re-election as out candidates for the first time, along with long time out MP Réal Ménard.
- July 20: Scott Brison joins the Liberal cabinet of Paul Martin as Minister of Public Works following the June federal election, and becomes Canada first out federal cabinet minister.
- August 13: Police raid the Warehouse baths in Hamilton, Ontario.

=== 2005 ===
- March 24: Liberal Prime Minister Paul Martin nominates Nancy Ruth, a former member of the Progressive Conservative Party, to the Senate, making her Canada's first openly lesbian senator and second out senator. Her nomination comes four months after Canada's first out senator Laurier LaPierre's mandatory retirement. The next two out senators will not take office for more than 10 years, in November 2016, less than two months before Nancy Ruth's mandatory retirement.
- May 17: Gay MLA Lorne Mayencourt is reelected in Vancouver-Burrard in the British Columbia provincial election, and gay candidate Nicholas Simons is elected to his first term in Powell River-Sunshine Coast. Mayencourt's victory is not finalized until early June, however, due to a recount battle with gay challenger Tim Stevenson, his predecessor for the seat.
- June 26: On the 25th anniversary of Toronto's Pride Week, Bill Blair becomes the first chief of police in the city's history to participate in the parade.
- July 20: The federal Civil Marriage Act, legalizing same-sex marriage across Canada, is given royal assent.
- September 25: Allison Brewer wins the leadership of the New Brunswick New Democratic Party, becoming the first openly LGBT Canadian to lead a political party in Canada. The party was not a major political force in New Brunswick and had never won more than one seat. The party lost its only seat under Brewer's leadership the following year, and Brewer herself never held a legislative seat.
- November 15: The openly gay André Boisclair wins the leadership of the Parti Québécois, the official opposition party in Quebec, becoming the first out leader of a political party with recognized parliamentary status. He re-enters the National Assembly the following year in August 21, 2006 and formally becomes the Leader of the Opposition of Quebec.

=== 2006 ===
- January 23: Despite the Conservatives winning the federal elections, all five out MPs retained their seats.
- March 13: At the 26th Genie Awards, the gay-themed film C.R.A.Z.Y. wins the Genie Award for Best Motion Picture.
- July 26 - August 5: Montreal hosts the 2006 World Outgames. On July 29, the Declaration of Montreal, an international statement of principle pertaining to the human rights of LGBT people around the world, is adopted at a conference held as part of the festivities.
- September 18: Kathleen Wynne is sworn in as Ontario's Minister of Education and becomes the first out woman cabinet minister in Canada, and out health minister George Smitherman receives the additional title Deputy Premier of Ontario. Upon Wynne's appointment, the two ministries with the largest budgets in the Government of Ontario, Health and Education (together account for 60% of that year's budget) are both headed by out ministers.
- November: Divers/Cité, Montreal's primary LGBT pride festival since 1993, decides to reposition itself as a general arts and music festival. A new group, Fierté Montréal, incorporates to take over the management of the pride festival. Both events continue to coexist, at separate times during the summer, until Divers/Cité folds in 2015.

=== 2007 ===
- April 16: 103.9 Proud FM, Canada's first LGBT radio station and the first in the world operated by a commercial broadcaster rather than a community non-profit group, is launched in Toronto.
- October 10: Ontario provincial election again returns out MPPs and cabinet ministers George Smitherman and Kathleen Wynne. NDP MPP Paul Ferreira of York South—Weston, elected in a byelection just in February, loses a rematch with Laura Albanese. The NDP also fielded out candidates Andrea Németh, a former editor with fab, in Etobicoke—Lakeshore and Paul Pighin, the first openly HIV-positive person to run as a major party candidate for provincial office, in London West, both coming in distant third.

=== 2008 ===
- September 29: At an all-candidates debate staged for a high school student audience in Sudbury during the 2008 federal election, independent candidate David Popescu responds to a question about same-sex marriage by stating that "homosexuals should be executed". His remarks are widely criticized across Canada, and the Greater Sudbury Police Service investigates whether the comments constitute a crime under Canadian hate speech legislation. On October 2, he also calls for the execution of Egale Canada executive director Helen Kennedy in an interview on CFRB, leading to a second hate crimes investigation by the Toronto Police.
- October 14 federal election expands the contingent of out Members of Parliament to six, a new highwater mark, with newly elected Liberal MP Rob Oliphant in Don Valley West, the same district held provincially by Kathleen Wynne, the first openly Lesbian provincial legislator, minister, and later in 2013 the first openly LGBTQ first minister in Canada. Remarkably, both the out MP and MPP consistently throughout their electoral career have their strongest electoral performance in the neightbourhood of Thorncliffe Park, the community with the highest concentration of resides of Muslim faith in Canada.
- October 23–26: Vancouver Pride hosts the InterPride Annual World Congress for Pride organizers from around the world.
- October 29: Two provincial by-elections in British Columbia both returns out MLAs for the opposition NDP — Spencer Herbert is elected in Vancouver-Burrard, and Jenn McGinn is elected in Vancouver-Fairview.
- November 3: A lesbian couple, Jane Currie and Anji Dimitriou, are physically assaulted while waiting to pick up their son at Gordon B. Attersley Public School in Oshawa, Ontario by Mark Scott, the parent of another child at the school. Over 300 people gather outside Oshawa City Hall on November 14 to protest the incident. The Durham Regional Police Service later announce that the incident will not be prosecuted as a hate crime, as Scott neither advocated genocide nor incited anyone else to join in the attack.

=== 2009 ===
- February 5: Ryan Cran, one of the killers in the Aaron Webster incident of 2001, is released on parole after serving four years of a six-year sentence.
- March 5: Ontario's Ministry of the Attorney General announces that they have concluded their hate crimes investigation in the David Popescu incident of 2008, and officially charge Popescu with two counts of willful promotion of hatred, under Section 319(2) of the Criminal Code. His court appearance is scheduled for April 15.
- March 13: Shawn Woodward is charged with aggravated assault after physically attacking 62-year-old Ritchie Dowrey in Vancouver's Fountainhead Pub, allegedly because "He’s a faggot. He deserved it." Dowrey had briefly bumped into Woodward's shoulder, which the heterosexual Woodward characterized during his trial as a predatory sexual advance. Although Dowrey survived the assault, he suffered serious and permanent brain damage, and spent the entire rest of his life living in care facilities until his death in 2015.
- April 24: In the British Columbia provincial election campaign, Liberal candidate Marc Dalton faces controversy when an e-mail he sent to a colleague in 1996 is released to the media, in which he stated that:
  I am not against homosexuals as people, but I do not support their lifestyle choices. I believe homosexuality is a moral issue. Most of us agree on many morals: respect, honesty, kindness. There are also many behaviours and acts that most of us would not condone: rape, robbery, assault, drunken driving, pedophilia, incest and so on.
- May 12: On election night in British Columbia, out gay MLA Spencer Herbert is re-elected in Vancouver-West End and out gay MLA Nicholas Simons is re-elected in Powell River-Sunshine Coast. Out lesbian MLA Jenn McGinn is defeated in Vancouver-Fairview, but another out lesbian, Mable Elmore, is elected in Vancouver-Kensington.

== 2010s ==
=== 2010 ===
- January 1: Réal Ménard, former MP who left parliament in September, becomes Borough Mayor of Mercier-Hochelaga-Maisonneuve and a Montreal City Councillor.
- February 2: In an interview with Andy Barrie on CBC Radio One, Pamela Taylor, the Ontario Progressive Conservative Party candidate in the Toronto Centre by-election on February 4, outs federal cabinet minister John Baird when Barrie asks her if she can name an openly gay member of her party.
- February 4: Glen Murray, the openly gay former mayor of Winnipeg, is elected to the Legislative Assembly of Ontario in the Toronto Centre by-election, succeeding the openly gay George Smitherman after the latter resigns to run for Mayor of Toronto.
- February 8: The 2010 Winter Olympics begin in Vancouver and Whistler, British Columbia. The facilities in Whistler include the event's first-ever Pride House for LGBT athletes.
- February 17: During Olympic coverage on the French-language sports network RDS, commentators Claude Mailhot and Alain Goldberg suggest that figure skater Johnny Weir should undergo a gender test to see if he should be competing as a woman. The Quebec Council of Gays and Lesbians subsequently files a complaint with the Canadian Broadcast Standards Council.
- March 2: Liberal and New Democratic Party MPs criticize Jason Kenney, the federal Minister of Citizenship and Immigration, after it is revealed that he personally ordered the removal of references to Canada's tolerance and acceptance of LGBT people from the newest version of the ministry's study guide for prospective new citizens.
- May 21: Following controversy over the inclusion of the activist group Queers Against Israeli Apartheid in the 2009 Toronto Pride Parade, the event's organizers vote to ban the use of the phrase "Israeli apartheid" from the 2010 parade, after councillor Giorgio Mammoliti brings a motion before Toronto City Council to have the city withdraw its funding from the event if the group is not banned.
- August: Shawn Woodward, who physically assaulted Ritchie Dowrey in Vancouver's Fountainhead Pub (see March 13, 2009), is found guilty of assault. Justice Jocelyn Palmer rejects Woodward's defense that Dowrey had groped him, ultimately finding that "[Woodward's] intention was to deny, deflect and dissemble. He fabricated this story to justify his outrageous assault." He is subsequently sentenced to six years in jail on November 8.
- October 2: Concurrently with a controversial spate of gay teen suicides in the United States, two lesbian teenagers are found dead in a forest near Orangeville, Ontario.
- October 18: The home of a gay couple in Little Pond, Prince Edward Island, is firebombed. Both men escaped the fire unharmed, but their home was destroyed. In late October and November, a series of rallies and fundraising concerts is held in both Little Pond and Charlottetown to support the couple and to oppose homophobic violence.

=== 2011 ===
- January 10: In a ruling by the Canadian Broadcast Standards Council, the Dire Straits song "Money for Nothing" is effectively banned from Canadian radio airplay after a gay resident of St. John's files a complaint because the lyrics contain the derogatory slur "faggot". The ruling is later rescinded on August 31, with the council leaving it to individual radio stations' discretion whether or not to play the song.
- January 13: British Columbia MLA Mike Farnworth comes out during the announcement of his candidacy for the BC NDP leadership, becoming the fourth openly gay member of the provincial legislature and the second out candidate for that contest. One of the most senior member in the legislature, Farnsworth was first elected in 1991, and was a senior minister in the Clark and Donsanjh ministries. Farnworth faced eventual winner Adrian Dix in the final third ballot, losing to Dix 52-48. The other out candidate Nicholas Simons, dropped out a week before the convention and endorsed a third candidate John Horgan, later Premier.
- April: The controversial activist group Queers Against Israeli Apartheid announces its withdrawal from the 2011 Toronto Pride Parade, after Toronto City Council reasserts its intention to withdraw funding support from the parade if the group participates.
- May 2: The federal election returns a majority conservative government. Incumbents NDP Libby Davies and Liberal Scott Brison, two veterans first elected in 1997, are reelected, but Rob Oliphant and Mario Silva, both Liberal MPs from Toronto, were casualties of the Liberal Party's worst electoral defeat in history. NDP Bill Siksay retires at this election, but the Orange Crush propels the NDP to official opposition for the first time also ushers in three out MPs: Randall Garrison of Victoria, and Dany Morin and Philip Toone from rural Quebec. The number of openly LGBT Members of Parliament remains at five.
- October 11: In the Newfoundland and Labrador provincial election, Gerry Rogers becomes the first openly gay politician ever elected to the Newfoundland and Labrador House of Assembly.
- October 14: Jamie Hubley, the son of Ottawa city councillor Allan Hubley, commits suicide after having blogged for a month about the anti-gay bullying he was facing at school. The bullying had begun as early as Grade 7, with students on Jamie's bus attempting to stuff batteries in his mouth because he preferred figure skating over hockey. The incident leads to several Canadian media and political figures posting videos dedicated to Hubley as part of the online It Gets Better Project, as well as an act of the Legislative Assembly of Ontario to impose stiffer penalties for bullying in schools which passes in 2012.

=== 2012 ===
- March 19: Craig Scott, a law professor at Osgoode Hall Law School, wins the federal by-election in Toronto—Danforth triggered by the death of NDP leader Jack Layton, bringing parliament's LGBT contingent back up to six.
- April 14: Allan Hunsperger, a Christian minister from Tofield, Alberta, running as a Wildrose candidate in the Alberta provincial election, becomes a focus of controversy when a blog post he wrote in 2011, in his capacity as a church minister, is publicized in the media. The blog post, structured and themed as a rebuttal to Lady Gaga's song "Born This Way", asserts that "accepting people the way they are is cruel and not loving", and that gay people are destined to "suffer the rest of eternity in the lake of fire".
- April 17: Halifax gay activist Raymond Taavel is beaten to death outside Menz & Mollyz, a gay bar on the city's Göttingen Street, by Andre Denny, a paranoid schizophrenic on an unsupervised leave from a nearby mental hospital, after attempting to break up a fight between Denny and another man. Taavel was a former chair of the city's gay pride festival and a former editor at the LGBT magazine Wayves and worked at the spiritual magazine Shambhala Sun. Over 1,000 people attend a vigil in Taavel's memory later the same evening, which includes performances by poet Tanya Davis, actor and writer Stewart Legere and singer-songwriters Rose Cousins and Ria Mae. Although there were unconfirmed allegations that Denny used anti-gay slurs while attacking Taavel, to date media and the police have not asserted that the case clearly constituted a hate crime, generally attributing the attack to Denny's mental illness rather than to a specifically anti-gay bias. Ironically, Taavel had previously survived a more clearly anti-gay physical attack, which he wrote about in Wayves in May 2010.
- April 18: For the second year in a row, Toronto Mayor Rob Ford declines an invitation to attend the city's annual Pride Parade, on the grounds that it conflicts with his family's traditional cottage weekend. Unlike in 2011, however, he subsequently attends a PFLAG event on May 17 to mark the International Day Against Homophobia.
- April 20: Due to a channel switching error at Shaw Cable facilities in Hamilton, the morning newscast on CHCH-TV is replaced for three minutes by a clip of a gay porn movie.
- May 19: Following a legal battle to reverse her disqualification for not being a "naturally born female", Vancouver resident Jenna Talackova successfully becomes the first transgender woman to compete in a Miss Universe pageant. She does not make the Top 5, but is one of four contestants awarded the title of "Miss Congeniality".
- November: Twenty LGBT officers of the Royal Canadian Mounted Police release an online video as part of the international It Gets Better Project.
- December 6: Bill No. 140 of the 61st General Assembly of Nova Scotia known as the Transgendered Persons Protection Act was given Royal Assent by the then Lieutenant Governor of Nova Scotia Mayann Francis. It added both gender identity and gender expression to the list of things explicitly protected from harassment in the province's Human Rights Act.

=== 2013 ===
- February 11: Two weeks following her upset victory at the Ontario Liberal leadership convention, Kathleen Wynne, the first out leader of a governing party in Canada, takes office as Premier of Ontario, and become both Ontario's first female premier and Canada's first openly LGBT first minister. Her premiership makes Ontario, with its population of over 13 million, the jurisdiction with the largest population with an openly LGBTQ head of government anywhere in the world, displacing Belgium (with population of 11 million held the distinction since 2011) for the distinction and held it for 11 years until 2024 (when Gabriel Attal was appointed Prime Minister of France).
- March 12: Pink Triangle Press announces the discontinuation of long-running Toronto LGBT magazine fab.
- March 20: The House of Commons passes Bill C-279, a private member's bill sponsored by Randall Garrison, which officially extends human rights protections to transgender and transsexual people in Canada. The bill passes with virtually unanimous support on the opposition benches, as well as 18 members of the governing Conservative Party caucus, although the majority of Conservatives are opposed.
- April 2: The gay owners of a restaurant in Morris, Manitoba, announce that they are closing the establishment, just three months after opening it, due to homophobic persecution by some residents of the town. The situation draws widespread criticism across Canada, including comments of support for the owners from Morris mayor Gavin van der Linde, Manitoba premier Greg Selinger and opposition leader Brian Pallister; Selinger announces that he will have lunch at the restaurant during his upcoming flood preparation tour of the Red River Valley region.
- April 18: ProudPolitics, a new cross-partisan organization dedicated to creating networking and fundraising opportunities for LGBT politicians and candidates, launches in Toronto.
- June 6: The Toronto Police Service announces that they are investigating the possibility that three unsolved missing persons cases involving men who were last seen in the Church and Wellesley neighbourhood, the city's primary gay village, may be linked. All three are eventually linked to the Bruce McArthur investigation and arrest in 2018.
- June 7: Edmonton Pride begins with a raising of the rainbow flag on the grounds of CFB Edmonton, the first time in Canadian history that the flag has flown on a military base.
- June 24: For the first time in his mayoralty, Rob Ford attends the annual kickoff of Toronto's Pride Week to read the official city proclamation.
- June 30: Out Ontario Premier Kathleen Wynne marches in the Pride Toronto parade, the first incumbent Premier of Ontario to do so. This makes her the third incumbent first minister in Canada to match in a pride parade, following BC Premier Ujjal Dosanjh in 2000 and Alberta Premier Allison Redford the previous year. She led the liberal float with federal Liberal leader Justin Trudeau who would become the first incumbent Prime Minister to match in 2016. This summer, the incumbent premiers of the four largest provinces, all women, all match in pride parades in their respective provinces. In addition to Wynne in Toronto, BC Premier Christy Clark matches in the Vancouver Pride Parade on August 4, Quebec Premier Pauline Marois matches in Fierté Montréal parade on August 18, and Alberta Premier Allison Redford was honoured as the grand marshal of Calgary pride parade on September 1.
- June 19: Media begin to publicize a series of threatening letters received by a lesbian couple in Kingston, Ontario, from an anonymous "small but dedicated group of Kingston residents devoted to removing the scourge of homosexuality in our city".
- August 7: REAL Women of Canada issues a statement criticizing Foreign Affairs Minister John Baird for speaking out on LGBT human rights issues in both Uganda and Russia as part of Canada's foreign policy.
- October 12: Scott Jones, a gay resident of New Glasgow, Nova Scotia, is stabbed by a knife-wielding man after leaving the Acro Lounge. He is left paraplegic by the attack. His journey of healing and recovery is later profiled in the 2018 documentary film Love, Scott.
- October 21: Priape, an LGBT-oriented clothing retailer with stores in Montreal, Toronto, Calgary and Vancouver, closes all four of its locations following bankruptcy proceedings filed earlier in the year. Following Quebec Superior Court approval of a purchase offer on October 30, the new owners announce that they will reopen the flagship store in Montreal, but that the other locations will remain closed.

=== 2014 ===
- February 4: St. John's City Council in St. John's, Newfoundland and Labrador unanimously votes to fly the rainbow flag at City Hall for the duration of the 2014 Winter Olympics, to protest anti-gay laws in Russia, setting off a national campaign which is quickly joined by the municipal councils of Gander, Happy Valley-Goose Bay, Corner Brook, Mount Pearl, and Stephenville in Newfoundland and Labrador; Halifax in Nova Scotia; Fredericton and Moncton in New Brunswick; Charlottetown and Stratford in Prince Edward Island; Gaspé, Gatineau, Laval, Montreal, Quebec City, Rimouski, Saguenay, Sherbrooke, Sorel-Tracy and Victoriaville in Quebec; Ottawa, Kingston, Hamilton, Guelph, London, Burlington and Toronto in Ontario; Regina and Saskatoon in Saskatchewan; Edmonton, Calgary, St. Albert and Lethbridge in Alberta; Vancouver, Whistler and Victoria in British Columbia; Whitehorse in Yukon; Yellowknife in the Northwest Territories; and Iqaluit in Nunavut. Toronto mayor Rob Ford initially objects to the gesture, but relents after conversations with several other city councillors encouraging him to reconsider. Kitchener also faces some controversy as it opts to display the flag inside city hall rather than on an outside flagpole. In addition, rainbow flags have also been raised on the grounds of the provincial legislatures of Alberta, Saskatchewan, Newfoundland and Labrador, Prince Edward Island, New Brunswick, Nova Scotia and Manitoba and the tower of Montreal's Olympic Stadium is being illuminated in rainbow colours. The three political parties in the Legislative Assembly of Ontario also filed a request to fly the flag at Queen's Park, which was initially declined because the existing protocol explicitly limited the special events flagpole to country flags and the Franco-Ontarian flag; when the legislature resumed for its spring session on February 18, the very first order of business placed on the agenda was a formal motion to raise the flag, which passed with the unanimous consent of all three parties.
- June 12: Ontario provincial election returned the Ontario Liberals led by out Premier Kathleen Wynne with a majority mandate. With this election, Ontario becomes the jurisdiction with largest population ever having elected a openly LGBTQ head of government. (Note: Ontario displaced Sicily, which elected Rosario Crocetta as President of its regional government in October 2012 when it had a population of 5 million. Since the 2014 Ontario election, the State of Rio Grande do Sul in southern Brazil, with a population of 11 million, having elected Brazil's first out state governor Eduardo Leite in 2018 and again in 2022, is the only other jurisdiction in the world with a population greater than ten million to have elected an openly LGBTQ head of government.) Until the 2025 Dutch general election (The Democrats 66 led by openly gay Rob Jetten won the largest share of votes, formation of government to be determined), no jurisdiction with a larger population has elected an openly LGBTQ head of government.
- June: Toronto hosts the 2014 edition of WorldPride.
- September: New Pride festivals launch for the first time in the Ontario cities of Sault Ste. Marie and Timmins.
- September 21: Jim Deva, an influential LGBT activist and co-owner of Little Sister's Book and Art Emporium in Vancouver, dies at age 65 following an accident in his home.
- December 2: The Canadian Olympic Committee, in collaboration with Egale Canada and the international You Can Play foundation, announces a new program to combat homophobia in sports by training Canadian athletes to speak on LGBT issues to students and youth groups. In conjunction with the announcement, the LGBT sports publication Outsports publishes three coming out profiles of Canadian Olympic athletes Rose Cossar, Kris Burley and Eric Radford.

=== 2015 ===
- January 14: Pink Triangle Press announces that it is discontinuing its three LGBT print news titles, Xtra Toronto, Xtra Vancouver and Xtra Ottawa, which will continue as an exclusively digital media publication after their final editions are published on February 12 (Vancouver and Ottawa) and February 19 (Toronto), 2015.
- February 23: Wade MacLauchlan is sworn in as Premier of Prince Edward Island, becoming Canada's second openly gay provincial premier.
- February 25: The Senate of Canada amends Bill C-279, the transgender equality bill passed by the House of Commons of Canada in 2013, in ways which are criticized as transphobic.
- February 26: Queers Against Israeli Apartheid, the activist group whose participation in Toronto's Pride Week parade of 2010 led to attempts by Toronto City Council to strip Pride's funding, announces that it is disbanding.
- May 4: Wade MacLauchlan's Prince Edward Island Liberal Party wins the Prince Edward Island provincial election. MacLauchlan wins his own seat as MLA for York-Oyster Bed, making him the province's first out gay Member of the Legislative Assembly.
- May 5: In the Alberta provincial election, candidates Michael Connolly, Ricardo Miranda and Estefania Cortes-Vargas win election to the Legislative Assembly of Alberta as the province's first three openly LGBT MLAs.
- May 22: The Montreal Alouettes of the Canadian Football League sign American player Michael Sam to a two-year contract, making him the first openly gay player in the league's history. Sam previously made history as the first openly gay player to be selected by a team in the NFL draft, but had been cut from the squads of two NFL teams before actually playing a game. He makes his official CFL debut on August 7 in a game against the Ottawa RedBlacks, but announces a week later that he is leaving the team for personal reasons.
- June 24: Film historian Thomas Waugh and filmmaker Kim Simard launch the Queer Media Database, an online project to collect and publish information about LGBT films made in Canada.
- June 28: For the first time in the history of Toronto's Pride Week, a contingent of federal Conservative Party of Canada MPs and provincial Ontario Progressive Conservative Party MPPs participates in the parade. Organized by the new LGBTory, the marching contingent includes federal MPs Kellie Leitch and Bernard Trottier, Ontario PC leader Patrick Brown and MPPs Lisa MacLeod and Jack MacLaren.
- July: In conjunction with the 2015 Pan American Games in Toronto, The 519 and the Church and Wellesley village partner in Pride House, a service for LGBT athletes. It is the first Pride House ever organized at a Pan American Games event, and only the second organized in Canada after the 2010 Winter Olympics in Vancouver.
- September 3: David Popescu, a fringe candidate who was convicted in 2009 on hate speech charges after advocating the public execution of homosexuals, is arrested a second time after similar claims that he distributed anti-gay literature during the Sudbury provincial by-election campaign in early 2015.
- September: Mackenzie Mountain School in Norman Wells, Northwest Territories, hosts the town's first-ever LGBT pride event.
- October 19: In the 2015 federal election, six LGBT Members of Parliament are elected to the House of Commons: Randall Garrison and Scott Brison as re-elected incumbents, Rob Oliphant as a former MP winning back his seat after having been defeated in 2011, and Randy Boissonnault, Seamus O'Regan and Sheri Benson as new MPs. Incumbent MPs Craig Scott, Dany Morin and Philip Toone are defeated, and Libby Davies retires from the House, leaving the overall number of LGBT MPs unchanged from the previous parliament. Unsuccessful LGBT candidates include Jennifer McCreath, a Strength in Democracy candidate in Avalon who is the first transgender candidate in a federal election in Canada.
- November 23: Julie Green is elected to the Legislative Assembly of the Northwest Territories as the first out LGBT member of that legislature.
- November 24: Michelle DuBarry, an 84-year-old drag queen in Toronto, Ontario, is awarded the title of World's Oldest Performing Drag Queen by the Guinness Book of World Records.
- December 1: During debate in the Legislative Assembly of Alberta on the inclusion of gender identity as protected grounds in the provincial Human Rights Code, MLA Estefania Cortes-Vargas (formerly reported in media as a lesbian-identified woman) formally comes out as genderqueer, becoming Canada's first transgender-identified holder of a major political office.
- December 17: Justin Trudeau indicates that he will attend Toronto's 2016 Pride parade, becoming the first sitting Prime Minister of Canada ever to attend a Pride event.
- December 17: Kael McKenzie is appointed to the Provincial Court of Manitoba, becoming Canada's first-ever openly transgender judge.

=== 2016 ===
- January 21: Through her foundation, Jennifer Pritzker gives a $2 million donation to create the world's first endowed academic chair of transgender studies, at the University of Victoria in British Columbia; Aaron Devor was chosen as the inaugural chair.
- February 2: Ricardo Miranda was appointed as Alberta's Minister of Culture and Tourism by Alberta premier Rachel Notley, and became Alberta's first openly gay cabinet member.
- February 23: The ceremonial first kiss shared between a sailor and their partner after returning from active duty in the Canadian Navy was between two men for the first time, at the Esquimalt Navy Base.
- February 28: CBC News reported that Prime Minister Justin Trudeau intended to recommend that a pardon under the authority of the Royal Prerogative of Mercy be granted posthumously to George Klippert, the last person in Canada to be imprisoned for homosexuality.
- May 17: Federal Minister of Justice Jody Wilson-Raybould introduces Bill C-16, which will update the Canadian Human Rights Act and the Criminal Code to include "gender identity and gender expression" as protected grounds from discrimination, hate publications and advocating genocide. The bill will also add "gender identity and expression" to the list of aggravating factors in sentencing, where the accused commits a criminal offence against an individual because of those personal characteristics. Although the New Democratic Party had introduced similar private member's bills several times in previous years, C-16 represents the first time such a bill has been put forward by the governing party in the House of Commons.
- June 1: For the first time in Canadian history, a pride flag is raised on Parliament Hill in Ottawa.
- June 6: Trans man Boyd Kodak wins a historic precedent-setting victory over Toronto Police Services, making world headlines and requiring the police service to revise all of its procedures and training regarding the trans community.
- June 22: Toronto Police chief Mark Saunders issues an official statement of regrets for the Operation Soap raids of 1981.
- July 3: The Toronto chapter of Black Lives Matter stages a protest as honoured guests of Pride Toronto, demanding more funding to people of colour events at pride, and removal of police floats in future parades.
- July 9: The city of Steinbach becomes the first rural community in Manitoba to host a Pride event. The march and rally united over 3,000 participants and made national headlines. The Steinbach Pride event was a significant milestone, as LGBT rights became formally recognized in a predominantly Mennonite community (with just over 15,000 residents).
- August 27: The city of Portage la Prairie, Manitoba, hosts its inaugural Pride, quickly following in the footsteps of Steinbach's Pride in July. The march, rally, and social attracted between 1,000 and 1,200 people - another milestone in a rural, Conservative area. Portage la Prairie, with a population of only 13,000, is one of the smallest communities to host a Pride event in Canada.
- September 17: The Reverend Canon Kevin Robertson is elected a bishop in the Diocese of Toronto, becoming the first openly gay bishop in the Anglican Church of Canada.
- November 10: Liberal Prime Minister Justin Trudeau nominated René Cormier and Kim Pate, along with 12 others, as senators. They becomes Canada 3rd and 4th out senators, joining the senate less than two months before the mandatory retirement of Senator Nancy Ruth, who has been the only out sitting Senator from the start of her tenure in March 2005.
- November 11: Toronto Police press 89 charges – only one of which is criminal in nature—against 72 people as part of 'Project Marie', an under-cover sting operation in a Toronto park long known for its gay cruising. Politicians and civil society groups speak out and provide pro bono legal support of those charged.
- November 15: Federal MP Randy Boissonnault is named as the government's LGBTQ issues advisor, with a mandate "to advance and protect the rights of the community and address historical injustices".
- November 25: In conjunction with the Strikers sports bar in Toronto, the Canadian Football League and You Can Play host the first-ever officially league-sponsored LGBTQ Grey Cup party.
- December: Longtime LGBTQ advocate Julie Lloyd to the Albert Court of Justice

=== 2017 ===
- January 17: Gabrielle Tremblay receives a Best Supporting Actress nomination at the Canadian Screen Awards, for her role in Those Who Make Revolution Halfway Only Dig Their Own Graves (Ceux qui font les révolutions à moitié n'ont fait que se creuser un tombeau), becoming the first transgender actress nominated for either a CSA or their predecessor Genie Awards.
- January 31: Brent Hawkes, the pastor of the Metropolitan Community Church of Toronto, is found not guilty of charges relating to allegations of indecent assault alleged to have occurred in 1974.
- March 12: At the 5th Canadian Screen Awards, the gay-themed film It's Only the End of the World wins the Canadian Screen Award for Best Motion Picture.
- June 19: Bill C-16, after having passed the legislative process in the House of Commons and the Senate, became law upon receiving Royal Assent which put it into immediate force. The law updated the Canadian Human Rights Act and the Criminal Code to include "gender identity and gender expression" as protected grounds from discrimination, hate publications and advocating genocide. The bill also added "gender identity and expression" to the list of aggravating factors in sentencing, where the accused commits a criminal offence against an individual because of those personal characteristics.
- June 3: The first known same-sex wedding involving an Inuk man takes place in Iqaluit between Joe Kucharski and Dwayne Nowdlak.
- July 9: Jeff Rock is announced as the new senior pastor of the Metropolitan Community Church of Toronto, to succeed Hawkes upon the latter's retirement in the fall.
- September 15: Justice Ian Nordheimer, the first known out justice appointed to a superior court in 1999, is promoted by federal justice minister Jody Wilson-Raybould to the Court of Appeal for Ontario, making him the first known out appellate court justice.
- November 28: Prime Minister Justin Trudeau offers an apology to the LGBTQ2S community in the House of Commons and the reparations process begins. Section 159 would be repealed. Errors from the Purge of the 1950s through the 1990s resulting in criminal records of individuals would be corrected by the destruction of such files. Civil servants and military personnel who lost their livelihoods from this discriminatory policy based on sexual orientation will share in a 110 million Canadian Dollar settlement of a class action suit.

=== 2018 ===
- January 11: Canadian Women's Hockey League player Jessica Platt comes out as a transgender woman, making her the first transgender woman to come out in North American professional hockey.
- January 18: Bruce McArthur is arrested in conjunction with the deaths of several men who went missing in Toronto's Church and Wellesley gay village between 2010 and 2017. He has to date been charged with eight counts of first-degree murder.
- February: Canadian Eric Radford becomes the first openly gay man to win a gold medal at any Winter Olympics.
- March 22: Playwright Natalie Meisner debuts Legislating Love, her play about Everett Klippert, at Sage Theatre in Calgary.
- April 8: Gerry Rogers becomes the first openly gay person to win the leadership of a Newfoundland and Labrador political party.
- June 6: Kathleen Wynne, Canada's and Ontario's first openly LGBT provincial premier, is defeated as premier in the 2018 Ontario general election; however, she is successfully reelected to the legislature as MPP in her own district. The other two out LGBT MPPs in the previous legislature, Cheri DiNovo and Glen Murray, retire from politics and do not run for reelection; however, Terence Kernaghan and Jill Andrew are elected, keeping LGBT representation in the legislature at three.
- June 1: The Fruit Machine, directed by Sarah Fodey, premieres at the Inside Out Toronto LGBT Film Festival. The documentary presents survivor accounts of the gay purge of the 1950s through 1990s in the Canadian military and civil service using the "fruit machine" as a scientific detection tool.
- June 13: Jim Egan, an important early gay rights activist, becomes the subject of the first Heritage Minute on an LGBTQ2 theme.

=== 2019 ===
- April 23: The Canadian Mint introduces a special Canadian dollar coin, designed by Vancouver LGBT artist Joe Average, to celebrate the 50th anniversary of the 1969 decriminalization of homosexuality in Canada.
- June 15: Pride Hamilton, the annual LGBTQ Pride event in Hamilton, Ontario, is disrupted by a violent anti-LGBTQ protest. The Hamilton Police Service subsequently face criticism, both for taking too long to respond to the immediate situation and for its post-confrontation arrests, which initially targeted people who were defending the event against the violence rather than the instigators of it. Later arrests did include some of the protestors. The community reaction includes direct pickets of mayor Fred Eisenberger's home, which Eisenberger characterizes as inappropriate harassment of his family and as not representative of the city's LGBTQ community.
- June 21: The Canadian Government repeals Section 159 of the Criminal Code, which prohibited anal intercourse except by a husband and a wife or two persons who are both 18 years or older, provided that the act was consensual and took place in private. The repeal of Section 159 eliminates the disparity in the age of consent for anal intercourse versus other sexual acts; the age of consent is now 16 for all sexual acts.
- July 5: Bill 8, an amendment to the Education Act that removes protections for gay-straight alliances in schools is passed after a lengthy debate in the Alberta legislature.
- August 17: In an op-ed to the Ottawa Citizen, Jim Watson announces that he is coming out of the closet, becoming Ottawa's first openly gay mayor and making Ottawa the largest city in Canada to have had an out LGBTQ mayor.
- October 21: The 2019 Canadian federal election returns out LGBT incumbents MPs Liberal Rob Oliphant and Seamus O'Regan and NDP Randall Garrison, along with newly elected Conservative Eric Duncan, the first openly gay Conservative elected MP (former MP Liberal Scott Brison, who retired a few months earlier, was not out when he won his first two elections as a Progressive Conservative). However, NDP Sheri Benson and Liberal Randy Boissonnault are defeated. LGBT representation in the House of commons reduces from six MPs to four.

== 2020s ==
=== 2020 ===
- January 21: Pride Toronto announces that Olivia Nuamah is no longer its executive director, as of January 15. Despite concerns from the organization's membership about the timing of her departure just months before the 2020 event, the board declines to clarify the reasons for her departure, or even whether she resigned or was fired.
- March/April: Due to the COVID-19 pandemic in Canada, both Pride Toronto and Fierté Montréal, Canada's two largest and most prominent pride festivals, are cancelled. Several pride festivals cancel their regular events, but announce plans to proceed with online "digital pride" festivals, including Vancouver Pride, Calgary Pride, Capital Pride (Ottawa) and Sudbury Pride. Vancouver Pride is additionally targeted during this time by scammers who post fraudulent posters around the city's West End to solicit donations via Bitcoin.
- May/June: Pegasus, a popular bar in Toronto's Church and Wellesley village, announces that it is at risk of closing because its landlord is refusing to participate in the Canada Emergency Commercial Rent Assistance program. The federal government program had been designed to help protect small businesses from closure by subsidizing their rent during the coronavirus shutdown, but still leaves businesses vulnerable because it requires buy-in from the landlord as well. In early June, it is announced that the landlord has finally agreed to participate in the program.
- March: Due to COVID-19 and its associated shutdowns of LGBT bars and events, Toronto residents Ceréna Sierra, Casey MQ, Brad Allen and Mingus New launch the Zoom-based Club Quarantine DJ nights, which grow to become an international phenomenon.
- June 24: Out lesbian singer-songwriter Safia Nolin coordinates Saint-Jeanne, an LGBTQ-inclusive Saint-Jean-Baptiste Day livestream whose participants include comedians Tranna Wintour and Karl Hardy, actress and writer Gabrielle Tremblay, songwriter and producer Annie Sama (Apigeon), rapper Backxwash and drag queens Kiara, Matante Alex and Gisèle Lullaby.
- June 24: CBC Gem and Buddies in Bad Times collaborate on Queer Pride Inside, an online event hosted by Elvira Kurt and featuring performances by Beverly Glenn-Copeland, Teiya Kasahara, Yovska, Ivan Coyote, Les Femmes Fatales, Gay Jesus, Cris Derksen, Luna DuBois, Pearle Harbour, Tawiah M'carthy, Stewart Legere, Alexis O'Hara, Trey Anthony and Ryan G. Hinds.
- July 2: The first season of Canada's Drag Race, the Canadian edition of the RuPaul's Drag Race franchise, premieres.
- August 14: All of the queens who competed in Canada's Drag Race participate in a special online edition of Fierté Montréal's annual Drag Superstars show.
- September 3: Priyanka is announced as the first season winner of Canada's Drag Race.
- May 13: Charlotte Gauthier is elected to the municipal council of Gillams, Newfoundland and Labrador in a by-election, becoming the province's first out transgender municipal councillor.

=== 2021 ===
- June 8: The business improvement association in Toronto's Church and Wellesley gay village calls for the removal of the Alexander Wood statue from the corner of Church and Maitland Streets, following the revelation that Wood was involved in the Society for Converting and Civilizing the Indians and Propagating the Gospel Among Destitute Settlers in Upper Canada, which contributed to the creation of the Indian residential school system in Canada.
- June 9: The Ottawa Redblacks of the Canadian Football League announce the suspension of Chris Larsen after his participation in a gay-bashing attack is alleged. Larsen was drafted by the team in 2019, but has never yet played on the field in a Redblacks game. The police clear him of involvement on June 16.
- June 26–27: With large-scale public events still curtailed by the COVID-19 pandemic, Pride Toronto again proceeds virtually. The event was hosted by Priyanka, with performers including Allie X, iskwē and Gary Beals. Despite the lack of an official Pride celebration, some small-scale participant-organized Pride events did take place over the weekend, including a Dyke March and a No Pride in Policing rally.
- September 20 - The federal election returns a record nine openly LGBTQ MPs. Incumbent Liberals Rob Oliphant and Seamus O'Regan, NDP Randall Garrison, and Conservative Eric Duncan are all reelected, while former Edmonton Liberal MP Randy Boissonnault regains his old seat. They were joined by first time MPs Liberal Pascale St-Onge, Conservative Melissa Lantsman, and NDP Blake Desjarlais and Lisa Marie Barron. Desjarlais, additionally, is the first two-spirit MP ever elected. In addition to O'Regan retaining his cabinet seat, Boissonnault and St-Onge also joined the Trudeau cabinet, setting a record for LGBTQ representation in cabinet.
- September 28 - Ophelia Ravencroft wins a seat on St. John's City Council in the 2021 Newfoundland and Labrador municipal elections, becoming the city's first out transgender city councillor. Additionally, Charlotte Gauthier, who joined the municipal council of Gillams in a 2020 by-election as the first transgender municipal councillor provincewide, is reelected to a new full term.
- December 1 - After a bill banning anti-LGBTQ conversion therapy died on the order paper due to the 2021 election, an all-party agreement in the Canadian House of Commons fast-tracks the approval of the bill by unanimous consent. The bill is subsequently unanimously approved by the Senate of Canada on December 7.

=== 2022 ===
- March 17 - The CBC premieres CBX: Canadian Ballroom Extravaganza, a web series highlighting Canadian ballroom culture.
- April 4 - Following the 2021 revelations about Alexander Wood's role in the development of the Indian residential school system, the Wood statue in Toronto's Church and Wellesley village is removed.
- April 30 - After moving into a long-term care home due to early symptoms of dementia, legendary Toronto drag queen Michelle DuBarry sells a selection of her drag wardrobe and jewellery in a community fundraising sale at the 519.
- August 7 - Fierté Montréal cancels its planned parade just a few hours before it was set to begin, with organizers blaming a lack of volunteer security staff due to COVID. Despite the cancellation of the official parade, however, over 1,000 attendees stage their own informal pride march along the parade route.
- September 26 - Nathaniel Teed wins a by-election in Saskatoon Meewasin, becoming the first openly gay member of the Legislative Assembly of Saskatchewan.
- November - A new Heritage Minute commercial is released about the life and career of transgender singer Jackie Shane.
- November 7 - Suzette Mayr wins the Giller Prize for The Sleeping Car Porter, her novel about a closeted gay Black Canadian railway porter working in 1929.
- December 12 - Mark Neufeld, the chief of the Calgary Police Service, issues a public statement of apology for the Goliath's raid of 2002.

=== 2023 ===
- June 4 - Alex Simpson and Leandra Earl launch Lavender Wild, a one-day LGBTQ music festival at Ontario Place's Echo Beach stage.
- June 8 - Policy 713, an education policy in New Brunswick that ensures a safe educational environment for LGBTQ students in the province, was officially revised by the provincial government following a controversial month-long review led by Premier Blaine Higgs. Following the revision, similar legislation has been implemented in Saskatchewan.
- September 1 - CIRR-FM ("103.9 Proud FM"), launched in 2007 as Canada's and the world's first commercial radio station targeted specifically to an LGBT listening audience, is shut down by its owner Evanov Communications.
- September 20 - A national '1 Million March 4 Children' protest was carried out by hundreds of protesters throughout various cities in Canada, protesting against "gender identity curriculum" in schools.

=== 2024 ===
- March 9 - Any Other Way: The Jackie Shane Story, a documentary film about pioneering transgender musician Jackie Shane directed by Michael Mabbott and Lucah Rosenberg-Lee and co-produced by Elliot Page, premieres at the South by Southwest Festival
- May - Singer Theo Tams organizes The Rainbow Collective, a group of Canadian LGBTQ musicians who record the charity single "This Little Light" to benefit The 519. Participating musicians include Amanda Rheaume, BAYLA, Billy Newton-Davis, Bryn, Chrisy Hurn, Erica Fox, Iskwē, Jeffery Straker, Kayla Diamond, memyself&vi, Micah Barnes, Priyanka, Ralph, Raymond Salgado, Ryland James, Sebastian Gaskin, Steven Taetz, T. Thomason, Tafari Anthony, Your Hunni and Zenon.

=== 2025 ===
- April 24 - Noam Gonick's documentary film Parade: Queer Acts of Love and Resistance, an overview of several key moments in LGBTQ history in Canada, premieres as the opening film of the 2025 Hot Docs Canadian International Documentary Festival.
- April 28 - LGBTQ representation in Parliament declines significantly in the 2025 Canadian federal election, with just four LGBTQ people elected. Four LGBTQ incumbents from the prior Parliament (Randall Garrison, Seamus O'Regan, Pascale St-Onge and Randy Boissonnault) retired from politics and two (Blake Desjarlais and Lisa Marie Barron) were defeated on election day, with three incumbents (Rob Oliphant, Eric Duncan and Melissa Lantsman) re-elected and just one new LGBTQ MP (Ernie Klassen) elected to his first term.
- May 20 - Glad Day Bookshop, Toronto's and the world's oldest surviving LGBTQ-oriented bookstore, announces that for financial reasons it must vacate its longtime location in the city's Church and Wellesley neighbourhood, and will move to a new location on Lisgar Street in the Queen Street West area.

=== 2026 ===
- June 19 - The city of Toronto launches a pilot project to close Church Street, from Wellesley to Alexander, to traffic until August 21 to create a pedestrian zone.
- June 22 - Heritage Toronto unveils a historic plaque on Wellesley Street in Toronto, commemorating the mass protest mobilizations that galvanized the city's LGBTQ community in the wake of Operation Soap in 1981.
