= LGBTQ history in Canada =

Canadian pride flag

This article gives a broad overview of lesbian, gay, bisexual, transgender, and queer (LGBTQ) history in Canada. LGBTQ activity was considered a crime from the colonial period in Canada until 1969, when Bill C-150 was passed into law. However, there is still discrimination despite anti-discrimination law. For a more detailed listing of individual incidents in Canadian LGBTQ history, see also Timeline of LGBTQ history in Canada.

== 17th century ==
New France's first-ever criminal trial for the crime of homosexuality took place in September 1648, when a military drummer stationed at the French garrison in Ville-Marie, New France, was sentenced to the gallows for sodomy by the local Sulpician priests. After an intervention by the Jesuits in Quebec City, the drummer's sentence was commuted on the condition that he accept the position of New France's first permanent executioner. As only the drummer was placed on trial, the widespread consensus of many historians is that his sexual partner may have been a First Nations man who was not subject to French religious law.

== 18th century ==
During the colonial period in Canada a European system of beliefs and values was virtually imposed on the First Nations. As part of this enterprise, missionaries made some of the first observations of LGBTQ practices among native populations. Jesuit Joseph-François Lafitau spent six years among the Iroquois starting in 1711 where he made important discoveries about Iroquois society. About his observations of cross-gender behavior he later wrote, "If there were women with manly courage who prided themselves upon the profession of warrior, which seems to become men alone, there were also men cowardly enough to live as women."

== 19th century ==
Although same-sex activity between men was also punishable by death penalty in British North America, political figures proved to be as reluctant to enforce this as officials in New France had been. Although numerous men were sentenced to death by the courts on sodomy charges, there are almost no surviving records of a convicted sodomite actually being executed in Canada; rather, such death sentences were commonly commuted or pardoned by the colonial governors. Two prominent political figures in this era, Alexander Wood and George Herchmer Markland, were subjected to criminal investigations following allegations of homosexual activity, although both were let off on condition that they resign their political postings.

In 1859, Canada repatriated its buggery law in the Consolidated Statutes of Canada: "Every person guilty of the abominable crime of Buggery, committed either with mankind or with any animal, shall suffer death as a felon."

Buggery remained punishable by death until 1869, when a reform of Canadian criminal law removed the death penalty for all but the most serious crimes. A broader law targeting all homosexual male sexual activity ("gross indecency") was passed in 1892, as part of a larger update to the criminal law.

== 20th century ==
=== World War I ===
World War I was a watershed moment for LGBTQ Canadians, where for the first time many queer people who enlisted were able to meet and form connections with queer people from around the world. It was also a period of increased persecution for queer soldiers who were arrested and imprisoned because of their sexual orientation. At least 35 men were charged under "gross indecency" during the war.

=== 1940s–1950s ===
Changes to the Criminal Code in 1948 and 1961 were used to brand gay men as "criminal sexual psychopaths" and "dangerous sexual offenders". These labels provided for indeterminate prison sentences.

=== 1960s ===
The "fruit machine" was employed in Canada in the 1950s and 1960s during a campaign to eliminate all homosexuals from the civil service, the Royal Canadian Mounted Police (RCMP), and the military. A substantial number of workers did lose their jobs. Although funding for the "fruit machine" project was cut off in the late 1960s, the investigations continued, and the RCMP collected files on over 9,000 "suspected" homosexuals.

The court case of Everett George Klippert caused much discussion of homosexuality among Canadians. He was the last person in Canada to be arrested, charged, prosecuted, convicted, and imprisoned for gross indecency for homosexuality before the decriminalization of homosexual acts in 1969; the reform was a direct result of the Klippert case. In 1965 Everett George Klippert was interrogated by the police as part of an arson investigation in the Northwest Territories. Klippert was arrested after admitting that he had had sex with other men. When psychiatrists determined that he was unlikely to stop having sex with men, he was declared a dangerous offender and sentenced to life in prison. Maclean's, Canada's popular newsweekly, then printed an article sympathetic to homosexuals. This led to increasing calls to reform Canada's law on homosexuality. Klippert was released in 1971.

Same-sex sexual activity was decriminalized in Canada as a result of legislation (Bill C-150) introduced in 1967 and passed in 1969 by then-Justice Minister and Attorney General of Canada, Pierre Trudeau (who later became the 15th prime minister of Canada). He famously commented, "There's no place for the state in the bedrooms of the nation."

=== 1970s ===
In 1971, Canada's first gay rights march, the We Demand Rally, took place in Ottawa. The Body Politic, Canada's first gay liberation newspaper, was published in Toronto and continued for about 15 years. A short run documentary series, Coming Out, became Canada's first LGBTQ television series when it aired on Maclean-Hunter cable in Toronto in 1972.

In 1973, several Canadian cities held gay rights events in conjunction with Pride Week 1973.

In 1974, four lesbians who became known as the "Brunswick Four" were involved in a historic incident in Toronto, Ontario. The four were evicted from the Brunswick House, a working-class beer hall on Bloor Street, and subsequently arrested, and three were later tried in Ontario Court for obstruction of justice. Two of those three women were acquitted in May 1974, but one, Adrienne Potts, served three months probation. Gay historian Tom Warner believes that the arrest and its consequences was a key incident ushering in a more militant gay and lesbian liberation movement in Canada, much as the Stonewall Inn riots politicized gays and lesbians in the United States. Warner also notes that this was one of the first occasions that a gay or lesbian topic received extensive press coverage in Canada.

In 1975 and 1976, there were large-scale protests after the police raided gay establishments in Quebec and in Ottawa in preparation for the 1976 Olympics.

The 1977 Mystique and Truxx bathhouse raids occurred in Montreal, which led within a few months to Quebec becoming the first jurisdiction (larger than a city or county) in the world to prohibit discrimination based on sexual orientation in the public and private sectors. The Quebec Charter of Human Rights and Freedoms prohibits discrimination in employment, housing and certain services and other activities, but it does not apply to federally regulated activities. The same year, the Canadian Immigration Act was amended, removing a ban on homosexual men as immigrants.

=== 1980s ===
==== 1980–1984 ====
On February 5, 1981, four gay bathhouses in Toronto were raided by the Toronto Police Service in Operation Soap. The event is now considered one of the crucial turning points in Canadian LGBTQ history, as an unprecedented community mobilization — now regarded as the Canadian equivalent of the 1969 Stonewall riots — took place to protest police conduct. One of the protest marches during this mobilization is now generally recognized as the first Toronto Pride event.

In 1982, Canada patriated its Constitution, to which it added the Canadian Charter of Rights and Freedoms. Section 15 of the Charter, which guarantees equality "before and under the law" and the "right to the equal protection and equal benefit of the law without discrimination" does not explicitly list sexual orientation, but was designed to be inclusive and allow the courts to find that specific grounds are included. In 1995, the Supreme Court of Canada ruled in Egan v Canada that sexual orientation should be read in to Section 15.

In 1983, the Quebec Gay Archives was established.

In 1984, Pink Triangle Services becomes the first registered gay charity, later becoming inclusive of all people in the queer community re-branding as PTS a centre for the celebration of sexual and gender diversity.

In the 1980s, several attempts were made to add sexual orientation into the federal government's Human Rights Act, an amendment that did not take place until 1996.

==== 1985–1989 ====
In 1986, sexual orientation was added to the Ontario Human Rights Code as a prohibited ground for discrimination. Like most other human rights acts in Canada, this act prohibits discrimination in employment, housing, services and certain other activities in the public and private sectors, but it does not apply to federally regulated activities. Egale Canada is founded.

In early 1987, sexual orientation was included in the newly adopted Yukon Human Rights Act and later that year added to the Manitoba Human Rights Code.

In 1987, the Public Service Alliance of Canada negotiated benefits for the same-sex partners of Northwest Territories government employees—a first in Canada for public sector workers.

In 1988, New Democratic Party Member of Parliament (MP) Svend Robinson became the first MP to come out, declaring that he is gay to the media outside the House of Commons. In the same year, the United Church of Canada became the first church in Canada to allow the ordination of gays and lesbians.

=== 1990s ===
==== 1990–1994 ====
In 1990, Yukon government employees became the second public sector workers in Canada whose same-sex partners were eligible for spousal benefits, including a dental plan.

In 1991, sexual orientation was added to the Nova Scotia Human Rights Act.

In 1992, then-Justice Minister and Attorney General of Canada, Kim Campbell (who later became Canada's first female prime minister) announced that Canada was lifting its ban on homosexuals in the Canadian Forces, allowing them to serve openly and live on-base with their partners. Canada was one of the first modern countries to allow homosexuals in the military due to the court decision of Haig v Canada, 1992 CanLII 2787 (ON CA). Sexual orientation was added to the human rights laws of New Brunswick and British Columbia.

In 1993, sexual orientation was added to the Saskatchewan Human Rights Act. The Supreme Court of Canada rejected a discrimination claim based on sexual orientation in Canada (Attorney General) v. Mossop because the Charter was not used to argue the case.

In 1994, the Supreme Court ruled that gays and lesbians could apply for refugee status based on their sexual orientation. A raid in a Montréal bar where 300 persons were maliciously (and falsely) charged with being in a bawdy house eventually turned into a scandal that eventually led to the resignation of the chief of police.

==== 1995–1999 ====
In 1995, the Supreme Court of Canada ruled in Egan v. Canada that sexual orientation should be read in to Section 15 of the Canadian Charter of Rights and Freedoms, a part of the constitution. The ruling had a wide impact since section 15 applies to all laws, including human rights acts that prohibit discrimination by all employers, landlords, service providers and governments. A court in Ontario ruled that gay and lesbian couples wishing to adopt jointly should be allowed to do so, making Ontario the first province to allow this. Currently, nearly all provinces allow gay and lesbian couples (and single gays and lesbians) to adopt children. The Newfoundland Human Rights Act was amended to include sexual orientation.

In 1996, sexual orientation was added to the Canadian Human Rights Act, an anti-discrimination law that applies to federally regulated activities throughout Canada. That same year, the Green Party became the first to endorse the legalization of same-sex marriage, becoming the first federally registered party to do so.

In 1998, the Supreme Court of Canada decided in the Vriend v. Alberta case that section 15 of the Canadian Charter, as interpreted in Egan v. Canada, required that the Alberta human rights law be read and applied as if the words sexual orientation were included. Glen Murray was elected Mayor of Winnipeg becoming the first openly gay mayor of a large North American city. The Prince Edward Island Human Rights Act was amended to include sexual orientation.

In 1999, gays and lesbians scored a major victory when the Supreme Court of Canada ruled, in M. v. H., that gay and lesbian couples should have the same rights as heterosexual common-law couples. In June 1999, a 216–55 vote in the House of Commons supported preserving the legal definition of "marriage" as the union of a man and a woman. Sexual orientation is included in the newly adopted Nunavut Human Rights Act.

=== 2000s ===
==== 2000–2004 ====
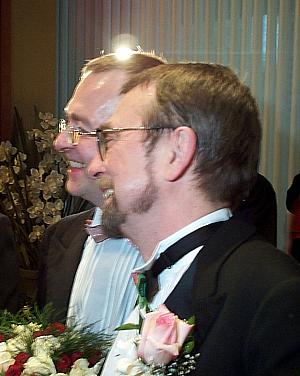
Michael Hendricks and René Leboeuf, the first legally married same-sex couple in the Canadian province of Quebec

In April 2000, the federal Liberal government responded to the 1999 Supreme Court decision by passing a bill (C-23) which amended 68 federal statutes, including pension benefits, bankruptcy protection, income taxes, old age security, and immigration, among others, to grant equal rights to homosexual common-law couples.

In 2000, in the case of Little Sisters Book and Art Emporium v. Canada (Minister of Justice), the Canadian Supreme Court ruled that gay publications, even those that were sexually explicit were protected by the freedom of speech and expression clauses in the Canadian Charter of Rights and Freedoms. Little Sister's Book and Art Emporium, however, has continued to litigate against what it considers to be discriminatory border practices.

In 2001, NDP MP Libby Davies publicly acknowledged she had a domestic partner who was a woman, becoming the country's first woman member of Parliament to come out.

In 2002, sexual orientation and gender identity were included in the Northwest Territories Human Rights Act.

In 2003, the British Columbia Court of Appeal made a unanimous decision that limiting the definition of marriage to heterosexual couples violated equality rights. The ruling was not effective immediately, but allowed a two-year transition period for Ottawa to legally recognize same-sex marriage. In June, the Ontario Court of Appeal upheld the decision of a lower court to allow same-sex marriage.

In May 2004, the House of Commons and the Senate passed Bill C-250, which added sexual orientation to the "hate propaganda" section of the Criminal Code, thus making it illegal for people to propagate hate based on sexual orientation. This did not include clergymen however.

In July 2004, Scott Brison, who had previously run for the leadership of the Progressive Conservative Party of Canada was appointed Minister of Public Works and Government Services by Liberal Prime Minister Paul Martin, becoming Canada's first openly gay cabinet member.

In December 2004, the Supreme Court of Canada replied to the federal government's draft legislation that would legalize same-sex marriage nationwide. The court ruled that the federal government has the exclusive authority to define marriage, that same-sex marriage was constitutional and was far from violating it, in fact "it flowed from" it, and that religious officials can't be forced to perform gay weddings. The court refused to answer whether or not the traditional definition of marriage was consistent with the Charter.

==== 2005–2009 ====
On June 28, 2005, by a vote of 158–133, the House of Commons passed Bill C-38, the Civil Marriage Act and on July 19, 2005, by a vote of 47–21, the Senate gave its approval to the bill.

On July 20, 2005, C-38 received royal assent from Chief Justice of Canada, Beverley McLachlin, acting in her role as deputy governor general. Canada became the fourth country to officially sanction same-sex marriage nationwide, behind the Netherlands, Belgium, and Spain. Same-sex marriages began in Ontario and British Columbia in 2003, with other provinces following via court challenges. The Ontario Court of Appeal ordered a religious same-sex marriage that was performed in January 2001 legally valid, thus retroactively making it the first legal same-sex marriage in modern times (as The Netherlands did not legalize same-sex marriage until April 2001).

In 2006, the International Conference on LGBT Human Rights was held in Montreal, culminating with the issuance of the Declaration of Montreal. The Borough of Ville-Marie in Montreal soon became the first government in the world to adopt the declaration, and the New Democratic Party became the first political formation in the world to do so at its convention in September.

As of 2009, all provinces and territories had included sexual orientation in their human rights laws, and the Northwest Territories include gender identity in theirs.

=== 2010s ===
In February 2011, the House of Commons passed at third reading NDP MP Bill Siksay's Bill C-389, to amend the federal Canadian Human Rights Act to include gender identity and gender expression as prohibited grounds of discrimination under Canadian federal anti-discrimination laws, at third reading, but it died on the order paper in the Senate when Parliament was dissolved. The bill was reintroduced as Bill C-279 in the subsequent Parliament and passed second reading on June 6, 2012. June 2012 also saw the addition of gender identity and gender expression to the Ontario Human Rights Code and of gender identity to the Manitoba Human Rights Code.

The May 2, 2011, election saw the arrival of a Conservative majority government. At the same time, the NDP became official opposition and elected the largest LGBTQ caucus in Canada's history, with four out LGBTQ New Democrat MPs, later increased to five.

On December 6, 2012, Bill No. 140 of the 61st General Assembly of Nova Scotia known as the Transgendered Persons Protection Act was given Royal Assent by the then Lieutenant Governor of Nova Scotia Mayann Francis. It added both gender identity and gender expression to the list of things explicitly protected from harassment in the province's Human Rights Act.

On January 26, 2013, Kathleen Wynne was elected leader of the Liberal Party of Ontario, and on February 11, 2013, was sworn into office as the 25th Premier of Ontario, becoming the first female and first LGBTQ first minister in the history of the province. By virtue of her office, Wynne is the highest ranking elected openly LGBTQ official in the history of North America.

On February 28, 2016, CBC News reported that Prime Minister Justin Trudeau intended to recommend that a pardon under the authority of the Royal Prerogative of Mercy be granted posthumously to Everett George Klippert, the last person in Canada to be imprisoned for homosexuality. Lawyer and LGBTQ activist Doug Elliott commented, "It's great that the young Trudeau is finishing the work that his father started."

On June 19, 2017 Bill C-16, after having passed the legislative process in the House of Commons and the Senate, became law upon receiving Royal Assent which put it into immediate force.

On November 28, 2017, Prime Minister Justin Trudeau offered an apology to the LGBTQ community in the House of Commons seeking to acknowledge and right many wrongs- to begin the healing process. Trudeau's broad apology for "state-sponsored, systemic oppression and rejection" included acknowledgement of the suppression of "two-spirit Indigenous values and beliefs" and "abusing the power of the law, and making criminals of citizens". This began the process in which records from those targeted during the Purge (from the 1950s through the 1990s) would be expunged as well as reparations paid to civil servants and military personnel who lost their livelihood from this Cold War–era policy affecting the LGBTQ community. Oppression extended beyond charging men for same-sex relations years beyond 1969's legalization of such, it includes the homophobic policies which furthered the larger communities homophobia resulting in an even greater social oppression that was detrimental to the well being of this sexual gender minority.

=== 2020s ===
After a bill banning anti-LGBTQ conversion therapy died on the order paper due to the 2021 election, an all-party agreement in the Canadian House of Commons fast-tracks the approval of the bill by unanimous consent. The bill is subsequently unanimously approved by the Senate of Canada on December 7, 2021.

== See also ==
- The ArQuives
- BC Gay and Lesbian Archives
- Quebec Gay Archives
