= Joe Rose (activist) =

Canadian LGBT rights activist

Joe Rose (December 27, 1965 – March 19, 1989) was a Canadian LGBT rights and HIV/AIDS activist whose homophobic murder was a pivotal moment for the LGBT rights movement in Quebec.

== Background ==
While attending Dawson College, Rose founded Etcetera, the college's LGBT association, in 1985. Rose studied nursing, and as a person living with AIDS, he wanted to found a Montreal chapter of ACT UP.

== Murder ==
On March 19, 1989, he and a friend were travelling on a Société de transport de la Communauté urbaine de Montréal (STCUM) night bus returning to his home in an HIV/AIDS hospice. Rose, who was slight in build and disabled by AIDS symptoms, and who dyed his hair pink, was set upon along with the friend by a group of four youths shouting homophobic slurs. They beat and stabbed him to death inside the bus. His friend suffered minor injuries; when emergency personnel arrived, they found him trying to resuscitate Rose.

Three minors, aged 14, 15, and 15, and Patrick Moise, aged 19, were ultimately charged and convicted in Rose's death. The youths were sentenced to varying terms in youth custody; Moise was sentenced to 7 years in prison. Rose's parents sued the STCUM for the driver's failure to activate the emergency signal, and were awarded $25,000.

== Impact ==
The murder was one of several around that time which forced the STCUM to review and revise its emergency safety procedures, and one of several which led the federal government to toughen penalties under the Young Offenders Act. Rose's father, Maurice Rose, felt that even the changes still did not go far enough, and was active for several years in lobbying to toughen penalties even further.

The murder galvanized the Montreal LGBT community. A candlelight vigil was held in Rose's honour at the Parc de l'Espoir, and hundreds of participants marched to the location of his death at the Frontenac metro station.

His death was covered by newspapers such as the Montreal Mirror, and in May, McGill University's CKUT-FM devoted a special 15-hour broadcast to programming about homophobia. Outrage over Rose's death also prompted the formation of Reaction SIDA, an AIDS activist group that organized a protest alongside ACT UP, during he Fifth International AIDS Conference in Montreal in June 1989. This led to the founding of the Montreal chapter of ACT UP, as Rose had wanted. Its first public activist event held at the entrance of the Complexe Desjardins in Montreal on March 19, 1990, was a "die-in" protest commemorating the first anniversary of Rose's death. A Montreal chapter of Queer Nation was also founded under the name Queer Nation Rose, both as a way of making the name bilingual and as a tribute to Rose.

The organizing that went on in response to Rose's murder laid the groundwork for the outraged community response to the Sex Garage raids in June 1990, another watershed moment in the Quebec LGBT rights movement. An ACT UP meeting held in response led to the formation of multiple community groups that formed the foundation of the LGBT rights movement in Quebec over the ensuing decades, including the holding of Quebec Human Rights Commission hearings about homophobic violence in 1994 and the introduction of benefits for same-sex partners in 1999.

The Etcetera association at Dawson College honoured Rose with a commemorative plaque in 2013, the 30th anniversary of his death was commemorated in 2019, and the 40th anniversary of the Etcetera club's founding was commemorated in 2025.

== Cultural depictions ==
Rose's murder was the inspiration for John Wojewoda's theatrical play Swarming, which premiered at the Montreal Fringe Festival in 1993. It was one of several murders of gay men in Montreal which were profiled in the 1994 CBC Television documentary Climate for Murder.

Author Michael Whatling named his 2009 short story collection about being out in high school, A Vigil for Joe Rose, in his honour.
