= Barbara Thornborrow =

Canadian military personnel

- Born: 1951 (age 74–75); Waterdown, Ontario, Canada
- Occupation: former Private in Canadian Armed forces
- Known for: LGBTQ+ Activism

Barbara Thornborrow is a former private who was involuntarily discharged from the Canadian Armed Forces for being a lesbian in 1977. She later challenged the decision, becoming the first person who was discharged based on their sexual orientation to do so publicly.

== Early activism ==
As a young adult, Thornborrow was active in the Hamilton-McMaster LGBT movement for which she visited universities and high schools discussing LGBT issues.

== Career ==
In 1977, Thornborrow was a private in the Canadian Armed Forces, stationed at Canadian Forces Base Rockcliffe in Ottawa, Ontario. On May 3, 1977, Thornborrow applied for voluntary release from the Canadian Armed Forces. Six days later on May 9, Thornborrow was called into the office of Sergeant Cochrane of the Canadian Forces' Special Investigations Unit (SIU) where she was questioned by Cochrane and a military policewoman about her alleged homosexuality. Thornborrow was informed that she was being questioned because allegations of homosexuality threatened national security by making her more susceptible to blackmail. The SIU interviewed her roommate and subsequently searched her room in search of evidence to use against her. The officers found gay pamphlets and old love letters. According to Thornborrow, “the officer came right out and said ‘we’ve got all the stuff, and it’s quite obvious that you are, so why don’t you admit it?” So I said, ‘Alright, I am.’” Thornborrow and the military officers returned to SIU headquarters where she was presented with an ultimatum: either sign the documents admitting she was a lesbian and be released from service within the month or seek psychiatric treatment. Thornborrow refused both options and asked to consult a lawyer.

Shortly after her dismissal, Thornborrow contacted Marie Robertson of Lesbians of Ottawa Now (LOON) who Thornborrow knew from Hamilton. Robertson contacted David Garmaise of Gays of Ottawa (GO) and they convened a meeting on May 16, 1977, of GO and LOON. During the meeting, Barbara was told that she probably was not going to be able to keep her job, but she could help other homosexuals by publicly sharing her story. With the help of the National Gay Rights Coalition (NGRC), Thornborrow issued a press release detailing her experience, bringing national attention to her case. She then accompanied members of the NGRC to “Parliament Hill where the Standing Committee on Justice and Legal Affairs was beginning a clause-by-clause study of the government's Canadian Human Rights Act,” including an amendment to forbid discrimination based on sexual orientation.

In response, the Canadian Forces issued a press release stating that Thornborrow was never pressured to leave the military as she had already requested voluntary release and it had been approved. On May 30, Thornborrow was promised that she would be “voluntarily released” under Item 4c on November 10, 1977, upon completion of the mandatory six-month waiting period.

However, on June 20, 1977, Thornborrow was informed by her commanding officer that she would be discharged under Item 5(d) as a person who is “not advantageously employable” and she had to leave the base by the end of the week. Colonel J.C. Boulet claims that granting Thornborrow a “voluntary release” was an administrative error and the Canadian Forces had considered honouring her request until the interviews and press releases. Boulet further stated “all earlier statements by forces spokesmen saying gays, on disclosure, could leave the services were wrong. ‘We do not condone homosexuality, and have to dismiss anyone who admits he is one.’”

== Honours ==
In honour of her role as a significant builder of LGBT culture and history in Canada, a portrait of Thornborrow by artist Barbara Augustine is held by The ArQuives: Canada's LGBTQ2+ Archives in its National Portrait Collection.

== See also ==
- Timeline of LGBT history in Canada
