= Aaron Webster =

Canadian murder victim

Aaron Webster (June 1959 - November 17, 2001) was a gay man living in Vancouver, British Columbia, Canada, who was beaten by a group of men close to a gay cruising area in a wooded part of Stanley Park near Second Beach on November 17, 2001. According to reports, the youths came across a nearly naked Webster and chased him to a parking area, where they beat him with baseball bats. After the beating, Webster was found unresponsive in the parking lot by his close friend Tim Chisholm, and died within minutes in Chisholm's arms.

Although some media called Webster's killing the first gay-related murder in Canadian history, much like the Matthew Shepard incident in the United States it merely attracted more widespread media attention than most earlier incidents.

The coroner's report listed the cause of Webster's death as "a blow to the left side or back of the victim's neck. This blow caused a tear to the vertebral artery which resulted in a massive and rapidly fatal hemorrhage at the base of the brain."

A march and vigil was organized by Little Sisters Bookstore co-owner Jim Deva, and took place the day after the killing, with hundreds of people marching through the streets of downtown Vancouver toward the site of Webster's death. Another rally, including British Columbia Human Rights Commissioner Mary-Woo Sims, was held several weeks later. Vigils were also held in several other Canadian cities.

The killing was widely covered in the national news in Canada, and led to significant controversy around whether the attack constituted a hate crime. The incident also received some coverage in the mainstream media in the United States, although gay media reported it far more prominently.

== Prosecution ==
The crime went unsolved for over a year. On February 12, 2003, police arrested the first of four suspects, a 19-year-old from Burnaby. Under Canada's Youth Criminal Justice Act, his name could not be published as he was only 17 at the time of the incident.

Although the police investigated the crime as a gay bashing, the prosecutor chose not to prosecute the case as an anti-gay hate crime, which under Canadian law would have permitted a stiffer sentence but may have been more difficult to prove — instead, the case was treated as a simple manslaughter resulting from a robbery. The teenager pleaded guilty and told the police investigator that "the idea was to find, [and] get in a fight with someone."

Three more young men were subsequently arrested. One, a youth when the crime was committed, was charged under the Youth Criminal Justice Act, and the other two, Ryan Cran and Danny Rao, were charged as adults.

Judge Valmond Romilly rejected the prosecution's assertion that the incident was not a hate crime, finding the first teenager guilty and calling the incident "a thug brigade, stalking human prey for entertainment in a manner very reminiscent of Nazi youth in pre-war Germany". Romilly handed down the maximum sentence permissible under the Act: two years in a youth detention centre and a third year under house arrest. The second young offender was also found guilty and sentenced to the same penalty, although the judge in that trial did not rule that the case constituted a hate crime.

Justice Mary Humphries ruled Cran guilty of manslaughter and sentenced him to six years in prison, but acquitted Rao on the grounds that inconsistent and conflicting testimony made his role in the attack unclear.

== Parole of Ryan Cran ==
Cran, who was incarcerated at Matsqui Prison in British Columbia, applied for parole on April 3, 2007, after serving two years of his sentence. The Canadian parole board denied his parole, as he had been caught drinking vodka in a minimum security prison and was deemed to still be a risk to society.

Cran was paroled on February 5, 2009. Spencer Herbert, the provincial MLA whose Vancouver-Burrard riding encompasses Stanley Park and Davie Village, subsequently called for the province to create a provincial telephone hotline for people to report gay bashing incidents and threats, as well as the appointment of a community victim services worker to investigate gay bashings.

== Legacy ==
Webster had been president of Cityview, a housing cooperative in Vancouver. In 2005, Cityview officially changed its name to Aaron Webster Housing Cooperative. The Cooperative Housing Federation of B.C. also launched an Aaron Webster Memorial Fund to finance diversity projects in housing cooperatives.

A memorial calendar was published in 2002 to raise funds by donation for a bench and shelter to be placed in Stanley Park in Webster's memory. Most of the images used were photos taken by Webster himself of Vancouver models. The calendar was sponsored by many Vancouver organizations. The calendar's reverse side featured a picture of Webster, as well as a poem by Deano Costa, "The Path".

Vancouver-based writer Stephen Gauer's debut novel Hold Me Now, published in 2011, was inspired by the Webster case.
