= Divers/Cité =

Music festival

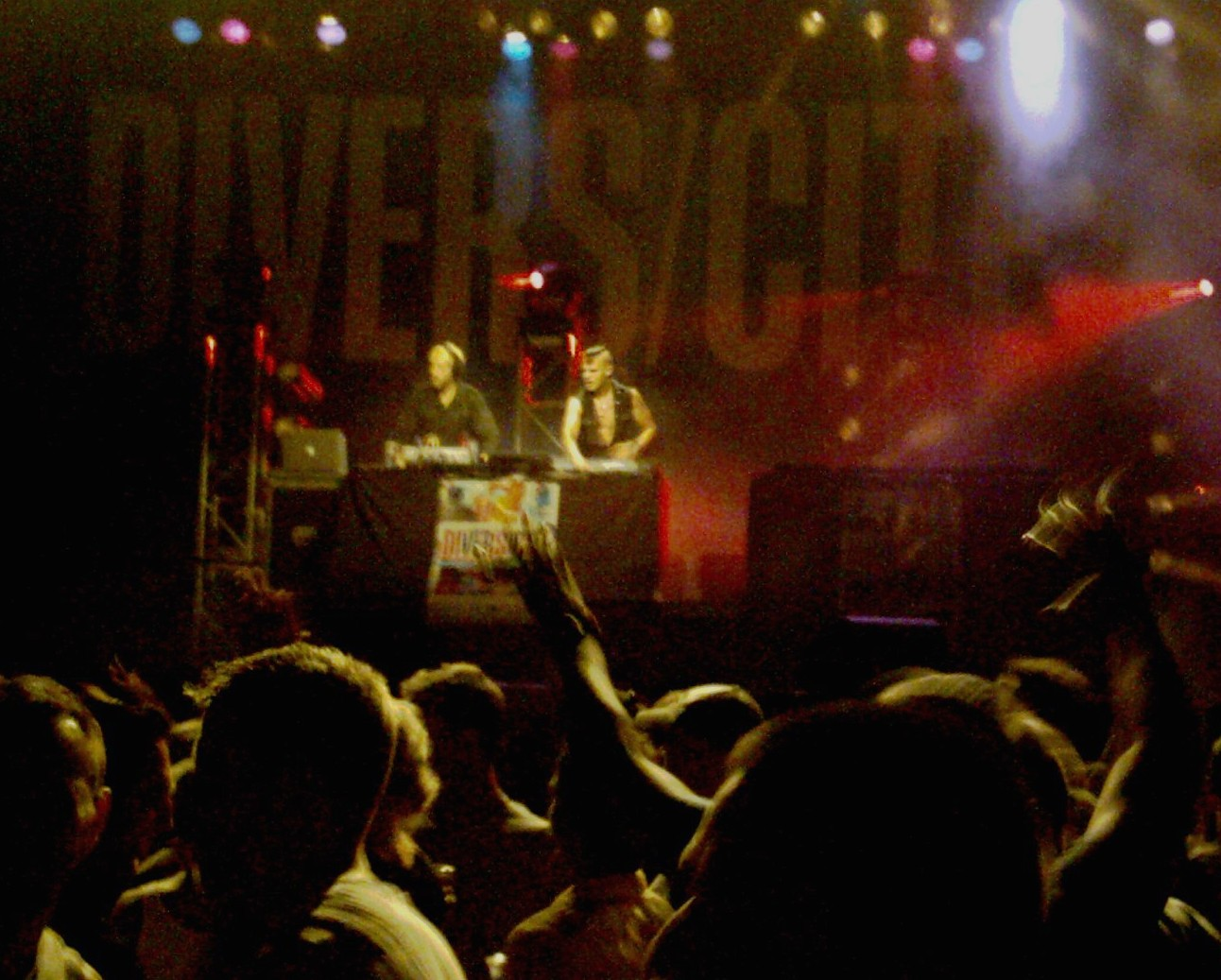
- Genre: Electronic music, multidisciplinary arts and music, jazz, pop, Latin, rock, house, R&B and electronica
- Location: Montreal
- Years active: 1993–2014

Divers/Cité was an LGBT multidisciplinary arts and music festival taking place each year in the heart of Montreal, since 1993. A week-long avant-garde event in the heart of downtown Montreal and in Montreal's Gay Village area held usually on the end of July and beginning of August every year, it was open to all audiences, gay and heterosexual, including many free events.

Organized in 1993 by Suzanne Girard and Puelo Deir, Divers/Cité served as a response to the Sex Garage raid of 1990. The event formerly served as Montreal's primary LGBT pride festival. An announcement in 2003 claimed that the Community Day in particular had as many as 200,000 attendees.

In 2006, that year's festival suffered a significant decline in attendance and revenues due to the city's contemporaneous hosting of the 2006 World Outgames; the increased number of LGBT tourists in town for the Outgames had been expected to be a financial boon for Divers/Cité, but according to Divers/Cité director Suzanne Girard, "even if there were more people than usual, there were 10,000 more things to do." As a result, later in the year the event dropped its Pride Parade mandate and was repositioned as an LGBT arts and culture festival, leading to the creation in 2007 of Fierté Montréal, the newly separate Pride Parade. As both events then took place at different times during the summer, the split sometimes led to confusion among tourists visiting the city.

In 2012, the event moved from Montreal's Gay Village to the Old Port.

Following a long history of financial difficulties, Divers/Cité filed for bankruptcy in May 2015.

== See also ==
- List of electronic music festivals
- Live electronic music
