= Everett Klippert =

Canadian man imprisoned for gross indecency (1926–1996)

- Born: Everett George Klippert; September 6, 1926; Kindersley, Saskatchewan, Canada
- Died: August 7, 1996 (aged 69); Bashaw, Alberta, Canada
- Criminal charges: Gross indecency
- Penalty: Preventive detention

Everett George Klippert (September 6, 1926 – August 7, 1996) was the last person in Canada to be arrested, charged, prosecuted, convicted, and imprisoned for gross indecency before the decriminalization of homosexual acts in 1969; decriminalization was a direct result of the Klippert case.

Klippert, originally from Kindersley, Saskatchewan, was raised in Calgary, Alberta. In 1960 he was convicted on eighteen charges of gross indecency and sentenced to four years' imprisonment. Upon his release, he moved to northern Canada. He was working as a mechanic in Pine Point, Northwest Territories, in 1965 when he was picked up by police for questioning in connection with a case of suspected arson. Although he was found not to have had any involvement in the fire, Klippert voluntarily admitted to having had recent consensual homosexual relations with four different adult men. He was subsequently arrested and charged with four counts of "gross indecency".

A court-ordered psychiatrist assessed Klippert as "incurably homosexual", and Klippert was sentenced to "preventive detention" (that is, indefinitely) as a dangerous sexual offender. Klippert appealed to the Court of Appeal for the Northwest Territories; his appeal was dismissed. He then appealed to the Supreme Court of Canada; his appeal was dismissed on November 7, 1967, in a controversial 3–2 decision.

The day after Klippert's conviction was upheld, New Democratic Party leader Tommy Douglas invoked Klippert's name in the House of Commons of Canada, stating that "homosexuality is a social and psychiatric problem rather than a criminal one", and asking Prime Minister Lester B. Pearson if he would consider setting up a commission to study the issue, similar to the Wolfenden Committee in Britain which brought in "enlightened and humane recommendations for coping with this problem." The Prime Minister replied that he would be very glad to consider that matter. Douglas followed up with a second question, asking the Minister of Justice, Pierre Trudeau, if this matter was being considered by officials in the Department of Justice. Trudeau replied that "one aspect of this matter is being looked at in the context of another law." Within six weeks, Pierre Trudeau presented the Criminal Law Amendment Act, 1968-69 (Bill C-150 of 1968), an omnibus bill which, among other things, decriminalized private homosexual acts between consenting adults. The law passed, and private homosexual acts between consenting adults were decriminalized in Canada in 1969.

Klippert remained in prison until his release on July 21, 1971. He lived 25 more years before his death from kidney disease in 1996.

In 2016 the government of Justin Trudeau indicated that it planned to recommend a formal posthumous pardon of Klippert's conviction. On November 18, 2020, an expungement order was issued by the Parole Board of Canada.

In 2018, Klippert's life became the topic of the stage play Legislating Love: The Everett Klippert Story, by Calgary playwright Natalie Meisner.

In 2025 the Klippert case was designated a National Historic Event.

== See also ==
- Gay rights in Canada

== Bibliography ==
- Pierre Berton: 1967: The Last Good Year: Toronto: Doubleday Canada: 1997: ISBN 978-0-385-25662-9
- Gary Kinsman: Regulation of Desire: Sexuality in Canada: Montreal: New York: 1987, 1995: ISBN 978-0-920057-81-0, 155164 0406
