= Thomas Waugh =

Canadian academic and film critic

- Born: April 24, 1948 (age 78); London, Ontario, Canada
- Education: University of Western Ontario (BA); Columbia University (MFA, PhD)
- Occupations: Academic; author; critic; programmer; activist
- Writing career
- Period: 1970s–present
- Notable works: Show Us Life: Towards a History and Aesthetics of the Committed Documentary; Hard to Imagine: Gay Male Eroticism in Photography and Film from Their Beginnings to Stonewall; The Romance of Transgression in Canada: Queering Sexualities, Nations, Cinemas; Conscience of Cinema: The Work of Joris Ivens, 1912-1989

Thomas Waugh is a Canadian critic, lecturer, author, actor, and activist, best known for his work on documentary film and eroticism in the history of LGBT cinema and art. A professor emeritus at Concordia University, he taught for 41 years in the film studies program of the School of Cinema and held a research chair in documentary film and sexual representation. He was also the director of the Concordia HIV/AIDS Project, 1993–2017, a program providing a platform for research and conversations involving HIV/AIDS in the Montreal area.

== Career ==
A graduate of the University of Western Ontario and Columbia University, Waugh wrote film criticism and history articles for publications such as Jump Cut and The Body Politic before publishing his first book, Show Us Life: Towards a History and Aesthetics of the Committed Documentary, in 1984.

His 1996 book, Hard to Imagine: Gay Male Eroticism in Photography and Film from Their Beginnings to Stonewall, took 13 years to research and write. Its release was delayed by eight months due to difficulty finding a printer willing to handle the book's sexually explicit homoerotic imagery.

He received nominations for Lambda Literary Awards in the Visual Arts category at the 15th Lambda Literary Awards in 2003 for Out/Lines: Underground Gay Graphics From Before Stonewall and at the 17th Lambda Literary Awards in 2005 for Lust Unearthed: Vintage Gay Graphics from the DuBek Collection. He is also the recipient of the Katherine Singer Kovács Society for Cinema and Media Studies Book Award for The Conscience of Cinema: The Work of Joris Ivens, 1912-1989.

Waugh also has served on the board of Cinema Politica, helped expand the Quebec Gay Archives, and is co-editor with Matthew Hays of the Queer Film Classics series of monographs on LGBTQ-related films published by Arsenal Pulp Press. In 2013, Waugh, Ryan Conrad, and Cinema Politica raised funds on Indiegogo to produce and distribute a documentary film about the Russian LGBT organization Children-404.

In 2015, Waugh and filmmaker Kim Simard launched the Queer Media Database Canada-Québec, an online project to collect information about Canadian LGBT media and its creators.

== Works ==
- Who Are We?, A Very Natural Thing, The Naked Civil Servant: Films By Gays For Gays (1977)
- Show Us Life: Towards a History and Aesthetics of the Committed Documentary (1984)
- Men's Pornography: Gay vs. Straight (1985)
- Hard to Imagine: Gay Male Eroticism in Photography and Film from Their Beginnings to Stonewall (1996)
- The Fruit Machine: Twenty Years of Writings on Queer Cinema (2000)
- Out/Lines: Underground Gay Graphics From Before Stonewall (2002)
- Lust Unearthed: Vintage Gay Graphics from the DuBek Collection (2004)
- The Romance of Transgression in Canada: Queering Sexualities, Nations, Cinemas (2006)
- Gay Art: A Historic Collection (2006)
- Comin' At Ya! The Homoerotic 3-D Photographs of Denny Denfield (2007, with David L. Chapman)
- Montreal Main (2010, with Jason Garrison)
- Challenge for Change: Activist Documentary at the National Film Board of Canada (2010, with Michael Baker and Ezra Winton)
- The Right to Play Oneself: Looking Back on Documentary Film (2011)
- The Perils of Pedagogy: The Works of John Greyson (2013, with Brenda Longfellow and Scott MacKenzie)
- The Conscience of Cinema: The Works of Joris Ivens, 1912-1989 (2016)
- I Confess! Constructing the Sexual Self In the Internet Age (2019, edited with Brandon Arroyo)
