= 1994 Edmonton municipal by-election =

Municipal election in Alberta, Canada

On January 20, 1994, residents of Edmonton's Ward 3 elected an alderman to replace Judy Bethel, who had resigned after being elected to the House of Commons of Canada. All candidates ran as independents.

== Results ==
(bold indicates elected, italics indicate incumbent)

Candidate	Votes	%
**Sherry McKibben**	**2,098**	**20.07%**
Robert Noce	1,660	15.88%
Bill Maxim	1,563	14.95%
Riaz Choudhry	1,194	11.42%
Joe Filewych	1,091	10.44%
Terence Bachor	717	6.86%
Margaret Stumbourg	511	4.89%
Len McEwan	398	3.81%
Terry Newborn	329	3.15%
Mike Roppo	216	2.07%
Marno Sekora	148	1.42%
Paul Earley	120	1.15%
Shawn Foran	94	0.90%
Daryl Robb	72	0.69%
Thomas Tomilson	70	0.67%
Ernie Hagen	60	0.57%
Charles Montalbetti	60	0.57%
David McLean	54	0.52%
