= Quebec Gay Archives =

Canadian nonprofit organization

The Quebec Gay Archives (French: Archives gaies du Québec or AGQ) is a nonprofit organisation dedicated to documenting the history of LGBTQ2S+ communities in the Canadian province of Quebec.

The Archives was founded in 1983 by university students Jacques Prince and Ross Higgins, who had met at Montreal's gay and lesbian bookstore, Librairie L'Androgyne. They knew of the Canadian Lesbian and Gay Archives (now the ArQuives) in Toronto and wanted to preserve the history of the gay and lesbian community of Quebec. The collection was initially housed in Higgins's apartment; in 1993, it moved to a building shared with other LGBT organisations, and in 2013 to larger premises in rue Atateken (previously named rue Amherst).

The AGQ maintains collections of periodicals, books, audio-visual material, posters, and artworks. Its archival collections include the works of Montreal "beefcake" photographer Alan B. Stone as well as the papers of journalist Bernard Courte, the Quebec association of gay and lesbian rights (French: l'Association pour les droits des gais et lesbiennes du Québec or ADGLQ), LGBT and AIDS activists Douglas Buckley-Couvrette and Ken Morrison, feminist academic Viviane Namaste, writer Marcel F. Raymond, model Normand Chambert, film critic and historian Thomas Waugh, and curator Miriam Ginestier.

== See also ==
- LGBTQ rights in Canada
- Timeline of LGBTQ history
