= Sherry McKibben =

Canadian politician

- Photo of Sherry McKibben

Edmonton City Councillor Ward 4
- In office 1994–1995
- Preceded by: Judy Bethel
- Succeeded by: Brian Mason, Robert Noce

Personal details
- Born: 1944
- Died: January 29, 2014 (aged 69–70) Mexico
- Spouse: Karen Matthews
- Children: 3
- Education: University of British Columbia, London School of Economics and Political Science
- Occupation: Politician, social worker, activist

Sherry McKibben (M.Phil, MSW, RSW) (1944–2014) was an Edmonton alderman (city councillor) who was elected in the 1994 by-election to replace Ward 4 alderman Judy Bethel, who was elected to the House of Commons and resigned her seat on council.

She represented Ward 4 in 1994 and 1995 and ran in Ward 3 in the 1995 municipal election but was defeated, coming third.

McKibben was an openly lesbian candidate and became the first openly lesbian alderman in Edmonton’s history and the city's second openly gay alderman after Michael Phair, who was Edmonton and Alberta's first openly gay alderman. According to the conservative news magazine, The Alberta Report, upon her election she became "the city's second homosexual and fifth socialist alderman."

== Education ==
Sherry McKibben studied at the University of British Columbia and received her Master of Social Work in 1973. In 1994, she received a Masters of Philosophy in Social Administration from the London School of Economics and Political Science. Her thesis was titled Patterns of foster care in Saskatchewan: The impact on the family connections and the early adult lives of careleavers.

== Edmonton City Council ==
=== 1994 By-Election ===
When Ward 3 alderman Judy Bethel was elected to the House of Commons in 1993, a by-election to replace her was called in January 1994. Eighteen candidates ran and Sherry McKibben won with a total of 2 098 votes or 20.07% of the vote share. She defeated second-place candidate Robert Noce by a mere 438 votes. She represented the ward from January 1994 until the October 1995 election.

While on council, McKibben sat on various committees including the Safer Cities Initiative Advisory Committee (now REACH Edmonton Council for Safe Communities), the Utilities and Public Works Committee, and was vice-chair of the Community Services Committee.

=== 1995 General Election ===
McKibben decided to run in Ward 3 and came third, losing to Brian Mason and Robert Noce, whom she had defeated in 1994, who were elected to the two available positions. She received a total of 8 471 votes or 12.76% of the votes cast.

== Provincial Politics ==
McKibben ran for the New Democratic Party of Alberta in two different provincial elections, and also served as the party president and Chief of Staff for the NDP Caucus from 2006 to 2007.

=== 1997 Provincial Election ===
In 1997 she was the NDP candidate in Edmonton-Norwood and came second, losing to the Alberta Liberal Party candidate Sue Olsen.

=== 2008 Provincial Election ===
In 2008 she ran again, this time in the riding of Edmonton-Gold Bar, and was defeated by Liberal Hugh MacDonald, coming third behind the Progressive Conservative candidate David Dorward.

== Life Outside of Politics ==
McKibben was a long time social worker and advocate in British Columbia and Alberta, and worked in various social work positions in both Vancouver and Edmonton between 1966 and 1974. She worked for the BC Ministry of Human Services in Vancouver between 1974 and 1978.

She served as the health coordinator at Edmonton’s Boyle McCauley Health Centre from 1987 to 1994, and shortly after her electoral defeat in 1995 she became the executive director of the Norwood Community Services Centre from 1996 to 1998. From 1998 to 2006, McKibben was the executive director of the HIV Network of Edmonton Society.

=== Volunteerism ===
She also volunteered at the Pride Centre of Edmonton and was interested especially in LGBTQ2+ seniors. At the time of her death, McKibben was working with her former city council colleague, Michael Phair, on developing programming for LGBTQ2+ seniors in Edmonton.

As part of her commitment to helping people with HIV/AIDS, she travelled to Suriname and Ghana.

She also was a board member of the Health Sciences Association of Alberta.

Additionally, McKibben was part of the non-partisan organization Public Interest Alberta's Democracy Taskforce from 2010 to 2011, which studied the Albertan political landscape and "the development of specific proposals for campaign and party finance reform, and a ten-point proposal in the area of gender and democracy."

She was also a contributor to the Boyle McCauley News from 2010 through 2014 with a column called "Catch 66: the delights, dilemmas and difficulties of aging."

=== Muttart Foundation Fellowship and Book ===
McKibben was a Muttart Foundation Fellow in 2001 and published her book entitled Daunting Tasks; Dedicated People – Stories in the Management of Change in HIV/AIDS Organizations. In the book she discussed how organizations that provide services for people with HIV/AIDS have and could manage changes in the nature of their programming to help their clients.

== Awards ==
McKibben received numerous awards over her career, including the Alberta Centennial Medal in 2005 and the Alberta College of Social Workers' John Hutton Memorial Award for Social Action/Policy in both 1994 and 2014.

== Personal life ==
McKibben was married to Karen Matthews and had two daughters, Rhianna and Rowan Flaherty.

Sherry and her first husband Bruce Morrison married in the spring of 1965. In October 1965 their daughter was born. They relinquished their daughter as soon as she was born to the foster care / adoption system. The baby was adopted and given the name Kathleen Thompson. Kathleen and Sherry met in 1999 as adults (Government of Alberta Vital Statistics Office, 1965).

== Death ==
McKibben died suddenly in Mexico on January 30, 2014, while on vacation with her wife.

In a press release on January 31, 2014, then-NDP leader Brian Mason (a former Edmonton city councillor himself) thanked her for her service to the people of Edmonton and wrote:

Sherry was a strong and compassionate woman whose commitment to people was visible throughout her career. During our work together representing Ward 3 on Edmonton City Council, I was deeply impressed by Sherry's intelligence and work ethic.

Sherry made an important contribution to Alberta's New Democrats. She served as the president of the party, represented the party as a candidate in two provincial elections and worked as Chief of Staff for the NDP caucus.
