= A Vigil for Joe Rose =

Doctoral short story collection

- First edition
- Author: Michael Whatling
- Language: English
- Subject: Being gay and out in high school
- Genre: Short Stories
- Publisher: iUniverse
- Publication date: October 2009
- Publication place: Canada
- Pages: 216
- ISBN: 9781440178559

A Vigil for Joe Rose is a collection of short stories by Michael Whatling about the experience of being out in high school. It is based on Whatling's doctoral research in education at McGill University in Montreal, Quebec, Canada. Joe Rose was a Montreal gay activist who was attacked and murdered in 1989 by assailants who jeered at him and shouted, "Faggot," for having pink hair.

In an interview, Whatling stated that what was telling about his research for this book was that when he contacted many high schools in order to interview students, he was told, "We don't know any gay students."

The stories are:

- Elton John, Uncle David, and Me: Evan's Story—Part I
- The Nail That Sticks Up Gets Hammered Down: Alex's Blog
- Who Do You Think You Are?: Pages from Joe Rose's Notebook
- The Holy Ghost: Eric's Story
- Advice to Teachers: Pages from Joe Rose's Notebook
- A Lesson on Being Inseparable: Geoff's Story
- Episodes in Fear: Matthew's Story
- Advice to Administrators: Pages from Joe Rose's Notebook
- E-mails to My Brother: Christopher's Story
- If My School Asked Me Not to Be Out: Pages from Joe Rose's Notebook
- "In case you haven't noticed, I'm gay. Pass the salt.": Tristan's Story
- Rebel...Just Because: Evan's Story—Part II
- Open Letter to Gay Students: Pages from Joe Rose's Notebook

== Critical reception ==
A Vigil for Joe Rose was chosen by the American Library Association for inclusion in their 2010 Rainbow Book List. It was reviewed in the Journal of LGBT Youth, which described the book as an "engaging collection," and, having been based on interviews with students who were gay and out in their high schools at the time, made the work both "relevant and interesting."

Other critics found Whatling did "a superb job of shining the spotlight on the thinking of sixteen to eighteen-year-olds, who happen to be gay, out, and attending high school," although they did note a lack of "any real conflict" in some of the stories.

A review on the PFLAG website called it "an important work." It has become a popular educational tool for gay-straight alliances across Canada.

In 2009, "The Last Coming Out Story," the novella included in A Vigil for Joe Rose, made the "Editor's Desk" on the HarperCollins Authonomy website. HarperCollins editors called it "a nice balance of humor and seriousness...and the delicate issues are handled with a sense of realism."
