= Pride Week 1973 =

LGBT rights event in Canada

Pride Week 1973 was a national LGBT rights event in Canada, which was held in August 1973. The event, which took place from August 19 to 26, was marked by LGBT-themed programming in several Canadian cities, including Vancouver, Toronto, Ottawa, Montreal, Saskatoon and Winnipeg. Programming included an art festival, a dance, picnic, a screening of a documentary and a rally for gay rights that occurred in all the participating cities.

The event was, however, a one-off event which did not directly result in the creation of an annual LGBT pride festival in any of the participating cities. Although all do now have annual pride festivals, each of those was created later on as a local initiative rather than evolving directly out of the 1973 program.

In Vancouver over 300 people attended the arts festival and dance of the first day of the week, and many of them attended the rally on the steps of the courthouse on the following day. The initial events are also said to have been attended by straight onlookers.

The rally on August 25 marked the protest aspect of the otherwise celebratory. The aim of the protest was to “hear something of the growth of the gay movement and to declare their determination to continue the struggle.” In general the week combined elements of commemoration, celebration and protest for further change.

The Pride Week of 1973 marks the shift in Vancouver from the homophile movement into the gay liberation movement. The essence of the homophile movement is that of assimilation into the general society as well as the creation of hidden network for gays and lesbians to meet one another and form a community. The gay liberation movement is more active and aims to achieve change through visibility and protest. Pride Week 1973 was clearly a visible event aiming for openness and change, it was also the first one of its kind and is therefore a tangible shift of the mentality of the gay rights movement.

This was the first large-scale event organized for the purpose of celebrating the community and actively pressing for change, thus it was a watershed event in the progression of gay liberation in Vancouver. Other cities, such as Toronto, had previously held similar events. For Vancouver, and others, it was a first.

Pride Week 1973 also marked the emergence of the concept of gay pride and the first Pride Parade like event in Vancouver. The rally was, although not flamboyantly colourful as pride parades are today, a typical parade of the time. It marked visibility and unity on part of the gay community, it celebrated the difference of the members of the community and aimed to incite change. However, it wasn't until 1978 that the pride parade was organized in and of itself.

Due to the collaboration of Toronto, Montreal, Vancouver and the other cities to organize Pride Week together, the event marks the unity, visibility and strength of the movement in Canada. It was a noticeable protest on a country wide basis. Thus this event is significant on a number of different levels, as it represents the shift from the homophile movement into the gay liberation movement, it shows the emergence of the concept of gay pride, and it can also be considered to be the first pride parade in Vancouver.
