= Gross indecency =

Any of various sexual criminal offenses

Gross indecency is a crime in some parts of the English-speaking world, originally used to criminalize sexual activity between men that fell short of sodomy, which required penetration. The term was first used in British law in a statute of the British Parliament in 1885 and was carried forward in other statutes throughout the British Empire. The offence was never actually defined in any of the statutes which used it, which left the scope of the offence to be defined by court decisions.

== History ==
The term gross indecency was first used in the Labouchere Amendment (Section 11 of the Criminal Law Amendment Act 1885), which criminalized sexual acts between men, including those done in private.

Gross indecency statutes consequently spread throughout the British Empire. Canada adopted the term in Section 178 of the Criminal Code in 1892. The term was also used in the Criminal Code (Sections 206 (1906, 1927), 149 (1953–1954), 157 (1970), 161 (1985)) as well as in the Criminal Law Amendment Act (1968–1969, Section 7); however, all statutes that used the term were repealed in 1985 with an amendment to both the Criminal Code and the Canada Evidence Act.

The United Kingdom later used the term in the Sexual Offences Act 1956 and in Section 1(1) of the Indecency with Children Act 1960.

=== Notable cases ===
Oscar Wilde was charged and convicted of gross indecency in 1895.

Alan Turing pleaded guilty to the crime in 1952, the consequences of which led to his alleged suicide in 1954. Turing, who had been convicted of gross indecency for consensual, private homosexual acts, received a posthumous pardon in 2013. In 2017, under the Alan Turing law, all men convicted of gross indecency due to consensual, private sexual acts were pardoned.

Everett George Klippert was the last person in Canada to be arrested, charged, prosecuted, convicted, and imprisoned for gross indecency for homosexuality before the decriminalization of homosexual acts in 1969; the reform was a direct result of the Klippert case. In 1965 Everett George Klippert was interrogated by the police as part of an arson investigation in the Northwest Territories. Klippert was arrested after admitting that he had had sex with other men. When psychiatrists determined that he was unlikely to stop having sex with men, he was declared a dangerous offender and sentenced to life in prison. Maclean's, Canada's popular newsweekly, then printed an article sympathetic to homosexuals. This led to increasing calls to reform Canada's law on homosexuality. Klippert was released in 1971.

== Current legislation ==
=== Australia ===
==== South Australia ====
Gross indecency is an indictable offence in the state of South Australia, with gross indecency requiring the involvement of a person under 16 years of age.

A minor indictable offence, gross indecency carries a maximum term of imprisonment of three years for a first time offence, and five years for a subsequent offence.

=== The Gambia ===
Gross indecency between both males and females is criminalised in the Gambia. Under Section 147(1) of the Criminal Code 1934, gross indecency amongst males is punishable by a maximum sentence of 5 years' imprisonment, and, under Section 147(2) of the Criminal Code 1934, gross indecency amongst females is punishable by a maximum sentence of 5 years' imprisonment.

=== Guyana ===
Under Section 352 of the Criminal Law (Offences) Act 1893, gross indecency amongst men is criminalised, carrying a maximum sentence of life imprisonment. In 2025, five out of six of the political parties running in the general election supported the decriminalisation of homosexuality.

=== Jamaica ===
Gross indecency, between males only, is criminalised in Jamaica. Under article 79 of the Offences Against the Person Act, gross indecency is a misdemeanor and is punishable by a maximum sentence of 2 years' imprisonment, with or without hard labour.

=== Kenya ===
Gross indecency between male persons of any age, in public or private, is a felony punishable by up to five years' imprisonment. Gross indecency is a lesser offence than sodomy, which is punishable by up to 14 years' imprisonment. LGBT rights activists are trying to repeal the law.

=== Kiribati ===
Whilst buggery is criminalised amongst both males and females in Kiribati, gross indecency is only criminalised amongst males. Under Section 155 of the Penal Code 1977, gross indecency amongst males is a felony and is punishable by a maximum sentence of 5 years' imprisonment.

=== Malawi ===
Gross indecency between both males and females is criminalised in Malawi. Under Section 137A of the Penal Code, gross indecency amongst females is punishable by a maximum sentence of 5 years' imprisonment. Under Section 156 of the Penal Code, gross indecency amongst males is punishable by a maximum sentence of 5 years' imprisonment.

=== Malaysia ===
Gross indecency between both males and females is criminalised in Malaysia. Under Section 377D of the Penal Code, gross indecency is punishable by a maximum sentence of 2 years' imprisonment.

=== Nigeria ===
Whilst carnal knowledge against the order of nature is criminalised amongst both males and females in Nigeria, gross indecency is only criminalised amongst males. Under Section 217 of the Criminal Code Act, gross indecency between males is a felony and is punishable by a maximum sentence of 3 years' imprisonment.

=== Papua New Guinea ===
Gross indecency, between males only, is criminalised in Papua New Guinea. Under Section 212 of the Criminal Code 1974, gross indecency is punishable by a maximum sentence of 3 years' imprisonment.

=== Saint Lucia ===
Gross indecency between both males and females is criminalised in Saint Lucia, but only in the case that either they aren't consenting or that the act is in public. Under Section 132 of the Criminal Code, No. 9 of 2004, gross indecency is punishable by a maximum sentence of 10 years' imprisonment on conviction for indictment or 5 years' imprisonment on summary conviction.

=== Saint Vincent and the Grenadines ===
Gross indecency between both males and females is criminalised in Saint Vincent and the Grenadines. Under Section 148 of the Criminal Code, 1990 edition, gross indecency is punishable by a maximum sentence of 5 years' imprisonment.

=== Solomon Islands ===
Gross indecency between both males and females is criminalised in Solomon Islands. Under Section 162 of the Penal Code (Revised Edition 1996), gross indecency is a felony and is punishable by a maximum sentence of 5 years' imprisonment.

=== Sudan ===
Gross indecency between both males and females is criminalised in Sudan. Under Section 151 of the Penal Code 1991, gross indecency is punishable by a maximum sentence of 1 year's imprisonment or a fine.

=== Trinidad and Tobago ===
Gross indecency, between males only, is criminalised in Trinidad and Tobago, with a maximum penalty of two years' imprisonment. It is a lesser sentence than buggery, which carries a maximum penalty of five years' imprisonment. In 2018, the High Court ruled that Section 13, which criminalises buggery, and Section 16, which criminalises serious indecency, of the Sexual Offences Act ("the 1986 Act") were unconstitutional. However, in 2025, the Court of Appeal ordered that it once again be criminalised.

=== United States ===
==== Michigan ====
In the United States, Michigan is the only state that currently has gross indecency statutes. Michigan has three types of gross indecency crimes, all of which are five-year felonies:

- Gross indecency between male persons
- Gross indecency between female persons
- Gross indecency between male and female persons

Gross indecency between male persons was codified first, and the other two were made into laws later. Historically, the definition of gross indecency was unclear, and courts relied on nebulous notions such as the "common sense of society". The vagueness of the term allowed for adults who engaged in consensual sex with no monetary transactions in the privacy of their own homes to be charged with the crime, and men who had sex with men were particularly vulnerable to prosecution. Over time, the definition increasingly narrowed through Michigan Supreme Court decisions, and a 1994 decision officially narrowed it to sex acts that occurred in a public place or that involved a minor, the application of force, or a monetary transaction. Michigan now has separate statutes addressing all four aforementioned acts in statutes regarding indecent exposure, criminal sexual conduct (CSC), and prostitution; however, the gross indecency statutes remain in effect.

The gross indecency statutes have been criticized by LGBT rights activists.

=== Zambia ===
Gross indecency between both males and females is criminalised in Zambia. Under Section 158 of the Penal Code, gross indecency amongst both males and females is punishable by a maximum sentence of 14 years' imprisonment.

== See also ==
- Outraging public decency
- Paragraph 175
- Sodomy law
