= George Herchmer Markland =

Canadian politician

George Herchmer Markland (c. 1790 – May 17, 1862) was a political figure in Upper Canada.

He was born in Kingston around 1790, the son of merchant Thomas Markland, and was educated at Cornwall by John Strachan. During the War of 1812, he served with the Frontenac militia. In 1820, he was appointed to the Legislative Council for the province. In 1822, he became an honorary member of the Executive Council and was made a regular member five years later.

In 1828, Markland became secretary receiver for the corporation that administered the clergy reserves as well as registrar for King's College, later the University of Toronto. He was also involved in the creation of Upper Canada College. In 1833, he became inspector general of public accounts. He resigned in protest, with others on the Executive Council, in 1836. At this time, Markland was considered to be one of the leading figures in the Family Compact, the ruling clique of the province's elite.

In 1838, rumours began to circulate regarding improper conduct by Markland; he was alleged to have had liaisons with several young men. The investigation was dropped after Markland agreed to resign as inspector general. In 1841, there were additional allegations of misappropriation of funds because Markland had used funds from King's College in support of the construction of Upper Canada College; this issue was dropped after John Strachan intervened.

He died at Kingston in 1862.
