= Natalie Meisner =

Canadian playwright and poet

Natalie Meisner is a Canadian playwright, poet, and academic, known for her literary contributions and her role as the fifth Poet Laureate of Calgary. She is currently a professor in English and Creative Writing at Mount Royal University in Calgary, Canada.

== Selected works ==
=== Plays ===
- "Legislating Love: The Everett Klippert Story": This play is inspired by the life of Everett Klippert, a Calgary bus driver whose story played a significant role in the decriminalization of homosexuality.
- "AREA 33": A thought-provoking play exploring themes of intergenerational mistrust and challenges in the fishing industry.
- "Speed Dating for Sperm Donors" (stage play)

=== Books ===
- Meisner, Natalie (1 March 2014). Double Pregnant: Two Lesbians Make a Family. Roseway Publishing, ISBN 978-1552666012.
- Meisner, Natalie (8 April 2019). My Mommy, My Mama, My Brother, and Me: These Are the Things We Found By the Sea. Nimbus Publishing. ISBN 978-1-77108-741-4.
- Meisner, Natalie (17 September 2019). Baddie One Shoe. Frontenac House ISBN 978-1-927823-96-5.
- Meisner, Natalie; Allen, Kevin; Maillie, Tereasa; Mehmel, Jason (15 November 2019). Legislating Love: The Everett Klippert Story (1st ed.). University of Calgary Press. ISBN 978-1773850818.
- Meisner, Natalie (27 April 2020). Speed Dating for Sperm Donors. Playwrights Canada Press. ISBN 978-0369100825.
- Meisner, Natalie (15 April 2023). It Begins in Salt. Frontenac House Ltd. ISBN 978-1-989466-47-6.

== Awards and honours ==
It Begins In Salt was on the Calgary bestseller list and was recently shortlisted for the Gwendolyn MacEwen poetry award.

Two plays by Meisner are shortlisted for the Tom Hendry Awards run by the Playwright's Guild of Canada: "Legislating Love" (shortlisted for the Carol Bolt Award) and "AREA 33" (shortlisted for the Drama Award).

Natalie Meisner was awarded the Carol Bolt Award at the Tom Hendry Awards in 2023 for Legislating Love.
