= Sex Garage =

LGBT nightclub in Montreal, Canada

- Interactive map of Sex Garage
- Location: 494 Rue de la Gauchetière Ouest, Montreal, Canada
- Coordinates: 45°30′9″N 73°33′49″W
- Type: Nightclub
- Event: LGBTQ

Sex Garage was a series of after-hours roving loft/warehouse parties located in Montreal's Old Montreal district that catered to LGBT+ patrons in the late 1980s and early 1990s. The venue is most known for a 1990 police raid that has since been referred to as "Montreal's Stonewall".

== Police raid ==
In the early morning of July 16, 1990, police officers raided the party under the premise that it was illegally selling alcohol, a tactic that professors Jason B. Crawford and Karen Herland stated was frequently used by officers to harass Montreal gay and lesbian businesses during this time period. The police would later assert that they had also been responding to an anonymous noise complaint and that the organizers had requested help, claims that Nicolas Jenkins the event organizer, has stated were absolutely false. Officers were initially unable to find any alcohol and left the premises but returned about 15 minutes later, at which point they forced Sex Garage's 400 patrons to evacuate. Sex Garage's patrons began leaving the venue, only to find a large police presence facing the venue's only exit door. Linda Dawn Hammond stated that there were an estimated 32 to 40 officers and 16 police vehicles, some of which were from a police station outside of the area. Some of the patrons fled upon seeing the police while others watched the officers start to regroup into a battalion formation. Patrons were not allowed to return to Sex Garage to retrieve their possessions or look for friends.

Once in formation the police began to heckle the patrons by shouting homophobic insults and making suggestive gestures, which the patrons responded to by chanting slogans such as "We're here, we're queer, we're proud of it!" At this point the officers began removing or covering their name tags and badge IDs and started trying to steer patrons towards Beaver Hall Hill, where more officers were waiting. It is believed that one partygoer, Bruce Buck, was the first person to be assaulted after he tried to go back into the venue to retrieve his leather jacket. He was severely beaten and arrested for "assaulting a police officer". After this point the officers began beating the other patrons.

During this entire process Photographer Linda Dawn Hammond shot photographs of everything, a process that was somewhat hampered as she was only carrying a camera with a 28 mm wide angle lens, which required her to be in close proximity to take detailed photographs. She stated that the police did not initially stop her from taking photographs, which she believed was done because "the police may have speculated that I could be taken at any time, and I may as well provide THEM with the documentation." However eventually the police began pursuing Hammond, at which point she managed to throw her camera to another patron as they were fleeing the scene.

The following day Hammond's pictures were published in The Gazette and La Presse. Video footage of the raid was also found and released, which showed officers using homophobic and derogatory language while physically assaulting members of the crowd, which has since been used to deem the raid as a targeted assault against Montreal's LGBT community. By the assault's end, eight people were arrested.

== Protests ==
Hours after the raid victims of the assault, along with other citizens of Montreal, held a sit-in at Saint Catherine Street to protest the night's events. The group demanded several things, including a public inquiry and the removal of any charges against the patrons. The protesters disbanded after they were promised that police chief Alain St-Germain would meet them the following day at downtown Station 25. When St-Germain did not appear the following day protesters held a sit-in demonstration, only for about 70 police officers to attack the protesters. Forty-eight protesters were arrested with most assaulted by the police both on the streets and when they were taken into the police station, one of which, was hospitalized after paramedics argued with police to let them attend his injuries.

== Legacy ==
Due to the violence inflicted during the raid and during the resulting protests, the civil rights group Lesbians and Gays Against Violence was formed and several members became part of the Montreal police's minority relations committee. The brutality of the assault against the Sex Garage patrons and protesters is also credited with bringing the Montreal LGBT community together and with alerting other citizens of the unfair treatment of gays and lesbians.

The event led to the creation of Divers/Cité in 1993. Divers/Cité served as the city's primary LGBT pride festival until repositioning itself as a general arts and music festival in 2006 before filing for bankruptcy in 2015.

The yearly Pervers/Cité, an alternative culture event organized as a reaction to Divers/Cité, has named one of their stages the Sex Garage stage after the venue.
