= Hanlan's Point Beach =

Nude gay beach in Toronto, Canada

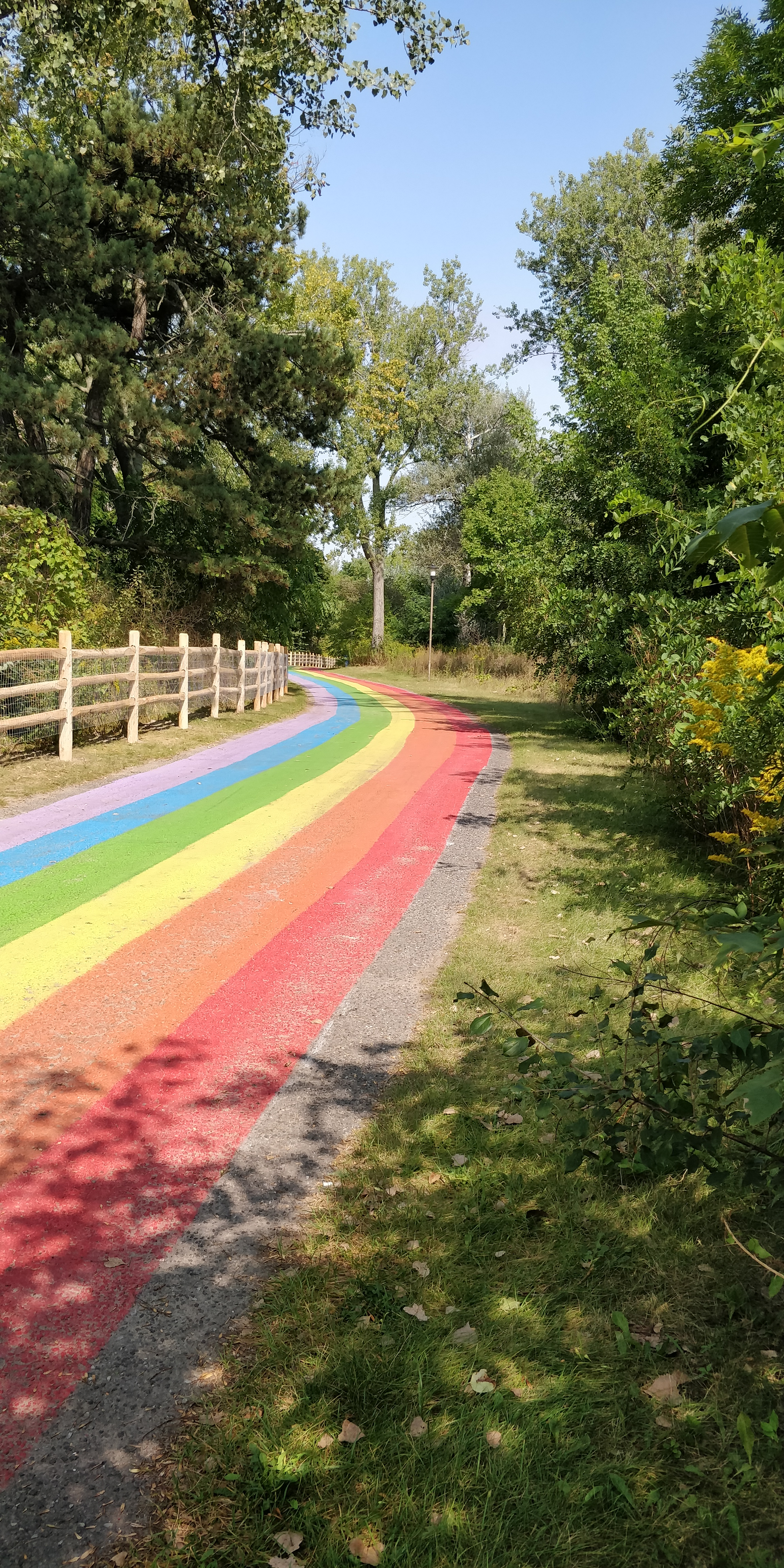
- Rainbow Road, Hanlan's Point Beach
- Interactive map of Hanlan's Point Beach
- Type: Public nude beach
- Location: Toronto, Ontario
- Coordinates: 43°37′11.1″N 79°23′38.4″W
- Established: November 1880
- Operator: Toronto Parks
- Habitats: Freshwater coastal sand dunes
- Designation: Environmentally Significant Area (Toronto); Area of Natural and Scientific Interest (Ontario)
- Website: Hanlan's Point

Hanlan's Point Beach is a nude beach on The Island just offshore from downtown Toronto, Ontario. It stretches for 2 km along the western shoreline of Hanlan's Point, facing the open waters of Lake Ontario. Recognized by the City of Toronto as one of the ten oldest surviving queer spaces in the world, it is also Canada's oldest surviving queer space and the site of the country's first Gay Pride celebration in 1971.

== History ==
=== Early history ===
Hanlan's Point is located on the western tip of the Toronto Islands, a chain of low-lying sandbars that began forming approximately 7,000 years ago as glacial Lake Iroquois receded. These lands are part of the traditional territory of the Mississaugas of the Credit First Nation and other Anishinaabe nations.

The first written European record of the land that would become Hanlan's Point appears in the 1793 diary of Elizabeth Simcoe, wife of Upper Canada's first Lieutenant Governor, John Graves Simcoe. She frequently visited the sandbar peninsula and described it in vivid detail, captivated by its blend of natural meadows, wildflowers, and shifting lake vistas. In August 1793, she wrote:

“I went to my favourite sands; the bay is a mile across... The air on these sands is peculiarly clear and fine. The Indians esteem this place so healthy that they come and stay here when they are ill.”

Simcoe likened the wooded parts of the peninsula to “shrubbery” and the open dunes to the beaches of Weymouth, England. She noted the abundance of wild grapes, lilies, and creeping purple “everlasting peas,” and even documented a nearby Indigenous burial site marked by a raised wooden platform, bow, arrow, and dog-skin. She and the Governor named the western tip as Gibraltar Point, believing the sandbanks could be fortified, a name that would remain in use on maps well into the 20th century.

In 1858, a major storm breached the eastern neck of the peninsula, severing it from the mainland and forming what is now known as Toronto Island. In 1862, Irish immigrant John Hanlan moved his family to the western tip of the island, where he opened a small hotel near the site that would later bear his name. His son, Edward “Ned” Hanlan, trained in the waters around the island and went on to be the World Sculling Champion from 1880 to 1884.

In 1880, the City of Toronto established Island Park on Centre Island as one of its first official public parks and included the Western Sandbar, the predecessor to today's beach. That same year, Ned Hanlan leased additional land north of his father's homestead (around the present-day ferry docks) and constructed a larger hotel along with rudimentary amusements, laying the groundwork for future resort development.

By the 1890s, the name for the point had changed from Gibraltar to Hanlan's. In 1892, Hanlan sold the hotel and surrounding lands to the Toronto Ferry Company. The company expanded the site's entertainment offerings, formalizing Hanlan's Point as one of the city's most popular pleasure grounds. By 1894, the Toronto Island Guide promoted the area as a full-scale resort distinct from the quieter east-end communities like Ward's Island and Island Park.

=== World's First Nude Beach (1894) ===
On 17 July 1894, Toronto City Council passed a by-law authorizing nude sunbathing and swimming "at all times" on a designated portion of the western beach at Hanlan's Point, then part of the Western Sandbar. The designated area measured approximately 200 feet in length by 50 feet deep (~60 m × 15 m), and the City Commissioner was instructed to erect fencing to mark the boundaries. This measure represented a rare proactive legalization of public nudity, predating other known official nude beaches by several decades.

The 1894 by-law was passed in the context of a broader municipal effort to regulate waterfront bathing. Nude bathing had previously been permitted only during night-time hours at two mainland sites under a 1893 by-law, but the Hanlan's designation removed time-of-day restrictions, making it the only location in Toronto where nude sunbathing was legally permitted.

During this period, the Western Sandbar attracted a wide range of recreational users. Newspaper reports from the late 1890s describe the beach as frequented by boys during the day, with working-class men swimming there in the evenings. In 1896, Mrs. Turner, proprietor of Turner's Baths, a nearby semi-private bathhouse, began filing repeated complaints to the City about nude bathers swimming outside the designated area. Council acknowledged the complaints but "refused to prevent bathing outside the baths, regarding the public interests as more important than hers".

1897 marked the completion of major land reclamation works at Hanlan's Point. The Toronto Ferry Company (TFC), which had acquired the land in 1892, opened an amusement park and the first Hanlan's Point Stadium. Between 1901 and 1910, under the management of Lol Solman, the TFC expanded Hanlan's Point into a major summer destination. Attractions included vaudeville shows, athletic contests, whippet races, regimental bands, and other public events. A second, larger stadium was built after the first burned down in 1903, and a third concrete stadium, Maple Leaf Park, opened in 1910 with a seating capacity of 17,000, making it one of the largest in North America at the time.

In 1907, City Council designated the land around the former Herber's Hotel as parkland and renamed it Hanlan Memorial Park in 1909. That park consisted of the area alongside the airport fence, near today's Blockhouse Bay washroom.

A hangar for WWI military flight training was built on the northern tip of the sandbar, facing into the lagoon, in 1915.

=== Decline and Reshaping (1926–1937) ===
Sunnyside Amusement Park opened across the harbour in 1922, drawing traffic away from Hanlan's Point. After the stadium lost its main tenant, the Toronto Maple Leafs baseball team to Maple Leaf Stadium in 1926, Hanlan's Point Amusement Park was acquired by the City of Toronto through their purchase of the Toronto Ferry Company by the Toronto Transit Commission that same year. The gradual removal of rides and attractions marked a turning point in the area's history, as Hanlan's shifted from a bustling entertainment hub to a quieter, less supervised landscape.

Two years later, in 1928, the Hospital for Sick Children closed its Lakeside Home for Little Children at Gibraltar Point. Located near the south end of Hanlan's Point Beach, the home had previously introduced a degree of institutional presence and supervision. Its closure further reduced oversight on the beach during the summer months. In 1929, the Toronto Harbour Commission began planning for an airport at Hanlan's Point.

On 29 July 1930, Toronto City Council passed a new by-law consolidating municipal rules on public bathing. This by-law eliminated all previously designated clothing-optional zones, including the 200-foot stretch of Hanlan's Point Beach where nude sunbathing and swimming had been legal since 1894. The Toronto Daily Star reported:

“The right, by by-law, for a person to bathe in the nude along the [shore of the Canadian National] Exhibition grounds and other sections of the lake front at certain hours, passed out of existence through the action of city council yesterday.”

Despite the repeal, some limited use of the beach by nude bathers and gay men likely continued during this period.

In 1937, the City of Toronto undertook major alterations to the northern end of Hanlan's Point. The lagoon that separated the Western Sandbar from the main Island was filled in to construct the Toronto Island Airport. This project also involved the removal of 37 cottages located north of Turner's Baths, transforming the site into a more open, windswept space with fewer sightlines and less residential oversight.

Together, these changes reshaped Hanlan's Point from a busy recreational node into a quieter and more secluded environment, laying the groundwork for its reemergence in the mid-20th century as a space associated with queer socializing and informal nude recreation.

=== 1937–1960s ===
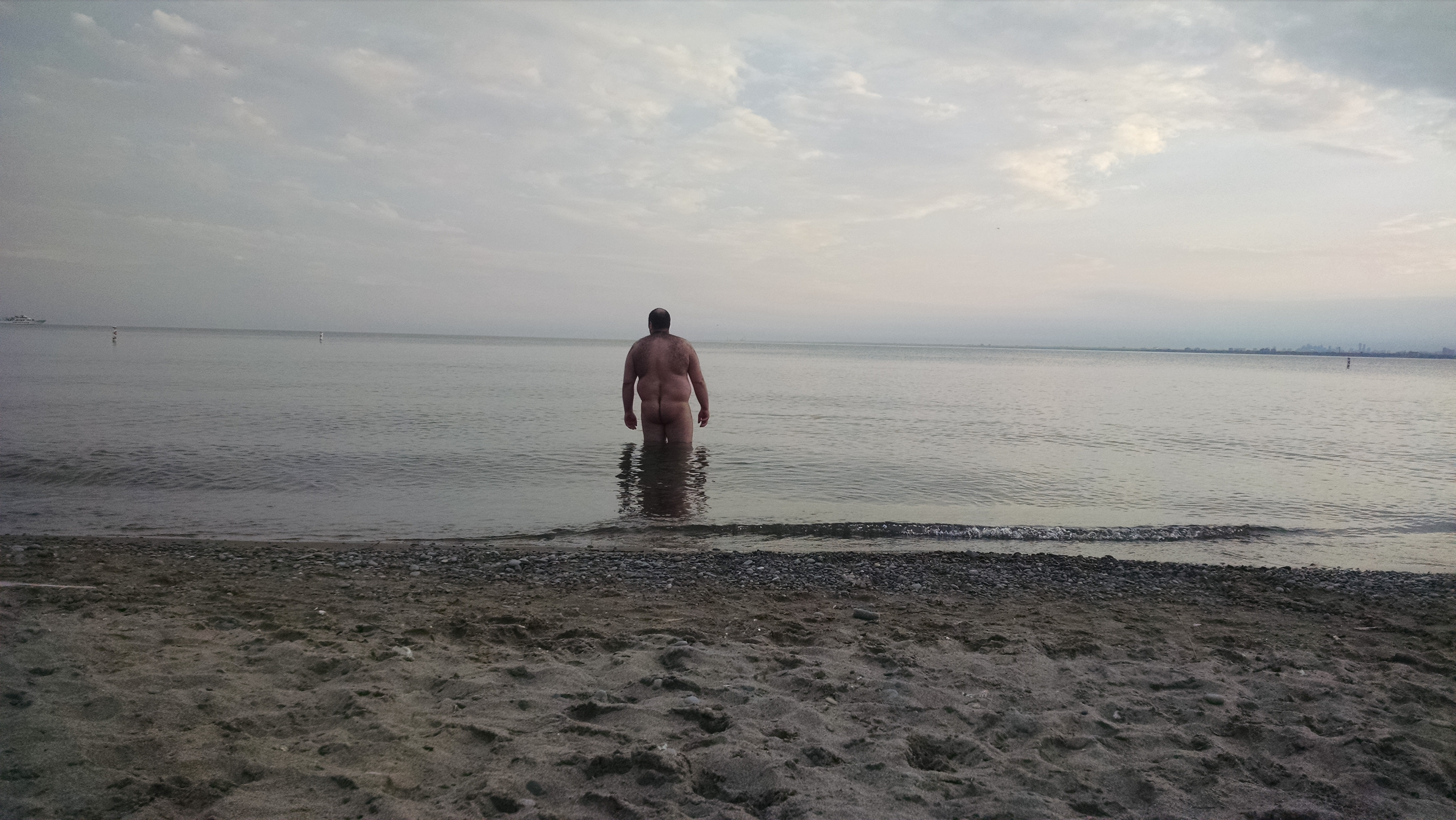
A naturist walking into the water at Hanlan's Point Beach

With the Lakeside Home for Children abandoned in the early 1930s and the vegetation growing alongside the new airport, two nodes at the far north and far south end of the beach emerged as places of queer refuge.

By the 1940s, the beach was being heavily frequented by gays and lesbians. As Carol Ritchie-MacKintosh attests to in Forbidden Love: The Unashamed Stories of Lesbian Lives:

“In the late forties, when I was much, much younger, I met a lot of very nice gay people, both men and women. We took the boat - and the island boat at that time went around the islands and ended up at Hanlan’s Point - and we would arrive… very posh, very beautiful. The beautiful people on the beach. We used to all meet at a place called the Candlelight Cafe. Everybody met there on a Sunday. We wore whites and yachting caps, and we had large picnic baskets with all sorts of stuff in them. Smoked oysters, you name it, we had them all… Wine, blankets, and we’d head for Hanlan’s Point, which was the gay section of the beach.”

The dance hall near the ferry docks, a remnant of the amusement park era, remained in use throughout the Second World War but was shuttered in 1949 after it became a site of gang activity.

The parks department destroyed part of the natural dune system in 1955, which had been regenerating since the construction of the airport in 1937. This had the effect of opening up sightlines, particularly to the middle section. One local remarked, "it's the first time in 25 years that I've been able to see the beach and the lake", underscoring just how private the beach had been in previous years. In 1956, the Toronto Islands were handed over to the Metropolitan Parks Department under the authority of Commissioner Tommy Thompson. Thompson launched a $20-million park development program for the islands that included the demolition of all existing homes and legacy amenities at Hanlan's Point.

George Hislop, one of Canada's foremost gay rights activists, met his partner at Hanlan's, which he described as a "gay beach" in 1958.

In the spring of 1962, the dance hall at Hanlan's Point was demolished, along with the houses, marking a final end to the era of amusements and attractions that began in the 1880s.

Between 1962 and 1966, tennis courts, changing booths, and a children's wading pool were installed near the middle of the beach. The Hanlan's Pavilion was built nearby, closer to Lakeshore Avenue, and contained a concession stand and washrooms. The architect, Irving Grossman, used rustic brick to blend the structure into its surroundings and designed the shelter roof out of precast concrete columns and ribs to evoke a tree-like form. At the far south end of the beach, another washroom building and children's wading pool were added at Gibraltar Point.

In January 1968, the Toronto Harbour Commission released their A Bold Concept plan alongside Metro Toronto's Waterfront Plan for the Metropolitan Planning Area. The centrepiece to this plan was Harbour City, a residential neighbourhood lined with canals, developed over a proposed infill of the harbour and Hanlan's Point. Designed by Eberhard Zeidler, the plan was endorsed by the City and Metro Councils in the fall of 1968. The provincial government announced a refined plan in May 1970, supported by urbanists like Jane Jacobs. Ultimately, Hanlan's was spared destruction by the election of Bill Davis, who cancelled the megaproject in December 1971.

=== Hanlan's Gay Picnic: Canada's First Pride (1971) ===
The first "Gay Day Picnic" in Toronto was held at Hanlan's Point Beach on Sunday, August 1, 1971, with the goal of raising funds to send two activists to Ottawa for the march marking the second anniversary of the decriminalization of homosexuality.

Despite its decades-long popularity among gays and lesbians, the beach remained out of sight and out of and mind to most Torontonians. In 1974, a journalists described the beach and picnic grounds at Hanlan's Point as "relatively deserted" and in a letter to the editor, a local resident complained they found no facilities or attractions after making the trek there.

=== Police harassment ===
In August 1975, The Globe and Mail reported that 62 people (59 of whom were men and likely gay or bisexual) were charged with indecent exposure at Hanlan's Point Beach amid increased police enforcement. The article described the beach as a “trouble spot” and quoted the head of the Toronto Island Residents Association, who claimed to have heard of “effigy parties” where nude men sculpted a model of a woman in the sand and stared at it. A city official remarked that “the majority use the section close to the airport, so they don’t bother too many people,” highlighting the quiet segregation of queer beachgoers. The crackdown marked a turning point, ending a period of relative tolerance and beginning a new era of targeted policing against gay men in the space.

The sudden change in policy occurred around the time when the lawns around Hanlan's Point hosted the Boy Scout's 1st Great Toronto Region (GTR) Jamboree. This was the first major event hosted at Hanlan's and one of only two prior to 2014. An additional reason for the crackdown may be the islanders, who despite living 4 km away, regularly complained about nudity at the beach, including the head of the residents association who complained in 1974 that Hanlan's Point Beach was "tacitly being surrendered to a small minority".

One of the men arrested in 1975 remarked in court that public nudity had been allowed at the beach for years. The following year, Dennis Colby, one of the first gay school board trustees, was arrested and accused the police officer of threatening to punch him in the face.

=== City council ===
In 1983, the City paved and realigned Lakeshore Avenue. This new road quickly supplanted Beach Road as the main artery on the west side of the island, enlarging the buffer between the beach and island visitors and further isolating the space.

Hanlan's Point Beach has been an important gathering place for Toronto's gay community since at least the 1950s. Canada's first Gay Pride celebration was held on the beach on August 1, 1971, to unite the community and encourage participation in the We Demand Rally held later that month in Ottawa. The Gay Day Picnic was organized by the Community Homophile Association of Toronto, the University of Toronto Homophile Association, and Toronto Gay Action.

Hanlan's Point became a location for nude sunbathing. In 1999, Toronto City Council approved a one-year pilot project for a nude beach at Hanlan's Point following a proposal by the gay naturist organization TNT!MEN (Totally Naked Toronto Men Enjoying Nudity) and Councillor Kyle Rae. In 2000, the council extended the project for another two years. Finally in 2002, the clothing-optional beach was made permanent.

The Toronto City Council decision was met with strong opposition from conservative councillors such as Giorgio Mammoliti. It was also an infrequent target of police crackdowns for nude sunbathing. Its official status has resulted in a distinct increase in ferry traffic, and it appears to be a profitable component of public- and private-sector advertising campaigns, since it draws visitors to Toronto. Police and park officials now work in partnership with the beachgoers to maintain the friendly atmosphere. Some nudists prior to a 2023 expansion of the clothing optional area advocated to make the clothing optional side of Hanlan's Point Beach a nude beach due to what they see as an excessive number of clothed people on the clothing optional side of the beach.

In 2023, a plan was revealed by Toronto City Council for the island that would have seen the erection of a concert and festival venue right next to Hanlan's possibly eliminating the clothing optional beach. After a public opposition campaign against the plan dubbed "Friends of Hanlan's" the city dropped the idea and proceeded to work with Friends of Hanlan's to improve the beach. In 2023, the clothing optional section was expanded to the entire beach. On June 15, 2023, City Council passed with unanimous support a motion co-sponsored by Councillor Ausma Malik and Deputy Mayor Jennifer McKelvie titled “MM7.15: Critical Measures to Restore Ecology and Preserve the History of Hanlan’s Point Beach and Surrounding Area.” The motion called for major improvements to the beach such as a brand new cultural marker and signage that will inform visitors about the beach's prominent place in LGBTQ history and a giant Pride flagpole that will be permanently installed at the south end, which have yet to be implemented, rewilding and replanting in huge sections of the beach's lawn area to combat erosion, proper fencing and pathways to be constructed to keep human traffic under control and allow the diminished natural areas a chance to recover, replacing the massively eroded sand coverage along the 400-meter southern stretch of the beach where Canada's first Pride gathering took place, and most notably making the entire Hanlan's Point Beach, not just a section, designated clothing-optional.

=== Erosion ===
In 2026, erosion of the beach reached a critical mass, with much of the beach virtually gone and only small areas of beach remaining accessible. City council has proposed a plan to address the erosion and restore the beach, although work has not yet commenced.

== Background ==
Hanlan's Point Beach can be reached most directly by taking the Hanlan's Point ferry at the foot of Bay Street at Queens Quay. Aside from the cost of the ferry there is no admission fee.

It is the second officially recognized clothing-optional beach in Canada and the only one created by a municipal bylaw. Canada's only other official clothing-optional beach is Wreck Beach in Vancouver, British Columbia.

Despite its proximity to Toronto Harbour, the beach can boast extremely good water quality since it faces southwest and away from the mainland. Water quality is monitored daily (on weekdays) during the summer and meets a Blue Flag standard set by the Foundation for Environmental Education.

== See also ==
- We Demand Rally
- List of social nudity places in North America
- Federation of Canadian Naturists
