= Tom Warner (activist) =

Canadian writer and gay rights activist

Tom Warner (born 1952) is an author, gay rights activist, and former Ontario Human Rights Commissioner. He was born in Saskatchewan and lives in Toronto, Ontario.

He was one of the founding members of Gay Students' Alliance at the University of Saskatchewan and of the Zodiac Friendship Society in Saskatoon. In Toronto, he helped found the Gay Alliance Toward Equality in 1973, later becoming its president, and has also been involved with the Right to Privacy Committee, The Body Politic, and the Committee to Defend John Damien. From 1993 to 1996 he served as an Ontario Human Rights Commissioner.

== Honours and awards ==
He was inducted into The ArQuives' National Portrait Collection in 2002.

== Books ==
- Never Going Back: A History of Queer Activism in Canada. University of Toronto Press, 2002. ISBN 978-0-8020-3608-7.
