= Parade: Queer Acts of Love and Resistance =

- Directed by: Noam Gonick
- Written by: Noam Gonick
- Produced by: Justine Pimlott
- Cinematography: Mrinal Desai
- Edited by: Ricardo Acosta
- Music by: Ken Myhr
- Production company: National Film Board of Canada
- Release date: April 24, 2025 (Hot Docs)
- Running time: 97 minutes
- Country: Canada
- Language: English

Parade: Queer Acts of Love and Resistance is a 2025 Canadian documentary film, directed by Noam Gonick. The film profiles the history of LGBTQ activism and mobilization in Canada, including historic milestones such as the We Demand Rally, the launch of The Body Politic, the protest marches that followed the Sex Garage and Operation Soap raids, Svend Robinson coming out as Canada's first openly gay Member of Parliament, and the rise of two-spirit identity among Indigenous Canadian LGBTQ people.

Key figures appearing in the film include Robinson, Tim McCaskell, Alexander Chapman, Richard Fung, John Greyson, Jearld Moldenhauer, Connie Merasty, Rinaldo Walcott, Chris Bearchell and Susan G. Cole, as well as Michelle Ross in archival footage.

== Production ==
Gonick and producer Justine Pimlott noted that one of the main challenges in making the film was that even as LGBTQ communities have become more visible and accepted in the contemporary world, much of the historical documentation needed to cover LGBTQ history remains in private personal collections rather than publicly accessible archives. According to Pimlott, "The archives become the new thing in the closet, instead of the people". In an essay for CBC Arts, Gonick also expanded on how he decided which stories to include in his film and which to omit, noting that some possible stories didn't have much visual material to support them while others, such as the role of early gay activist Jim Egan, have already been well-covered by other films.

Archival research for the film was provided by Nancy Marcotte, Tanya Fleet, and Rebecka Sheffield.

The film's title is a dual allusion to both the cultural importance of public marches and parades in LGBTQ history, and to Jean Cocteau's 1917 ballet Parade.

== Distribution ==
The film premiered as the opening film of the 2025 Hot Docs Canadian International Documentary Festival.

== Awards ==
The film won the Audience Award for documentary features at the 2025 Inside Out Film and Video Festival.

Ricardo Acosta received a Canadian Screen Award nomination for Best Editing in a Documentary at the 14th Canadian Screen Awards in 2026.
