= David Rayside =

Canadian political scientist

David Rayside FRSC
- Born: David Morton Rayside; 1947 (age 78–79); Montreal, Quebec, Canada
- Partner: Gerald Hunt

Academic background
- Education: Carleton University; University of Michigan
- Thesis: Linguistic Divisions in the Social Christian Party of Belgium and the Liberal Parties of Canada and Quebec (1976)
- Doctoral advisor: Robert D. Putnam

Academic work
- Discipline: Political science
- Institutions: University College, Toronto
- Website: davidrayside.ca

David Morton Rayside FRSC (born 1947) is a Canadian academic and activist. He was a professor of political science at the University of Toronto until his retirement in 2013, and was the founding director of the university's Mark S. Bonham Centre for Sexual Diversity Studies from 2004 to 2008.

Rayside joined the University of Toronto in 1974, and for forty years taught and wrote on the politics of sexual diversity, gender, and religion. He was a member of the Right to Privacy Committee, a committee formed in response to police raids on gay bathhouses, The Body Politic, one of Canada's first and most influential LGBT magazines, the Citizens' Independent Review of Police Activities, and the campaign to add sexual orientation to the Ontario Human Rights Code. He was also a cofounder of the Canadian Lesbian and Gay Studies Association, and of the Positive Space Campaign at the University of Toronto.

He has served on the boards of the Canadian Political Science Association and the American Political Science Association, and in both organizations, he worked on committees promoting equity in academic life. In 2014 he was elected a fellow of the Royal Society of Canada. In 2019, he was inducted into the National Portrait Collection of The ArQuives: Canada's LGBTQ2+ Archives.

Between 2017 and 2025, he produced a series of illustrated essays focused on the history of a small eastern Ontario community in Glengarry County. Included in these is a biography of Edith Rayside, a great aunt who distinguished herself as a leader of Canadian military nurses in the First World War. Other essays use stories about South Lancaster as vehicles for exploring larger themes in Canadian social and political history. This writing is available at www.davidrayside.ca

== Publications ==
- A Small Town in Modern Times: Alexandria, Ontario (ISBN 0773508260), 1991
- On the Fringe: Gays and Lesbians in Politics (ISBN 0801483743), 1998
- Equity, Diversity, and Canadian Labour, ed. Gerald Hunt and David Rayside (ISBN 0802086349), 2007
- Queer Inclusions, Continental Divisions: Public Recognition of Sexual Diversity in Canada and the United States (ISBN 0802086292), 2008
- Faith, Politics, and Sexual Diversity in Canada and the United States, ed. David Rayside and Clyde Wilcox (ISBN 978-0-7748-2009-7), 2011
- Conservatism in Canada, ed. James Farney and David Rayside (ISBN 9781442614567), 2013
- Religion and Canadian Party Politics, by David Rayside, Jerald Sabin, and Paul E. Thomas (ISBN 978-0-7748-3558-9), 2017
- "Early Advocacy for the Public Recognition of Sexual Diversity," in The Oxford Handbook of Global LGBT and Sexual Diversity Politics, ed. Michael Bosia, Sandra McEvoy, and Momin Rahman (ISBN 9780190673741) 2020.
- "Parenting Rights in North America," in Global Encyclopedia of LGBT Politics and Policy, ed. Donald Haider-Markel ISBN 9780190677930, 2021
- "Muslims and Sexual Diversity in North America," in Oxford Research Encyclopedia of Religion, 2021 doi:10.1093/acrefore/9780199340378.013.869
- Three original essays in Queer/Muslim/Canadian, ed. Momin Rahman and Maryam Khan, 2024
- "Edith Catherine Rayside," Dictionary of Canadian Biography, vol. 17 (1940-1950), 2023
