= Walta Borawski =

American poet (1947–1994)

- Born: October 15, 1947; Patchogue, New York, U.S.
- Died: February 9, 1994 (aged 46); Cambridge, Massachusetts, U.S.
- Education: State University of New York
- Occupation: Poet
- Partner: Michael Bronski (1975–1994)

Walta Borawski (October 15, 1947 – February 9, 1994) was an American poet.

== Early life ==
Walta Borawski was born on October 15, 1947, in Patchogue, New York, where he attended high school. His poem "Cheers, Cheers for Old Cha Cha Ass" recounts the pain of school homophobia. Borawski graduated from State University of New York.

== Career ==
After college, he became the first arts editor of the Poughkeepsie Journal. He moved to Boston in 1975.

He published two collections of poems: Sexually Dangerous Poet and Lingering in a Silk Shirt. In 2022, Rebel Satori Press published Invisible History: The Collected Poems of Walta Borawski, edited by Philip Clark and Michael Bronski, which includes both published collections along with uncollected work. This volume won the Publishing Triangle's 2023 Thom Gunn Award for Gay Poetry.

His poems "Some of Us Wear Pink Triangles" and "Power of One" are included in The Columbia Anthology of Gay Literature : Readings from Western Antiquity to the Present Day and "Invisible History", "(No title)," "Things Are Still Sudden & Wonderful," "Traveling in the Wrong Century," and "Trying to Write a Love Poem" are included in Persistent Voices : Poetry by Writers Lost to AIDS, edited by David Groff and Philip Clark.

== Personal life ==
Borawski was the partner of Michael Bronski. They met on June 23, 1975, and remained together until Borawski's death on February 9, 1994. Robert Giard photographed the two together in 1987 for his series Particular Voices. They are also featured in the anthology Two Hearts Desire: Gay Couples on their Love, originally published in 1997, and republished in digital format in 2017.

He died on February 9, 1994, of complications from AIDS, at his home in Cambridge, Massachusetts.
