= Right to Privacy Committee =

Canadian organization

The Right to Privacy Committee (RTPC) was a Canadian organization located in Toronto which was one of the city's largest and most active advocacy groups during the 1980s, a time of strained police relations with the gay community. The group focused on the Toronto Police Service's harassment of gays and infringement of privacy rights, and challenged police authority to search gay premises and seize materials. At the time of the 1981 Operation Soap bathhouse raids, RTPC was Canada's largest gay rights group, with a mailing and volunteer list of 1,200 names. People associated with the RTPC include Michael Laking, Brent Hawkes, John Alan Lee, Dennis Findlay, Tom Warner, and George W. Smith.

== History ==
On December 9, 1978, police raided the Barracks bathhouse. In response, a support group called the December 9 Defence Fund was established to provide the 28 men arrested in the raid with legal assistance and some limited funding. Later, in March 1979, the group was renamed the Right to Privacy Committee. The RTPC was dissolved at the last annual meeting on February 9, 1991, after the group felt its presence in Toronto was not as necessary as it once had been. The RTPC archives, which include posters, photographs, recordings, minutes, reports and more, are located in The ArQuives in Toronto.

== Activism ==
=== Anti-police ===
==== News and Views ====
On March 15, 1979, the RTPC circulated copies of News and Views, the official publication of the Toronto Police Association, which featured racist and homophobic articles. By April 5, 1979, the RTPC had organized a meeting with the Metropolitan Board of Commissioners of Police to discuss concerns about Tom Moclair's homophobic article "The Homosexual Fad", which had been published in the March 1979 issue of News and Views. At the meeting, they gay delegation presented the police board with a brief entitled Our Police Force Too! which outlined ten demands, one of which asked for the establishment of a permanent, Toronto gay-police liaison. The brief was written by John Alan Lee, Peter Maloney, and George Hislop. The Board of Commissioners responded on May 31, 1979, with a seventy-page brief entitled "Declaration of Concern and Intent (Standing Order 25)", which made no specific mention of sexual orientation. Community minority groups denounced the brief and demanded further action. In June 1979 both Metro Council and the City of Toronto Council passed resolutions that called on the Metropolitan Board of Commissioners of Police to answer specific demands by the gay and minority communities. However, the Ontario Police Commission later released a report that denied these requests and dismissed demands for a civilian-police liaison.

==== Raid of Don Franco's home ====
On June 6, Don Franco was charged with keeping a common bawdy house in his home. Franco, a teacher, advertised for partners in The Body Politic and had been one of many arrested in the December 9, 1978, Barracks raids. He also served as the RTPC's membership secretary. The police informed the school where Franco was working of his activities, and confiscated several items, such as membership lists for the RTPC and the New Democratic Party Gay Caucus. The raid was condemned by the gay community as an act of revenge by the police and the case made history, as it was the first home where no prostitution or sex with minors was occurring to be charged under bawdy house law.

==== Police harassment ====
The RTPC and the Working Group on Police Minority Relations, at a press conference they held on June 18, 1979, called on the Ontario Police Commission to investigate harassment of gay people within the Metro Toronto Police Force. They demanded the resignation of Toronto Police Chief Harold Adamson if he was unable to control the behaviour of his officers. On June 25, a meeting was held by ReforMetro to discuss continuing police harassment of gay people and other minorities. Brent Hawkes again called for the resignation of Adamson, and the meeting culminated in a spontaneous demonstration outside police headquarters.

==== Bathhouse raids ====
Beginning with the December 9, 1979 raid on the Barracks bathhouse, the RTPC continued to support men charged in future raids bawdy house offences. This included the October 11, 1979, raid on the Hot Tub Club, 9 Isabella Street, four apartments, and a cottage in Northumberland County; larger raids occurred later.

On February 5, 1981, after six months of preparation, Metro Toronto Police simultaneously raided four of the city's most prominent steam baths and charged 304 men as found-ins and 20 men as keepers. It was both the largest raid against gay establishments at that time, and the biggest mass arrest in Toronto's history after the War Measures Act of 1970. In response to the raids, which police had codenamed Operation Soap, the RTPC with the Coalition for Gay Rights, the Metropolitan Community Church, and The Body Politic, organized a demonstration for February 6, 1981. The demonstration, a march to Toronto police headquarters and then to the Ontario Legislature, grew from 300 people to 3,000 as the night went on. Eleven people were arrested as a result, and reports later revealed that several plainclothes officers acted as agents provocateurs during the demonstration, provoking protestors to acts of violence or destruction of property and then arresting them. The RTPC then formed a Public Action Committee and held a second demonstration, both of which called for the repeal of bawdy house laws.

Another large raid occurred on June 16, 1981, when twenty-three police officers simultaneously raided the International Steam Bath and the Back Door Gym and Sauna. Later, on June 20, 1981, the RTPC organized a demonstration. As the peaceful demonstration of around 1,000 people was ending, a group of protestors leaving the demonstration were attacked on the corner of Church and Charles streets by an anti-gay group. When the demonstrators fought back, police protected the anti-gay group while also attacking the demonstrators. Six people were injured and six people were arrested. The event later became known as the Battle of Church Street. Brent Hawkes and Ken Popert were injured by the police, but both failed in their attempts to press charges.

=== Subsidiaries ===
In 1981, due to an increase in violence against gays, the RTPC founded the Toronto Gay Street Patrol, a group of gay and lesbian men and women trained in self-defence, which patrolled various neighbourhoods, attempted to protect gay and lesbians from gay bashing, and tried to deal with the negative attitudes of police after an attack had been reported. The group was helmed by Dennis Findlay. The RTPC also established, in July 1982, Gay Court Watch, which sent volunteers to observe gay-related trials, especially trials related to the bawdy house law and various bathhouse raids. The group also regularly published reports on the frequency and location of arrests related to gay crimes in The Body Politic and Xtra!, and published pocket reference guides of places to avoid for safe, semi-public sex in Toronto. Gay Court Watch was active until December 1991.

In order to oversee the large amounts of funding raised to defend men charged during the bath raids, the RTPC established the Right to Privacy Foundation to ensure the equitable distribution of money. The RTPC had raised over $80,000 the year after the raids through events, dances, and direct mail campaigns.

=== Legislation ===
The RTPC has made submissions to the following:

- 1981: Brumner Commission on relations between the Toronto police and gay community
- 1982: Parliamentary Committee considering changes to bawdy house laws
- 1984: House of Commons Special Committee on Pornography and Prostitution
- 1984: Justice Committee of the Ontario Legislature regarding Bill 7 (which prohibited sexual orientation as a ground of discrimination in Ontario)
- 1986: Ontario Human Rights Code (on the addition of sexual orientation)

=== Periodicals ===
Periodicals associated with RTPC include:

- Action (December 1979–February 1985)
- RTPC/TBP Newsbreak (November 1979–May 1982)

=== Other activities ===
The RTPC participated in many other demonstrations, conferences and campaigns, including:

- June 2, 1979: A march to the Toronto police headquarters on 590 Jarvis street, in response to their raids on, and seizures of material from, the Barracks and The Body Politic. The group, helmed by John Argue, presented Deputy Chief Jack Ackroyd with a "People's Writ of Return".
- March 7, 1981: A march through downtown Toronto, under the banners of the RTPC and Gays and Lesbians Against the Right Everywhere (GLARE), in support of International Women's Day.
- May 1981: The "Boycott Ontario" advertisement campaign, which warned gay tourists away from visiting Toronto due to the continued bathhouse raids. The ad was included in Travel Agent, Travel Weekly, and the New York Times travel section.
- May 9, 1981: A discussion entitled "Being Gay in Toronto Now", which explored ways to develop a sense of gay community in Toronto.
- June 2, 1981: A press conference with representatives from forty different Metro Toronto minority organizations which denounced the inadequacies of the May 15, 1981, police complaints bill passed through the Ontario legislature.
- June 12, 1981: A demonstration in response to the verdict of the Barracks trial and in solidarity with the Pisces Spa raid in Edmonton, at the corner of Yonge and Wellesley, which included over 2,000 people.
- September 24, 1981: A victory march celebrating the acquittal of Don Franco.
- June 2, 1982: A full-page advertisement in the Globe and Mail demanding the repeal of the bawdy house laws.

== See also ==
- Timeline of LGBTQ history in Canada
- LGBTQ rights in Canada
