= Fag Rag =

Radical gay men's newspaper of the 1970s and '80s

- First issue of newspaper
- Type: Gay men's newspaper, quarterly
- Founder: The Fag Rag Collective
- Publisher: The Fag Rag Collective
- Staff writers: Larry Martin; Charley Shively; Michael Bronski; Thom Nickels; John Mitzel
- Founded: June 1971
- Ceased publication: c. 1987
- City: Boston
- Circulation: ~5000

Fag Rag was an American gay men's newspaper, published from 1971 until circa 1987, with issue #44 being the last known edition. The publishers were the Boston-based Fag Rag Collective, which consisted of radical writers, artists and activists. Notable members were Larry Martin, Charley Shively, Michael Bronski, Thom Nickels, Kevin McGirr, and John Mitzel. In its early years the subscription list was between 400 and 500, with an additional 4,500 copies sold on newsstands and bookstores or given away.

During its run, Fag Rag published interviews with, and writing by, prominent gay and bisexual authors including William S. Burroughs, Allen Ginsberg, John Giorno, Christopher Isherwood, John Wieners, Arthur Evans, Allen Young, Maurice Kenny, Gerard Malanga, John Rechy, Ned Rorem, and Gore Vidal.

== History and background ==
The newspaper originally started out as Lavender Vision, a coed organization with both gay men and lesbians, with half of the periodical devoted to men, and the other half to women. After a few issues though, the lesbians left to start their own publication. After they left, the men debated titles for their new publication, such as: Surrender Dorothy and Kumquat Times, before settling on Fag Rag, which Mitzel said was "to the point".

Shively described Fag Rag as offering up a collection of "sexual liberation, anarchism, hippie love, drugs, peace, maoism, marxism, rock and roll, folk song, cultural separatist, feminist, effeminist, tofu/brown rice, communal living, urban junkie, rural purist, nudist, leather, high camp drag, gender fuck drag, poetry, essays and pictures". They reported on multiple LGBT topics, including: gay Vietnam servicemen, the Cuban gay scene, gay senior citizens, the gay community with special needs, sex workers, and interracial LGBT relationships. They also had the standard fare for a gay newspaper; local news, editorials, poems, artwork, short stories and cartoons. The first issue argued for gay men not to be embarrassed or ashamed when called "cocksucker", but to wear the moniker proudly.

The periodical refused advertisements, claiming ads were “bribery and ugly", so they relied on being funded by donations, sales and the intermittent government grant. The volunteer staff would gather in the basement of a local book store, where editorial judgements were made as a group. They made a conscious decision not to showcase writings that demonstrated approval towards, "God, family, state or other oppressive institutions". Bronski, who started in 1972, described their gatherings as “fun and gossipy". They also had problems getting the newspaper published. As Shively tells it, one press shop informed him it couldn’t print Fag Rag on the same printing press they used to print Bibles.

In 1972, they started the Good Gay Poets Press, which was a pun on Walt Whitman’s label as the 'Good Gray Poet'. Shively saw the 'Poets' as a pathway for authors to have freedom to write "whatever and however" they wanted to. Maurice Kenny, the first known LGBT Native author to publish openly queer writings in the United States, contributed poems to the newspaper. They started out publishing with the intentions of a regular quarterly basis, but as the years passed it became sporadic, with issues 30 through 39 being one special 12th anniversary special. The publication ceased operations in 1987.

In his Fag Rag interview, Gore Vidal famously called Truman Capote "a Republican housewife from Kansas with all the prejudices," and described Norman Mailer as "a VFW commander in Schenectady."

== Arson ==
The Fag Rag collective shared offices with the Gay Community News. On July 7, 1982, the building shared by them was set on fire by a group of firemen, policemen and security guards, who had set a number of fires in the city. (Note: View of the façade of at 22 Bromfield Street where Gay Community News and Fag Rag had its offices above.) The fire destroyed all back issues of GCN and Fag Rag. According to testimony from two of the arsonists, Gregg Bemis and Robert Groblewski, their arson ring set over 200 fires in 1982 and 1983, mostly in Boston. They said their motive was to scare Boston voters into repealing Proposition 2½, a state tax-limiting measure which would lay off or freeze hiring of firefighters. The ringleader of the group, Donald Stackpole, was sentenced to 40 years in federal prison. The group of arsonists were ultimately held responsible for the destruction of more than $50 million worth of property, and at the time, the arson case was considered to be the largest in state or federal history.

In October 1982, The Body Politic reported that a right-wing paramilitary group identifying themselves as the 'Werewolves' had put up flyers in the Boston region alleging they were responsible for the fire. In addition, they threatened to "follow up" by killing lesbians and gays.

== Analysis and critique ==
Jonah Raskin opined that Fag Rag had a "proselytizing air" about it. He suggested they wanted to convert heterosexuals to the LGBT world, so they could "develop a sense of gay pride". He argues that the name of the publication itself was designed to be objectionable to the "straight world of heterosexuals", and that the name celebrates faggots, "as the writers define themselves".

Raymond Jean-Frontain wrote that Fag Rag often included provocative photographs of men bending over or spreading their legs wide open "in an invitation to participate in ass fucking as an act of revolution". He states the newspaper refused to "keep hidden what society was determined to control" through censorship, and that the men in these photos illustrated the "world quite literally turned upside down".

Jim Downs opined that Shively "wrote himself into history, becoming part of the historical record and embedding his perspective in the public memory that would dictate the course of gay history for the next few decades".

New Hampshire governor Meldrim Thomson described the newspaper, after seeing a copy of it, as "the most loathsome publication in the English language". Thompson had been attending a play by Jonathan Ned Katz at the University of New Hampshire, and Shively was selling the newspaper there, which prompted his visceral reaction.

== Publication history ==
Publication history (sporadic)
Issue	Date	Notes
1	June 1971	
2	Fall 1971	
3	Summer 1972	
4	January 1973	
5	Summer 1973	
6	Fall/Winter 1973	
7/8	Winter/Spring 1974	
9	Summer 1974	Stonewall 5th Anniversary Issue
10	Fall 1974	
11	Winter 1974	
12	Spring 1975	
13	Summer 1975	
14	November/December 1975	
15	February/March 1976	
16/17	June/July 1976	Fifth Anniversary Special
18	Fall/Winter 1976	
19	Spring 1977	
20	Spring 1977	
21/22	February/March 1978	Cold Weather Issue
23/24	Fall 1978	
25	1979	
26	1979	
27/28	1980	Supplement: Folie A Deux a play by Maya Silverthorne
29	1981	
30-39	1983	Special 12th Anniversary Issue
40	1984	
41	1986	Includes premier issue of Bad Attitudes: A Lesbian Sex Magazine
42/43	1987	
44	1987	Special binding
Source: Digital Collections of The History Project

== See also ==
- Come Out!
- History of LGBT in journalism
- List of LGBT periodicals

== Sources ==
- Streitmatter, Rodger (1995). "Defining Gay Male Culture". Unspeakable: The Rise of the Gay and Lesbian Press in America. Boston: Faber and Faber. ISBN 978-0-571-19873-3. OCLC 32745788.
- Downs, Jim (2016). Stand By Me: The Forgotten History of Gay Liberation. New York: Basic Books. ISBN 9780465032709. LCCN 2015040030. OCLC 920018216.
