= John Damien =

John Damien (1933–1986) was a Canadian horse racing steward, whose wrongful dismissal suit after being fired by the Ontario Racing Commission in 1975 for being gay was a landmark early LGBTQ rights case in Canada, and ultimately resulted in the addition of sexual orientation as a protected class under the Ontario Human Rights Code in 1986.

== Background ==
Born and raised in Windsor, Ontario, Damien began his career as a jockey in the early 1950s, later becoming a horse trainer before transitioning into administrative roles with race tracks in the late 1960s. He was appointed as a steward at Woodbine Racetrack in 1970.

On February 6, 1975, Damien was called into a meeting with P.C. Williams, the personnel director of the Ministry of Consumer and Commercial Relations, and informed that his employment contract would not be renewed for the upcoming racing season due to his sexual orientation; according to Damien, Williams stated that being gay might prejudice Damien's judgement, such as by leading him to make unfair decisions based solely on sexual attraction to a jockey, or by leaving him open to blackmail.

He was offered a letter of recommendation and a severance package of $1,200 on the condition that he voluntarily resign from the job. After he refused, the commission subsequently increased its financial offer to $1,700, amounting to $85 for each year he had worked for the commission, but he again refused the offer. He also noted that since his colleagues at Woodbine knew he was gay and largely didn't have an issue with it, there was no actual danger of blackmail.

He approached various gay rights organizations, including the Gay Alliance Toward Equality (GATE) and the Coalition for Gay Rights in Ontario (CGRO) to plan legal strategies, and announced on February 14 that he was taking his case to the Ontario Human Rights Commission.

Staff of the racing commission subsequently gave contradictory accounts of the reasons for his dismissal to the press; Williams claimed that the dismissal was not over Damien's sexuality, but declined to elaborate on any other reasons, while commission chair Charles MacNaughton claimed that Damien was not dismissed for being gay, but for being in a sexual relationship with another commission employee who could potentially place Damien in a conflict of interest if he were ever called upon to adjudicate a race involving his partner, despite the fact that the partner was employed in a support staff role and not as a jockey. A few days later, however, MacNaughton was quoted by a journalist as dismissing Damien's complaint with "Well, what do you expect? He's a faggot."

== Ontario Human Rights Commission ==
The Human Rights Commission agreed in September 1975 to hear Damien's complaint, but ruled in December 1975 that it did not have jurisdiction over the matter as sexual orientation was not protected in the Human Rights Code. Damien then appealed to the Supreme Court of Ontario, but dropped his appeal in July 1976 after deciding to proceed with a civil lawsuit instead.

Despite having declined to rule on his case in 1975, by 1977 the Human Rights Commission released a report explicitly calling for legislative changes to protect gay people from discrimination, specifically citing Damien's case as an example of why the changes were needed. In the same year, Ontario Liberal Party MPP Margaret Campbell introduced a private member's bill to add sexual orientation to the human rights code, which was defeated; over the next several years, LGBTQ and civil rights groups continued to lobby the provincial government on the matter, and a second bill put forward by the Ontario New Democratic Party to add sexual orientation to the human rights code failed in 1981.

== Civil suits ==
Key supporters of Damien's case included Michael Lynch and Chris Bearchell, who were the leaders of a dedicated Committee to Defend John Damien; Tom Warner of the CGRO; journalists June Callwood and Robert Fulford; and civil rights lawyer Harry Kopyto.

He subsequently also launched a personal lawsuit against Thoreau Willard O'Mulvenny, the medical doctor who initially reported Damien's sexuality to the commission. O'Mulvenny died in 1979, although the case continued against his estate.

However, the Ontario Progressive Conservative Party government regularly used legal tactics to delay the proceedings, which left Damien deeply in debt as his legal bills mounted, and he was forced to accept low-paying jobs outside of his field. By 1978 he was forced to file for bankruptcy. At various times during the process, the government offered him financial settlements that were conditional on him agreeing to a gag order limiting his ability to speak publicly about the case, which Damien refused on the grounds that the gag order would have forced the discontinuation of a book and a documentary film that were both already in development. By 1980 he was running his own car delivery service, which provided him enough financial stability that he was still in business as of 1985.

== Conclusion ==
Soon after the 1985 Ontario general election resulted in a Liberal/NDP coalition government taking over power from the Progressive Conservatives, the wrongful dismissal lawsuit was settled out of court in 1986; Damien was awarded $50,000, roughly equivalent to one year's salary at his prior pay rate with interest, but the payout was held in a trust account pending the final resolution of the court case.

In August 1986, Damien was diagnosed with pancreatic cancer, and rapidly became too ill to testify any further. He died on December 24, 1986, at his sister's home in Windsor. At the time of his death, the court case was scheduled to be heard in March 1987, although his death ultimately halted the process and he accordingly never received any payout from the trust fund.

An amendment adding sexual orientation to the provincial human rights code, proposed by MPP Evelyn Gigantes, was successfully passed in December 1986, a few weeks before Damien's death.

== Legacy ==
In 2011, the LGBTQ sports magazine OutSports named the Damien case as one of the 100 most important moments in LGBTQ sports history.
