= Ian Young (writer) =

Canadian writer

- Born: January 5, 1945 (age 81)
- Occupations: non-fiction, journalism, poetry
- Writing career
- Period: 1970s-present
- Notable works: The Gay Muse, The Male Homosexual in Literature

Ian Young (born January 5, 1945) is an English-Canadian poet, editor, literary critic, and historian. He was a member of the University of Toronto Homophile Association, the first post-Stonewall gay organization in Canada. He founded Canada's first gay publishing company, Catalyst Press, in 1970, printing over thirty works of poetry and fiction by Canadian, British, and American writers until the press ceased operation in 1980. His work has appeared in Canadian Notes & Queries, The Gay & Lesbian Review Worldwide, Rites and Continuum, as well as in more than fifty anthologies. He was a regular columnist for The Body Politic from 1975 to 1985 and for Torso between 1991 and 2008.

Young is best known for his work as editor of the anthology The Gay Muse and the bibliography The Male Homosexual in Literature. He edited The Male Muse: A Gay Anthology, the first English-language anthology of poetry with gay male themes. In 1974, a shipment of The Male Muse was seized and burned by British customs officials.

He was interested in ceremonial magic during the 1980s and was a founding member of the Hermetic Order of the Silver Sword.

His book, Encounters with Authors (2013), featured historical and critical essays on the work of three noted Canadian LGBT writers, Scott Symons, Robin Hardy and Norman Elder.

== Publications ==
- White Garland: 9 Poems for Richard (1969)
- Year of the Quiet Sun (1969)
- Double Exposure (1970, 2nd edition 1974)
- Lions in the Stream (1971) (with Richard Phelan)
- Some Green Moths (1972)
- Invisible Words (1974)
- The Male Homosexual in Literature: A Bibliography (1976; 2nd edition 1982)
- Common-or-Garden Gods (1976)
- Son of the Male Muse (1983)
- Gay Resistance: Homosexuals in the Anti-Nazi Underground (1985)
- Sex Magick (1986)
- The AIDS Dissidents: An Annotated Bibliography (1993)
- The Stonewall Experiment: A Gay Psychohistory (1995)
- The AIDS Cult: Essays On the Gay Health Crisis (1997) (with John Lauritsen)
- Out in Paperback: A Visual History of Gay Pulps (2012)
- Encounters with Authors: Essays on Scott Symons, Robin Hardy, Norman Elder (2013)
- London Skin & Bones: The Finsbury Park Stories (2017)
- The Male Homosexual in Literature: A Bibliography Supplement (2020)

== See also ==
- Canadian literature
- Canadian poetry
- List of Canadian poets
- List of Canadian writers
- HIV/AIDS denialism
- Homoerotic poetry
