= Jearld Moldenhauer =

LGBT rights activist

- Born: Jearld Frederick Moldenhauer; August 9, 1946 (age 80); Niagara Falls, New York, United States
- Education: Cornell University
- Occupations: Bookseller, activist

Jearld Frederick Moldenhauer (born August 9, 1946) is a Canadian gay activist and businessperson who is the founder of the University of Toronto Homophile Association, the Cornell Student Homophile League and gay magazine The Body Politic. He is also a founding member of Toronto Gay Action and the Gay Alliance Toward Equality. On February 13, 1972, he became the first gay liberation representative to address a political party conference in Canada when he addressed a convention of The Waffle, a left-wing faction of the New Democratic Party.

In 1973 he began collecting the books, newspapers and ephemera that grew into the Canadian Lesbian & Gay Archives. He opened Glad Day Bookshop, the first gay and lesbian bookstore in Canada, in 1970 and operated it until 1991 when he sold the store to John Scythes. Glad Day Bookshop Toronto is considered the oldest gay/lesbian bookshop in the world.

== Biography ==
Moldenhauer was born in Niagara Falls, New York, on August 9, 1946.

In May 1968 he founded the Cornell Student Homophile League, which was the second homophile group established at an American university. He graduated from Cornell University in 1969. The same year, he moved to Canada and worked as a research assistant in the Physiology Department at the University of Toronto. There he founded the University of Toronto Homophile Association (UTHA), which held its first meeting on October 24, 1969. UTHA was the first student homophile organization in Canada, and the first gay and lesbian group to be established in Toronto; in 1970, it inspired the founding of the Community Homophile Association of Toronto.

The University of Toronto fired him for founding the UTHA in January 1970. Moldenhauer was a photographer and demonstrator at the We Demand Rally on August 28, 1971. Significant edits to an article about the rally in the magazine Guerilla led to Moldenhauer founding The Body Politic.

Moldenhauer founded the Glad Day Bookshop in November 1970, after noticing that gay literature that was emerging after Stonewall was not available in Canada. Moldenhauer sold books out of his backpack at rallies, meetings and parties, and offered a small mail order service. In its early days, Glad Day Bookshop operated out of Moldenhauer's 65 Kendal Avenue apartment, located in The Annex. This apartment also served as The Body Politic's office. The bookstore became the first significant target of censorship of gay and lesbian literature by the Canadian government. This escalated in 1986 when the government of prime minister Brian Mulroney created internal memorandum D-9-1-1, which was distributed to all Canada Customs agents. The memorandum essentially encouraged border agents to declare almost all incoming gay and lesbian literature to be "obscene" and therefore inadmissible. In the decade that followed Glad Day Bookshop went through four separate court cases challenging censorship. The most famous of these was the 1987 court decision that overturned the banning of The Joy of Gay Sex by Charles Silverstein and Edmund White.

On February 13, 1972, Moldenhauer became the first gay liberation representative to address a political party conference in Canada when he addressed a session of the New Democratic Party Waffle convention.
