= Mitzel =

Mitzel is a surname. Notable people with the surname include:

- John Mitzel (1948–2013), American writer, publisher, bookseller, and gay community and cultural activist
- Len Mitzel (1946–2017), Canadian politician
- Marilyn Mitzel, American television reporter and news anchor
