= Michael Lynch (professor) =

Canadian professor and activist (1944–1991)

- Born: 1944; Dunn, North Carolina, U.S.
- Died: July 9, 1991 (aged 46–47)
- Occupations: Professor; poet; journalist; activist
- Years active: 1971–1991
- Organizations: Gay Academic Union; Gay Alliance Toward Equality
- Spouse: Gail Lynch (m. 1969; sep. 1977)
- Children: 1

Academic background
- Education: Goddard College; University of Iowa

Academic work
- Institutions: University of Toronto

Michael Lynch (1944 – July 9, 1991) was an American-born Canadian professor, poet, journalist, and activist, most noted as a pioneer of gay studies in Canadian academia and as an important member of many significant LGBT rights and HIV/AIDS organizations in Toronto.

== Early life and education ==
Lynch was born and raised in Dunn, North Carolina. He studied at Goddard College and the University of Iowa and wrote his doctoral dissertation on the poetry of Wallace Stevens.

== Career ==
After coming out as a gay man in 1973, Lynch was a writer and a contributing editor for The Body Politic.

From 1971 to 1990, Lynch taught in the Department of English at the University of Toronto. Initially a professor at St. Michael's College, he taught the first gay studies course offered at a Canadian university in 1974, through the University of Toronto. Following public controversy around the course, St. Michael's College asked him to stop teaching the course and to stop making public statements about homosexuality. He transferred to Erindale College to continue his advocacy at the university.

He was a founding member of the Toronto chapters of Gay Alliance Toward Equality and the Gay Academic Union, and a founding member of Gay Fathers Toronto. In 1980, he convened the first academic conference on the topic of Walt Whitman's 1880 visit to London, Ontario. He helped found the Toronto Centre for Lesbian and Gay Studies (now the Mark S. Bonham Centre for Sexual Diversity Studies), which continues to offer an annual academic grant in his name.

He published a collection of poetry, These Waves of Dying Friends, in 1989.

At the time of his death, he had an unfinished gay studies manuscript, The Age of Adhesiveness: From Friendship to Homosexuality, in development. The book was an expansion of an earlier academic paper, for which he won Crompton-Noll Award from the Lesbian and Gay Caucus of the Modern Language Association in 1981. He also served as the editor of the Lesbian and Gay Caucus's Gay Studies Newsletter.

== Personal life ==
Lynch married Gail Lynch (née Jones) on July 5, 1969. At this point, he had known for years that he was attracted to men; he had told Gail as much, and they both agreed that his attraction to men did not deter them from wanting to be married. He moved to Toronto with her in 1971 in order to take a job as an English professor at the University of Toronto. They had a son, Stefan, in 1972. Lynch came out as a gay man in 1973, and in 1977, he and Gail separated.

Lynch was a close friend of fellow queer studies scholar Eve Kosofsky Sedgwick. Sedgwick wrote her May 1991 essay "White Glasses" as a memorial for Lynch while he was still alive. Lynch died later that same year, on July 9, 1991.

=== Activism ===
Lynch was a committed AIDS activist from the dawn of the AIDS crisis in 1981 until his death in 1991, including as a founding member of AIDS Action Now!, the AIDS Committee of Toronto and the AIDS Memorial in Toronto's Barbara Hall Park.

== Honours and awards ==
In honour of his role as a significant contributor to LGBT culture and history in Canada, a portrait of Lynch by Gerald Hannon is held by The ArQuives' National Portrait Collection.

A biography of Lynch, AIDS Activist: Michael Lynch and the Politics of Community, was published by Ann Silversides in 2003.
