= William Keiser =

American journalist and podcast host

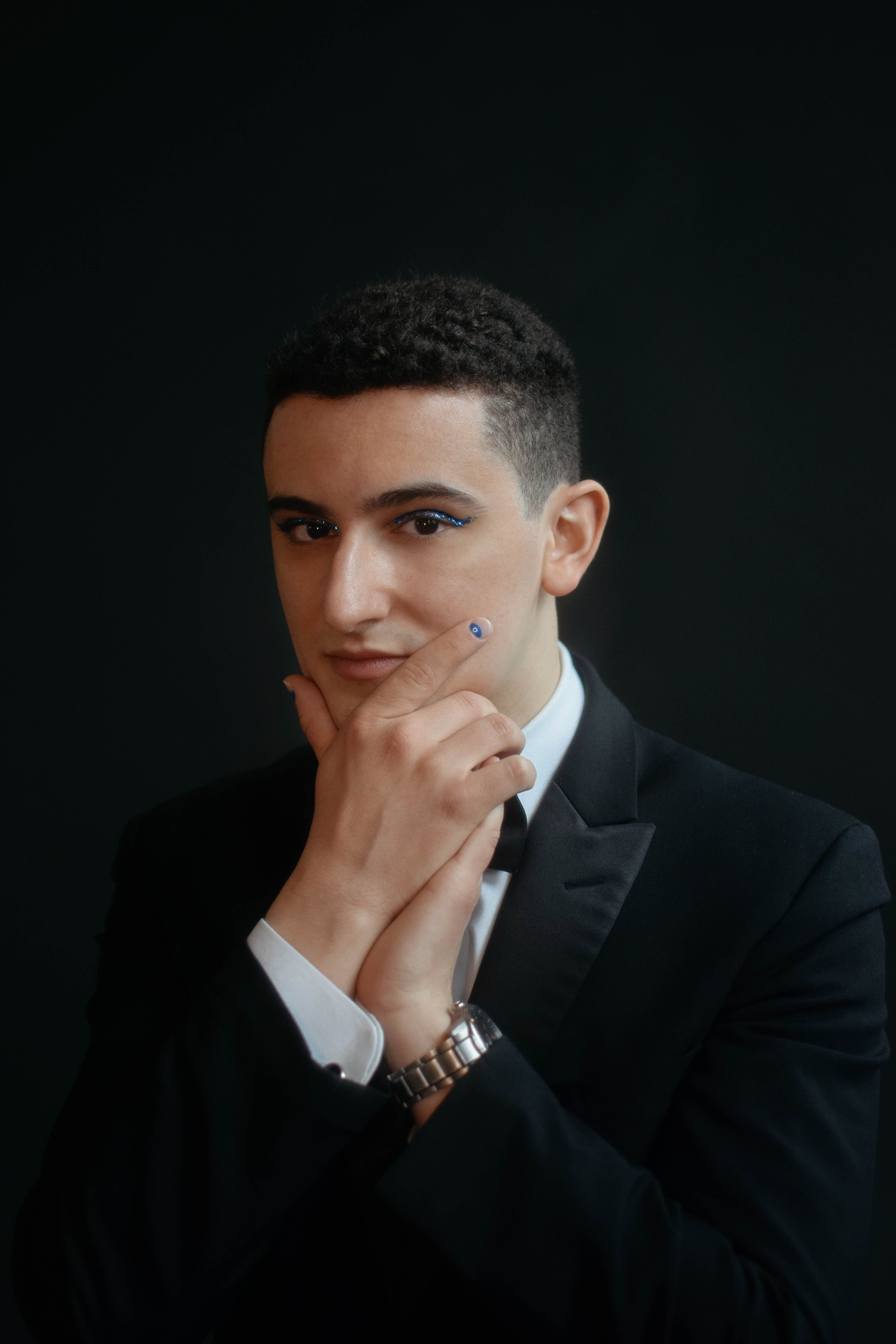
Keiser in 2021

William Keiser (born 1996) is an American screenwriter and podcast host. His work has been published in the Los Angeles Times and other publications and concerns youth and social hierarchy in LGBTQ communities.

== Biography ==
Keiser was born in Fort Lauderdale, Florida and grew up boating with his parents. He attended Princeton University.

== Career ==
In 2022, Keiser created popular, a three-part narrative podcast about hierarchies in LGBTQ Washington, DC communities, with The Gay and Lesbian Review Worldwide. The podcast features LGBTQ writers Andrew Holleran and Brandan Robertson and discusses stratification and negotiations of consent in the city's queer nightlife and sports leagues.

In 2023, Keiser published two op-eds in the LA Times: one about a date on which he was body-shamed and one about a two-state solution to the Israeli–Palestinian conflict, which was run nationally in newspapers through the Tribune Content Agency.

Keiser was selected as a Lambda Literary Foundation Emerging Artist Fellow in Screenwriting in 2024, studying under Rasheed Newson.
