= Thom Nickels =

American conservative commentator, author, and columnist

Thom Nickels is a Philadelphia-based conservative commentator, author, and columnist. He has written fifteen literary works, is the previous recipient of the 2005 Philadelphia AIA Lewis Mumford Architecture Journalism Award, and was nominated for a Lambda Literary Award and a Hugo Award for his book, Two Novellas.

== Biography ==
Born in Darby, Pennsylvania, Thom Nickels grew up in Chester County where he went to Great Valley High School in Malvern. He enrolled in Philadelphia's Charles Morris Price School of Journalism where he co-edited the school's magazine, The New Price Review. Nickels then enrolled in Baltimore's Eastern College on Mt. Vernon Square where he majored in Liberal Arts. Nickels was a conscientious objector during the Vietnam War and did his national alternate service at Tufts-New England Medical Center in Boston. Nickels wrote for the gay underground press in Boston (Fag Rag), and Cambridge. In Philadelphia, during the 1970s, Nickels was a columnist and feature writer for Distant Drummer.

He wrote a number of articles as a contributing writer for the Gay and Lesbian Review from 2004 to 2011 and was the Spiritual Editor for the Lambda Literary, formerly the Lambda Book Review. Nickels has been a columnist for Philadelphia Magazine, the Philadelphia Welcomat. the Philadelphia Daily News, and PJ Media. He currently writes regularly for City Journal, New York, the Philadelphia Irish Edition and the Philadelphia Free Press.

In 1998, he co-founded The Arts Defense League and helped to spearhead a citywide movement to keep the Maxfield Parrish mural, "Dream Garden," in Philadelphia. He was interviewed by People magazine, The Philadelphia Inquirer, The Daily News, and NPR.

== Controversy ==
Nickels currently works as a journalist and opinion writer for Philadelphia, where he often criticizes "PC culture" and leftist politics. In an article published after the London terrorist attack in March 2017, he writes, "I don't hate Muslims - I hate the ideology of Islam." In response to Philadelphia's theatre scene and the practice of gender- and race-conscious casting, Nickels writes, "it's repetitive brainwashing minus the art." In an article published on HuffPost in 2013, Nickels defends a widely criticized skit in the Philadelphia Mummers Parade in which white participants dressed up in stereotypical Native American costumes, writing, "Welcome once again to our super-hypersensitive world." Nickels' article fueled a great deal of anger, especially from Leftist Native American advocacy organizations. One piece confronted Nickels, claiming, "'The First Amendment protects (to an extent) your right to be culturally tone deaf and offensive. But if you're going to deliberately provoke offense, have the guts to own it. Don't go parading your ignorance in other people's faces and then deride them as overly-sensitive when they are offended by your deliberate offensiveness.'" Nickels responded: "It's my work. I stand by it."

In 2001, while Nickels worked as a freelance columnist for The Philadelphia Inquirer, he came under fire for writing an article that was based on fabrication. The story, "Painful silence makes the slaying of a gay man a double tragedy," details the senseless murder of a gay man in Philadelphia's Washington Square. Furthermore, Nickels claimed that "there was no news -- no mention -- of the killing in the daily press or on any of Philadelphia's TV stations," suggesting the man's sexuality to be the reason for the silence. It soon came out that no such murder actually occurred. According to Nickels, his informant, "Steve Lev," had made up the story, but Nickels, along with his Philadelphia Inquirer editor, never verified any of the facts The Inquirer published a five-paragraph retraction after the incident came to light. Nickels later defended himself, saying:

It's pretty distressing to me. I feel kind of caught in the middle. I really saw an injustice here and the injustice outraged me... I guess I expected the paper to work with me if they saw glitches and holes. The Inquirer erred, too... [Inquirer Opinion and Editorial Editor Chris Satullo] said he felt I had been victimized, but could not get past that dogmatic, technical point that I did not call the police.

== Selected works ==
- The Cliffs of Aries (1988)
- Two Novellas: Walking Water & After All This (1989)
- The Boy on the Bicycle (1991–1994)
- Manayunk (1997)
- Philadelphia Architecture
- SPORE. STARbooks Press. 2010. ISBN 978-1934187-71-5.
- Gay and Lesbian Philadelphia (2000)
- Tropic of Libra (2002)
- Out in History and Philadelphia Architecture (2005)
- Walking on Water and After All This (Starbooks, revised and updated from the 1989 version, 2012)
- Legendary Locals of Center City Philadelphia (Arcadia, 2014)
- Literary Philadelphia: A History of Prose and Poetry in the City of Brotherly Love (The History Press)
- Philadelphia Mansions: Stories and Characters Behind the Walls, (The History Press, 2018)
- Learn to Do a Bad Thing Well: Looking for Johnny Bobbitt (Amazon, 2018)
- The Perils of Homelessness (Amazon, April 2020)
- From Mother Divine to the Corner Swami: Religious Cults in Philadelphia (Fonthill Media, October 26, 2020)
