= Robin Hardy (Canadian writer) =

Canadian journalist and author (1952–1995)

- Born: July 12, 1952; Halifax, Nova Scotia, Canada
- Died: October 28, 1995 (aged 43); Tonto National Forest, Arizona USA
- Writing career
- Period: 1970s-1990s

Robin Clarkson Hardy (July 12, 1952 – October 28, 1995) was a Canadian journalist and author.

Born in Halifax, Nova Scotia and raised in Winnipeg, Manitoba and Ottawa, Ontario, Hardy studied creative writing at the University of Alberta and took a law degree at Dalhousie University before settling in Toronto, where he was a staff writer and editor of The Body Politic, a noted early Canadian gay magazine. He also produced radio documentaries for CBC Radio, contributed to publications including NOW, Canadian Forum and Fuse, and was an activist for and the first paid staff member of the Coalition for Lesbian and Gay Rights in Ontario.

He moved to New York City in 1984, where he was an editor for Cloverdale Press and a founding member of Publishing Triangle. He also wrote numerous young adult, science fiction, mystery and horror novels, primarily under pen names; Call of the Wendigo (1994) was the only novel he published under his own name. He was also a freelance contributor to publications including The Advocate, Village Voice and Penthouse in this era.

He also wrote poetry throughout his life, although this was never published as a book, and submitted a short story, "Ghosts", to the annual CBC Literary Competition.

He relocated to Tucson, Arizona in 1993.

On October 28, 1995, Hardy died in a hiking accident in Arizona's Tonto National Forest. His unfinished non-fiction manuscript The Landscape of Death: Gay Men, AIDS and the Crisis of Desire was completed by David Groff, and was published in 1999 under the title Crisis of Desire: AIDS and the Fate of Gay Brotherhood. The book was a shortlisted nominee in the Gay Studies category at the 12th Lambda Literary Awards.

Many of his papers and manuscripts are held by the archives of the New York Public Library. Along with Scott Symons and Norman Elder, he was the subject of a chapter in Ian Young's 2013 book Encounters with Authors: Essays on Scott Symons, Robin Hardy, Norman Elder.
