= Charley Shively =

American writer, anarchist and professor (1937–2017)

Charley Shively (1937–2017) was an American gay writer, anarchist and professor at the University of Massachusetts Boston. A scholar of Walt Whitman, he edited Drum Beats: Walt Whitman's Civil War Boy Lovers (1989) and Calamus Lovers: Walt Whitman's Working Class Camerados (1987). He wrote A History of the Conception of Death in America, 1650–1860.

== Early life ==
Charles Shively was born in 1937 in Gobbler's Knob, a rural suburb in Columbus, Ohio. He grew up in a poor, working-class family, and he helped raise his four younger siblings while engaging in school in music, writing, and debate. His scholarly talent earned him admission to Harvard's class of 1959 on financial aid.

== Activism ==
Shively was an activist against the Vietnam War. Following his graduation at Harvard University in 1969, he began working in gay activism. During the 25th anniversary of the Stonewall Riots, Charley Shively joined the Spirit of Stonewall group, which aimed to honor the original 1969 uprising's legacy of resistance and visibility for LGBTQ+ people. He appeared alongside Glenn Belverio, Bill Dobbs, and Harry Hay. Charley Shively noted that there were divisions inside the gay liberation movement, and looked to create a shared sense of identity. Shively cited divisions of race, gender, and class as reasons for tension in the gay liberation movement. He looked to loosen these tensions and solidify the movement to have a united front. He co-founded several gay groups including Fag Rag and the Gay and Lesbian Advocates and Defenders. He famously burned a copy of the bible and his Harvard diploma in protest at a Boston Pride march in 1977.

Shively started displaying symptoms of Alzheimer's in the early 2000s. He died in 2017 at a nursing home in Cambridge, Massachusetts.
