= Glad Day Bookshop =

LGBTQ bookstore in Canada

Coordinates: 43.648544°N 79.377594°W

- Interactive map of Glad Day Bookshop
- Location: 32 Lisgar Street, Toronto, Ontario, Canada
- Operator: MJ Lyons
- Type: Bookstore and restaurant
- Event: LGBTQ literature

Construction
- Opened: 1970; 56 years ago

Website
- gladdaybookshop.com

Glad Day Bookshop is an independent bookstore and restaurant located in Toronto, Ontario, specializing in LGBTQ literature. The store was located above the storefront at 598A Yonge Street for much of its history, and moved to a new location at 499 Church Street, in the heart of the city's Church and Wellesley neighbourhood, in 2016. In moved again to a temporary location at 32 Lisgar Street in July 2025 while the owners search for an affordable long term home. The store's name and logo are based on a painting by William Blake.

Since the closure of New York City's Oscar Wilde Bookshop in early 2009, Glad Day has been the oldest surviving LGBTQ bookstore in the world.

== History ==
Opened in 1970 by Jearld Moldenhauer, it was Canada's first bookstore targeted to the gay community. The bookstore originally operated out of Moldenhauer's 65 Kendal Avenue apartment located in The Annex, which also served as the original offices of The Body Politic. Moldenhauer later moved to a house in Kensington Market, where the bookstore and magazine operated out of a shed in his backyard. The store moved to its Yonge Street location in 1981 and relocated to Church Street in 2016.

In 1979, Moldenhauer opened a second location in Boston, Massachusetts. A fire destroyed the Boston building in 1982, but the store reopened in a different location a few weeks later.

In 1992, Glad Day was prosecuted under an anti-obscenity law, D9-1-1, for selling a magazine entitled Bad Attitude, which depicted a fictional "play rape scene" between lesbians. This law often targeted bookstores that sold LGBT-related content.

Norman Laurila, an employee of Glad Day in the 1970s, moved with his partner Richard Labonté and friend George Leigh in 1979 to Los Angeles, where the trio established the influential LGBT bookstore A Different Light.

Moldenhauer sold the Toronto Glad Day location to John Scythes in 1991, but retained ownership of the Boston store and continued to be involved in the Toronto store's operations. After the Boston store's landlord decided to convert the building into condominiums, Moldenhauer closed the store in 2000 when he and manager John Mitzel faced difficulty finding a suitable new location.

From 1998 to early 2005, the science fiction bookstore Bakka-Phoenix was located on the main floor of the same building as Glad Day's Toronto store.

After This Ain't the Rosedale Library left its Church Street location to move to Kensington Market in 2008, that store's former landlords offered Glad Day to take over the space, although due to high rent, the store opted not to move.

In late 2011, Scythes announced that he was putting the store up for sale due to declining revenues; the store was ultimately purchased by a collective of 22 community members, spearheaded by teacher Michael Erickson and also including former Xtra! managing editor Marcus McCann; former Pride Toronto executive director Fatima Amarshi; community activists Doug Kerr, Jill Andrew, and Michael Went; lawyer El-Farouk Khaki; and performer Troy Jackson.

Under its new ownership, the store took steps to revitalize its role as a cultural hub, adding an event space to host author readings, performances, and community group meetings, and conducting a crowdfunding campaign on Indiegogo in 2013 to fund and launch an online bookstore for LGBT titles. In June 2016, the store launched another Indiegogo campaign to help fund a planned move to a new location on Church Street, which would be more wheelchair-accessible than the Yonge Street store, and would enable the store to add new revenue streams including a coffee shop and licensed alcohol service at evening events. In July, the store announced that it was taking over Byzantium, a bar whose managers had opted to shut down around the same time. The space was renovated to become a flexible space that can be reconfigured from a bookstore into a venue for cultural performances and event gatherings as needed, serving food and drinks. The Church Street location kept a smaller selection of books on active display, although it maintained additional inventory in storage that could be ordered or requested.

In late May 2024, the store announced that it was at risk of eviction due to financial difficulties rooted in its loss of business income during the COVID-19 pandemic. A $100,000 emergency fundraising campaign surpassed its goal within days. A year later, in May 2025, the store announced that for financial reasons, it would temporarily relocate to a smaller location on Lisgar Street in the Queen Street West area of the city while working with the City of Toronto to secure a permanent new location.

Bar Bük, the bookstore and café that employs the main character Sabi in the television series Sort Of, was partially inspired by Glad Day.

== Notable events and programming ==
In 2015, the bookstore launched the Naked Heart Festival, an annual festival of LGBTQ literature. Workshops, panels, readings, and other events associated with the festival take place at the bookstore and other community spaces in the Church and Wellesley village.

After its move to the Church Street location with a kitchen and bar, Glad Day expanded programming in 2017 to include a weekly drag brunch on Sundays. The event has become a mainstay of the bookstore, attracting large crowds and promoting new uses for the space. Following its move to the smaller location on Lisgar Street, Glad Day continued hosting its drag brunches off-site at various restaurants.

The bookstore regularly welcomes author readings and Q&As presented by different groups, including the EW (Emerging Writers) Reading Series and the Brockton Writers Series.

== Social involvement ==
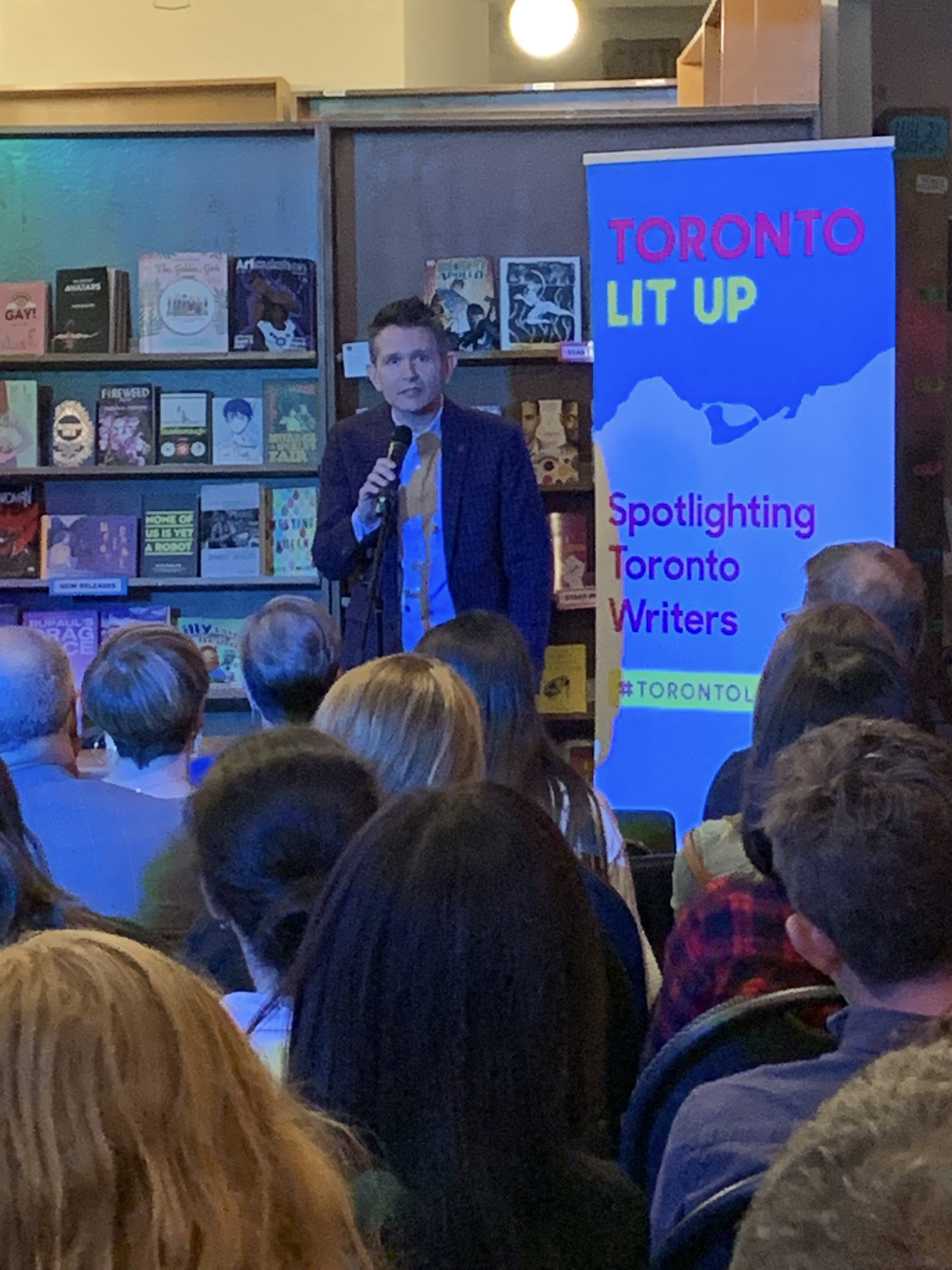
Brian Francis speaking at a 2019 event

The business frequently donates books to organizations such as the Pride Library at the University of Western Ontario.

Like its counterpart in Vancouver, Little Sister's, Glad Day's materials have been frequently confiscated by Canada Customs during importation as "obscene materials", culminating in the Ontario Superior Court of Justice case R v Glad Day Bookshops Inc in 2003.

During the COVID-19 pandemic in Canada, the store announced various plans to support LGBTQ artists and performers during the pandemic and the associated shutdown of most venues that they depend on for income, including a crowdfunded Emergency Survival Fund to provide loans and grants and GD TV, a Zoom-based online channel for LGBTQ artists, writers, musicians, dancers, and drag queens to livestream readings and performances. When retail stores were allowed to reopen for curbside pickup, the store added a table at its front window to permit the display and sale of a selection of books through the window.
