= The Gay & Lesbian Review Worldwide =

Magazine

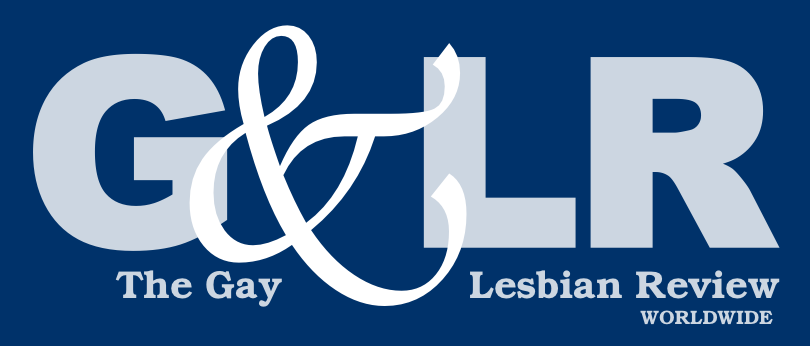

The Gay & Lesbian Review Worldwide (formerly The Harvard Gay & Lesbian Review) is a bimonthly, nationally distributed magazine of history, culture, and politics for LGBT people and their allies who are interested in the gamut of social, scientific, and cultural issues raised by same-sex sexuality. Library Journal (in its July 1995 issue) described it as "the journal of record for LGBT issues. Founded by Richard Schneider, it celebrated its 25th anniversary in 2018."

In 2011, the magazine received the Michele Karlsberg Leadership Award from the Publishing Triangle.

== History ==
Initially The Harvard Gay & Lesbian Review was published by the Harvard Gay & Lesbian Caucus. In 1996 the magazine was organized as a 501(c)(3) educational corporation. In 2000, the magazine's name was changed to The Gay & Lesbian Review Worldwide to reflect its independent status, and in 2001 the Review started to publish on a bimonthly basis. Since around 2017 December, the Review says it has a circulation of about 9,000 regular subscribers.

== Current status ==
Jeremy Fox is editor-in-chief, Richard Schneider is President,, Stephen Hemrick is Publisher, and Martha E. Stone is literary editor.

From the magazine's inception, each issue has been organized around a conceptual theme with essays from leading scholars and writers in the given field. Recent themes have included, for example, "The science of homosexuality", "Eros and God", and "Weird Psychology". In addition to these essays, which account for about 60% of the magazine's content, each issue offers book reviews, several poems, and special columns such as "International Spectrum" and "Artist's Profile". In February 2016, the Review launched a redesigned website, which offers a sampling of articles from the current and past issues, writers' guidelines, subscription information, and so on.

The mission of The Gay & Lesbian Review Worldwide is to provide a forum for enlightened discussion of issues and ideas of importance to lesbians and gay men; to advance gay and lesbian culture by providing a quality vehicle for its best writers and thinkers; and to educate a broader public on gay and lesbian topics.

Barney Frank has referred to The Review as the only place where he can write an article confident that the readership is both gay and intelligent. In a 1998 New York Times interview, Larry Kramer described The Gay & Lesbian Review as "our intellectual journal, for better or for worse. If you want to deal with scholarly intelligent arguments, there's really no place else we can publish."

In 2022, The Review expanded to podcasting with the launch of their first podcast, popular, on Spotify and Apple Podcasts, hosted by William Keiser. The podcast gained media attention for its dissection of the "dark underbelly of the District's queer community, with a specific focus on the cliques and clichés gay men face."

== Notable contributors ==
- Edward Albee
- David Bergman
- Michael Bronski
- Alfred Corn
- Samuel R. Delany
- John D'Emilio
- Emma Donoghue
- Martin Duberman
- Lillian Faderman
- Edward Field
- Barney Frank
- Jewelle Gomez
- Marilyn Hacker
- Andrew Holleran
- Jill Johnston
- Matthew Kennedy
- Larry Kramer
- John Lauritsen
- Terrence McNally
- Eileen Myles
- Thom Nickels
- William Percy
- Felice Picano
- John Rechy
- Ned Rorem
- Douglas Sadownick
- Sarah Schulman
- Gore Vidal
- Patricia Nell Warren
- Edmund White
- Evan Wolfson
