= We Demand Rally =

1971 gay rights demonstration in Canada

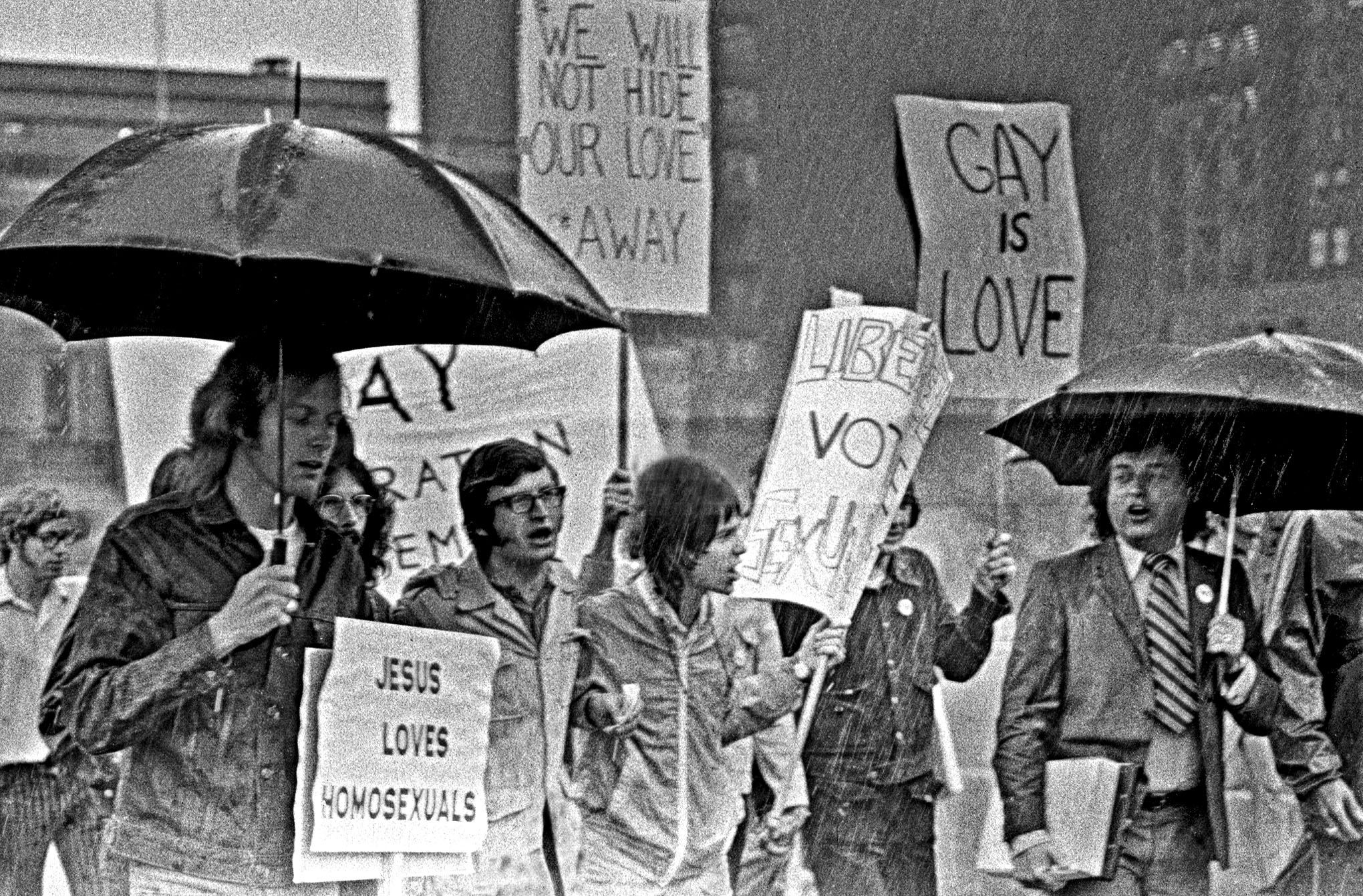
Demonstrators at the We Demand rally, August 28, 1971

The We Demand Rally was the first large scale gay rights demonstration in Canada. The rally occurred on August 28, 1971 in Ottawa, and was organized by the gay rights activist groups Toronto Gay Action (TGA) and Community Homophile Association of Toronto (CHAT). There was a parallel rally in Vancouver that was organized in solidarity with the rally by the Vancouver group Gay Alliance Toward Equality (GATE). The rally was a important to the gay rights movement in Canada, as well as to the history of feminism in Canada, and has had a lasting legacy in Canadian gay rights activism.

== Background ==
One of the catalysts for the demonstration was RCMP discrimination against homosexuals following the 1969 changes to the Criminal Code decriminalizing certain gay acts with the passing of Bill C-150; specifically, attempts by the RCMP to drive out gays and lesbians working in the civil service, government, and military, along with other forms of discrimination. Up to this point, discrimination against sexuality was not legally prohibited and there was no way to complain through human rights commissions. Other issues which drove the protest were the inequality of the Divorce Act, which placed homosexuality in the same category of severity for reasons to divorce as rape or bestiality, and the Immigration Act, which banned gay men from immigrating to Canada.

There had been a history of gay activism focusing on education and awareness in Canada before 1971, such as the work of ted northe, but there were no large-scale organizations or demonstrations up to this point.

== Rally ==
The Ottawa rally was organized by the groups Toronto Gay Action (TGA) and the Community Homophile Association of Toronto (CHAT). The rally contained approximately 200 demonstrators, coming from TGA, CHAT and other homophile and gay rights activist groups. The rally began with a march to the steps of Parliament Hill in Ottawa. The rally had speeches given by demonstrators such as Charlie Hill of Toronto Gay Action, George Hislop and Pat Murphy of CHAT, Pierre Mason of Le front de libération des homosexuels, and John Williams of Cleveland, Ohio. The demonstrators mainly consisted of white cisgender gay men. There was only one woman, Cheri DiNovo, who signed the original list of demands. The demonstrators called for the end to RCMP surveillance on gay workers, the end to medical discrimination and intervention, amendments to divorce laws, and equal civil rights to be extended to gay people and lesbians.

There was a parallel rally in Vancouver coordinated in solidarity and organized by Gay Alliance Toward Equality. Roedy Green, chairperson of GATE, spoke, as did representatives from Vancouver Gay Sisters and the GLF. There is some debate as to the number of attendees, with sources citing between 20 and 159.

=== Demands ===
The groups involved presented, as part of the demonstration, a 13-page document containing a list of demands to the Parliament of Canada, drafted by Herbert Spiers and Brian Waite of TGA with contributions from 12 gay activist groups across Canada under the name August 28 Gay Day Committee and signed by members of TGA. The document contained ten main demands:

1. Removing "buggery" and "gross indecency" as grounds for indictment as a dangerous sex offender
2. Amendments to the divorce act to allow for child custody to be decided based on parental merit rather than sexuality.
3. Removing homosexuality from the same category as physical or mental abuse, bestiality, and rape for grounds for divorce.
4. Amending the Immigration Act to allow homosexuals to immigrate and enter Canada.
5. Instituting an equal age of consent for both homosexual and heterosexual acts.
6. Disclosure from the Royal Canadian Mounted Police on whether they were spying on queer people working in the government and discontinuation of the practice immediately.
7. Equal employment and advancement in all levels of government.
8. Allowing gays, lesbians, and bisexuals to serve in the military.
9. Equal rights for lesbians, bisexuals, and gays.
10. Removal of "gross indecency" and "lewd acts" from the Criminal Code and replacement with terms equally applied to heterosexuals and homosexuals.

== Aftermath and legacy ==
As a direct result of the rally, the Immigration Act was amended, removing the ban on gay men from travelling and immigrating to Canada. All of the original ten demands of the rally have since been met and the laws they addressed have since been amended.

=== The Body Politic ===
The rally led to the creation of The Body Politic magazine by Jearld Moldenhauer, demonstrator and photographer of the rally. Moldenhauer, with a few other activists, was driven to create the magazine as a result of significant edits and alterations to an article Moldenhauer wrote about the rally and its demands for the working-class counterculture magazine Guerilla. The first issue of The Body Politic was published in November/December 1971 and contained articles about the Ottawa rally and its demands as well as the Vancouver rally, and used a picture of the rally as its cover.

The rally is profiled as a key moment in Canadian LGBTQ history in Noam Gonick's 2025 documentary film Parade: Queer Acts of Love and Resistance.

=== We Still Demand ===
On August 28, 2011, a commemorative march organized by Queer Ontario called We Still Demand was held on Parliament Hill to both celebrate reforms that had been won since the 1971 rally and to protest continued inequality and issues, such as the presence of police at pride events and LGBT homelessness.

A conference entitled "'We Demand': History/Sex/Activism in Canada/Nous demandons: Histoire/Sexe/Activisme au Canada" was hosted on August 28, 2011, commemorating the forty year anniversary of the march.
