= University of Toronto Homophile Association =

First LGBTQ student organization in Canada

- Formation: 1969; 57 years ago
- Founder: Jearld Moldenhauer
- Founded at: University of Toronto
- Dissolved: 1973; 53 years ago
- Type: Student organization
- Location: Toronto, Ontario, Canada
- Key people: Jearld Moldenhauer; Bill McRay; Ian Young; Charlie Hill; Disa Rosen

The University of Toronto Homophile Association (UTHA) was Canada's first gay and lesbian student organization, and one of the first gay liberation organizations in the country. Founded in 1969 at the University of Toronto, the UTHA paved the way for similar student groups across the province of Ontario and led to the establishment of the Community Homophile Association of Toronto.

== History ==
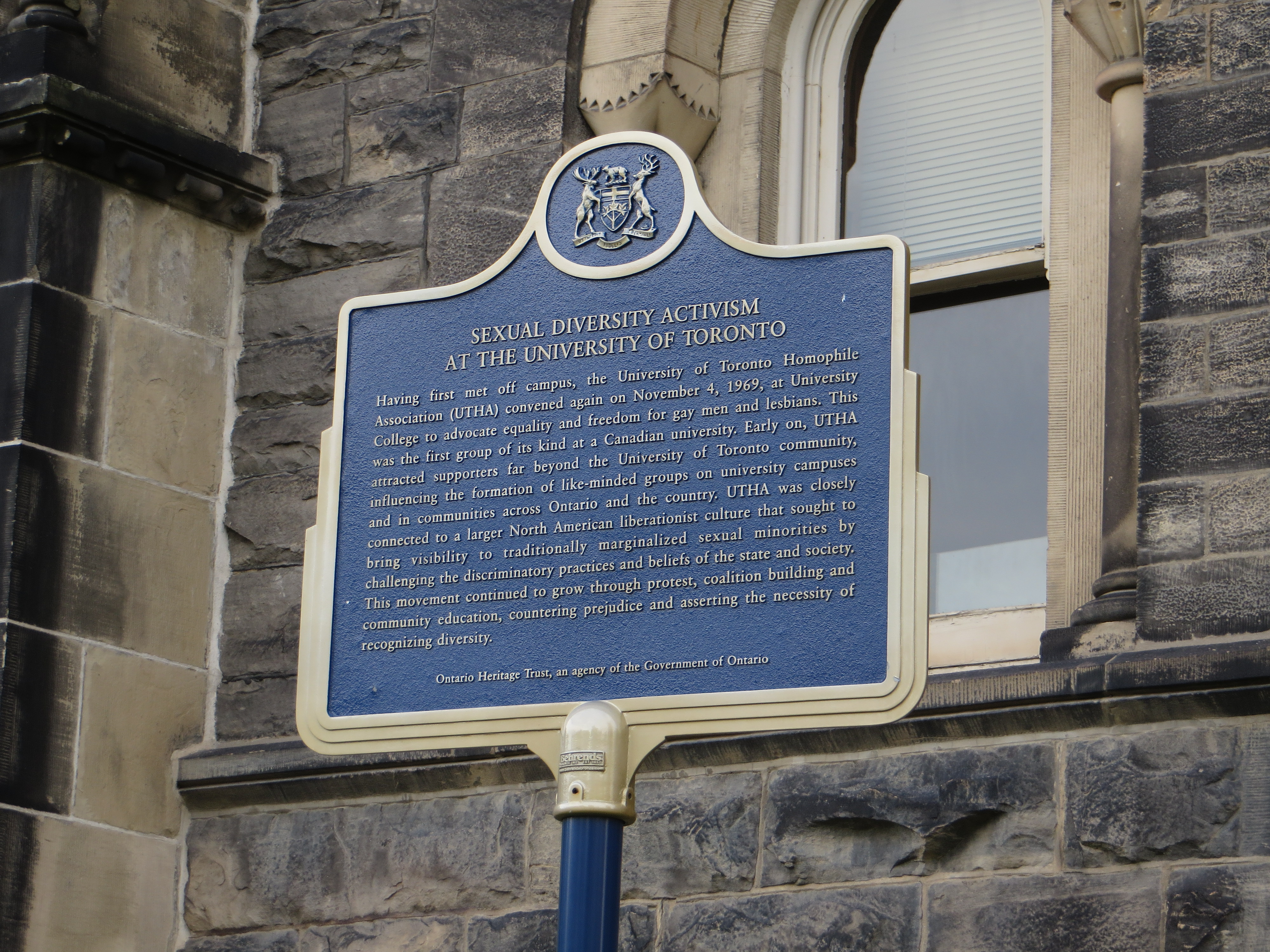
Ontario Heritage plaque at University College honouring the UTHA and sexual diversity activism at the University of Toronto

Founded in 1969, the University of Toronto Homophile Association served as Canada's first gay and lesbian student group. It started from an ad that founder Jearld Moldenhauer placed in The Varsity, and had its first meeting off-campus. The UTHA held its first official public gathering at University College on the St. George campus on November 4, 1969. Within a month, the UTHA registered under the Students' Administrative Council of the University of Toronto and became an official student organization.

The UTHA's office was located at 12 Hart House Circle and regular meetings would be held in the Graduate Student's Union. By the end of 1969, the UTHA had 45 members. The group's early members included Jearld Moldenhauer, Bill McRay, Ian Young, Charlie Hill, and Disa Rosen. Charlie Hill was appointed as the UTHA's first chair, and was eventually succeeded by Ian Young.

Its founder, Jearld Moldenhauer, was expelled from the University of Toronto in 1970 after he publicly defended the organization.

Soon after the UTHA was established, it became apparent that the organization had wide appeal and interest from queer people outside of the university community. This need for a queer Toronto-based community group eventually led to the founding of the Community Homophile Association of Toronto in 1971. The University of Toronto's queer student organization LGBTOUT traces its roots to UTHA.

== Activities ==
The University of Toronto Homophile Association's activities centered around educating the community about homosexuality, combatting legal discrimination against homosexuality, and bringing about social and personal acceptance towards homosexuality. The group's activities included weekly discussion groups, public forums with invited guests, research, political advocacy, referral services, and social events.

UTHA speakers included guests like Franklin Kameny, Thomas Szasz, Michael Lynch, and John Herbert. Members of the UTHA also gave talks on homosexuality to student groups and high schools. The UTHA offered informal counselling services run by volunteers, which would deal with personal, psychological, religious, social, and legal questions. The association also hosted dances on and off campus.

== Legacy ==
An Ontario Heritage Trust plaque was placed on the east side of University College in honour of the UTHA and the sexual diversity movement at the University of Toronto. It was commemorated by the University of Toronto Sexual and Gender Diversity Office and then-president David Naylor.

== See also ==
- LGBTQ student movement
