= Chris Bearchell =

Canadian LGBT activist (1953–2007)

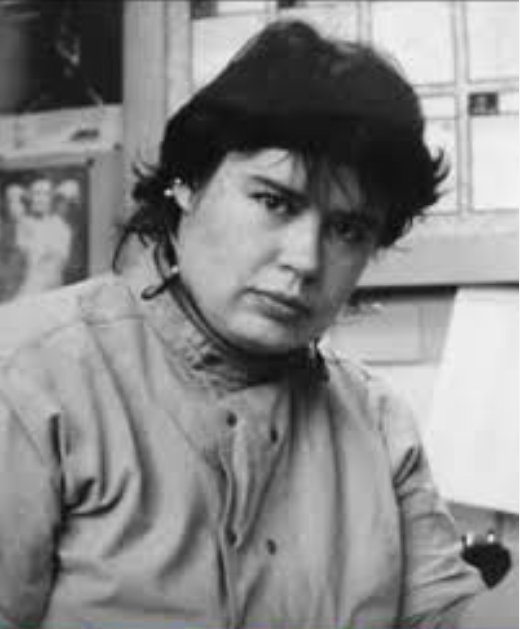
- Born: Christine Bearchell; August 16, 1953; Edmonton, Alberta, Canada
- Died: February 18, 2007 (aged 53); Vancouver, British Colombia, Canada
- Movement: Gay liberation
- Honours: Induction to CGLA National Portrait Gallery, 2003

Christine (Chris) Bearchell (August 16, 1953 – February 18, 2007) was a Canadian gay liberation activist and right to privacy advocate. Between 1976 and 1987, she was a regular contributor to The Body Politic. During her time living in Toronto from 1975 to 1995, she co-founded or was a leading member of several organizations, including Canadian Lesbian and Gay Rights of Ontario and Maggie's Toronto Sex Workers Action Project. She also participated in the protests against Operation Soap.

== Early life ==
Bearchell was born in Edmonton, Alberta, in 1953. She was the eldest daughter of Julia Battersby and Ben Bearchell, and had one younger brother and two younger sisters. Bearchell attended Jasper Place High School, where she was a captain of the debate team and successfully lobbied for the repeal of a dress code requiring girls to wear skirts. She left home at the age of 15 to live with another woman. As a teenager, she participated in the anti-Vietnam War movement and the Campaign to Defend Dr. Henry Morgentaler. She moved to Toronto, Ontario, in 1975.

== Activism ==
Bearchell was involved in organizing for multiple causes in Toronto between 1975 and 1995. Her causes included gay liberation, lesbian rights, sex workers' rights, privacy rights, anti-censorship, HIV/AIDS, and abortion rights. Bearchell was also a member of the League for Socialist Action, a Trotskyist organization.

=== Gay liberation ===
Bearchell was an important figure in the gay liberation movement in Canada. She spoke about their goals as organizing people in opposition to homophobic discrimination and bringing them out of the closet in greater numbers, as a necessary condition for the creation of a gay community and political movement.

Bearchell first became involved in activism in Toronto by organizing the lesbian workshop of the Ontario Federation of Student Women Conference in 1974, and shortly afterward joined the Gay Alliance Toward Equality (GATE). She served on the executive committee of GATE and in February 1975, was chosen as the chairperson of the Committee to Defend John Damien, a gay horse racing steward who had been fired by the Ontario Racing Commission.

She was briefly involved with the media-focused Gay Offensive Collective and helped produce the public access television show This Show May Be Offensive to Heterosexuals. The show consisted primarily of humorous satirical segments, and ran from September 21, 1978, to early 1979 on Rogers Cable.

Bearchell was also an early member of the Lesbian Organization of Toronto (LOOT).

==== Coalition for Lesbian and Gay Rights of Ontario ====
In the year 1975, Chris Bearchell co-founded the Coalition for Lesbian and Gay Rights of Ontario (CLRGO), then called the Coalition for Gay Rights in Ontario. She helped prepare "The Ontario Human Rights Omission", a brief presented to the Ontario MPPs which included detailed incidents in discrimination for housing and employment against gays and lesbians.

==== The Body Politic ====
Bearchell began writing for The Body Politic in 1975, becoming its first woman writer. She had a column called "Dykes" and wrote about lesbian issues. In 1978, she helped lead a campaign to defend the paper against criminal indecency charges. Also in 1978, she joined the paper's governing collective.

==== Operation Soap ====
They think that when they pick on us that they’re picking on the weakest. Well, they made a mistake this time. We’re going to show them just how strong we are. They can’t get away with this shit anymore. No more shit!

— Chris Bearchell, at the Feb. 6 protest against Operation Soap.

Bearchell participated in the February 6, 1981, protest against the mass arrests conducted by Toronto Police the previous night during Operation Soap. Bearchell gave a speech to the gathered protesters at the corner of Yonge and Wellesley in Toronto's Gay Village, and was reportedly the one to start the chant "No more shit!", which became a prominent slogan in the community response to Operation Soap.

=== Sex workers' rights ===
Beginning in the 1980s, Bearchell began organizing in the sex workers' rights movement. In 1983, she was a founding member of the Canadian Organization for the Rights of Prostitutes (CORP) along with Peggie Lee, Danny Cockerline, Feather, and Gwendolyn. This organization advocated for the decriminalization of sex work, spoke out against the prosecution of those involved in sex work, and provided advice and support to sex workers facing criminal charges. Between 1990 and 1991, the organization also published a newsletter, Stiletto. After Bill C-49 was passed in December 1985, CORP organized to challenge the constitutionality of the law. During the period of 1986 to 1991, Bearchell was one of the activists "at the helm of CORP's efforts for decriminalization". CORP was disbanded in 1992 and most of its members left to form the Sex Workers' Alliance of Toronto.

In 1986, Bearchell helped found the Safe Sex CORPS, which was renamed the Prostitutes Safe Sex Project and is now known as Maggie's, a drop-in and advocacy organization for sex workers that was funded by the government. In 1990, Bearchell became the organization's coordinator after the previous coordinator, her close friend and collaborator Danny Cockerline, stepped down.

== Personal life ==
In the 1970s, Bearchell was in a non-monogamous relationship with activist Konnie Reich. On April 10, 1976, the couple was assaulted while walking in The Annex neighborhood of Toronto.

In 1984, Bearchell began a relationship with Irit Shimrat, another activist. Shimrat published a magazine for former psychiatric patients, Phoenix Rising, out of the basement of their shared home, and helped Bearchell launch a new magazine, Epicene, after The Body Politic folded in 1987.

Bearchell also worked at the headquarters of Girl Guides in the mid-1970s.

Bearchell was featured in the 2002 documentary film, Stand Together: A History of the Lesbian and Gay Rights Movement in Ontario from 1967 to 1987 by Nancy Nicol.

In October 2003, a portrait of Bearchell was placed in the Canadian Lesbian Gay Archives National Portrait Collection.

== Death ==
In 1995, Bearchell moved from Toronto to Lasqueti Island in British Colombia. Two years later, in 1997, Bearchell was diagnosed with breast cancer. After a ten-year illness, she died at Vancouver General Hospital on February 18, 2007. She was 53 years old at the time of her death. Bearchell's death was marked by obituaries in Xtra!, Now Magazine, and The Globe and Mail, with other prominent Canadian LGBT activists sharing their recollections of her. A memorial service was held at The 519 in Toronto, and was attended by "a veritable who's who of queer activism" in the city. The LGBTQ2S ArQuives in Toronto holds a collection of Bearchell’s belongings.
