= Michael Bronski =

American academic and writer (born 1949)

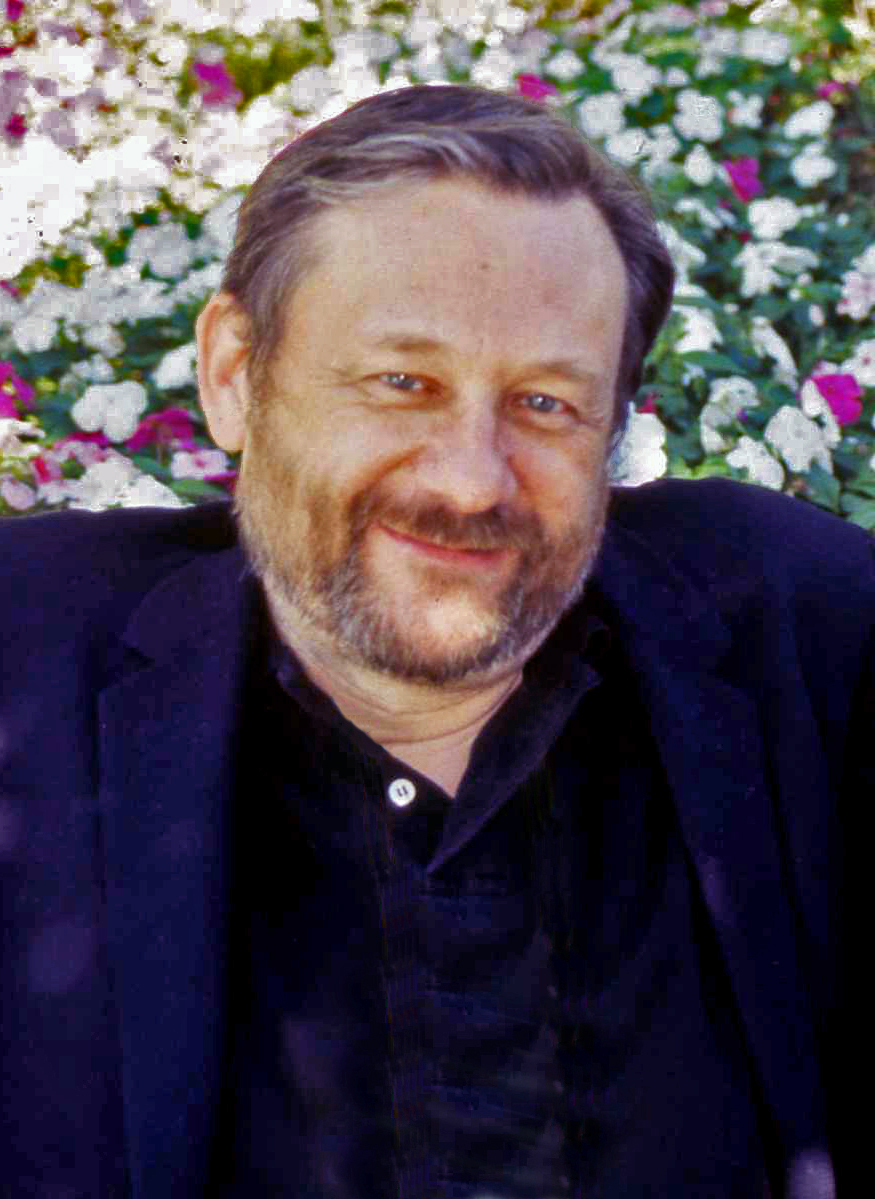
- Michael Bronski in September 2000
- Born: May 12, 1949 (age 77)
- Occupations: Writer, historian
- Writing career
- Period: 1980s–present
- Subject: LGBT history
- Notable work: A Queer History of the United States
- Website: wgs.fas.harvard.edu/people/michael-bronski

Michael Bronski (born May 12, 1949) is an American academic and writer, best known for his 2011 book A Queer History of the United States. He has been involved with LGBT politics since 1969 as an activist and organizer. He has won numerous awards for LGBTQ activism and scholarship, including the prestigious Publishing Triangle's Bill Whitehead Award for Lifetime Achievement. Bronski is a professor of Practice in Media and Activism at Harvard University.

== Career ==
Since 1970, Bronski has published works on culture, politics, film, theater, books, sexuality, LGBT culture, and current events. As a journalist, cultural critic and political commentator he has been published in a wide array of venues including Gay Community News (Boston), The Village Voice, The Boston Globe, GLQ, The Los Angeles Times, The Boston Phoenix, Cinéaste, Contemporary Women's Writing, Time, The Nation, and the Boston Review. His scholarship includes more than 50 essays in anthologies on LGBTQ culture and politics.

He was an original member of Fag Rag Collective from 1971 to 1998 and the Good Gay Poets Collective. He was a founding member of the Boston Gay Review. He acted as program coordinator for OutWrite: Lesbian and Gay Literary Conference for five years in the 1990s.

Bronski was awarded the 1995 AIDS Action Committee Community Recognition Award for 20 years of journalism on gay and AIDS-related topics. In 1996, he received the Cambridge Lavender Alliance Lifetime Achievement Award for journalism and political organizing.

Bronski was featured in the BBC's Stage Struck: Gay Theater in the Twentieth Century (1999), PBS's After Stonewall (1999), Cinemax's The Hidden Führer: Debating the Enigma of Hitler's Sexuality (2004), and Wrangler: Anatomy of an Icon (2008).

In 1999, the Anderson Prize Foundation granted Bronski the Stonewall Award in recognition for "helping improve the lives and LGBT people in the United States."

A Queer History of the United States won both a Lambda Literary Award and a Stonewall Book Award in 2012. He also previously won two Lambda Literary Awards as an editor of anthologies, in 1997 for Taking Liberties: Gay Men's Essays on Politics, Culture, & Sex and in 2004 for Pulp Friction: Uncovering the Golden Age of Gay Male Pulps.

Bronski consulted on LGBT content and analyzed focus group results for MTV/Logo in 2014 and wrote ten biographies of noted LGBT historical figures for the MTV/Logo June Pride Month programming in 2017.

In 2017, he was the recipient of the Publishing Triangle's prestigious Bill Whitehead Award for Lifetime Achievement. Previous awardees included Audre Lorde, Martin Duberman, and Alison Bechdel.

He was a senior lecturer in Women's and Gender Studies and in Jewish Studies at Dartmouth College, where he was granted the 2008 Distinguished Lecturer Award and 2004 Leadership Award from the Dartmouth Gay and Lesbian Alumni Association. He is currently Professor of the Practice in Media and Activism in the Studies of Women, Gender, and Sexuality at Harvard University.

== Personal life ==
Bronski has resided in Cambridge, Massachusetts, since 1971. He was the partner of American poet Walta Borawski, who died in 1994.

== Published works ==
=== Books ===
- Culture Clash: The Making of Gay Sensibility (South End Press, 1984)
- The Pleasure Principle: Sex, Backlash and the Struggle for Gay Freedom (St. Martin's Press, 1998)
- Pulp Friction: Uncovering the Golden Age of Gay Male Pulps (St. Martin's Press, 2003)
- A Queer History of the United States (Beacon Press, 2011)
- You can tell just by looking: and 20 other myths about LGBT life and people (co-authored with Ann Pellegrini and Michael Amico, Beacon Press, 2013)
- Considering Hate: Violence, Goodness, and Justice in American Culture and Politics (co-authored with Kay Whitlock, Beacon Press, 2015)
- A Queer History of the United States for Young People (Beacon Press, Boston, 2019)

=== Edited publications ===
- Taking Liberties: Gay Men’s Essays on Politics, Culture, & Sex (Editor, Masquerade Books, New York, 1996)
- Out-Standing Lives: Profiles of Lesbians and Gay Men. (Advisory Editor, Visible Ink, 1997.)
- Gay and Lesbian Biography (Advisory Editor, Gale Research, 1997)
- Flashpoint: Gay Male Sexual Writing (Editor, Masquerade Books, New York, 1997)
- Queer Ideas/ Queer Action series (Beacon Press, 2007–2013)
- Lesbian, Gay, Bisexual and Transgender History: Critical Readings Vol. 1-4 (Bloomsbury, 2019)
