= Gerald Hannon =

Canadian journalist (1944–2022)

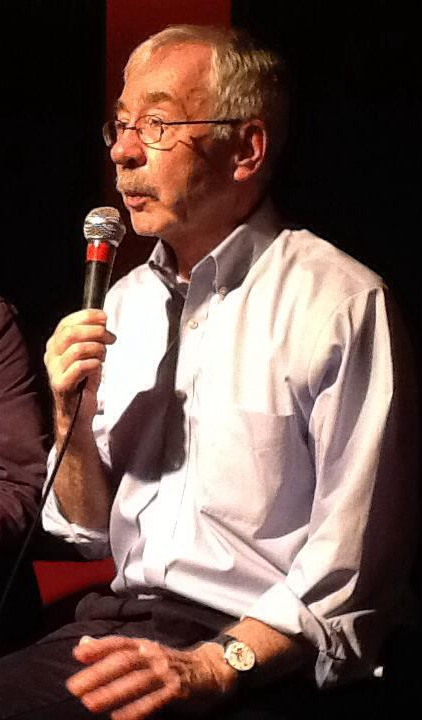
- Hannon speaking in 2013
- Born: July 10, 1944; Bathurst, New Brunswick, Canada
- Died: May 9, 2022 (aged 77); Toronto, Ontario, Canada
- Occupation: Journalist
- Writing career
- Period: 1970s–2022

Gerald Hannon (July 10, 1944 – May 9, 2022) was a Canadian journalist whose work appeared in major Canadian magazines and newspapers.

Hannon gained fame as a result of references to pedophilia in his article "Men Loving Boys Loving Men" (1977), published in the now-defunct The Body Politic. Hannon was acquitted of obscenity charges laid in connection with the article. He was later the subject of media controversy in 1995, when several mainstream journalists attacked Ryerson University for employing him as a journalism instructor while he was simultaneously, and openly, working as a male prostitute.

== Background ==
Hannon was born in Bathurst, New Brunswick, in 1944, and moved with his family to Marathon, Ontario, at age 3. His father was emotionally and physically abusive, and his mother would later come out as lesbian.

He later moved to Toronto, Ontario, completing high school at St. Michael's College.

== The Body Politic ==
In 1972, Hannon joined the editorial group that produced the Toronto LGBT magazine The Body Politic, and was one of its most prolific writers.

In the magazine's November 1977 issue, Hannon published an article titled "Men Loving Boys Loving Men", a profile of three men who were having sexual relationships with underage males. The article contained sentences like "Boy-love is not child molestation," which provoked a backlash. That December, Toronto Sun journalist Claire Hoy began publishing columns attacking Hannon and The Body Politic for promoting child abuse.

The magazine's offices were raided by Toronto police on December 30, 1977. Twelve boxes of material, including the magazine's subscription lists, were taken.

On January 5, 1978, the paper and its publishers were charged under section 164 of the Criminal Code with "use of the mails to distribute immoral, indecent or scurrilous material". The case reached trial on January 2, 1979, with prosecution testimony by Hoy and Ken Campbell. In six days of testimony, only one piece of documentary evidence—a copy of the issue containing Hannon's article—was presented to the court.

On February 14, The Body Politic was acquitted of the charges.

On May 31, 1982, the appeal hearing on the criminal charges began, and on June 15, the magazine was acquitted a second time. On July 13, the Crown appealed again. That appeal was rejected.

== Ryerson University ==
The Body Politic ceased publication in 1987, a few years after its publisher (now incorporated as Pink Triangle Press) launched the tabloid Xtra!. Hannon became a freelance journalist. He has won thirteen National Magazine Awards as a freelancer, among them for profiles of Tomson Highway and John Bentley Mays and for a Toronto Life article titled "The Alchemy of Pork Fat". He also occasionally worked as a sex worker, and was employed as a part-time journalism instructor at Ryerson University.

On July 8, 1994, Hannon reviewed Judy Steed's book Our Little Secret in Xtra!, asserting that the book's portrayal of child abuse bordered on homophobia.

On March 11, 1995, The Globe and Mail published Hannon's "The Kiddie Porn Ring That Wasn't", an investigative piece on "Project Guardian", an operation led by then-London, Ontario police chief Julian Fantino into an alleged child pornography ring. The investigation resulted in the arrest of 45 gay men, but the alleged child pornography in fact involved not children but male hustlers older than the legal age of consent. Only two people were ever arrested on pornography charges, while all of the other defendants were charged with offenses unrelated to the stated purpose of the investigation, such as prostitution and drug-related charges. As a result, Hannon asserted that the investigation was merely a smokescreen for a homophobic witch hunt.

In May, Fantino filed a complaint with the Ontario Press Council against Hannon's article. On November 9, the press council ruled that the article should have been labelled an opinion piece.

On November 11, two days after the press council ruling, Steed, in a conference speech, attacked the chair of Ryerson's journalism program for employing Hannon as a part-time journalism instructor.

On November 14, Toronto Sun journalist Heather Bird alleged that Hannon had used the press council hearing as an opportunity to prosyletize pedophilia to his journalism students. Hannon responded by saying the only time he had ever broached the subject in the classroom was within the context of mentioning the obscenity trial within a discussion of journalistic ethics. Nine of Hannon's students wrote a joint letter to the editor agreeing with Hannon and criticizing what they called inaccuracies and false claims in Bird's column.

Ryerson's journalism school lab newspaper, the Ryersonian, interviewed Hannon's entire class. Even when offered anonymity, the students said Hannon had never done or said anything inappropriate in the class, and none agreed with Bird's characterization of Hannon's teaching methods.

Bird subsequently cited a passage in "Men Loving Boys Loving Men", in which Hannon described overhearing a conversation about child sex, and falsely characterized that passage as a personal confession of Hannon's actual participation in a child sex assault. Bird's claim sparked a police investigation that was dropped a few days later due to a lack of evidence.

Michael Valpy, one of Hannon's defenders in the press, wrote: "Mr. Hannon ... teaches in an adult setting whose purpose is to encourage debate, discussion and challenge. Does freedom to philosophize, however unpopular, necessarily undermine society and conventional morality? Or is a good society impossible without freedom to philosophize?"

== Prostitution ==
On November 25, 1995, the Toronto Sun ran an exposé on Hannon's occasional prostitution under the headline "Ryerson Prof: I'm a Hooker". Hannon acknowledged that he occasionally worked as a prostitute.

Ryerson suspended Hannon on November 26. The following day, the Canadian Union of Public Employees filed a grievance on Hannon's behalf, asserting that there were no grounds for a disciplinary enquiry since no staff or student of the university had complained about any inappropriate behaviour on Hannon's part. Ryerson reinstated Hannon for the winter semester and placed a letter of reprimand in his file, but did not renew his contract at the end of the school year. He has not taught at Ryerson since.

The spring 1996 issue of Ryerson Review of Journalism, published by the journalism school, ran an investigative piece on the Hannon controversy. The writers concluded the mainstream media's coverage of the Hannon affair was almost entirely based on falsehoods, distortions and selective application of facts.

In a February 1996 article in The Guardian, Hannon argued that adults introduced children to many of life's pleasures, and that there was no "a priori reason why we shouldn't introduce them to sex". In addition, he went on to say that while penetration "may be of little interest to most children... [i]t makes good educational sense to push a child's limits, much as we do in sports or academics, by requiring of them things they might at first feel incapable of doing".

A profile of Hannon in the June 1996 issue of Toronto Life by journalist Sandra Martin began "I've talked to dozens of people and I haven't found anybody who agrees with Gerald's ideas on pedophilia — and that includes Gerald." After grilling Hannon extensively on his sexual practices and confirming that he was interested in the subject of pedophilia purely as a philosophical debate, Martin concluded Hannon "refrains from sex with children not because he thinks it is morally or ethically taboo, but because it doesn't turn him on."

== Death ==
Hannon died on May 9, 2022, by medical assistance in dying (MAID), four years after being diagnosed with atypical Parkinson's disease.

His memoir, Immoral, Indecent & Scurrilous: The Making of an Unrepentant Sex Radical, was completed before his death and published in 2022.
