= John Mitzel =

American writer and publisher

John Mitzel (1948-October 4, 2013) was a Boston writer, publisher, bookseller, and gay community and cultural activist. His journals are located at The History Project in Boston, Massachusetts.

== Early activism ==
Born in Cincinnati, Ohio, and educated at Boston University, he was one of the organizers of Boston's first gay pride parade in 1971. Mitzel was a founding member of the Fag Rag collective in 1971 which published Fag Rag, and he helped found the Good Gay Poets collective in 1973. He wrote numerous articles for Gay Community News (Boston) and had a column in Philadelphia Gay News in the 1970s and 1980s. As a publisher, he started Manifest Destiny Press in the 1970s and Calamus Books in 2002.

== Boston-Boise Committee ==
In December 1977, Mitzel with other members of the Fag Rag collective organized the Boston-Boise committee largely in response to the alleged police entrapment of both Boston gay men and pedophiles.

Mitzel wrote a book detailing the events of what he called The Boston Sex Scandal. Several men were arrested in Suffolk County (Boston) for running what was at the time referred to as a 'boy sex ring' involving 'child prostitutes'. The men included an assistant headmaster and teacher from the Fessenden School, juvenile probation officer, Washington DC lobbyist, school bus driver, Boston Children's Hospital child psychologist and others were arrested as part of the ring. ( There were over 60 boys involved in the ring that had been operating since 1971. The arrest included confiscation of photos of children (nude) in the Mountain Ave. apartment of Richard Peluso as well as confessions of video taping children by Dr. Donald Allen, the child psychologist. District Attorney, Garrett Byrne, stated the men had traveled from around the country to access the boys and at least one of the boys had been used for pornographic films in Los Angeles. CA.

In April 1978, through Mitzel's acquaintance with him, Gore Vidal spoke at a fund-raiser for the committee, where Vidal advocated against age of consent laws and alleged statutory rape is an unreasonable identifier. The controversy that followed the event as well as allegations of misconduct led to the resignation of Massachusetts Supreme Court Judge Bonin who attended a fundraiser for the Revere defendants. The founding of GLAD and The North American Man Boy Love Association NAMBLA, a group that advocates for the rights of children to have sex with adults and the lowering of age of consent laws.

== Glad Day and Calamus ==
Mitzel operated the Boston branch of Toronto's Glad Day Bookshop for some fifteen years until about 2000. He then opened Calamus Books.

== Works and publications ==
- Myra and Gore : a new view of Myra Breckinridge and a candid interview with Gore Vidal : a book for Vidalophiles. Manifest Destiny. 1974.
- John Horne Burns : An Appreciative Biography. Manifest Destiny. 1974. ISBN 978-0914852018.
- A Short History of Modern Capitalism Through Its Ladies. Manifest Destiny. 1975.
- Sports and the Macho Male. Fag Rag. 1976.
- Mitzel's Skylines : A Memoir. Manifest Destiny. 1976.
- Some Short Stories About Nasty People I Don't Like. Manifest Destiny. 1977. ISBN 978-0914852032.
- The Boston Sex Scandal. Glad Day. 1980. ISBN 978-0915480159.
- Doubly Crost. Calamus. 2009. ISBN 978-0914852193.
- Inferno Heights. Calamus. 2009. ISBN 978-0914852186.
- Dead Enz : A Suspense. Calamus. 2011. ISBN 978-0914852155.
- Some Poems. Calamus. 2011. ISBN 978-0914852155.
- Last Gleamings. Calamus. 2013. ISBN 978-0914852247.
