= David Groff =

American poet and writer

David Groff (1957) is an American poet, writer, and independent editor.

== Biography ==
Groff graduated from the University of Iowa, with an MFA, and MA. He has taught at University of Iowa, Rutgers University, and NYU, and at William Paterson University.

For the last eleven years, he has worked with literary and popular novelists, memoirists, journalists, and scientists whose books have been published by Atria, Bantam, HarperCollins, Hyperion, Little Brown, Miramax, Putnam, St. Martin's, Wiley, and other publishers. For twelve years he was an editor at Crown Publishing.

Groff's work was published in American Poetry Review, Bloom, Chicago Review, Christopher Street, Confrontation, The Georgia Review, The Iowa Review, Men on Men 2, Men on Men 2000, Missouri Review, New York, North American Review, Northwest Review, Out, Poetry, Poetry Daily, Poetry Northwest, Poz, Prairie Schooner, QW, Self, 7 Days, 7 Carmine, and Wigwag.

Groff was awarded the Louise Bogan Award by the Lambda Literary Foundation in 2012 for his work, Clay.

He is currently an editor under the agency of Rob Weisbach Creative Management.

He is openly gay.

== Bibliography ==
- 2001 National Poetry Series, for Theory of Devolution

=== Poetry ===
- Theory of Devolution. University of Illinois Press. 2002. ISBN 978-0-252-07086-0.

=== Non-fiction ===
- Robin Hardy; David Groff (1999). The Crisis of Desire: AIDS and the Fate of Gay Brotherhood. Houghton Mifflin Harcourt. ISBN 978-0-395-74544-1. "David Groff."
- Michael Galluccio; Jon Galluccio; David Groff (2002). An American Family. Macmillan. ISBN 978-0-312-28887-7.
- Out facts: just about everything you need to know about gay and lesbian life. Universe Publishing. 1997. ISBN 978-0-7893-0083-6.
