= George Hislop =

Canadian politician and activist (1927–2005)

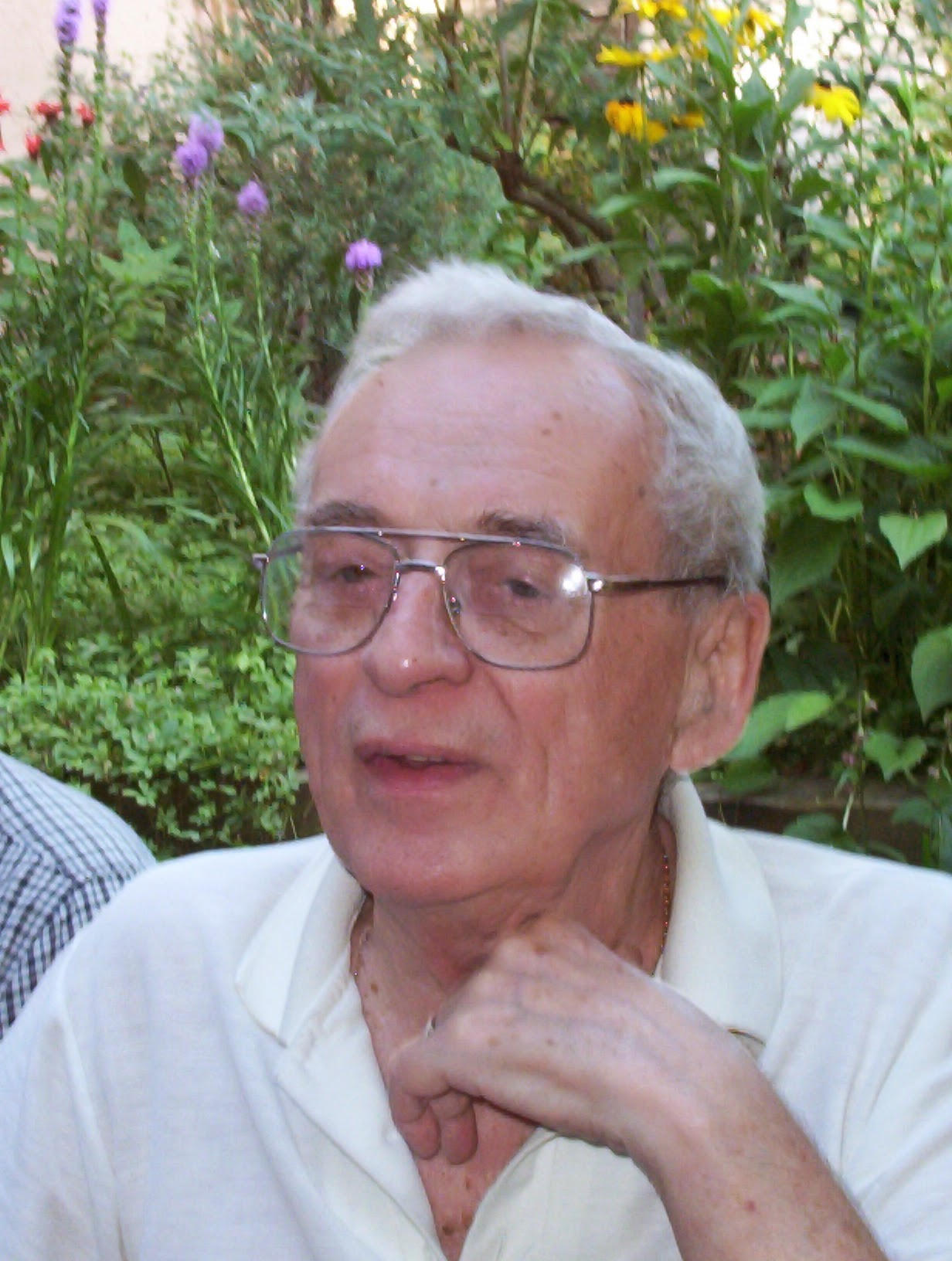
George Hislop in 2003

George Hislop (June 3, 1927 – October 8, 2005) was one of Canada's most influential gay activists. He was one of the earliest openly gay candidates for political office in Canada, and was a key figure in the early development of Toronto's gay community.

== Early career ==
Hislop studied speech and drama at the Banff School of Fine Arts, graduating in 1949. He subsequently worked as an actor and operated an interior design company with his partner, Ron Shearer. Hislop met Shearer in 1958 and the couple remained together until Shearer's death in 1986.

== Activism ==
In 1971, Hislop co-founded the Community Homophile Association of Toronto, one of Canada's first organizations for gays and lesbians. On August 28, 1971, he was also an organizer of We Demand, the first Canadian gay rights demonstration on Parliament Hill. He later played a significant role as a contact between one of the killers and the police in the Emanuel Jaques murder case in 1977.

== Elections ==
In 1980, Hislop ran for Toronto City Council. He won the support of then-Mayor John Sewell, a move that contributed to Sewell's defeat. The Toronto Police Association openly campaigned against both Sewell and Hislop in the election. The following year, Hislop ran in the 1981 provincial election as an independent candidate in St. George to protest against the 1981 Toronto bathhouse raids, also known as Operation Soap. Hislop had been charged as a result of these raids, as part-owner of the Barracks bathhouse. He placed fourth in the election with 2,677 votes (9.3% of the total).

Track Two (Enough Is Enough), a 1982 documentary film about Operation Soap, was first initiated as a film about Hislop's campaign for city council, evolving into a portrait of the protest movement when the raids occurred just a few months after Hislop's defeat.

Through the 1980s and 1990s, Hislop remained active as a business owner and activist.

== Later life ==
In 2003, Hislop was nominated for the Order of Ontario by George Smitherman.

Also that year, Hislop was one of several gay activists who launched a class action lawsuit against the federal government. The government had extended Canada Pension Plan benefits to the surviving same-sex partners of deceased pensioners as of 1998, but the change was not retroactive to earlier deaths. Shearer had died in 1986, making Hislop ineligible for survivor benefits. The suit aimed to have retroactive benefits extended back to the 1985 inclusion of gay and lesbian equality rights in the Charter of Rights and Freedoms. On November 26, 2004, the lawsuit ended in victory for Hislop and his co-plaintiffs, although the federal government subsequently filed a controversial appeal of the decision. The federal government lost this appeal on March 1, 2007, when the Supreme Court ruled in Hislop's favour.

Also in 2004, Hislop was the grand marshal of Toronto's Pride parade.

In 2005, Hislop was the first-ever recipient of the International Lesbian and Gay Law Association's Karl Heinrich Ulrichs Award in honour of his contributions to the advancement of LGBT equality in Canada. He was cited by federal New Democratic Party leader Jack Layton as an important influence on Layton's support of LGBT issues; they had become friends after Hislop beat Layton as representative of Ward 6 in the 1980 municipal election. In August of 2005, Hislop received his first pension cheque under the 2004 court decision.

The Toronto Star reported that Hislop, who had diabetes, Parkinson's disease, and esophageal cancer, died on October 8, 2005, in Toronto Grace Hospital. In an obituary notice, Eye Weekly referred to Hislop as "the unofficial mayor of the Toronto gay community".

In October 2005, one week after his death, Hislop was posthumously awarded the inaugural Jonathan R. Steinert and Fernando G. Ferreiro Award, Canada's largest award for contributions to LGBT communities. The $12,500 award, established by the Lesbian and Gay Community Appeal Foundation, was given to Hislop's estate.

A park in the city's Church and Wellesley neighbourhood is also named in Hislop's honour. In honour of his role as a significant builder of LGBT culture and history in Canada, a portrait of Hislop by artist Norman Hatton is held by The ArQuives' National Portrait Collection.
