= Community Homophile Association of Toronto =

Defunct Canadian gay and lesbian association

The Community Homophile Association of Toronto (CHAT) was founded on January 3, 1971. The organization grew out of the University of Toronto Homophile Association (UTHA). CHAT's work centered around providing support services, education, and organizing community events for Toronto's gay and lesbian community. The organization's activities were driven by its "central plank to come out of the state of fear and apprehension which surrounds the public assertion of one’s rights of sexuality", with a secondary aim to achieve equal civil rights to those of heterosexuals. In 1977, CHAT disbanded due to economic challenges and declining membership. A number of gay and lesbian groups grew out of CHAT, including Toronto Gay Action (TGA) and Lesbian Organization of Toronto (LOOT).

== History ==
Finding its roots in the University of Toronto Homophile Association (UTHA), the Community Homophile Association of Toronto (CHAT) was formally established on January 3, 1971. As a result of growing community interest in UTHA events, the need for a Toronto-based gay and lesbian community organization became apparent to UTHA members. In February 1971, CHAT held its first public meeting at the Church of the Holy Trinity, which was attended by approximately 50 people. CHAT's first Board of Directors was elected in March 1972, and included George Hislop, Patricia Murphy, Clive Bell, Kathleen Brindley and 6 other members. By 1972, CHAT had 400 paying members, and by 1974, the organization was incorporated.

Soon after CHAT was established, it received a $9000 federal grant from the Opportunities for Youth Project. The grant allowed CHAT to offer counselling services, set up a 24-hour distress line and provide legal, medical and psychiatric referral information to the public. Once funds from the grant ran out, these services continued through the work of volunteers. CHAT later applied for the Local Initiatives Program Grant, which was initially rejected. With the support from the Ontario Mental Hospital, the Clarke Institute of Psychiatry and distress centres in and around Toronto, CHAT was awarded the grant of $14,602 with an extension. The funds were used to hire 8 staff members to staff the distress phone lines.

In the fall of 1971, CHAT established Canada's first gay community center at 58 Cecil Street. This building housed CHAT's offices, events, counselling phone lines, drop in sessions and dances. It also served as the site for many of Toronto's first Gay Pride Week events, including a panel discussion and art exhibit, and was the point of departure for the Toronto's first gay pride march in 1972. This unsanctioned march was attended by approximately 300 people, who marched up Toronto's University Avenue.

On August 28, 1971, CHAT along with TGA organized the We Demand Rally on Parliament Hill in Ottawa, protesting for equal rights for homosexuals as well as against the Royal Canadian Mounted Police's surveillance on gay men and lesbians in the military and civil service, unfair divorce laws and the immigration act banning gay men from entering and immigrating to Canada, among other issues.

In 1972, CHAT organized the "Homosexuality: Myth & Reality" panel, which was held at the St. Lawrence Centre Town Hall. The event was moderated by Barbara Frum and included panelists A.K. Gigeroff, Sidney Katz, Kathleen Brindley, George Hislop and Herb Spiers. The event was interrupted when 2 members of the right-wing Western Guard Party sprayed the 450 attendees with tear gas. The following day, a molotov cocktail was thrown into the CHAT Community Centre.

In 1973, CHAT's community center was relocated to 201 Church Street, while its administrative and counselling offices moved to 223 Church Street.

In 1977, CHAT disbanded due to declining membership and economic challenges.

== Activities ==
CHAT provided support services through counselling phone lines and drop in sessions. The organization regularly organized community events, from discussion groups, guest speakers, dances, coffee sessions and women's nights. CHAT established a resource library, where reference material on a variety of subjects were made available to the public.

== Challenges ==
In addition to ongoing economic challenges, CHAT experienced internal divisions that led to the emergence of groups including Toronto Gay Action (TGA) and Lesbian Organization of Toronto (LOOT). Toronto Gay Action originated as the activist caucus within CHAT. However, growing tensions between those who believed that the organization should focus on political reform, rather than social services, eventually led to the establishment of Toronto Gay Action as an independent group in 1971.

In 1971, a group of lesbian CHAT members, self identifying as The Cunts, made a statement to the CHAT members demanding that they confront their sexism and raise their consciousness.

In 1972, CHAT social service staff and 4 board members, including vice-president Patricia Murphy, resigned from their roles in protest of George Hislop's sexism and authoritarian management style.

In October 1976, a meeting of approximately 50 women was held at CHAT to set up a task force to establish a lesbian-only group. This task force eventually led to the founding of the Lesbian Organization of Toronto (LOOT).
