= The Body Politic =

Early LGBT magazine in Canada (1971 to 1987)

- The Body Politic (Issue 1, November–December 1971, Toronto)
- Categories: LGBT
- Frequency: Monthly
- Publisher: Pink Triangle Press
- Founder: Jearld Moldenhauer
- First issue: November 1, 1971
- Final issue: February 1987
- Country: Canada
- Based in: Toronto, Ontario
- Language: English

The Body Politic was a Canadian monthly magazine which was published from 1971 to 1987. It was one of Canada's first significant gay publications, and played a prominent role in the development of the LGBT community in Canada.

== History ==
The magazine was first published on November 1, 1971, by an informal collective operating out of the home of Glad Day Bookshop owner Jearld Moldenhauer. Many members of the collective had been associated with the underground publication Guerilla, which had been relatively gay-friendly but alienated some of its LGBT contributors when it altered Moldenhauer's article about the We Demand Rally of August 28, 1971. At a September meeting of the Toronto Gay Alliance, Moldenhauer proposed the idea of launching a gay-focused publication. Names considered for the magazine included Mandala and Radical Pervert.

In 1973, the publication ran into difficulty with the Toronto Star, which refused to print an advertisement for the magazine because of its policy of refusing to accept ads relating to sexual activity. While the magazine won an Ontario Press Council ruling that the Star's refusal of the ad had been discriminatory, the Star retaliated by discontinuing The Body Politic's printing contract with its commercial printing subsidiary Newsweb Enterprises.

The magazine's editorial collective also created the Canadian Lesbian and Gay Archives in 1973.

The collective was incorporated as Pink Triangle Press in 1975. In that same year, the magazine ran into minor legal difficulties when an installment of cartoonist Rand Holmes' Harold Hedd strip depicted an act of fellatio.

The Body Politic was twice charged with publishing obscene material, in 1977 for Gerald Hannon's article "Men Loving Boys Loving Men", and in 1982 for "Lust with a Very Proper Stranger", an article on fisting. The police raid associated with the first charge sparked international protests, especially to the police's seizure of the magazine's subscriber list—Harvey Milk was one of the organizers of a protest at the Canadian consulate in San Francisco against the action. The magazine was ultimately acquitted in both trials, although materials seized by police in the Hannon trial were not returned to the magazine until 1985.

In 1977 and 1978, the magazine was involved in the production of Gay News and Views, an LGBT magazine series on Toronto cable.

In 1982, Toronto City Councillor Joe Piccininni failed in an attempt to have the magazine barred from the city council's press gallery, following a cover story on the Sisters of Perpetual Indulgence which Piccininni deemed disrespectful to Roman Catholicism. In this era, the magazine also became noted for its coverage of the emergence of HIV and AIDS.

The magazine ceased publication in 1987, following Pink Triangle Press's launch of the tabloid Xtra! in 1984.

== Legacy ==
Xtra! expanded in 1993 to launch sister editions Xtra! West in Vancouver and Capital Xtra! in Ottawa. All three publications remained in print until 2015, when Pink Triangle Press discontinued the print publications, but remain in operation today as the online magazine Daily Xtra.

In 2008, The Body Politic was ranked as the 17th most influential magazine in Canadian publishing history by Masthead, the trade magazine of the Canadian magazine publishing industry.

Body Politic, a historical play by Nick Green about the magazine and its role in the early gay liberation movement, premiered at Buddies in Bad Times in May 2016 and won the Dora Mavor Moore Award for Outstanding New Play in 2017, as well as an Oustanding Female Performance - General Theatre nomination for Diane Flacks.

The magazine's launch is profiled as a key moment in Canadian LGBTQ history in Noam Gonick's 2025 documentary film Parade: Queer Acts of Love and Resistance.

== Contributors ==
Writers associated with the magazine included Gerald Hannon, Rick Bébout, Chris Bearchell, Hugh Brewster, Stan Persky, Michael Lynch, Stephen O. Murray, John Greyson, David Rayside, Herbert Spiers, Ian Young, Ed Jackson, Sue Golding, Robin Hardy, Richard Summerbell, Thomas Waugh, John Alan Lee, Tim McCaskell, and Gary Kinsman.
