= Gay Alliance Toward Equality =

Gay liberation organization in Canada

- Abbreviation: GATE
- Formation: 1971
- Founder: Maurice Flood
- Founded at: Vancouver, British Columbia
- Dissolved: 1980

The Gay Alliance Toward Equality (GATE), was one of the first gay liberation groups in Canada.

Formed in spring 1971 in Vancouver, British Columbia, by Maurice Flood, GATE was the first Canadian gay group to explicitly discuss and plan civil rights strategies for achieving gay and lesbian equality under Canadian law. Autonomous groups with the same name were subsequently set up in other cities in Canada, including Edmonton and Toronto; in some cities, the local GATE chapter was the first locally oriented LGBT organization to be established.

One of the first high-profile cases launched for gay rights in Canada was launched by the Vancouver chapter of GATE in response to the Vancouver Sun's refusal to allow a paid advertisement for the GATE newspaper, Gay Tide. This became the first gay rights case to reach the Supreme Court of Canada, although the judges ruled 6-3 in favour of the Vancouver Sun.

Other prominent activities taken on by the group included picketing various human rights commissions over the lack of human rights protection for sexual orientation under Canadian law, and taking on an advocacy role in the wrongful dismissal suit of John Damien when the Ontario Racing Commission fired him as a racing steward because of his sexuality. GATE also organized the first pride protest in Vancouver, holding a picnic and art exhibit on August 1, 1973. Vancouver pride events, including the Vancouver Pride Parade, are still celebrated on or near this date.

The Toronto group led a successful campaign in 1973 to lobby Toronto City Council to adopt a policy forbidding discrimination on the basis of sexual orientation in municipal hiring, making the city the first jurisdiction in Canada to do so.

In its later years, GATE also undertook some activities as a political party. One activist, Robert Douglas Cook, ran as a GATE candidate in British Columbia's 1979 provincial election, in the electoral district of West Vancouver-Howe Sound. He has been credited by media sources in the past as the first openly gay candidate ever to run for political office in Canadian history; however, he was actually the first to run as a candidate of a specifically gay-identified political organization, and was preceded by at least two openly gay candidates for traditional political parties and at least four openly gay candidates for non-partisan municipal offices.

GATE dissolved in 1980.

== See also ==
- LGBTQ rights in Canada
- List of LGBTQ rights organisations
