= Toronto Women's Bookstore =

Feminist bookstore in Canada

Coordinates: 43.6627915°N 79.4027941°W

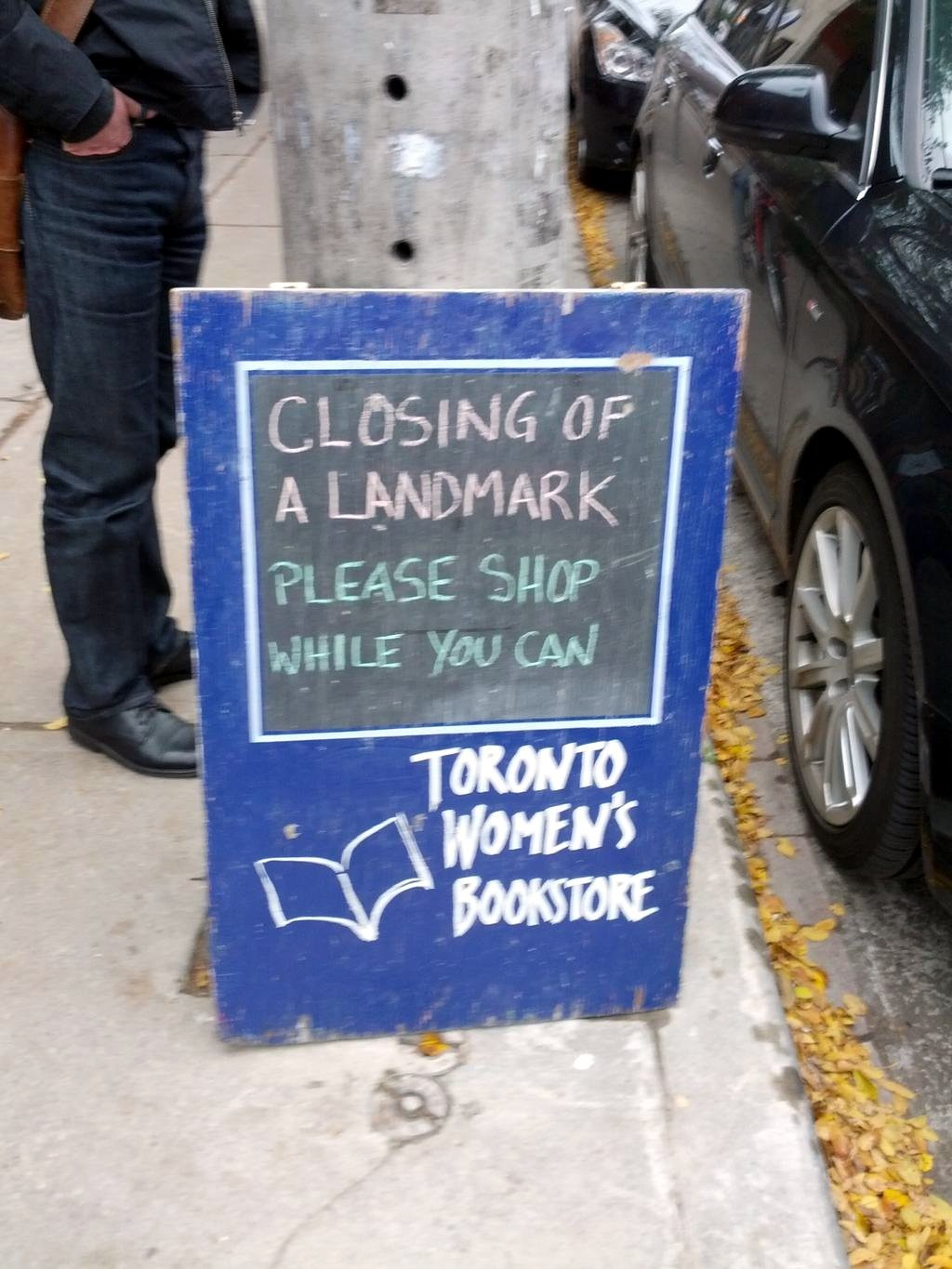
A chalk A-frame sign in October 2012 announcing the closure of the bookstore

The Toronto Women's Bookstore was the largest nonprofit, feminist bookstore in Canada, before its closure in November 2012. It was run and staffed primarily by women of colour, and sold fiction, poetry and non-fiction by women writers to promote feminist and anti-oppression politics.

== History ==
The bookstore informally began as a single shelf of books in a women's resource centre on Dupont Street in the early 1970s, and opened as a bookstore in 1973 at a site in Kensington Market, where it was associated with a feminist printing press and a self-defence collective.

The bookstore was nearly destroyed on July 29, 1983, in an accidental firebombing which was actually intended to attack the neighbouring abortion clinic of Henry Morgentaler. The loss of merchandise, combined with a slow insurance settlement and delays in reopening put significant strain on the bookstore's finances. A Fire Sale, where the bookstore sold off merchandise damaged in the fire to supporters of its cause, provided enough capital for the bookstore to re-open at a new location, 73 Harbord St. An employee of the store at the time of its firebombing, Janine Fuller, later moved to Vancouver, where she became manager of Little Sister's Book and Art Emporium and attained prominence as one of Canada's most influential anti-censorship activists in the store's ongoing battles against Canada Customs. The store later suffered more moderate damage in a second firebombing attack on Morgentaler's clinic in May 1992.

By 1993, stiff competition from larger chain bookstores saw the Toronto's Women's bookstore showing a loss. Similar situations faced many other independent bookstores around the same time. The bookstore reorganised its operations, expanding their inventory of books on anti-racism, feminist theory, disability and health. The bookstore also engaged in increased community outreach, with more book readings and launches, as well as hosting book clubs. Combined with a Jobs Ontario Community Action Grant, the store turned around its operations and stopped losing money. The store also increased its emphasis on books aimed at visible minority women, with separate sections titled "African-Canadian," "Caribbean," "South Asian" "First Nations," "Latina," and "Arab."

Although the bookstore had long served as a source of course books for University of Toronto classes requiring special or hard to find texts, its market was substantially strengthened during the 2000 worker's strike at the University of Toronto bookstore, when many professors withdrew their required textbooks from the university's bookstore as a show of solidarity with the strikers, preferring to have them retailed through the Toronto Women's Bookstore. At the conclusion of the strike, many of those professors did not resume offering their course texts at the university's bookstore.

The rise in sale of eBooks, online book retailers, and the Great Recession led to the closure of the bookstore on 30 November 2012.

== Operations ==
Located near the University of Toronto, the bookstore stocked the texts used in many anthropology, sociology and women's history courses offered at the university. The reliable business of students in these courses amounted to roughly two thirds of the bookstore's total sales.

In addition to book sales, the store hosted book clubs, book launches and author signings. It also ran courses on a variety of subjects of interest to women, including knitting, writing, and explorations of bisexuality.

== Recognition ==
The Toronto Women's Bookstore was voted "Best Bookstore in Toronto" by Now Magazine in 2005.

== See also ==
- Feminism in Canada
