= Bebout =

Bebout is a surname. Notable people with the surname include:

- Eli Bebout (born 1946), American politician
- Nick Bebout (born 1951), American football player
- Rick Bébout (né Bebout, 1950–2009), Canadian journalist and activist
