= Ann Bishop =

Ann Bishop may refer to:

- Ann Bishop (biologist) (1899–1990), protozoologist from Cambridge University and member of the Royal Society
- Ann Bishop (journalist) (1931–1997), US broadcast journalist
- Anne Bishop, American fantasy writer
- Anne Bishop (activist) (born 1950), Canadian activist and social justice advocate

== See also ==
- Anna Bishop (1810–1884), English operatic soprano
- Anne Bishop (born 1955), American fantasy writer
- Anne Bishop (activist) (born 1950), Canadian adult education writer and social activist
