= Perceptions (magazine) =

LGBT news magazine

- Categories: GLBTQ, News, Health, Opinion
- Founded: 1983
- First issue: March–April 1983
- Final issue: 2013
- Country: Canada
- Based in: Saskatoon, Saskatchewan
- Language: English

Perceptions was an LGBT news magazine which began publication in 1983 in Saskatoon, Saskatchewan, Canada.

== History and profile ==
The periodical, founded in 1983 by Gens Hellquist, was the longest-running GLBTQ publication in Canada. The magazine was first published in March 1983 as a bimonthly publication. It provided broad geographical news coverage, but with emphasis on the three Canadian prairie provinces (Saskatchewan, Alberta, and Manitoba). Issues also often carried opinion pieces, book and music reviews, articles on local GLBTQ history, and analytical pieces. Health issues in the GLBTQ community were an ongoing concern of the publishers. A directory of GLBTQ prairie organizations was printed in each issue. Later the frequency of the magazine switched to eight times a year.

A detailed index, covering the period 1983 through 2004, is available electronically and in print. The electronic index is freely available to all for searching through the University of Saskatchewan Library's Saskatchewan Resources for Sexual and Gender Diversity website.

Copies of the magazine are held in a number of Canadian libraries, in full or partial runs. See, for example, the holdings of Library and Archives Canada, University of Saskatchewan Library (Saskatoon), University of Toronto's Thomas Fisher Library, and the Canadian Lesbian and Gay Archives (now renamed ArQuives) (Toronto).

A collection of articles from the periodical has been published under the title: Gay on the Canadian Prairie: Twenty Years of Perceptions, 1983-2002. This collection is available in a limited number of Canadian academic libraries, and also in electronic (PDF) format in the Library and Archives Canada catalogue and at the Internet Archive.

Perceptions folded in 2013 when its founder Gens Hellquist died.
