= The ArQuives =

Canadian organization that preserves historical LGBT materials

Coordinates: 43°40′05″N 79°23′20.3″W

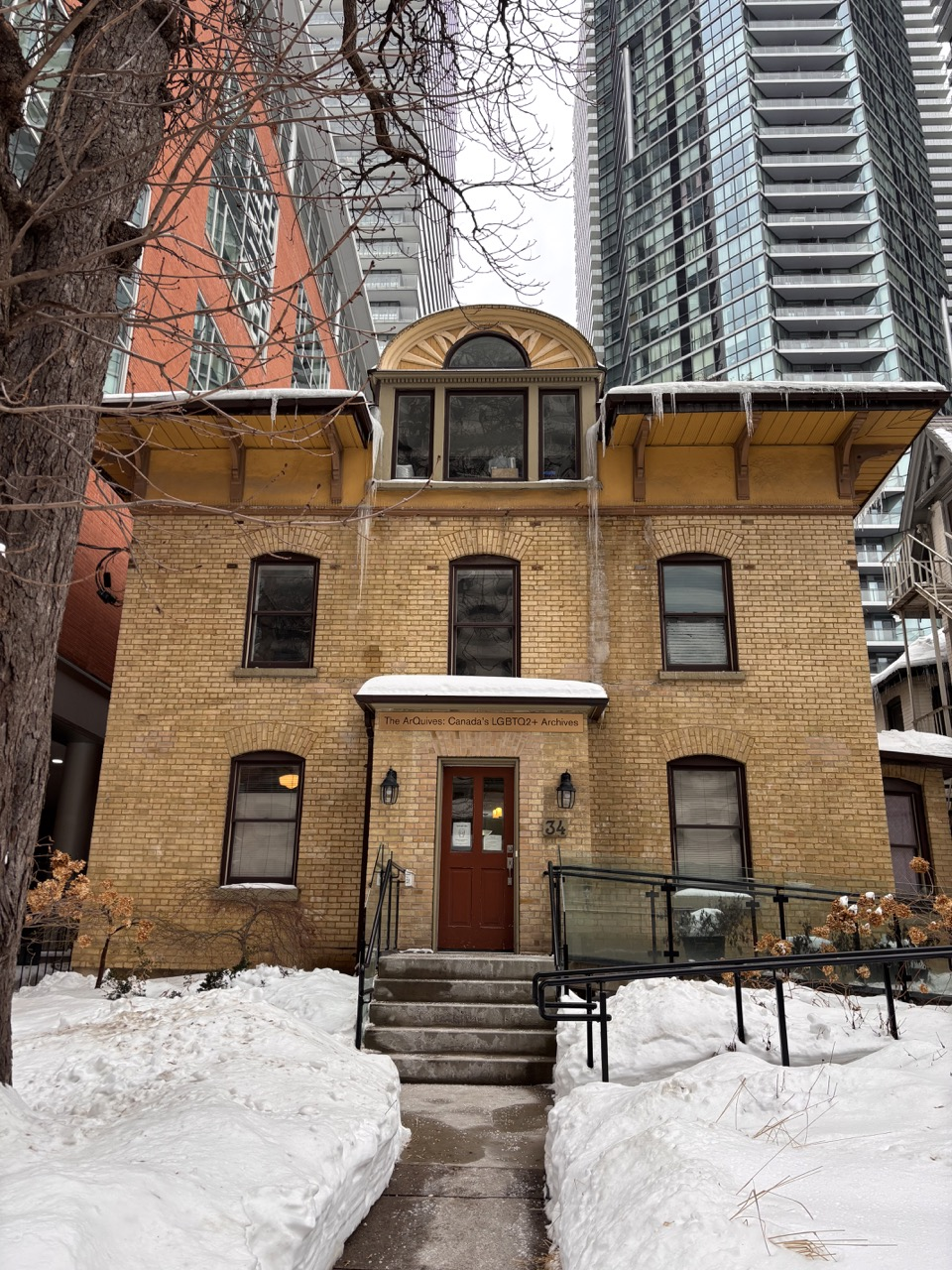
- Exterior view of the ArQuives
- Formation: 1973
- Type: Archive organization based in Toronto, Ontario, Canada
- Legal status: active
- Headquarters: Toronto, Ontario, Canada
- Region served: Canada
- Official language: English; French
- Staff: 3
- Volunteers: 150
- Website: arquives.ca

The ArQuives: Canada's LGBTQ2+ Archives, formerly known as the Canadian Lesbian and Gay Archives, is a Canadian non-profit organization, founded in 1973 as the Canadian Gay Liberation Movement Archives. The ArQuives acquires, preserves, and provides public access to material and information by and about lesbian, gay, bisexual, transgender, queer, and two-spirit communities primarily in Canada.

== History ==
The ArQuives was established in 1973 by The Body Politic's editorial collective (also known as the Pink Triangle Press). Established as the Canadian Gay Liberation Movement Archives, the organization changed its name to the Canadian Gay Archives in 1975. The Canadian Gay Archives incorporated in 1980 and received charitable status in 1981. The CGA formed a Board of Directors in 1992; and adopted the name Canadian Lesbian and Gay Archives in 1993.

Beginning as a one-cupboard reference collection co-housed with Pink Triangle Press, the ArQuives relocated to an independent location on Temperance Street in downtown Toronto in 1992.

In November 2005, the ArQuives moved to a temporary location at 65 Wellesley Street in the city's Church and Wellesley gay village, launched a fundraising campaign, and began the search for a permanent home in the same area. The historic Jared Sessions house was built in 1860 and was located at 34 Isabella Street. The building was sold to the ArQuives for $1 by the Children's Aid Society of Toronto (CAS) after CAS began construction on a newer, larger building next door. The sale of the Jared Sessions house was facilitated by Toronto City Councillor Kyle Rae. After major renovations to the building, The ArQuives re-opened in September 2009. In December 2016, the Archives received a $50,000 grant from Toronto City Council to improve the building's accessibility for people with disabilities.

Today the ArQuives has a reading room and rare book library, vertical file room, offices, AV room, and gallery space for exhibitions. Additional holdings remain at 65 Wellesley and in deep storage.

At its AGM in May 2018, after a year-long consultation process, the organization changed its name to the ArQuives: Canada's LGBTQ2+ Archives.

== Collections ==
The ArQuives was established in order to "preserve, organize, and give public access to information and materials in any medium, by and about LGBTQ2+ people, primarily produced in or concerning Canada". The ArQuives' collections are not limited to traditional printed material, but instead contain many diverse collections.

=== Artifacts ===
In addition to traditional printed material (over 3000 books, diaries, booklets, leaflets, programmes, zines, press clippings, etc.), the ArQuives collects artifacts that would normally be considered museum objects to capture specific moments in the history of the lesbian and gay community. Such artifacts include:

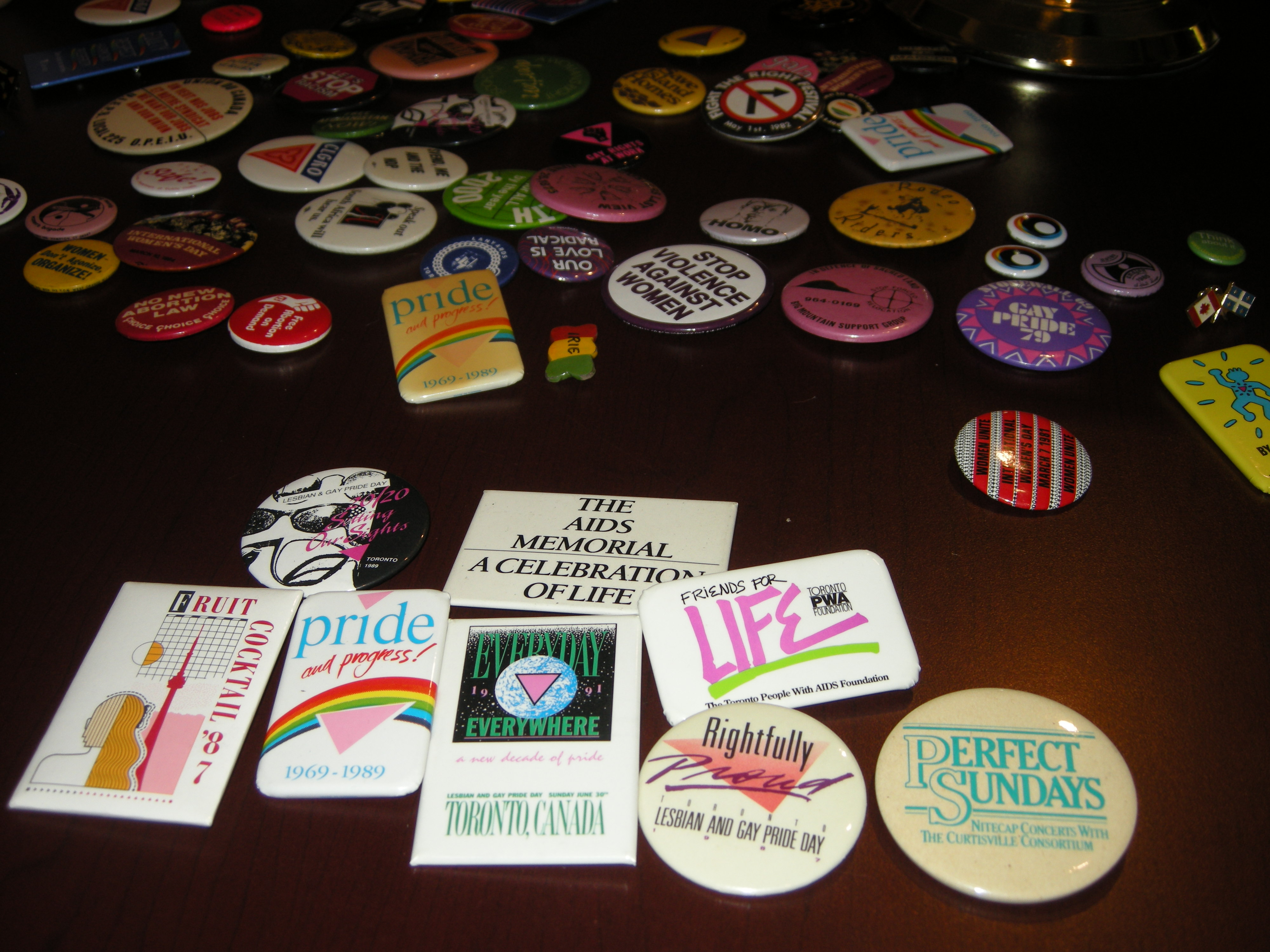
Sample of buttons from the ArQuives' collection

- Banners and flags
- Buttons and pins
- Leather items
- Matchbooks and matchboxes
- T-shirts
- Trophies
- Uniforms

=== Artwork ===
The ArQuives has acquired over 500 original works of art from within the LGBT community. These are primarily paper or canvas works, and the emphasis is historical. Examples include:

- Costumes, drawings and photographs by Ronald McRae
- Paintings by JAC, the artist collective of John Grube, Alex Liros and Clarence Barnes
- Works exhibited by Gallery Without Walls
- Submissions for Toronto's AIDS Memorial

=== Audio recordings ===
Containing more than 2000 hours of sound on tapes and over 1300 discs, the ArQuives houses LPs, gramophone records, cassettes, and CDs. Much of this material is vocal or instrumental recordings of lesbian and gay performers, but there is also a significant library of taped interviews and radio programs. The ArQuives also has over 150 oral histories in its collections, including the Foolscap Gay Oral History Project (over 125 interviews with gay men, conducted in the 1980s, about gay life in Toronto before Stonewall); the Lesbians Making History project (approximately eight interviews with lesbians, conducted in the 1980s, about lesbian life in Toronto in the decades before 1985); and the Trans Health Care Activism in Ontario oral history project (eight interviews about activism from the late 1990s through 2008).

=== Moving images ===
The collection's moving images collection includes more than 2200 items, in 8 mm film and 16 mm film, Betamax, VHS, and DVD formats. While there are feature films, documentaries, and erotica housed in the Archives, there are also videos shot at lesbian and gay community events. Because of its extensive video and film collection, the Archives are often used to provide source material for Canadian film projects, such as Forbidden Love.

=== National Portrait Collection ===
Established in 1998, the National Portrait Collection honours individuals who have contributed to the growth and development of the LGBT community in Canada. Currently, the collection holds 75 portraits in various mediums, including photography, watercolour, and oil.

As of 2016, people depicted in the portrait collection include Elmer Bagares, Chris Bearchell, Rick Bébout, Anne Bishop, Persimmon Blackbridge, Nicole Brossard, Alec Butler, Bernard Courte, Harold Desmarais, C.M. Donald, Michelle Douglas, John Duggan, Sara Ellen Dunlop, Jim Egan, Gloria Eshkibok, Lynne Fernie, John Fisher, Janine Fuller, Richard Fung, Sky Gilbert, Amy Gottlieb, John Greyson, Brent Hawkes, Gens Hellquist, Tomson Highway, Charlie Hill, George Hislop, Richard Hudler, David Kelley, El-Farouk Khaki, Robert Laliberté, k.d. lang, Denis Leblanc, John Alan Lee, Bev Lepischak, Alan Li, Michael Lynch, Ann-Marie MacDonald, Jovette Marchessault, Tim McCaskell, Mary Meigs, Billy Merasty, Robin Metcalfe, Peter Millard, Bonte Minnema, Jearld Moldenhauer, Shani Mootoo, Alex Munter, Pat Murphy, Glen Murray, Nancy Nicol, Richard North, Keith Norton, Carmen Paquette, Carole Pope, Ken Popert, Kyle Rae, Rupert Raj, David Rayside, Neil Richards, Marie Robertson, Svend Robinson, Gerry Rogers, Mirha-Soleil Ross, Jane Rule, Craig Russell, Kyle Scanlon, Shyam Selvadurai, Makeda Silvera, Mary-Woo Sims, Tim Stevenson, Douglas Stewart, Barbara Thornborrow, Shelley Tremain, Susan Ursel, Chris Vogel, Delwin Vriend, Tom Warner, Douglas Wilson, and Eve Zaremba.

=== Periodicals ===
The ArQuives contains the largest collection of LGBT periodicals at an independent archives in the world, with over 9500 individual titles. The ArQuives also houses a general collection of periodicals not specifically produced for the LGBT community, but concerning feminism, the arts, and alternative culture that include LGBT issues and an indication of changing attitudes in mainstream media.

=== Personal and organizational records ===
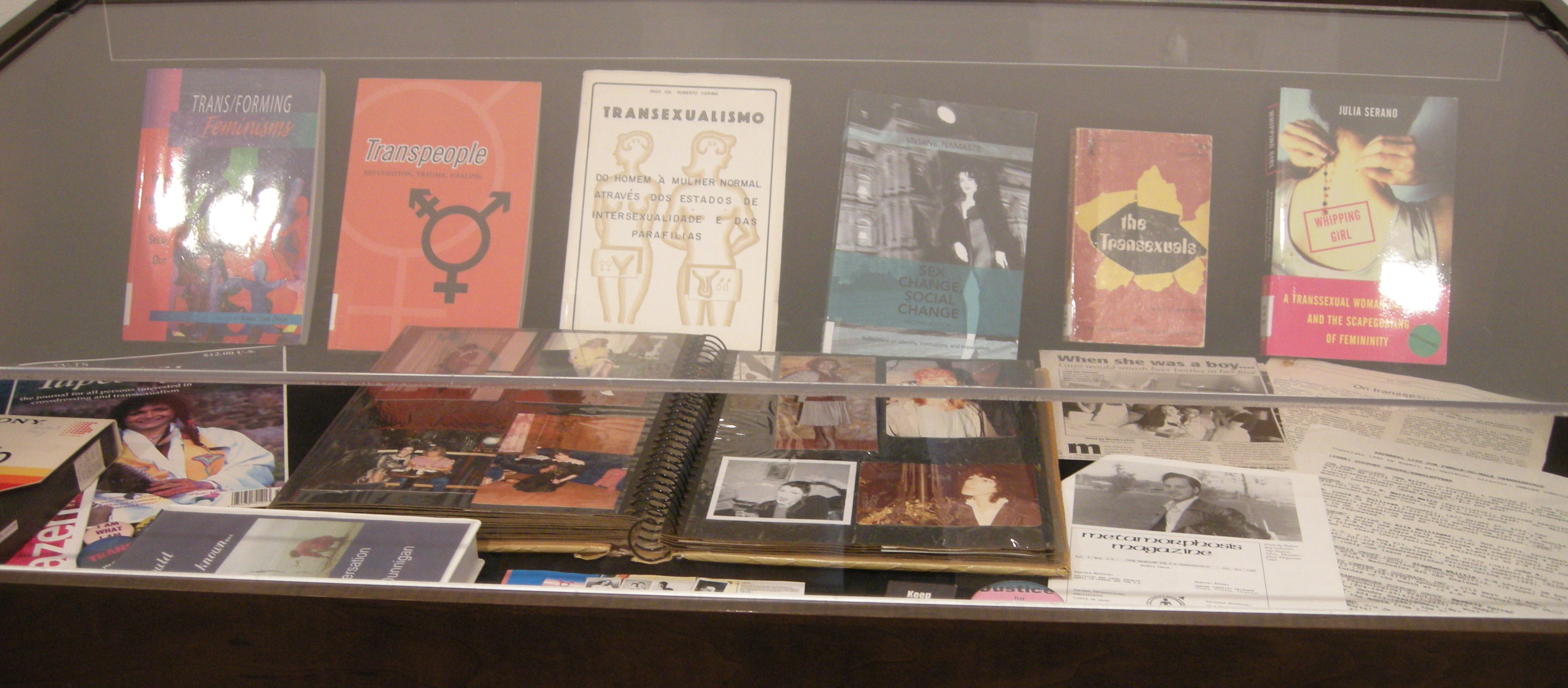
Trans material display

The Archives holds records of Canadian LGBTQ2+ organizations, as well as the personal records of prominent Canadians active in, or significant to, the lesbian, gay, bisexual, trans, queer, and two-spirit communities. This includes the following fonds:

- AIDS Action Now!
- AIDS Committee of Ottawa
- AIDS Committee of Toronto
- AIDS Vancouver
- Alliance for South Asian AIDS Prevention
- Anthony Mohamed
- Bernard Courte
- Billeh Nickerson
- Cabbagetown Group Softball League
- Campaign for Equal Families
- Canadian AIDS Society
- Carroll Holland
- Community One Foundation (Previously "Lesbian & Gay Community Appeal" or "The Appeal")
- Charlie David
- Community Homophile Association of Toronto
- Danny Cockerline
- David Pepper
- Duane "Andy" Anderson
- Egale Canada
- Gay and Lesbian Alliance at Stanford
- Gay and Lesbian Organization of Bell Employees (GLOBE)
- Gregory Pavelich
- Harold Desmarais
- Helen Lenskyj
- John Alan Lee
- Khush: South Asian Lesbian and Gay Association
- Kyle Rae
- Lesbian Outdoor Group
- Mary Woo Sims
- Mirha-Soleil Ross
- Nancy Nicol
- R. Douglas Elliott
- Ron Rosenes
- Rupert Raj
- Shirley Shea
- Supporting Our Youth
- Tim McCaskell
- Tony Farebrother
- University of Toronto Homophile Association
- Valerie Dugale
- William Atkinson

=== Photographs ===
Beginning as the photo files for The Body Politic, the Archives grew around the photograph collection, and while many of the items are not yet cataloged due to the high number of entries, the Archives houses over 7000 individual items in various mediums, including prints, negatives, and halftone reproductions.

In terms of scope, the photographs depict the LGBT community in a broad sense: photographs of demonstrations, conferences, social events, performances, and police harassment, as well the LGBT community's personal, domestic, and social lives.

=== Posters ===
Posters in the ArQuives are predominantly Canadian, with some international, representing film, theatre, concerts, parties, bars, and avant-garde art, within the LGBT community.

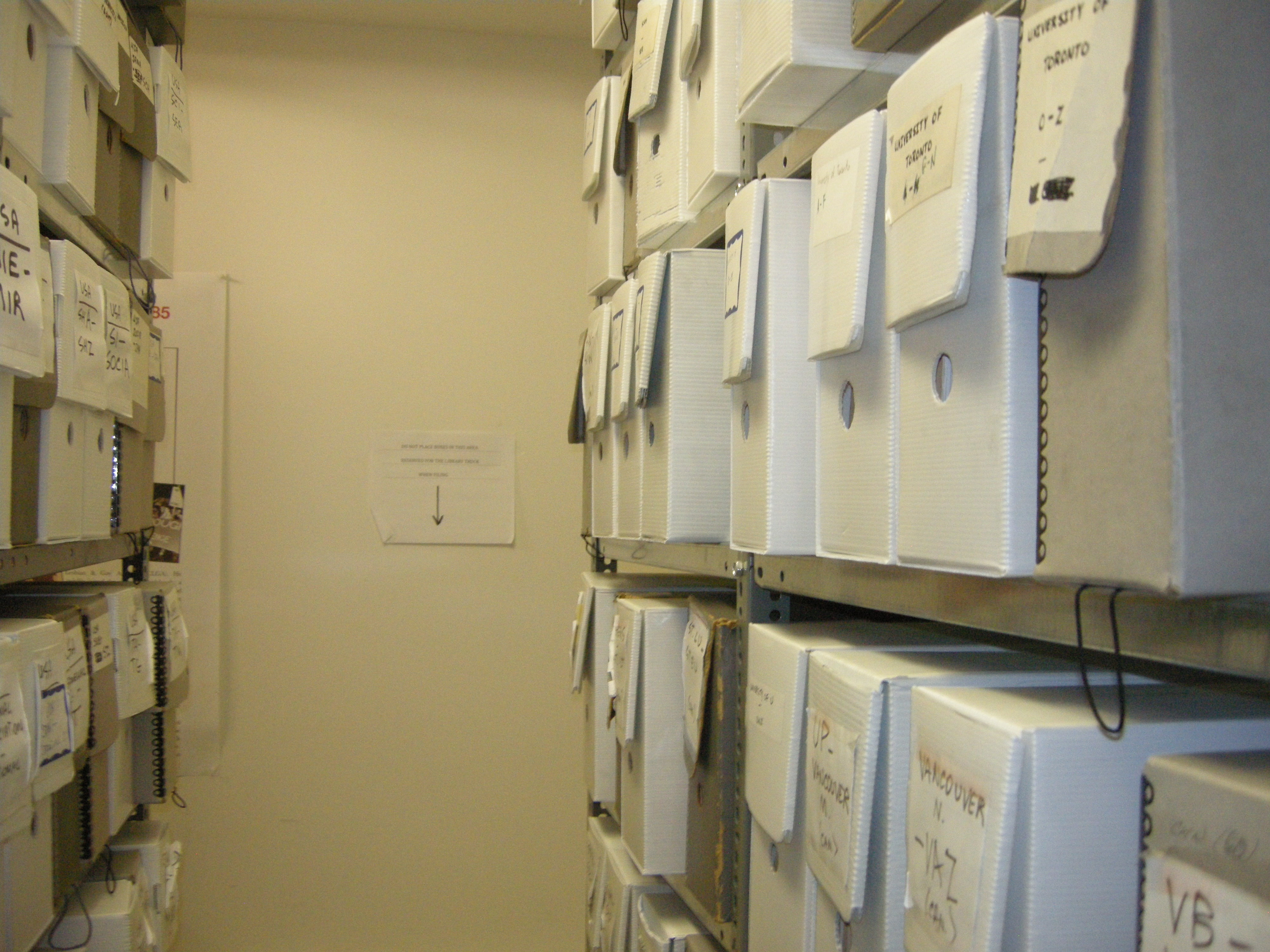
Vertical files at the CLGA

=== Vertical files ===
The ArQuives currently holds over 30,000 vertical files on people, groups, and events affecting the LGBT community. Unlike most of the Archives, the vertical files provide information about an individual or organization, rather than information produced by the individual or organization. The vertical files contain approximately fifty percent Canadian content and fifty percent international content.

== Exhibitions ==
To exhibit work that honours LGBT community and encourages dialogue, the Archives has an exhibition programme. A sample of past exhibitions includes:

- We Could Be Heroes (Just For One Day) – March to May 2016
- Queering Space – June to September 2015
- Marked: Tattoos & Queer Identity – April to May 2015
- Code, Read: Hollywood's Hays Code and the Queer Stereotypes of the Silver Screen – February to March 2015
- Butch: Not Like the Other Girls – November 2014 to January 2015
- Rocking the Boat: Celebrating Queer Content in Canadian Concert Dance – November 2013 to April 2014
- Colour Coded: queer abstraction meets fruity frosting – September to November 2013
- Gay Premises: Radical Voices in the Archives, 1973–1983 and TAG TEAM: Gay Premises – June to September 2013
- Public Sins / Private Desires: Tracing Lesbian Lives in the Archives, 1950–1980 – June to August 2012
- CENSORED LIVES: Suppression, resistance and free speech – June to September 2010
- National Portrait Collection – September 2009 to November 2010

== Outreach ==
The ArQuives' outreach initiatives include tours and study opportunities for undergraduates.

== See also ==
- LGBT rights in Canada
- Timeline of LGBT history in Canada
