= Pride Toronto =

Annual LGBTQ event in Toronto, Ontario

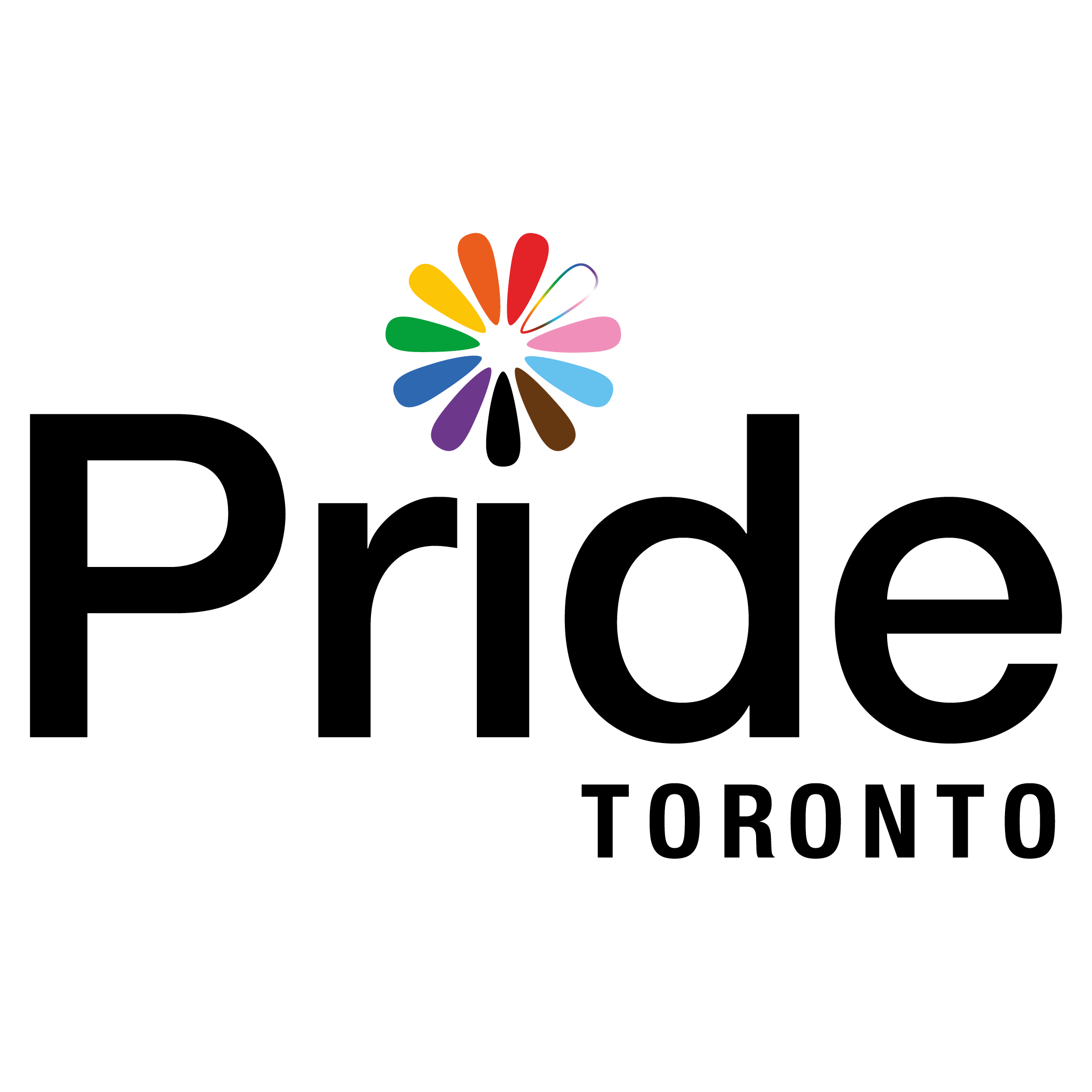
- Formation: 1981; 45 years ago
- Type: Festival organization based in Toronto, Ontario
- Legal status: active
- Purpose: advocate and public voice, educator and network
- Headquarters: Toronto
- Region served: Toronto
- Executive director: Sherwin Modeste
- Website: Pride Toronto

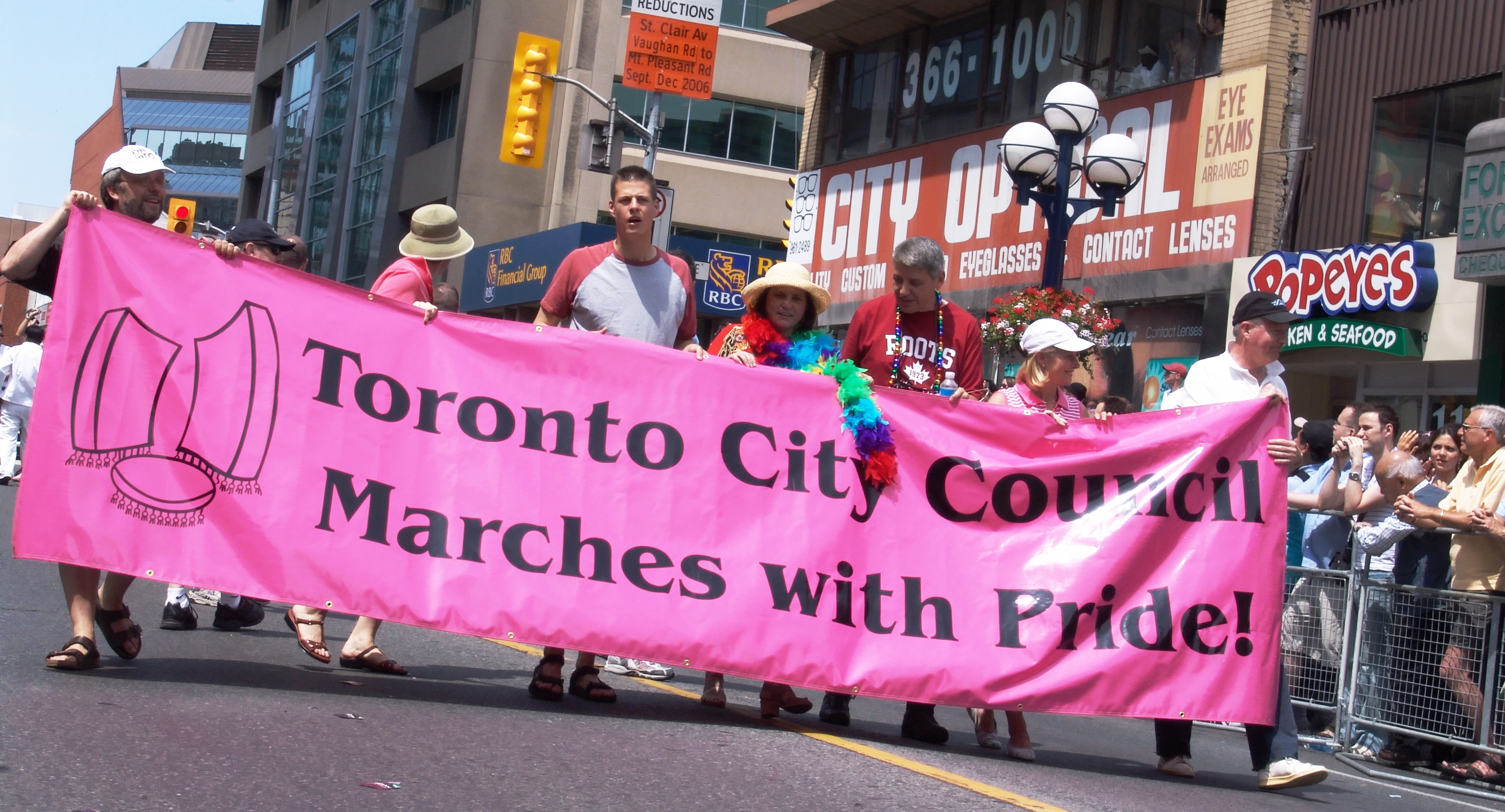
Several Toronto City Councillors taking part in the 2006 Pride Parade

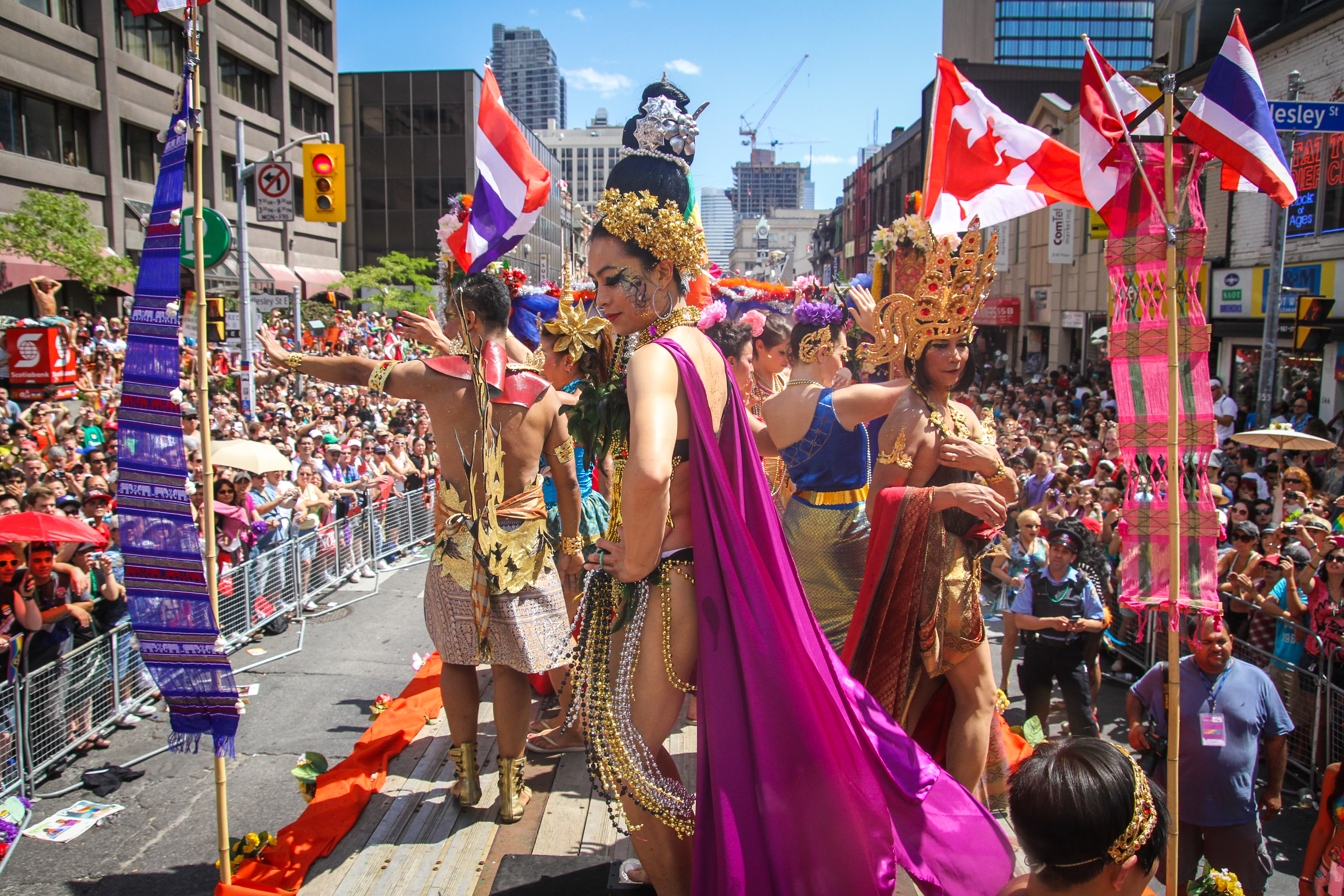
2012 Thai-Canadian float at Pride Parade

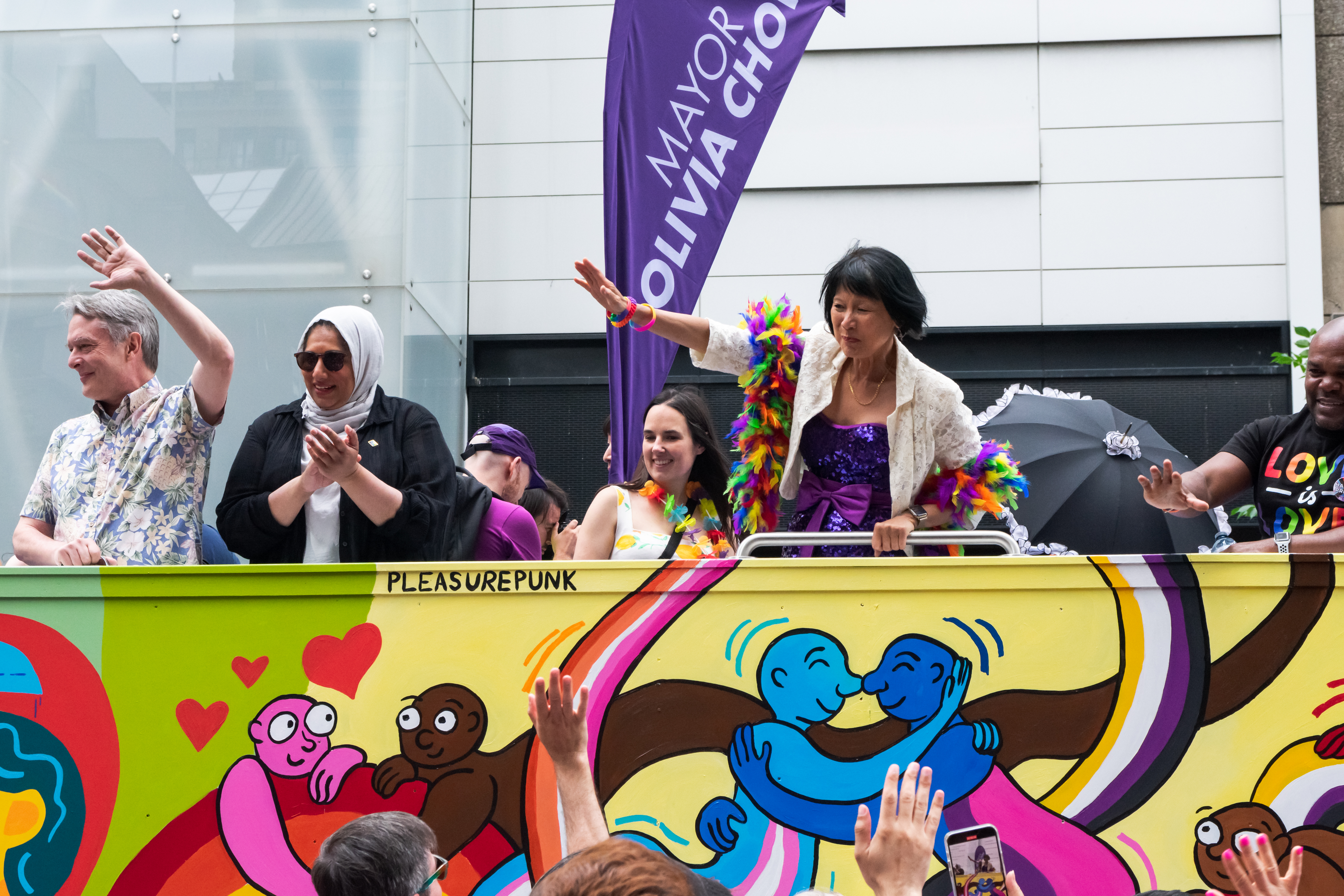
Toronto Mayor Olivia Chow at the 2024 Pride Parade

Pride Toronto is an annual event held in Toronto, Ontario, Canada, in June each year to celebrate the LGBTQ community in the Greater Toronto Area. The centre of the festival is the city's Church and Wellesley village, while the parade and marches are primarily routed along the nearby Yonge Street, Gerrard Street and Bloor Street. In 2014, the event served as the fourth international WorldPride.

The first parade occurred in June 1981. For most of its history, Pride was a seven-to-ten day festival centred on the final week in June, with the parade falling on either the last weekend in June or the first weekend in July depending on the year's circumstances. Since 2016, the entire month of June has been declared Pride month, with a program of events throughout the month leading up to the parade.

The event is the second largest Pride in the world with almost 3 million attendees every year.

== History ==
Toronto's Pride Week evolved out of the mass protests that followed the 1981 Toronto bathhouse raids, and celebrated its 25th anniversary in 2005. In the 2005 parade, newly appointed Toronto police chief Bill Blair became the first chief of police in the city's history to personally take part in the parade. He marched alongside politicians of all parties, including several federal and provincial cabinet ministers and Mayor David Miller.

Pride Toronto officials said that Pride Week 2009 drew an estimated one million people to Toronto and contributed CA$136 million to the city's economy, and state that they expect WorldPride to be significantly bigger. The actual numbers turned out to be closer to 2 million visitors. Economic impact was first reported at $286 million in 2014 and later updated to $719 million.

== Controversies ==
=== Commercialization and marginalization ===
Toronto Pride Week has not been without controversy, as the growth of the event in recent years has led to allegations that it has become an overly commercial enterprise dependent on corporate sponsors and business interests, to the detriment of local community groups and political activism. Although Pride officially defines itself as inclusive of all races, communities and gender identifications, many such groups within the LGBTQ community have alleged that their events and communities and issues are increasingly marginalized in favour of a commercialized agenda. For example, many smaller community groups have indicated that they can no longer afford the increased fees required to place a marching contingent in the parade, which is increasingly dominated by corporate-sponsored advertising floats; and many LGBTQ-owned small businesses which historically depended on vendor booths at Pride Toronto for publicity have indicated that they can no longer afford the increased fees for inclusion in the vendor area.

As early as 2010 the Blackness Yes! committee, which organizes an annual dance party called Blockorama for LGBTQ people of colour, was raising the alarm that their program was being involuntarily forced to move from its traditional space, the Wellesley Stage across from Wellesley subway station, to unsuitable spaces such as the smaller parking lot in front of the Church Street Beer Store, the unpaved and unsuitable-for-dancing George Hislop Park, or the far too small Alexander Street Parkette.

In 2015, Pride Toronto was forced to withdraw applications to trademark the phrases "Dyke March" and "Trans Pride", both referring to events which are organized by outside groups on Pride weekend as a reaction to lesbian and transgender people's concerns that their issues and needs are not adequately addressed by Pride.

=== Queers Against Israeli Apartheid ===
In 2010 there was a controversy over Pride Toronto's decisions regarding the participation of the group, Queers Against Israeli Apartheid (QuAIA). Initially, Pride Toronto agreed not to allow the phrase "Israeli Apartheid" as part of a deal with the City of Toronto (which had suggested that funding would be reviewed if the group was included). However, Pride Toronto subsequently reversed that decision June 23 (after it had received the funds from the city), allowing the group to participate. Several Pro-Israel groups also attended the event.

Pride Week's decision to reverse the ban on QuAIA after it had received funding from the city (which was done on the condition that QuAIA not be allowed to participate) drew sharp criticism from several sources. Rob Ford, who was then a mayoral candidate (he was subsequently elected several months later), stated that: "I want to express my disappointment and disgust with Pride Toronto's decision to allow this hateful group to march." Giorgio Mammoliti, who was also running for mayor, announced that he would introduce a motion at the city council demanding that Pride return the $250,000 it had received from the city to reject all of Pride's future funding requests. In an editorial, the National Post called for both the City of Toronto and corporate sponsors to halt all funding to Pride Week, arguing that: "Anti-Israel bigots are free to have their own parade – but not on the public dime. The City of Toronto, whose councilors already have explicitly denounced QuAIA's "apartheid" propaganda, should prepare to cut funding. Corporate sponsors should do likewise."

In March 2011, Toronto mayor Rob Ford said that he would not allow city funding for the 2011 Toronto Pride Parade if organizers allowed QuAIA to march again this year. "Taxpayers dollars should not go toward funding hate speech", Ford said. However, on April 13, 2011, the non-partisan Toronto city manager released a report for the city council's executive committee concluding that "the participation of QUAIA in the Pride Parade based solely on the phrase 'Israeli Apartheid' does not violate the City's Anti-Discrimination Policy. The City also cannot therefore conclude that the use of term on signs or banners to identify QuAIA constitutes the promotion of hatred or seeks to incite discrimination contrary to the Code." Ford indicated that he planned to defund the parade regardless of the city manager's report. On April 15, 2011, QuAIA announced that it would withdraw from the 2011 Pride parade; however, councillor Giorgio Mammoliti responded that he would still introduce a motion to withdraw city funding from Pride Toronto if the committee did not explicitly ban the group from participating.

In June 2012, the Toronto city council voted to condemn the phrase "Israeli apartheid" as part of a resolution recognizing the Pride parade as a "significant cultural event that strongly promotes the ideals of tolerance and diversity". The resolution condemned the term "Israeli apartheid" for undermining the values of Pride and diminishing "the suffering experienced by individuals during the apartheid regime in South Africa".

=== Black Lives Matter ===
At the 2016 parade, the Toronto chapter of Black Lives Matter, who had been selected by Pride as the honoured group, interrupted the parade for approximately half an hour to call attention to a number of demands addressing racism in the LGBTQ community. The demands included Pride providing stable funding and space to events for LGBTQ people of colour such as Blockorama, Black Queer Youth and the South Asian stage, which had seen funding cuts and repeated relocation to less convenient or suitable venues in recent years, as well as increasing diversity in the hiring of the organization's staff and board — however, media coverage focused primarily on one explosive demand: that Toronto Police officers be barred from participating in Pride while in uniform, in response to ongoing police harassment of people of colour and transgender people.

Executive director Mathieu Chantelois signed BLM's statement of demand, but later asserted that he had signed it only to end the sit-in and get the parade moving, and had not agreed to honour the demands. Following criticism of his handling of the incident, he resigned as executive director of Pride approximately six weeks later on August 11.

Debate over the action focused primarily on the question of whether banning uniformed police from the parade represented an abdication of the organization's stated values of diversity and inclusivity, largely without regard to the matter of whether not honouring the demand, thereby alienating racialized and transgender members of the community, would also be an abdication of those same values. Some media analysts claimed that BLM was an outside group with no connection to LGBTQ issues at all, and thus should not have been invited to participate in the first place, even though all of the demands related directly to Pride's handling of transgender and racial issues, and BLM leaders Janaya Khan and Syrus Marcus Ware are both queer-identified. Pride staff have reaffirmed on more than one occasion that police were not barred from participating in the parade at all, but were simply being directed not to march in uniform.

At Pride's general meeting in January 2017, the organization's members voted to affirm the motion that police not be permitted to march in uniform. Some opponents of the motion have falsely claimed that the meeting, and the resulting discussion about the police motion, were conducted in secret even though the meeting was scheduled and advertised normally and widely publicized by the media.

Following the meeting, Toronto Police chief Mark Saunders announced that the organization would voluntarily withdraw from any attempt to challenge the Pride membership's vote or participate in the parade. He affirmed, however, that the police service would continue to hold its established annual Pride reception, and would raise the rainbow flag at Toronto Police Headquarters.

The decision led Toronto City Council to debate withdrawing its Pride funding for 2017. The motion to withdraw funding, put forward by councillor John Campbell, failed on a vote of 27-17. A small group of Toronto residents organized a competing event with the theme of "first responder unity", which was scheduled for the same time as the main Pride parade but was located in another part of downtown Toronto. The First Responder Unity event made unauthorized use of Pride's logo on its website, as well as making deceptive marketing claims in an apparent attempt to portray itself as the "real" Pride event, calling itself one of the world's largest LGBTQ events and claiming a million attendees — Pride's usual attendance figures — months before the Unity event's actual attendance figures could possibly even be predicted. On June 19, however, Saunders publicly indicated that Toronto Police officers who wished to attend that event were also not permitted to do so in uniform.

In October 2018, Pride Toronto made the announcement that Toronto Police have been granted permission to march in the 2019 Pride parade. However, three months later Pride Toronto members reversed that position when they voted 163-161 to not allow uniformed officers in the 2019 parade.

=== Departure of Olivia Nuamah ===
In January 2020, Pride Toronto announced that Olivia Nuamah was no longer its executive director, as of January 15. Despite concerns from the organization's membership about the timing of her departure just months before the 2020 event, the board declined to clarify the reasons for her departure or even whether she had resigned or had been fired.

=== Federal grant repayment ===
In 2024, it was reported that Pride Toronto would be repaying just over $505,000 in federal grant funding after the accounting firm KPMG found that the organization could not prove that it completed several projects despite receiving $1.85 million from the federal government.

== COVID-19 pandemic ==
It was announced on March 31, 2020, that Toronto's in-person Pride parade and festivities, originally scheduled for June 26 to 28, 2020, had been cancelled, as mandated by the City of Toronto's prohibition on city-led mass events, parades and festivities until at least June 30, 2020, owing to the impact of the COVID-19 pandemic in Canada, although virtual Pride Month festivities and an online "parade" hosted by comedian Brandon Ash-Mohammed took place in June on the Pride Toronto website.

It was announced on February 24, 2021, that given the ban on city-led and permitted events had been extended through to June 30, 2021, the in-person Pride parade and other Pride-related festivities originally scheduled for June 25 to 27, 2021, would be cancelled. The event was again staged virtually and was hosted by Canada's Drag Race season 1 winner Priyanka, with performers including Allie X, iskwē and Gary Beals. Despite the lack of an official Pride celebration, some small-scale Pride events did take place, including a Dyke March and a No Pride in Policing rally.

== Financial difficulties ==
=== 2009 ===
On June 15, 2009, before the 2009 Pride Week festival, it was announced through the office of then Minister of State Diane Ablonczy that Pride Toronto would receive a $400,000 federal grant under the Marquee Tourism program. Shortly after this announcement, Charles McVety's Institute for Canadian Values issued a public statement titled "Conservatives Announce New Program to Fund Sex Parades," which condemned Stephen Harper's Conservative government for granting Pride Toronto the award and conflated the festival with sex abuse against children. It was later revealed that the Conservative government stripped Ablonczy of responsibility for the Marquee Tourism program within days of the announced funding for Pride Week, with the Institute for Canadian Values statement and the ensuing uproar reportedly playing a role. Conservative MP Brad Trost was quoted as saying, "The pro-life and pro-family community should know and understand that the tourism funding money that went to the gay pride parade in Toronto was not government policy."

=== May 2010 ===
In May 2010 it was revealed that Pride Toronto would not receive further federal funding under the Marquee Tourism program, despite having received a favorable review for its grant application. Toronto City Councilor Kyle Rae commented on the announcement, saying "Reading the political tea leaves from last year, and Diane Ablonczy being shoved aside, I think all of us saw that this was going to happen."

=== July 2010 ===
In the late summer of 2010 it was reported that Pride Toronto was facing severe financial difficulties because of the withdrawal of future funding from corporations and the City of Toronto due to the decision to allow QuAIA(Queers Against Israel Apartheid) to participate in the parade. Pride Toronto executive director Tracey Sandilands stated in an interview that "the fact that we might not be able to count on city funding next year, and existing sponsors who have given us notice in writing to say that unless we resolve the issues to their satisfaction, they will no longer be sponsoring us next year. So next year looks very bleak at this point."

Audited financial statements released on January 25, 2011, indicated that Pride week had a $431,808 operating deficit for 2009/2010 (ending July 31, 2010), up from $138,605 in 2008/2009. Pride Week's bank indebtedness had increased significantly, from a surplus of $219,296 in 2009 to a deficit of $155,232 in 2010. In the 2009/2010 financial year, sponsorships, which were identified as the primary source of financial difficulties, increased by 17% over 2009 (from $1,225,044 to $1,469,027). However, the total value of the grants Pride Week received declined from $971,800 in 2009 to $709,025 in 2010.

== Awards ==
The Pride Week event received the Top Choice Award for Top Event of the year 2007/2008.

== Honoured groups ==
Each year, Pride Toronto identifies an honoured group or charity of choice that are highlighted for their contributions to LGBTQ communities. These have included:

- 2016: Black Lives Matter – Toronto
- 2017: Rainbow Railroad
- 2018: Native Women's Resource Centre
- 2019: Women's College Hospital
- 2020: The 519 and Maggie's Toronto Sex Workers Action Project
- 2021: The ArQuives and Breakaway Community Services
- 2022: Black Coalition for AIDS Prevention (BLACKCAP)
- 2023: Friends of Ruby and The Stephen Lewis Foundation
- 2024: African Centre For Refugees and LetsStopAIDS
- 2025: Canvas Programs

== Programs and stages ==
Pride Toronto hosts multiple programs and stages, including several which occur every year. These include:

- Drag Ball
- Blockorama
- CATALYST
- Pride Live
- New Ho Queen
- Dirty Disco
- Kiss My Lips
- Alternaqueer
- brOWN//out
- Yalla Barra
- BQC
- Pride Kiki Ball
- Youth Pride
- Family Pride
- Trans Pride
- Dyke Pride
- Francophone Pride
- Burlesque
- Two Spirit and Indigenous Pride

== Headliners ==
Each year Pride Toronto produces over 200 hours of free stage programming across 10-12 stages, featuring over 600 musical and drag acts.

Year	Headliners
2018	Brandy; Kehlani; BbyMutha; BenDeLaCreme; SWV
2019	Pabllo Vittar; Tweet; Mýa; Big Freedia; TR/ST; Monét X Change; John Jellybean Benitez; Brooke Lynn Hytes; Bambii; Nakhane; Venus X; Angelé Anang; Kandy Zyanide; Kanna Warrior
2020	No headliners due to COVID-19
2021	Allie X; iskwe
2022	Spice; Symone; Patrice Roberts; Priyanka; D.W Waterson; The House of Miyake Mugler; Mike Q; Bambii
2023	Lights; Saucy Santana; cupcakKe; Pamputtae; Nadia Batson; Rêve; Sasha Colby; Jimbo; Landon Cider; Plastique Tiara; Sugar & Spice; Devon Cole; Trinity K. Bonet; Essel; Gisèle Lullaby; Icesis Couture; Witch Prophet
2024	Tokischa; Flo; Thelma Houston; CeCe Peniston; Ultra Naté; Tommy Genesis; Dragonette; Lu Kala; Debby Friday; Carole Pope (of Rough Trade); Simone Denny (of Love Inc.); Begonia; Sapphira Cristál; Plane Jane; Pangina Heals; Nicky Doll; Rita Baga; La Grande Dame; Keiona; Dawn; Venus; Tynomi Banks; Kandy Zyanide; Raja; Josh Harrison
2025	Amerie; Rebecca Black; Keisza; Haviah Mighty; Priyanka; Frost Children; Onya Nurve; Suzie Toot; Lydia B Kollins; Jewels Sparkles; Lemon; Murray Hill; Grey Matter; Throb Zombie; M1ss Jade So; Bec Sandridge; Housewife; STORRY

== Blockorama ==
First introduced to Toronto Pride festivities in 1999 by organizers of the Blackness Yes! Committee, Blockorama is an annual event created by and for BIPOC queers. Influenced by the history and politics that have shaped black and Caribbean Canadian communities, the organizers of Blockorama were concerned by the lack of safe BIPOC spaces at Toronto Pride. The event was created as a way for the queer black community to connect, but has grown over the years to include all BIPOC queers who might feel left out of the more dominant Pride events.

Between 2007 and 2010, Blockorama, the only black queer diasporic event at Pride Toronto, was moved three separate times, with each location being further from the main Pride festivities than the last. Although Blockorama has been returned to its original location at the Wellesley stage, this happened as a result of community push-back from Blackness Yes! and Black Lives Matter Toronto to the uprooting and displacement of the event.

== Third-party events ==
Like many successful Pride events worldwide, the official events are supplemented with non-official events, including the Prism Festival, now in its seventh year and featuring international DJs and all-night dance parties. The Writers' Trust of Canada formerly presented its annual Dayne Ogilvie Prize, a literary award for LGBTQ writers, during Pride Month, although it later diversified to hold its gala at locations throughout Canada, and is now presented as part of the Writers' Trust's regular slate of literary awards in October.

== See also ==
- Amy Gottlieb
