= David Douglas Kelley =

Canadian LGBTQ and AIDS activist

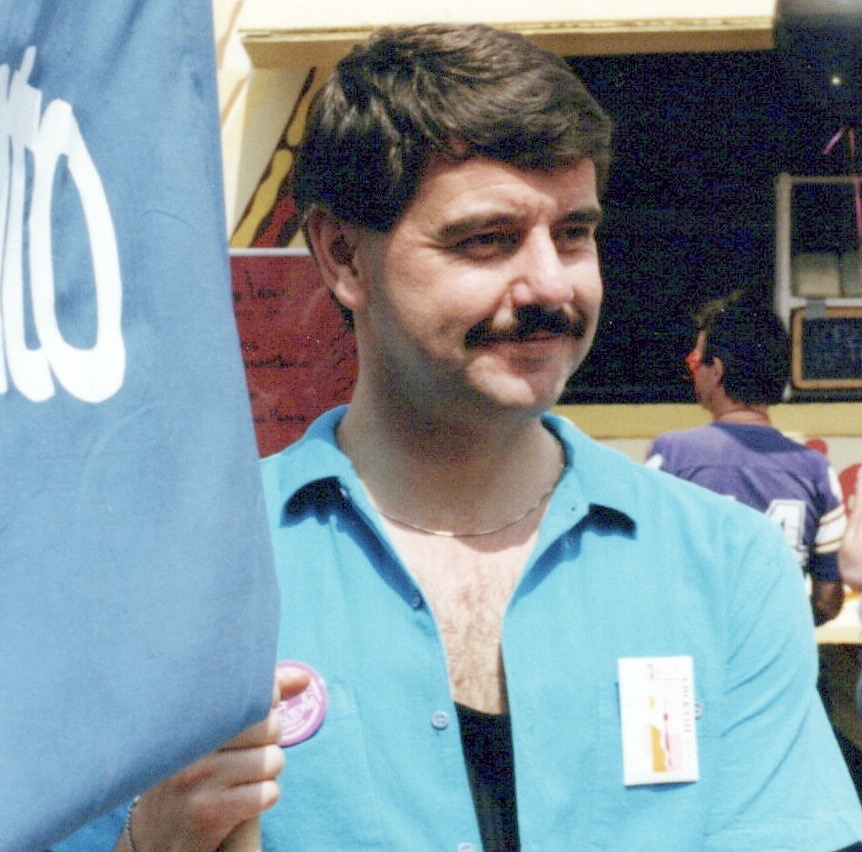
- Born: May 4, 1951; Aylmer, Quebec, Canada
- Died: April 25, 1996 (aged 44); Toronto, Ontario, Canada
- Cause of death: AIDS
- Occupation: LGBTQ+ rights activist
- Partner: Tom Stewart (1948–2020)

David Douglas Kelley (May 4, 1951 – April 25, 1996) was a Canadian LGBTQ rights activist and organizer, AIDS educator, and youth worker.

Kelley was co-founder of multiple LGBTQ+ organizations and was appointed Executive Director of the Toronto People with AIDS Foundation, the Project Officer with the Ontario Ministry of Health's AIDS Bureau, and Co-chair of the Ontario Advisory Committee on HIV/AIDS.

Kelley was presented with the Honorary Pink Trillium Humanitarian Award. His portrait was inducted into The ArQuives: Canada's LGBTQ2+ Archives National Portrait Collection, and he played the title role in the film Michael, A Gay Son.

== Early life and education ==
David Douglas Kelley was born in 1951 in Aylmer, Quebec, and he graduated from Carleton University in Ottawa in 1972.

== Career ==
Kelley started his career in the 1970s at the Youth Services Bureau of Ottawa, and then in 1977, he was a field worker for the Central Toronto Youth Services. In 1982, he began work as a child advocate for the Ontario Ministry of Community and Social Services.

In 1981, Kelley co-founded the Toronto Counselling Centre for Lesbian & Gays (TCCLG), now known as the David Kelley Services Program. The DKS Program was established in 1996 after TCCLG merged with Family Service Toronto to help empower people living with and affected by HIV/AIDS.

Kelley joined the Ontario Ministry of Health's AIDS Bureau, in 1991, as Project Officer.

In 1993, Kelley was appointed Executive Director of Toronto People with AIDS (PWA) Foundation, until his retirement due to "declining health."

== Volunteer work and activism ==
Kelley volunteered as a founder and participant in numerous organizations such as Coalition for Services for Gay and Lesbian Youth, Gay & Lesbians in Health Care, Toronto Area Gays and Lesbians – a peer counselling phone service, the AIDS Committee of Toronto and HIV Mental Health Group – a forum for discussion and support among hospital and community social service workers.

In 1992, Kelley co-founded Positive Youth Outreach, a youth-run group providing support, education and advocacy for HIV+ adolescents and young adults. At the time of his death, Kelley was Co-chair of Ontario Advisory Committee on HIV/AIDS, appointed by Hon. Jim Wilson, Ontario Minister of Health.

== Awards and honours ==
In 1994, Kelley was presented with the Honorary Pink Trillium Humanitarian Award in recognition of his contribution to the lesbian and gay community.

In 2003, Kelley was posthumously inducted into the Canadian Lesbian and Gay Archives (now The ArQuives) National Portrait Collection. The portrait artist was Barbara Augustine.

== Media and live appearances ==
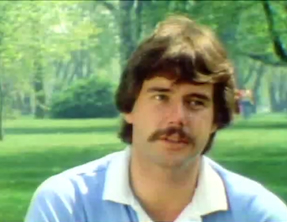
Kelley in the title role of Michael, A Gay Son

Kelley played the title role in Bruce Glawson's 16 mm docu-drama Michael, A Gay Son. The film won Best Documentary at the 16th Yorkton Film Festival in 1980, and the Blue Ribbon for top film in the Human Sexuality Category at the 23rd Annual American Film Festival in New York City in 1981. It was one of the first independent gay films to be broadcast on TVOntario and to be distributed by the National Film Board of Canada. Throughout the 1980s, the film received wide educational distribution in high schools and postsecondary institutions across Canada and the United States.

In February 1982, during Gay and Lesbian Awareness Week, St. Michael’s College at the University of Toronto prohibited a gay group from screening Michael, A Gay Son in its auditorium. The film was deemed inappropriate for a Roman Catholic institution.

In the 1980s, Kelley performed in live productions of the Fruit Cocktail variety revues as a fundraiser for the Lesbian and Gay Appeal of Toronto, now Community One Foundation.

Throughout the 1980s and 1990s, Kelley was "a frequent guest on (sex educator) Sue Johanson's various Talking Sex With Sue radio and TV call-in shows." He also educated students in classrooms across Canada about being gay and HIV positive.

== Death ==
In July 1988, Kelley tested positive for the HIV virus. On April 25, 1996, he died at Sunnybrook Health Science Centre in Toronto at age 44 from complications due to AIDS. His partner of 19 years Tom Stewart was at his side.

Four days following Kelley's death, Toronto mayor Barbara Hall declared at a city council meeting, "David didn't want to die of AIDS, but he was adamant that when he did die, everyone must know it was AIDS-related. His valiant battle with AIDS, and his endless commitment and energy, inspired all who knew him. Our city has lost a great citizen."
