= Jacobus Kloppers =

Canadian composer, musicologist and organist

Jacobus (Kobie) Kloppers (born 1937) is a Canadian composer, musicologist and organist. He has composed many notable pieces, especially for organ, and has been the subject of substantial scholarship.

== Biography ==
Born in South Africa, Kloppers completed his Doctorate in Frankfurt, Germany. In 1966, Kloppers returned to South Africa to teach, compose and perform. He immigrated to Canada with his family in the mid-1970s in protest to the Apartheid policy.

Kloppers settled in Edmonton, Alberta, Canada, and worked as a private instructor and church musician. In 1978, he was interviewed for a part-time position at a small Christian college, The King's University (Edmonton), that was to open the next year. The college hired him full-time to develop a music program. He taught organ, music history, and musicology and was chair of the music program until his retirement in 2008. Kloppers is also an adjunct professor of organ at the University of Alberta, an honorary fellow of the RCCO, the Canadian Music Centre and a member of the Canadian League of Composers.

Kloppers was important in Edmonton's Winspear Centre acquiring the Davis Concert Organ, a world-renowned instrument.

In 2009, Kloppers was inducted into Edmonton's Cultural Hall of Fame. In 2011, the University of the Free State began a project to collect and house a complete collection of Kloppers' work.
