= Jovette Marchessault =

Canadian writer and artist (1938–2012)

- Born: February 9, 1938; Montreal, Quebec
- Died: December 31, 2012 (aged 74)
- Occupations: novelist, playwright, artist
- Writing career
- Period: 1970s–2000s
- Notable works: La Terre est trop courte, Violette Leduc; Le Voyage magnifique d'Emily Carr

Jovette Marchessault (French: [ʒɔvɛt maʁʃeso]) (February 9, 1938 – December 31, 2012) was a Canadian writer and artist from Quebec, who worked in a variety of literary and artistic domains including novels, poetry, drama, painting and sculpture. An important pioneer of lesbian and feminist literature and art in Canada, many of her most noted works were inspired by other real-life women in literature and art, including Violette Leduc, Gertrude Stein and Alice B. Toklas, Emily Carr, Anaïs Nin and Helena Blavatsky.

== Career ==
Born in Montreal, Marchessault worked in a textile factory in her youth before travelling extensively in the late 1950s on a journey of self-discovery that would inform much of her work. By 1970, she was regularly exhibiting artwork in Montreal, Toronto, New York City, Paris and Brussels. She published her first novel, Le Crachat solaire, in 1975; this would be the first volume in her Comme une enfant de la terre trilogy, which also included the novels La Mère des herbes (1981) and Des Cailloux blancs pour les forêts obscures (1987). As a playwright, she published numerous plays; her early works Les Vaches de nuit, Les Faiseuses d'anges and Chronique lesbienne du moyen-âge québécois were also republished in 1980 in one volume as Triptyque lesbien.

Marchessault contributed as a journalist to publications such as Le Devoir, Châtelaine, La Vie en rose, La Nouvelle barre du jour, Fireweed and 13 Moon. She co-founded the publishing house Squawtach Press, and was a lecturer in the theater department at the Université du Québec à Montréal.

== Awards and honours ==
Marchessault's play La Terre est trop courte, Violette Leduc was a nominee for French-language Drama at the 1982 Governor General's Awards, and her play Le Voyage magnifique d'Emily Carr won the award at the 1990 Governor General's Awards.

She was inducted into the Conseil des arts et des lettres du Québec in 1993. A portrait of Marchessault, by artist Robert Laliberté, is held by The ArQuives: Canada's LGBTQ2+ Archives' National Portrait Collection, in honor of her role as a builder of LGBT culture and history in Canada.

== Works ==
=== Novels (The Comme une enfant de la terre trilogy) ===
- Le Crachat solaire (1975)
- La Mère des herbes (1981)
- Des Cailloux blancs dans des forêts obscures (1987)

=== Plays ===
- Alice & Gertrude, Natalie et Renée, et ce cher Ernest
- Demande de travail sur les nébuleuses
- Le Pérégrin chérubinique
- La Saga des poules mouillées
- La Terre est trop courte, Violette Leduc
- Anaïs dans la queue de la comète
- Le Lion de Bangor
- Madame Blavatsky, spirite
- Lazare de Miramichi
- Le Repos des pluies
- Le Voyage magnifique d'Emily Carr
- Les Faiseuses d'anges
