= Gens Hellquist =

Canadian activist and publisher

Gens Douglas Hellquist (October 12, 1946 – September 28, 2013) was a Canadian activist and publisher, noted for his prominent role in founding and developing the organized LGBT community in the province of Saskatchewan.

== Background ==
Born in North Battleford and raised in Saskatoon, he was working in social services in Saskatoon in 1971. With no visible LGBT community in the city, in that year he placed a classified advertisement in the Vancouver newspaper The Georgia Straight seeking other people interested in forming a gay group.

== Saskatoon Gay Action ==
He soon received two responses, and the three men soon established a Saskatoon chapter of the Gay Liberation Front. As membership increased, the group expanded its activities to include both political lobbying and social activities. In 1972 the group formally incorporated as the Zodiac Friendship Society, an umbrella organization which was parent to the Gemini Club for social events and Saskatoon Gay Action for the political work. The social events raised funds toward the creation of a gay community centre in the city, which was established in 1973 as only the second such institution in all of Canada.

In a 1973 interview with The Body Politic, Hellquist said that "I really believe that Gay Lib will be won in the smaller centres of Canada. In a small city they can't ignore you as easily."

In 2005, the Saskatchewan Human Rights Tribunal relied on expert testimony from Hellquist in finding that four pamphlets which had been publicly distributed in Regina and Saskatoon breached the hate publication provision of the Saskatchewan Human Rights Code. Hellquist had been called as an expert witness by the Saskatchewan Human Rights Commission on the impact of the pamphlets on the gay community. In Saskatchewan Human Rights Commission v Whatcott, the Supreme Court of Canada ultimately upheld the Tribunal's ruling with respect to two of the pamphlets.

== Journalism ==
In 1983, Hellquist established the city's LGBT magazine Perceptions, serving as its first publisher and editor. He was also a contributor to other LGBT and activist publications, including The Body Politic, Xtra! and Briarpatch.

== Health activism ==
Hellquist was also active on LGBT health issues, including HIV/AIDS. He was a founding member of Gay and Lesbian Health Services of Saskatoon (now known as the Avenue Community Centre for Gender and Sexual Diversity) and the Canadian Rainbow Health Coalition, and served on the boards of the Canadian AIDS Society and the Saskatchewan AIDS Network. Within the Avenue Community Centre, he served as executive director of the institution's programs dedicated to gay men's health.

== Death ==
Hellquist died on September 28, 2013, just days before his 67th birthday. He had just recently been diagnosed with cancer, although no source has formally confirmed whether that was his cause of death.

Memorial services for Hellquist were held at both the Roxy Theatre in Saskatoon and The ArQuives: Canada's LGBTQ2+ Archives in Toronto. Cam Broten, the leader of the Saskatchewan New Democratic Party, was in attendance at the Saskatoon event, telling the media that "we’ve come a long way in Saskatchewan when we talk about equality and about rights for everyone in the province, and it’s because of people who stood up over the years and worked hard for everyone and Gens is one of those people."

== Honours ==
Hellquist was awarded the Saskatchewan Centennial Medal in June 2005 for his activist work. In 2010, he was inducted into the Q Hall of Fame Canada, and was presented with the Peter Corren Award for Outstanding Achievement by the University of Saskatchewan.

A portrait of Hellquist, by artist Duncan Campbell, is held by The ArQuives: Canada's LGBTQ2+ Archives in its National Portrait Collection.
