= Cynthia Petersen =

Canadian lawyer and judge

Ontario Superior Court of Justice
- Incumbent
- Assumed office June 2017

Cynthia Petersen is a Canadian lawyer and judge. Petersen has been a judge for the Ontario Superior Court of Justice since June 2017. Before becoming a judge, Petersen was the Discrimination and Harassment Counsel for the Law Society of Upper Canada from 2002 to 2017. In 2011, Petersen was inducted into the Q Hall of Fame Canada.

== Education ==
In 1989, Petersen graduated with a law degree at Queen's University and went to Harvard Law School to complete a master's degree in 1990.

== Career ==
After completing her education, Petersen taught at the University of Ottawa from 1990 to 1995. While teaching at the University of Ottawa, she was a part of the Egan v Canada Supreme Court of Canada case as an intervenor. After leaving the university, Petersen became a lawyer for the law firm Goldblatt Partners LLP in 1995. While working at Goldbatt, Petersen became the Discrimination and Harassment Counsel of the Law Society of Upper Canada in 2002. For Goldbatt, Petersen was a part of multiple Court of Appeal for Ontario cases including Halpern v Canada (AG) in 2003 and Canada (AG) v Bedford in 2012.

Outside of the Ontario Court of Appeal, Petersen was selected by Prime Minister Justin Trudeau in 2014 to look into the sexual allegations against former Members of Parliament Massimo Pacetti and Scott Andrews. In 2017, Petersen's time as Discrimination and Harassment Counsel ended when she came a member of the Ontario Superior Court of Justice in June 2017. She began her Superior Court career as a judge in Brampton, Ontario and took over Meredith Donohue's position.

== Awards and honours ==
Petersen was inducted into the Q Hall of Fame Canada in 2011.
