= 8th Lambda Literary Awards =

1996 literary awards ceremony

The 8th Lambda Literary Awards were held in 1996 to honour works of LGBT literature published in 1995.

== Special awards ==
Category	Winner
Editor's Choice	Patrick Califia and Janine Fuller, Forbidden Passages: Writings Banned in Canada
Pioneer Award	L. Page “Deacon” Maccubbin, Lambda Rising
Publisher's Service	Nancy Bereano, Firebrand Press; Janine Fuller and Stuart Blackley, Restricted Entry: Censorship on Trial

== Nominees and winners ==
8th Lambda Literary Awards winners and finalists
Category	Author/Editor	Title	Result
Anthologies (Fiction)	E. J. Levy (ed.)	Tasting Life Twice	Winner
Anthologies (Fiction)	Pat Califia and Janine Fuller	Forbidden Passages: Writings Banned in Canada	Finalist
Anthologies (Fiction)	Robert Drake	His	Finalist
Anthologies (Fiction)	Catherine McKinley and ` (eds.)	Afrekete	Finalist
Anthologies (Fiction)	Eileen Myles and Liz Kotz (eds.)	The New Fuck You	Finalist
Anthologies (Non-Fiction)	Claude J. Summers (ed.)	Gay and Lesbian Literary Heritage	Winner
Anthologies (Non-Fiction)	Karla Jay (ed.)	Dyke Life	Finalist
Anthologies (Non-Fiction)	Leslea Newman (ed.)	A Loving Testimony	Finalist
Anthologies (Non-Fiction)	Lynn Witt, Sherry Thomas, and Eric Marcus (eds.)	Out in All Directions	Finalist
Anthologies (Non-Fiction)	Lynn Yamaguchi and Karin Barber (eds.)	Tomboys	Finalist
Children's and Young Adult	Jacqueline Woodson	From the Notebooks of Melanin Sun	Winner
Children's and Young Adult	Francesca Lia Block	Baby Bebop	Finalist
Children's and Young Adult	Kurt Chandler	Passages of Pride	Finalist
Children's and Young Adult	Daniel Vilmure	Toby’s Lie	Finalist
Children's and Young Adult	Judith Vinga	My Two Uncles	Finalist
Drama	Tony Kushner	Slavs (Thinking About the Longstanding Problems of Virtue and Happiness)	Winner
Drama	Guinevere Turner and Rose Troche	Go Fish	Winner
Drama	Michael Kearns	T-Cells and Sympathy	Finalist
Drama	Eric Lane and Nina Shengold (eds.)	The Actor’s Book of Gay and Lesbian Plays	Finalist
Drama	Terrence McNally	Love! Valour! Compassion!	Finalist
Gay Biography and Autobiography	Lyle Leverich	Tom: The Unknown Tennessee Williams	Winner
Gay Biography and Autobiography	Leroy F. Aarons	Prayers for Bobby: A Mother's Coming to Terms with the Suicide of Her Gay Son	Finalist
Gay Biography and Autobiography	Bill T. Jones and Peggy Gillespie	Last Night on Earth	Finalist
Gay Biography and Autobiography	Gore Vidal	Palimpsesta	Finalist
Gay Biography and Autobiography	Edmund White	Our Paris	Finalist
Gay Fiction	Michael Cunningham	Flesh and Blood	Winner
Gay Fiction	Christopher Bram	Father of Frankenstein	Finalist
Gay Fiction	Jim Grimsley	Dream Boy	Finalist
Gay Fiction	Scott Heim	Mysterious Skin	Finalist
Gay Fiction	Felice Picano	Like People in History	Finalist
Gay Mystery	R. D. Zimmerman	Closet	Winner
Gay Mystery	George Baxt	Queer Kind of Umbrella	Finalist
Gay Mystery	Steven Saylor	The Venus Throw	Finalist
Gay Mystery	Richard Stevenson	Shock to the System	Finalist
Gay Mystery	Mark Richard Zubro	Another Dead Teenager	Finalist
Gay Poetry	Mark Doty	Atlantis	Winner
Gay Poetry	David Laurents	Badboy Book of Erotic Verse	Finalist
Gay Poetry	Timothy Liu	Burnt Offerings	Finalist
Gay Poetry	James Merrill	Scattering of Salts	Finalist
Gay Poetry	Carl Phillips	Cortege	Finalist
Gay Studies	Joseph Carrier	De Los Otros	Winner
Gay Studies	Daniel Halperin	Saint=Foucault	Finalist
Gay Studies	Jonathan Ned Katz	The Invention of Heterosexuality	Finalist
Gay Studies	Pierre Seel	I, Pierre Seel, Deported Homosexual	Finalist
Gay Studies	Andrew Sullivan	Virtually Normal	Finalist
Humor	Ellen Orleans	The Butches of Madison County	Winner
Humor	Alison Bechdel	Unnatural Dykes to Watch Out For	Finalist
Humor	Diane DiMassa	Revenge of HotHead Paisan	Finalist
Humor	Funny Gay Males	Growing Up Gay: From Left Out to Coming Out	Finalist
Humor	Mabel Maney	Ghost in the Closet	Finalist
Lesbian Biography and Autobiography	Erica Fischer	Aimee & Jaguar	Winner
Lesbian Biography and Autobiography	Dorothy Allison	Two or Three Things I Know for Sure	Finalist
Lesbian Biography and Autobiography	Claudia Brenner and Hannah Ashley	Eight Bullets: One Woman's Story of Surviving Anti-Gay Violence	Finalist
Lesbian Biography and Autobiography	Susan E. Cayliff	Babe	Finalist
Lesbian Biography and Autobiography	Deb Price and Joyce Murdoch	And Say Hi to Joyce	Finalist
Lesbian Fiction	Jacqueline Woodson	Autobiography of a Family Photo	Winner
Lesbian Fiction	Lucy Jane Bledsoe	Sweat	Finalist
Lesbian Fiction	Louise Blum	Amnesty	Finalist
Lesbian Fiction	Stephanie Grant	Passion of Alice	Finalist
Lesbian Fiction	Sarah Schulman	Rat Bohemia	Finalist
Lesbian Mystery	Jean M. Redmann	Intersection of Law and Desire	Winner
Lesbian Mystery	Ellen Hart	Faint Praise	Finalist
Lesbian Mystery	Jaye Maiman	Someone to Watch	Finalist
Lesbian Mystery	Penny Mickelbury	Night Songs	Finalist
Lesbian Mystery	Elizabeth Pincus	Hangdog Hustle	Finalist
Lesbian Poetry	Adrienne Rich	Dark Fields of the Republic	Winner
Lesbian Poetry	Chrystos	Fire Power	Finalist
Lesbian Poetry	Jewelle Gomez	Oral Tradition	Finalist
Lesbian Poetry	Eileen Myles	Maxfield Parrish	Finalist
Lesbian Poetry	Gerry Gomez Pearlberg	Key to Everything	Finalist
Lesbian Studies	Karla Jay	Dyke Life	Winner
Lesbian Studies	Julie Glamuzina and Alison J. Laurie	Parker and Hulme	Finalist
Lesbian Studies	Minnie Bruce Pratt	S/he	Finalist
Lesbian Studies	Urvashi Vaid	Virtual Equality	Finalist
Lesbian Studies	Lynn Yamaguchi and Karin Barber	Tomboys	Finalist
Photography and Visual Arts	Andrea Weiss	Paris Was a Woman	Winner
Photography and Visual Arts	Emmanuel Cooper	Fully Exposed: The Male Nude in Photography	Finalist
Photography and Visual Arts	Howard Cruse	Stuck Rubber Baby	Finalist
Photography and Visual Arts	Geoff Manasse and Jean Swallow	Making Love Visible	Finalist
Photography and Visual Arts	M.G. Soares	Butch/Femme	Finalist
Science fiction, fantasy or horror	Nicola Griffith	Slow River	Winner
Science fiction, fantasy or horror	Melissa Scott	Shadow Man	Winner
Science fiction, fantasy or horror	Samuel R. Delany	Atlantis: Three Tales	Finalist
Science fiction, fantasy or horror	Pam Keesey	Dark Angels	Finalist
Science fiction, fantasy or horror	Felice Picano	Dryland’s End	Finalist
Small Press	Eileen Myles and Liz Kotz	The New Fuck You	Winner
Small Press	Staszek	Three-Hand Jax and Other Spells	Finalist
Small Press	Adam Klein	The Medicine Burns	Finalist
Small Press	Minnie Bruce Pratt	S/He	Finalist
Small Press	Vega Press	Milking Black Bull	Finalist
Spirituality	Brian Bouldrey	Wrestling with the Angel	Winner
Spirituality	Peter Cashorali	Gay Fairy Tales	Finalist
Spirituality	John J. McNeill	Freedom, Glorious Freedom	Finalist
Spirituality	Will Roscoe	Queer Spirits	Finalist
Spirituality	Nancy Wilson	Our Tribe	Finalist
