= Janine Fuller =

Canadian businessperson and writer (born 1958)

Janine Fuller CM
- Born: 1958 (age 67–68); Toronto, Ontario, Canada
- Occupations: businessperson, writer
- Known for: advocating for gender equality
- Notable work: Restricted Entry: Censorship on Trial (co-author)

Janine Elizabeth Fuller CM (born 1958) is a Canadian businessperson and writer. She was the manager of Little Sister's Book and Art Emporium in Vancouver, British Columbia, and is best known for her role as an anti-censorship activist in the bookstore's battles with Canada Customs, which culminated in the Supreme Court of Canada case Little Sisters Book and Art Emporium v. Canada (Minister of Justice) in 2004.

Born and raised in Toronto, Ontario, Fuller began advocating for gender equality at a young age, fighting to be allowed to start a girls' soccer team in Grade 6. She was later an employee of the Toronto Women's Bookstore, and was working there when the store was firebombed in 1983. She moved to Vancouver in 1989, taking a job at Little Sister's the following year, and became an active fundraiser and freedom of expression activist as the store was drawn into legal battles when Canada Customs regularly confiscated and impounded its shipments from publishers.

Following a diagnosis with Huntington's disease in the late 2000s, Fuller has also become an activist and speaker on issues relating to the condition.

== Writing ==
In 1995, she coauthored with Stuart Blackley the book Restricted Entry: Censorship on Trial, a non-fiction account of the Little Sister's battle, and wrote an introduction for Forbidden Passages: Writings Banned in Canada, an anthology of excerpts from some of the impounded works which was edited by Patrick Califia.

Fuller has also written a number of plays, and has worked as a performance artist.

== Awards ==
Both Restricted Entry and Forbidden Passages won Lammies at the 8th Lambda Literary Awards in 1996, Forbidden Passages in the "Editor's Choice" category and Restricted Entry in the "Publisher's Service" category.

In honour of her role as a significant contributor to LGBT culture and history in Canada, Fuller has been inducted into both the Q Hall of Fame Canada and The ArQuives: Canada's LGBTQ2+ Archives' National Portrait Collection. She was also awarded an honorary Doctorate of Laws by Simon Fraser University in 2004, the inaugural Reg Robson Award from the British Columbia Civil Liberties Association in 1997, the Freedom to Read Award from the Writers' Union of Canada in 2002, as well as awards from numerous women's and LGBT organizations.

In 2024, she was appointed to the Order of Canada.
