= Amy Gottlieb =

Canadian activist and educator

- Born: 1953; New York City, New York, U.S
- Died: July 27, 2023 (aged 69–70)
- Education: Trent University (BA)
- Occupations: Queer activist, artist, educator

Amy Gottlieb (1953 – July 27, 2023) was a Canadian queer activist, artist and educator. She was one of the organizers of the first Pride Toronto (then called Lesbian and Gay Pride Day) in 1981. She was also an organizer of the Dykes on the Street March, organized by Lesbians Against the Right, which occurred in October of the same year.

== Biography ==
Gottlieb was born in New York City in 1953. She arrived in Canada in 1972 to finish university, attaining a Bachelor of Arts in Sociology from Trent University. Since the early 1970s, she was involved in socialist and feminist activism. Gottlieb's political involvement started with the peace movement and the civil rights movement. She met her first lesbian lover in 1973 and soon began to dedicate herself to queer causes as well. Subsequently, Gottlieb was active in numerous queer, Jewish, and artistic causes, including the Lesbian Organization of Toronto (LOOT), the Jewish Women's Committee to End the Occupation of the West Bank and Gaza, and MIX: the Magazine of Artist-Run Culture.

In June 1981, she spoke at The Toronto Marxist Institute with Gary Kinsman and Tim McCaskell at the public forum titled "Strange Bedfellows: Lesbians, Gays, and the left".

In 1998, Gottlieb's portrait was painted for The ArQuives.

In 2017, Gottlieb published an essay discussing her experiences as an organizer of Toronto's first lesbian march titled "Toronto’s Unrecognized First Dyke March" in Any Other Way: How Toronto Got Queer (Coach House Books).

In 2020, the Rise Up Feminist Archive published an interview with Gottlieb and well known feminists Sue Colley and Meg Luxton about becoming feminist activists.

In 2022, The Globe and Mail published a first person account of Gottlieb's battle with cancer.

In 2023, Spacing magazine interviewed Gottlieb about the early years of Pride organizing in Toronto and protesting the bath house raids.

Gottlieb died of lymphoma on July 27, 2023.

== Video and photography ==
Gottlieb's artistic work explored family history, and the relationship between personal and historical memory. Her 1997 award-winning video "In Living Memory" screened at festivals across North America and on television. "Tempest in a Teapot", a 1987 video about Gottlieb’s mother and her radical political activities, screened at five Toronto festivals and was exhibited at Toronto's A Space Gallery. Gottlieb's 2010 photo-based work, "FBI Family", speaks to state surveillance. Gottlieb's photomontages are layered images combining her mother’s FBI surveillance files with family photographs.
