= Marie Robertson (activist) =

Canadian LGBT rights activist

- Born: 1952 (age 73–74); Hamilton, Ontario
- Occupation: LGBT rights activist

Marie Robertson (born 1952) is a Canadian LGBT rights activist. Robertson was a co-founder of multiple LGBT agencies and worked as a counsellor for the AIDS Committee of Toronto. Robertson's portrait was inducted into The ArQuives: Canada's LGBTQ2+ Archives in 2002 and she was inducted into the Q Hall of Fame Canada in 2013.

== Early life and education ==
Marie Robertson was born in 1952 in Hamilton, Ontario into a working-class family. After high school, she attended Hamilton Teachers' College and McMaster University. She has attended the University of Waterloo, Ryerson University and Algonquin College.

== Career ==
Robertson began her LGBT activist career as a co-founder of the Hamilton McMaster Gay Liberation Movement in 1970. While attending the University of Waterloo in 1974, she was discriminated against by a landlord on the basis of her sexual orientation. This was before gays and lesbians had any human rights protection in the province of Ontario. Despite not having any legal grounds from which to fight, she and her friends launched a media campaign against the landlord.

In 1975, Robertson and a group of other activists from different cities in Ontario started the Coalition for Lesbian and Gay Rights in Ontario. Robertson moved to Ottawa in 1975, where she was active in Gays of Ottawa and where she and other lesbians created Lesbians of Ottawa Now (LOON).

In 1984, she moved to Toronto, joined the team of volunteers at the AIDS Committee of Toronto in 1985, and in 1987 joined the staff there as a counsellor, where she worked until 1993. After leaving the AIDS Committee, Robertson became a private practice counsellor. When she returned to Ottawa in 2004, Robertson co-founded the Lesbian Information Xchange in 2005 and the Ottawa Senior Pride Network in 2008.

== Awards and honors ==
In 1994, Robertson was given the Canadian Lambda Award for Excellence in Human Rights and a portrait of her was inducted into the National Portrait Collection of The ArQuives: Canada's LGBTQ2+ Archives in 2002. In 2013, she was inducted into the Q Hall of Fame Canada.

== Personal life ==
Robertson currently lives in Ottawa where she works as a private practice counsellor and volunteers with Ottawa Senior Pride Network.
