= Forbidden Passages =

Book about censorship edited by Patrick Califia

- Forbidden Passages: Writings Banned in Canada
- Author: Patrick Califia (editor); Janine Fuller (introduction)
- Original title: Forbidden Passages: Writings Banned in Canada
- Language: English
- Subject: Censorship, freedom of speech
- Genre: Literature
- Published: 1995 (Cleis Press)
- Publication place: United States
- Media type: Paperback
- Pages: 176
- Awards: Lambda Literary Award, 1996
- ISBN: 978-1573440196
- OCLC: 33041940

Forbidden Passages: Writings Banned in Canada is a compilation book about censorship edited by Patrick Califia with an introduction by Janine Fuller. It was published in 1995 by Cleis Press. Most of the works in the book involve topics relating to LGBTQ and specifically gay and lesbian homosexuality issues.

Forbidden Passages features works seized at the Canada–United States border by the Canada Border Services Agency intended for delivery to the store Little Sister's Book and Art Emporium in Vancouver.

The book won the Lambda Literary Award in the Editor's Choice category at the 8th Lambda Literary Awards in 1996; also receiving a nomination in the anthologies category.

== Background ==
Forbidden Passages features works seized at the border between Canada and the United States by the Canada Border Services Agency which were intended for delivery to the store Little Sister's Book and Art Emporium in Vancouver. The book's proceeds went to legal costs incurred by the bookstore during its court case against the censorship by Canada, Little Sisters Book and Art Emporium v. Canada. The bookstore was close to bankruptcy at the time subsequent to anti-pornography initiatives carried out by the Canadian government.

== Publication history ==
A paperback edition of Forbidden Passages was published by Cleis Press in 1995. It was published again as an eBook the same year.

== Contents ==
The introduction by Little Sisters manager Janine Fuller explains the chronology of events surrounding the confiscation of literary works by the government of Canada that were intended for the store.

A preface to the book by Patrick Califia argues strongly against the censorship by Canada. Califia writes:

"You may not agree with many of the things I've said, or some of the positions I take in my work. Perhaps you won't like some of the passages that appear in Forbidden Passages. But don't you think you ought to have the right to read them in the first place?...If you buy only one gay or feminist book this year, it should be Forbidden Passages...Buy this book, hold a benefit, make a donation. Gag the state, before it chokes you!"

Most of the works in the book involve topics relating to LGBTQ and sexuality. Forbidden Passages includes "Egg Sex" by Susie Bright, about how pregnancy impacted her sexual wants. The book features pieces banned in Canada written by authors including: Kathy Acker, Dorothy Allison, Dennis Cooper, Marguerite Duras, bell hooks, John Preston and Jane Rule.

== Reception ==
=== Awards ===
Forbidden Passages won the Lambda Literary Award in the Editor's Choice category at the 8th Lambda Literary Awards in 1996. It also received a nomination in the anthologies category.

=== Reviews ===
Forbidden Passages received a favorable review from Publishers Weekly, which was heavily critical of the censorship by Canada. The review wrote that the prefaces about censorship written by Califia and Fuller were more crucial to the book than the literary passages included therein. The reviewer concluded "Cleis is helping by donating proceeds from the book to Little Sisters; librarians can help by stocking this informative book in all public and academic libraries in the U.S.".

== See also ==
- 8th Lambda Literary Awards
- Book censorship in Canada
- Censorship in Canada
- Freedom of speech in Canada
- List of books banned by governments
- Little Sister's Book and Art Emporium
- Little Sisters Book and Art Emporium v. Canada (Minister of Justice)
