= Q Hall of Fame =

Canadian queer hall of fame

- Formation: 2009; 17 years ago
- Founder: Paul Therien
- Location: Vancouver, British Columbia, Canada

The Q Hall of Fame Canada, also known as the Queer Hall of Fame, was a Canadian hall of fame dedicated to commemorate the history of the lesbian, gay, bisexual and transgender community in Canada. They honoured those that have been human rights pioneers and documented the accomplishments and lives of these people. Headquartered in Vancouver, British Columbia, the Q Hall of Fame was an independently registered federal not for profit organization with the Minister of Industry for Canada.

== History ==
The Q Hall of Fame Canada was created in 2009 by founder and chair Paul Therien. It was in response to what he perceived to be a lack of recognition for people who have greatly impacted the lives of LGBTQ Canadians through their dedication to human rights. It is an independent entity and is not associated directly with Qmunity in governance or management. At the inaugural induction ceremony for the Q Hall of Fame, known as Q Ball, Qmunity was the "selected beneficiary" of the 2009 proceeds and "a possible future home of the hall's memorabilia", however a recent shift in the mandate of the Hall of Fame has amended that.

Inductees for the Q Hall of Fame are selected through a public nomination process. Nominees are usually members of the LGBT community themselves, although heterosexual allies who have played prominent roles in the protection or advancement of LGBT equality rights in Canada—such as former Prime Minister Pierre Trudeau—may also be honoured.

At the 2009 induction ceremony, entertainer Robert Kaiser (also known as Joan-E) was the first inductee into the Hall of Fame, and he was followed by Olympic gold medalist Mark Tewksbury, head of the Canadian Drag Court Ted Northe, author and bookseller Janine Fuller and former Prime Minister Pierre Trudeau, for his role in decriminalising homosexuality in Canada.

Held every two years, Q Ball was held in Vancouver in 2009, and again in 2011. The 2013 Q Ball was held in Toronto. All nominations are reviewed by an independent selection committee which comprises community members from across Canada. The identities of the members of the selection committee are kept strictly confidential to ensure that they remain as unbiased as possible when reviewing the nominations.

== Inductees ==
=== 2009 ===
- Janine Fuller
- Robert Kaiser
- Ted Northe
- Mark Tewksbury
- Pierre Trudeau

=== 2011 ===
- Rick Bébout
- Karen Busby
- Jeremy Dias
- Dogwood Monarchist Society
- Gens Hellquist
- k.d. lang
- Kevin Dale McKeown
- NiQ
- Cynthia Petersen
- Mirha-Soleil Ross
- Delwin Vriend
- Garth Wiens

=== 2013 ===
- Jack Layton
- Marie Robertson
- Jane Rule
- Barbara Snelgrove
- Darrin Hagen
- Rev. Brent Hawkes
- Harold Desmarais

== See also ==
- LGBT rights in Canada
