= Robert Laliberté =

Canadian photographer (born 1951)

Robert Laliberté (born 1951) is a Canadian photographer, best known for his male nudes. Originally from Quebec City, Quebec, he has lived and worked in Montreal since 1975.

== Work ==
His photographs of male nudes, evoking the works of Herb Ritts and Robert Mapplethorpe, made him known in Canada and abroad. He is considered the "flagship photographer " of the gay community of Montreal and a major player in the emergence of gay culture in Montreal. He was the official photographer of the magazine Fugues for twelve years (1984–1996).

Laliberté also worked as a photographer in the theater and explored other themes, such as street scenes or portraits of old people.

== Exhibitions and awards ==
Laliberté presented his work in over 20 exhibitions and several publications in Canada and abroad. He was awarded the prix Arc-en-ciel pour la culture in 2002. That same year, the Ecomuseum du fier monde (Montreal) devoted a retrospective of his career.

A portrait of Laliberté by artist Zilon is held by The ArQuives: Canada's LGBTQ2+ Archives' National Portrait Collection, in honour of Laliberté's role as a significant builder of LGBT culture and history in Canada. Laliberté was also the portrait artist for another inductee in the same collection, writer and artist Jovette Marchessault.
