= King's University (Canada) =

Private Christian university in Edmonton, Canada

Coordinates: 53°31′31″N 113°25′3″W

The King's University
- Motto: "Teaching Each Other in All Wisdom"
- Type: Liberal arts college
- Established: 1979
- Affiliations: Ecumenical
- Endowment: CA$1,863,967
- President: Melanie J. Humphreys
- Faculty: 120
- Students: 686 (2023-24 fulltime equivalent)
- Location: Edmonton, Alberta, Canada
- Campus: Urban, 20 acres (8.09 ha)
- Colours: Blue, Gold
- Mascot: Eagle
- Website: http://www.kingsu.ca/

The King's University in Edmonton, Alberta, Canada, is a Canadian Christian university offering bachelor's degrees in the arts, humanities, music, social sciences, natural sciences, business, and education. King's is one of 26 publicly funded post-secondary institutions in Alberta. The university serves more than 900 students from across Canada and abroad, representing more than 16 nations.

== History ==
On November 16, 1979, the Alberta Legislature approved the King's College Act which granted a charter to the King's College. King's was founded, by the Christian College Association (Alberta) as the King's College.

In December 1970, a constitution, and statement of principles gave written expression to their vision of Christian Higher education. The enabling legislation is the Post-secondary Learning Act.

On November 2, 1983, an official affiliation agreement was signed with the University of Alberta, ensuring that the great majority of courses at King's would transfer automatically to the University and making various University resources, such as the library and curriculum labs, available to college students. In 1987, the King's College was given the right to grant its first accredited degree, a three-year BA, with concentrations in a number of disciplines. Since then, it has been authorized to offer many other degree programs, as listed in this calendar.

In the summer of 1993, the college moved into its first permanent campus. In November of that year, the Alberta legislature approved the bill changing the college's name to the King's University College. In November 2015, the Alberta legislature passed a private member's bill changing the name to "the King's University".

King's partners with other Canadian organizations to provide education opportunities to students. Most notably, in 2011 The King’s Environmental Studies (ENVS) Program was granted professional accreditation from Environmental Careers Organization ECO Canada, the certifying body of the Canadian Environmental Accreditation Commission (CEAC). In 2013, King's signed an agreement with Newman Theological College to offer Bachelor of Education students the religious education courses necessary to be eligible for a continuous contract with Edmonton Catholic School District.

In 2013, King's inaugurated the fourth President Melanie J. Humphreys. Humphreys took office on July 2, 2013, after the retirement of President Emeritus J Harry Fernhout (2005–2013). Fernhout was preceded by Henk Van Andel (1985–2005) and founding President Sidney DeWaal (1979–1983).

== Programs ==
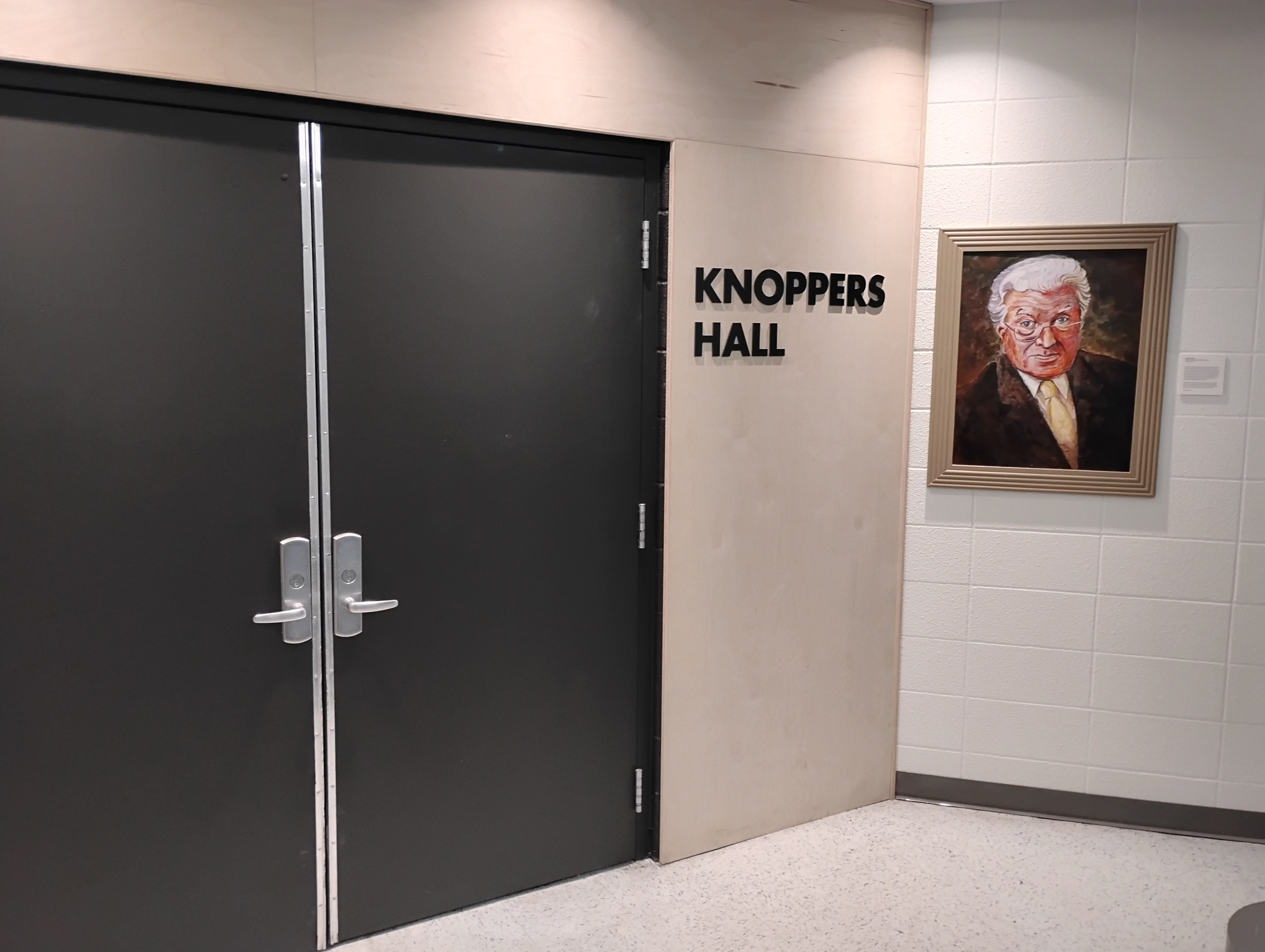
Named after Nicolaas B. Knoppers, Knoppers Hall is used for musical recitals

Students can enroll in over 650 courses across 37 disciplines. The King's University offers three-year and four-year bachelor's degrees in the arts, humanities, social sciences, natural sciences, and commerce, as well as a two-year Bachelor of Education after-degree. Prominent programs include the Environmental Studies program and the Politics-History-Economics (PHE) combined major. Currently, the university has over 900 students enrolled in Bachelor of Arts, Bachelor of Science, Bachelor of Music, Bachelor of Commerce and Bachelor of Education programs. The King's University accepts academically qualified students of all faiths into its programs.

== Research ==
Training of undergraduates in laboratory, field, or literary research, is figured prominently at King's. Many projects are collaborative with other universities, non-government organizations, community groups, or international partnerships. The King's Centre for Visualization in Science is developing computer-based teaching tools for high school science teachers to simulate properties and processes in chemistry and physics. Research with implications for social policy includes Alberta's oil sands, pluriformity in Alberta's public education system and national delivery of men's health services. Sustainability in business, communities, and resource-based livelihoods in Africa is the research focus of international partnerships with non-government organizations and other universities.

== Simona Maaskant Library ==
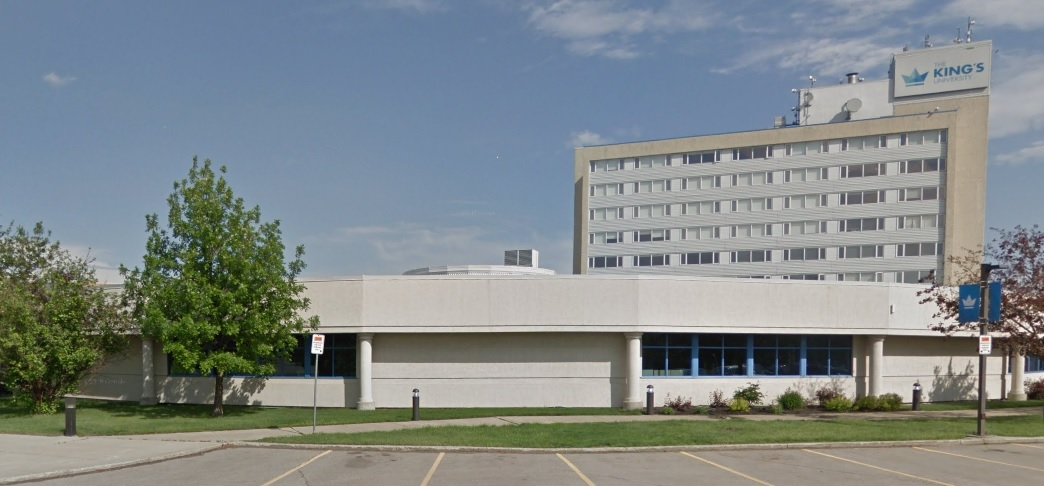
Exterior view of the Simona Maaskant Library

The King's University library was renamed the Simona Maaskant Library in 1998, after its chief librarian Simona Maaskant. The Simona Maaskant Library contains over 75,000 physical materials (books and audiovisual materials) and 200,000 electronic materials.

The Simona Maaskant Library also includes a special collections and archives division called The Gerry Segger Heritage Collection. The collection acts as a research centre for archival materials associated with Dutch-Canadians.

== Micah Centre ==
The Micah Centre is focused on transformational development and social justice aims to provide students with further transformative experiences that shape their educational and vocational choices. The Micah Centre hosts the Interdisciplinary Studies Conference, a two-day conference held in the Fall and Winter semesters. Past topics include: Truth and Reconciliation Commission, Economics and Christian Desire, Culture Making, and The Alberta Oilsands.

The Micah Centre also coordinates The Honduras Water Project, recipients of Alberta's Award of Distinction for Internationalizing the Teaching and Learning Practice, annually sends service-learning teams to a remote Honduran village to both learn about poverty and development firsthand, and work alongside residents in constructing a community water system. Recent Micah internships with global NGO partners have emphasized community organization (Bangladesh), HIV/AIDs (Tanzania), and environmental sustainability (Kenya).

== International studies ==
King's partners with more than 25 off-campus study programs in various locations including the Au Sable Institute of Environmental Studies (India, USA), Netherlandic Study Program, China Studies, Russia Studies, Middle East Studies, Film Studies (Los Angeles), and Uganda Studies. International students are eligible for campus employment in university research projects, the library, facility and grounds department, Tamil studies, and food services, among others.

== Statistics ==
(as of Spring 2021)

- Enrollment: 910
- Post-graduate employment rate within 2 years: 98%
- Student Scholarships and Awards Available each year: $660,000
- Student to Faculty Ratio: 9:1
- Male to Female Ratio: 5:7
- Faculty and sessional instructors: 96
- Countries represented in student body: 47 (10% International Students)
- Number of alumni: 6,500+

== Rankings and distinctions ==
For the last five years, King's has been a leader in its sector with "top of the class" grades for Student-Faculty Interaction, Class Size, Quality of Teaching, and Most Satisfied Student in The Globe and Mail Canadian University Report. It was also named best small university in Canada by Maclean's magazine for several years running. King's was named Most Supportive Campus Environment of any Canadian Institution, as measured by the National Survey of Student Engagement, and is in the top ten per cent of all colleges and universities in North America.

King's received an A+ rating for overall student satisfaction on the Globe and Mail 2008, 2009, 2010, 2011 and 2012 Canadian University Reports.

== Athletics ==
The King's University Eagles compete in the Alberta Colleges Athletics Conference. Team sports include basketball, soccer/futsal, badminton, and volleyball.

In the 2008–2009 season, the women's basketball team won their first-ever bronze medal.

== Campus ==
King's buildings have floor area of 21,000 square metres (226,042 sq ft) on a site of 80,000 square metres (861,113 sq ft). Facilities include: 34 classrooms, eight science labs, three computer labs, a greenhouse, fine arts studios, a performance hall with Letourneau pipe organ and Glenn Gould piano, 1,200 m^{2} (12,917 sq ft) library, 900 m^{2} (9,688 sq ft) gymnasium, spacious cafeteria, drama space, conference rooms, atrium assembly space, outdoor sports fields, and two student residences.

=== Equal-rights case ===
In the early 1990s, the King's University drew attention due to a controversial decision to fire an employee (Delwin Vriend, a lab assistant) because of his sexual orientation. At the time, the Alberta Individual Rights Protection Act did not cover discrimination based on sexual orientation, and the Human Rights Commission did not want to investigate it. Vriend took his case against the province of Alberta to court, which decided in 1994 that sexual orientation should be added to the act, a decision appealed by the government and overturned in 1996. But Vriend v. Alberta, brought before the Supreme Court of Canada in 1997 and decided in 1998, with the unanimous decision that "the exclusion of homosexuals from Alberta's Individual Rights Protection Act is a violation of the Charter of Rights and Freedoms".

In 2018, The Edmonton Journal ran an article noting that since the 1990s equal rights case, The Kings University has become a place of acceptance for LGBTQ people. Kings held its first Pride event in 2018 and has an active student run LGBTQ organization called SPEAK. Professors and LGBTQ students commented that Kings is a safe place for LGBTQ individuals.

== Notable alumni ==
- Ronald A. Kuipers (1991) – Philosopher of religion at the Institute for Christian Studies in Toronto
- Ann Vriend (1997) – Winner of the Ottawa Bluesfest's 2013 'She's the One' contest for emerging artists

== Notable faculty ==
- Jacobus Kloppers (Professor Emeritus) – Internationally known classical organist.
