= Delwin Vriend =

Canadian gay rights litigant

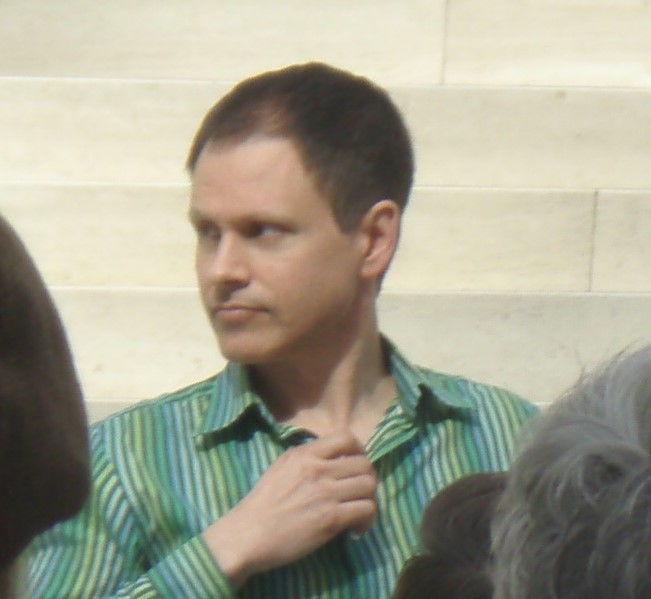
- Delwin Vriend ca. 2008, photo taken by Anthony Easton
- Born: January 22, 1966 (age 60); Sioux Center, Iowa, U.S.
- Parent(s): Dennis & Ruth Vriend

Delwin Vriend is a Canadian man who was at the center of a landmark provincial and federal legal case, Vriend v. Alberta, concerning the inclusion of sexual orientation as a protected human right in Canada.

== Early life ==
Delwin Vriend was born in Sioux Center, Iowa, in 1966, to a Canadian father and an American mother. At the age of two, Vriend moved to Edmonton, Alberta with his family. The oldest of five children, he was raised with three siblings on an organic vegetable farm south of Edmonton in Leduc County. His parents were members of the local Christian Reformed Church, and he attended private Christian elementary and secondary schools, before enrolling at The King's College (now The King's University) in Edmonton. He then transferred to Calvin College in Grand Rapids, Michigan, to earn his physics and mathematics degree. After briefly being employed as an electrician, Vriend was asked to work at The King's College as a laboratory coordinator and chemistry lab instructor. He worked in that capacity for three years.

== Human rights case ==
In 1991, Vriend, who was open within his congregation about being in a same-sex relationship, was fired because his sexual orientation was deemed incompatible with a newly created statement of religious belief adopted by The King's College.

Vriend attempted to file a discrimination complaint with the Alberta Human Rights Commission, but was refused on the grounds that sexual orientation was not protected under the province's human rights code. He subsequently sued the Government of Alberta and its Human Rights Commission.

In 1994, an Alberta court ruled that sexual orientation must be treated as a protected class under human rights legislation. The provincial government subsequently appealed and in 1996 the decision was overruled by the Alberta Court of Appeal. This decision was then appealed to the Supreme Court of Canada in the case of Vriend v. Alberta, who finally ruled in 1998 that provincial governments could not exclude protection of individuals from human rights legislation on the basis of sexual orientation.

Despite popular misunderstanding, the Vriend case was not against The King's College, and Vriend never pursued a human rights complaint against the institution. The case strictly involved whether claims to the Human Rights Commission on the basis of sexual orientation could be investigated by provincial human rights commissions, and did not set any legal precedent for the resolution of such claims. Canadian human rights legislation does exempt religious institutions in specific cases typically involving the education of minors, and the Supreme Court ruling did not change that. However, some religious groups had lobbied the provincial and federal governments to invoke Canada's notwithstanding clause to overrule the decision. This course of action was never pursued by the Alberta government.

The Supreme Court decision in Vriend v Alberta was used to argue provincial cases against bans on same-sex marriage throughout Canada. In addition, the decision has had greater ramifications within Canadian law outside of sexual orientation issues. It has shaped legal precedent concerning provincial and federal government relationships as well as labour and other human rights and constitutional laws.

== Personal life ==
Delwin Vriend left the Christian Reformed Church. After his termination, Vriend was unemployed for seven months before finding part-time employment with the AIDS Network of Edmonton Society and eventually a full-time position with the University of Alberta Library. However, the publicity surrounding the case caused Vriend to leave Canada in 2000.

In 2005, Delwin Vriend placed 44th on the list published by Alberta Venture magazine as one of this century's 50 greatest Albertans.

In 2011 Delwin Vriend was inducted into the Q Hall of Fame Canada.
