= Bernard Courte =

Bernard Courte (June 22, 1949 - October 19, 1991) was an AIDS activist, teacher, writer and advocate for Franco-Canadian rights.

== Early life ==
Courte was born and raised in Weir, Québec. Born into one of only two francophone families in town, Courte was fluent in both English and French. At the age of 17, he moved to Montréal to attend teacher's college. Around this time Courte came out through the city's bar scene. After being enrolled in teacher's college for a year, Courte decided to quit school. He later re-enrolled and earned his Bachelor and Master of Arts in Linguistics from the Université de Québec à Montréal and a degree in education from McGill University.

== Activism ==
Courte was present at the Truxx bar raid in 1977. The raid served as a galvanizing moment for him, and he joined the Association pour les Droits Gais du Québec and began contributing to their paper, Le Berdache, soon afterwards. Courte also translated pieces published by The Body Politic from English to French for Le Berdache readers. In 1982, Courte and other founding members established a new monthly called Sortie, a French-language gay publication. He served as Sortie's editor for 14 months.

Courte was an early AIDS activist, as he wrote pieces in Sortie and RG and appeared on television and radio to discuss the disease. He was involved with the Comité Sida Aide Montréal and served as a spokesperson for an AIDS walk-a-thon.

After moving to Toronto in 1986, Courte continued contributing to Sortie as their Toronto correspondent, and had his own column La Chronique Courte. Once Sortie folded, he began writing for Xtra!. His activism shifted following his move to Toronto, to include advocacy for the rights of Franco-Ontarians and their need for linguistically and culturally relevant services and resources. He began volunteering at the AIDS Committee of Toronto and AIDS Action Now!, preparing and translating resource material and flyers from english to french. Courte established AIDS Action Now!'s Équipe Francophone in 1988 and launched Traitement Sida, the French version of the AIDS Action Now!'s Treatment Update newsletter. He also volunteered for AIDS Action Now!'s Media Committee.

Courte established a francophone AIDS support group, organized safer sex workshops and was involved with nine AIDS conferences. He also worked on translation projects for various gay and lesbian groups in Toronto.

== Career ==
In 1976, Courte began teaching English as a second language at the Cégep Saint Jean sur Richelieu. In 1986, Courte relocated to Toronto after his partner Keith Russell was transferred to the city for work.

Courte got a job with the Ontario Institute for Studies in Education.

He frequently contributed to educational and francophone journals, including Orbit, OISE’s quarterly magazine, and L’Express de Toronto—Toronto's French-language weekly paper.

== Death ==
Courte died on October 19, 1991, from AIDS-related complications.
