= Shelley Lynn Tremain =

Philosopher of disability

Shelley Lynn Tremain is a philosopher whose work focuses on disability, feminism, bioethics, and Foucault. She has authored Foucault and Feminist Philosophy of Disability (2017), which won the 2016 Tobin Siebers Prize for Disability Studies in the Humanities, and edited Foucault and the Government of Disability (2005/2015).

Tremain earned her PhD from York University. In 2016, she won the Tanis Doe Award for Disability Study and Culture in Canada.

== Publications ==
=== As author ===
- Foucault and Feminist Philosophy of Disability. University of Michigan Press. 2017. ISBN 978-0-472-05373-5.

=== As editor ===
- Foucault and the Government of Disability. University of Michigan Press. 2005. ISBN 0-472-06876-8.
  - Foucault and the Government of Disability (2nd ed.). University of Michigan Press. 2015. ISBN 978-0-4720-3638-7.
- The Bloomsbury Guide to Philosophy of Disability. Bloomsbury. 2023. ISBN 978-1-350-26892-0.
