= Rick Bébout =

Canadian journalist and activist (1950–2009)

- Born: January 11, 1950; Ayer, Massachusetts, United States
- Died: June 10, 2009 (aged 59)
- Occupations: Editor; journalist
- Years active: 1972–2009
- Known for: LGBTQ rights activism
- Notable work: The Body Politic (editor, contributor)
- Honours: Q Hall of Fame
- Website: rbebout.com

Richard Bébout (January 11, 1950 – June 10, 2009) was a Canadian editor, journalist, and LGBTQ rights and AIDS activist. He is most noted for his contributions to LGBTQ rights organizations and publications in Toronto, especially his work on The Body Politic.

== Early life ==
Bébout was born on January 11, 1950 in Ayer, Massachusetts, United States. He was the second of nine children in his family. In 1969, when he was 19 years old, he left the United States for Canada to avoid being drafted into the Vietnam War. He ultimately settled in Toronto.

== Career ==
In 1972, Bébout edited The Open Gate: Toronto Union Station, a book of essays that has been credited with helping to prevent the demolition of Union Station. While working as a volunteer at the Canadian Gay Liberation Movement Archives (now known as the ArQuives), Bébout became acquainted with the editorial collective of the Toronto-based gay magazine The Body Politic, with whom the archives shared an office.

=== 1977–1986: The Body Politic and AIDS activism ===
Bébout joined The Body Politic's editorial collective in 1977 and began to contribute to the magazine as an editor, writer, publisher, and staff member. Fellow editor Gerald Hannon described Bébout in his memoirs as the collective's "most influential and powerful" member. As a politically radical gay publication, The Body Politic faced several legal challenges, and Bébout was one of ten Torontonians who faced obscenity charges after the magazine's offices were raided in December 1977. (The charges against all ten were eventually dropped.)

During the 1980s, Bébout helped organize and took part in several demonstrations against the Operation Soap bathhouse raids and other police raids of gathering places for gay men. He also wrote and published many articles in The Body Politic about HIV/AIDS prevention. Like the rest of the magazine's editorial collective, he was critical of the mainstream media's AIDS coverage. In one influential article, "Is There Safe Sex?", he summarized the available scientific knowledge about AIDS prevention and advocated for safe sex but acknowledged that mainstream medical advice about safe sex, such as using condoms and limiting sexual partners, did not always fit the realities of gay men's lives.

In a letter written to Jane Rule in December 1986, after the editorial collective decided to close the magazine, Bébout wrote that The Body Politic "will probably remain the most important thing any of us has ever done."

=== 1986–2009: Non-profit work and memoirs ===
From 1986 until 1993, Bébout worked for the AIDS Committee of Toronto (ACT) as a fundraiser and developer of educational content related to HIV/AIDS and safe sex. After he retired from ACT, he began writing his memoirs, which he self-published in 2003 as Promiscuous Affections: A Life in the Bar, 1969–2000.

He received the Ontario AIDS Network Honour Roll award in 1999 for his AIDS-prevention work. In 1998, he was inducted into the ArQuives' National Portrait Collection in recognition of his contributions to Canadian LGBTQ history and culture, and in 2011, he was posthumously inducted into the Q Hall of Fame.

== Personal life ==
Bébout was close friends with the prominent lesbian author Jane Rule, whom he first met through The Body Politic. They kept up a decades-long correspondence about their lives and various issues facing the LGBTQ community, including policing, censorship, pornography, and the HIV/AIDS crisis. Their letters were edited by Marilyn R. Schuster and published by UBC Press in 2017 as A Queer Love Story: The Letters of Jane Rule and Rick Bébout. Later in his life, Bébout was also a friend of Norwegian musician Sondre Lerche.

Bébout was diagnosed with HIV in 1988, several years into his work as an AIDS activist. He died of complications from a stroke on June 10, 2009.

== Works ==
- Bébout, Rick, ed. (1972). The Open Gate: Toronto Union Station. Toronto: Peter Martin Associates. ISBN 9780887780721.
- Bébout, Rick (2003). Promiscuous Affections: A Life in The Bar, 1969-2000. Self-published.
- Schuster, Marilyn R., ed. (May 1, 2017). A Queer Love Story: The Letters of Jane Rule and Rick Bébout. Vancouver: UBC Press. ISBN 9780774835435.
