= Anne Bishop (activist) =

Canadian activist and social justice advocate (born 1950)

- Born: 1950 (age 75–76)
- Occupations: educator, activist, author

Anne Bishop is a Canadian lesbian activist, educator, grassroots organizer and LGBT rights advocate.

== Biography ==
Anne Charlotte Bishop is an activist, author, educator, food security advocate, labour organizer, and community development worker.

Bishop has worked over thirty years in the field of international development and engaged in social justice movements. She also worked for the Nova Scotia Public Service in the area of diversity and employment equity as well as food security issues within Canada. She briefly attended the University of Toronto's Centre for Christian Studies in the 1970s with the intent to join the United Church of Canada as a Deaconess. Her studies introduced her to social analysis and collective approaches to education. Bishop was later one of the commissioners (along with Pat Kearns and Lucien Royer) who worked on the People's Food Commission, which was a participatory research project that held hearings across Canada in 1979 on issues of food security. In the 1980s she helped organize a union of workers (predominantly women) at a local fish plant in Pictou County where she worked. In the summer of 1987, she joined Henson College at Dalhousie University as the coordinator of the Community Development and Outreach Unit. As an adult educator, she helped develop a course on grassroots leadership development and wrote two influential books on consciousness-raising, anti-oppression organizational change and allyship. She has cited the Diggers movement of the sixteenth and seventeenth centuries in England as a source of influence. She was actively involved in social issues related to LGBT rights, union organizing, food system advocacy, equity and anti-racist efforts in the province of Nova Scotia since the mid-1980s. Bishop continues her work leading workshops on structural oppression.

== LGBT rights activism ==
Bishop advocated on behalf of the rights of lesbian and gay men in Halifax, Nova Scotia, leading to the securing of spousal rights for CUSO (Canadian University Service Overseas) and Dalhousie University employees. From 1987 to 1992 she played a central role in Lesbian and Gay Rights Nova Scotia, which lobbied the provincial government for inclusion of sexual orientation in the Nova Scotia Human Rights Act. In a landmark decision, it was the first provincial jurisdiction in Canada to do so in 1992.

== Personal life ==
In the 1980s, Bishop, along with Brenda Beagan, founded a women's chorus, The Secret Furies. Bishop had previously been part of a quartet called Lysistrata. Bishop is currently an organic farmer in rural Nova Scotia with her partner Jan. In 1998, her portrait was painted for The ArQuives.

== Select publications ==
- Bishop, Anne (2019). Under the bridge. Fernwood. ISBN 978-1-77363-043-4. (a novel)
- Bishop, Anne (2015). Becoming an ally breaking the cycle of oppression in people (3rd ed.). Fernwood. ISBN 978-1-55266-723-1.
- Bishop, Anne; Fay, Jeanne; Henson College of Public Affairs and Continuing Education (2008). Grassroots leaders building skills a course in community leadership. Point Black, N.-É.: Fernwood Pub.
- Bishop, Anne (2005). Beyond token change: breaking the cycle of oppression in institutions. Halifax, N.S.: Fernwood. ISBN 978-1-55266-163-5.
- Bishop, Anne. "On the March: Maritime Gays and Lesbians Get Organized." New Maritimes, 8:3 (January–February 1990): 1–17.
- People's Food Commission (1980). The Land of milk and money: the national report of the People's Food Commission. Kitchener, Ont.: Between the Lines. ISBN 978-0-919946-15-6.

== Awards and recognition ==
- Bishop's portrait by Mary S. Lyons was one of the 25 inaugural portraits that established the National Portrait Gallery of the Canadian Lesbian and Gay Archives.
