= Central Toronto Youth Services =

Mental health centre in Toronto, Canada

Central Toronto Youth Services (CTYS) is an accredited children's mental health centre serving youth throughout the Toronto Region. CTYS serves at-risk youth aged 12 to 24, focusing on meeting the needs of the hardest to serve young people. Funding comes from the Province of Ontario, the Ministry of Children and Youth Services, and the Ministry of Health and Long Term Care, as such, all CTYS services are free of charge.

CTYS operates one office downtown Toronto, located at 65 Wellesley Street East, Suite 300.

== History ==
In 1973 CTYS was incorporated and licensed as a Children's Mental Health Centre.

In 1987 the Sexual Orientation and Youth Program (SOYP) of CTYS gained core-funding from MCSS, a unique status as the only core-funded program for lesbian, gay and bisexual youth in Canada. It later joined with the AIDS Committee of Toronto and Positive Youth Outreach to form the first campaign in Canada specifically targeting youth with AIDS or HIV.

In 2007 CTYS was honoured at the City of Toronto Access, Equity and Human Rights Awards ceremony as recipients of the Pride Award for their work with gay, lesbian, bisexual and transgender Youth.

== Leadership ==
=== Board of directors ===
Central Toronto Youth Services is led by a nine-member volunteer Board. Margaret Leitenberger, the retired Director of the Children's Aid Society of Toronto's Toronto Branch, is the Chair of the Board. Other Board Directors include Dr. Ned McKeown, James LeNoury, Peter Chaban, Mary Murphy, Magda Zecevic, David Fung, Josh Bohnen, and Brian O'Connor.

=== Director Team ===
Heather Sproule, MSW, is the executive director of CTYS. She joined Central Toronto Youth Services in April 2007. Over the past 17 years she has served as the Founding Executive Director of Kids Help Phone, the National Executive Director of Boys & Girls Clubs of Canada and the first President of Big Brothers and Big Sisters of Toronto. She leads a Director team which includes Dr. Fred Mathews, Director of Programs and Research, and Joan Marshall, BA, CGA, Director of Administration and Human Resources.

== Publications ==
- Options: Control Problems and Alternatives to Section 8, 1975
- Priorities: The Effects of Funding Structures on Services to Adolescents In Ontario - A Proposal for Re-allocation of Resources, December 1976
- Youth, Opportunity, Action, 1982
- Mirror to the Night: A Psycho-Social Study of Adolescent Prostitution, 1986
- Often Invisible: Counselling Gay and Lesbian Youth, 1988
- Pride and Prejudice: The life and times of gay and lesbian youth, 1992
  - Updated as Pride and Prejudice: Working with Lesbian, Gay and Bisexual Youth, 1997
- No Safe Bed: lesbian and gay youth in residential services, 1993
- Opening Doors: Counseling lesbian and gay youth, 1994
