= Little Sister's Book and Art Emporium =

Book store in Vancouver, Canada

Coordinates: 49.282336°N 123.134251°W

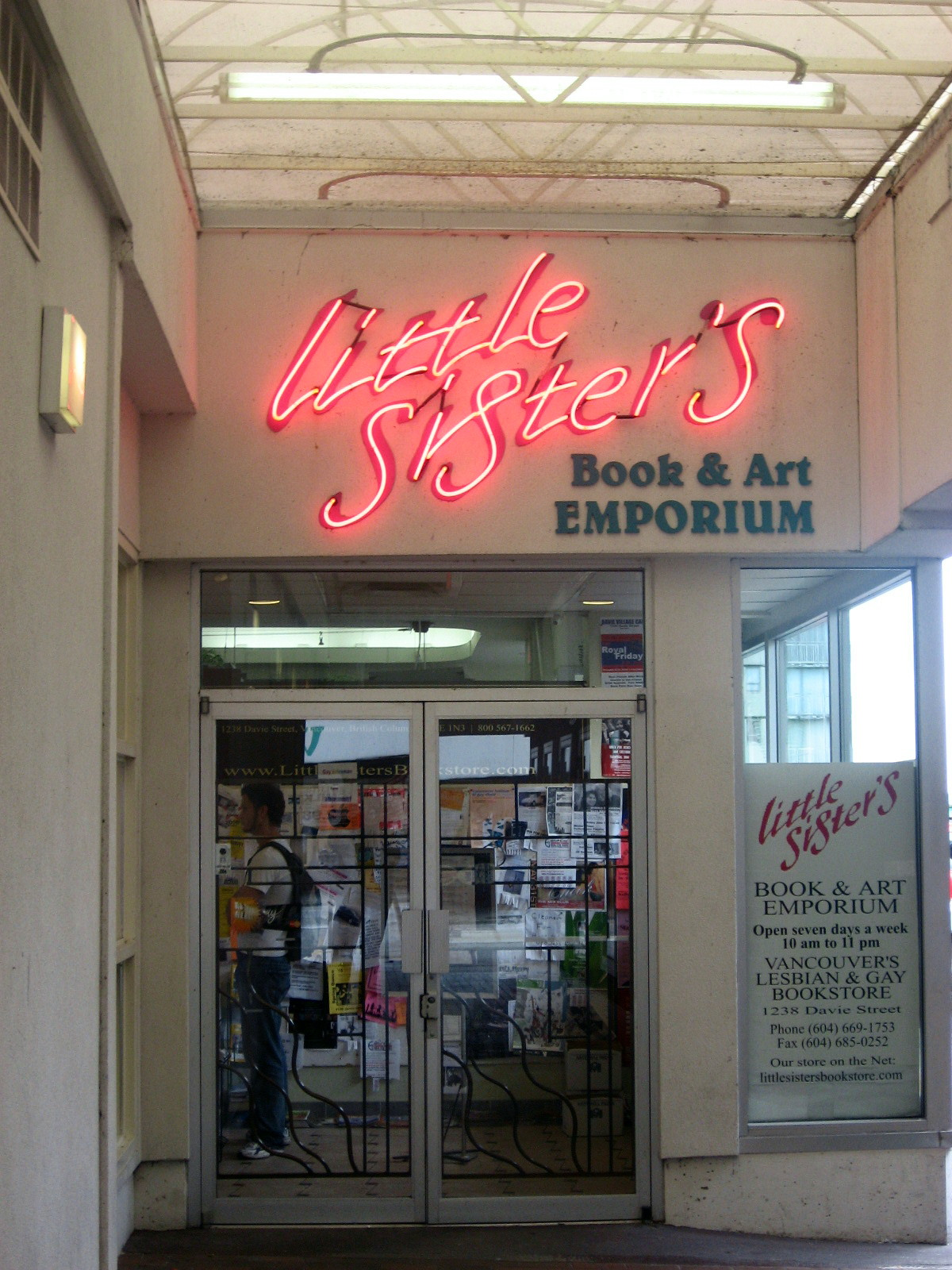
- The shop's main entrance
- Type: Private
- Industry: Books, Apparel, Adult Lifestyle Prodcuts
- Founded: Vancouver, British Columbia (1983)
- Headquarters: 1238 Davie Street; Vancouver, British Columbia; V6E 1N3
- Key people: Jim Deva, Bruce Smyth, & Barbara Thomas (founders); Janine Fuller (former manager); Don Wilson (former owner); Parmjot Gill (owner, since 2026)
- Website: littlesisters.ca

Little Sister's Book and Art Emporium, also known as Little Sister's Bookstore, but usually called "Little Sister's", is an independent bookstore in the Davie Village/West End neighbourhood of Vancouver, British Columbia, Canada. The bookstore was opened in 1983 by Jim Deva, Bruce Smyth, and Barbara Thomas. It is currently owned by Parmjot (Parm) Gill, a Vancouver-based investor, entrepreneur and chair of Queer Business BC, who acquired the store in 2026. The store originally opened above a residential house on Thurlow Street, just off Davie Street, before relocating to its current 1238 Davie Street premises in June 1996. In addition to books, the store carries LGBTQ- and Pride-themed merchandise, as well as a large and varied selection of gender confirmation and adult toys and related products. While it has a long history as an 2SLGBTQIA+ business, catering to that community specifically, it carries product for the general public as well.

Since taking ownership, Gill has said he intends to preserve the store's community role while modernizing its operations, including updates to its e-commerce platform and a retail refresh. Gill has described the store as a "sanctuary" for the 2SLGBTQ+ community that he intends to keep "friendly and approachable" as it grows.

Deva died on September 21, 2014 and Smyth died on December 23, 2019.

In 2019, the BC and Yukon Book Prizes announced the Jim Deva Prize for Writing that Provokes, an award for challenging and innovative literature by British Columbia writers named in Deva's memory and funded by a donation from Smyth shortly before his death.

During Pride Month in 2026, Canada Post featured the bookstore in "Places of Pride", a set of four postage stamps commemorating historic 2SLGBTQ+ sites. The stamp portraits depict founders Jim Deva and Bruce Smyth and longtime manager Janine Fuller, alongside an illustration of the store's namesake cat, Little Sister.

== Legal cases ==
During the 1980s, the store was the target of three separate bomb attacks; the first exploded in the stairwell in December 1987, and a second detonated two months later in a restaurant located beneath the store. No one was seriously injured in either attack.

The bookstore was famously the plaintiff in Little Sisters Book and Art Emporium v Canada, where it challenged Canada Customs' repeated decisions to block its shipments of erotic literature under customs regulations that bar "obscene materials" as a violation of free expression and equality rights. These materials, nearly all dealing with male–male or female–female sexuality, were routinely seized at the border. One example of the type of content being censored and detained was the work of the Canadian art collective Kiss & Tell. As a group of Vancouver-based lesbian artists, Kiss & Tell explored queer sexuality through their photography. Images from their series Drawing the Line, while on route to Little Sister's by way of Deneuve magazine, were seized at the Canadian border for representing bondage, and were deemed "immoral". These same publications with either the same or similarly explicit content, when destined for mainstream booksellers in the country, were often been delivered without delay or question. Glad Day Bookshop, an LGBT bookstore in Toronto, faced similar difficulties.

... [A]lternative culture and lifestyles, including manuals and handbooks on safe sex (?!) were proclaimed indecent by someone who has no right to judge them in his/her bias/bigotry, which violates the anti-discrimination protection of the Charter of Rights and Freedoms guaranteeing equality of all Canadians. Not to mention that five out of ten provinces (plus one of the two territories) explicitly forbid discrimination based on sexual orientation.

— Miodrag Kojadinović: "Trials and Tribulations", Angles magazine, Vancouver, October 1993

Little Sister's filed their claim against the federal government in 1990 but the case stalled and was not heard by the Supreme Court of British Columbia until October 1994. The court ruled in January 1996 that Little Sister's shipments had been wrongly delayed or withheld due to the "systemic targeting of Little Sisters' importations in the Customs Mail Center" but did not strike down the legislation. The court ruled that banning importation of obscene material, while a violation of section 2 of the Charter, constituted a reasonable limit under section 1 and that there was no violation of the equality rights under section 15. Little Sister's appealed the latter portion of the decision to the British Columbia Court of Appeal, which agreed with the lower court.

Little Sister's appealed to the Supreme Court of Canada in 2000. The court agreed with the lower courts that customs authorities had unfairly targeted shipments to the bookstore and that the laws on obscene material were contrary to section 2 of the Charter but saved under section 1. However, the court also ruled that the provisions of the Customs Act which placed the onus on the importer to disprove obscenity were unconstitutional. The case established that there is a Charter right to import expressive material unless the government proves it is obscene or otherwise illegal.

The bookstore's travails were fictionalized as a subplot of the film Better Than Chocolate. A feature-length documentary film by Aerlyn Weissman, Little Sister's vs. Big Brother (2002), has also been released about the bookstore. Former manager Janine Fuller was also a coauthor with Stuart Blackley of the book Restricted Entry: Censorship on Trial, a non-fiction account of the Little Sister's battle, and wrote an introduction for Forbidden Passages: Writings Banned in Canada, an anthology of excerpts from some of the impounded works which was edited by Patrick Califia. Both books were published in 1995, and were awarded Lammys at the 8th Lambda Literary Awards ceremony in 1996. Additionally, the book What right?: Graphic interpretations against censorship addressed the court case in the form of a graphic novel, with proceeds from sales of the book being donated to the Little Sister's Defense fund to assist with legal challenges with Canada Customs. The book features contributions from a number of comic artists including Alison Bechdel and Marc Bell.

== See also ==
- Little Sisters Book and Art Emporium v. Canada (Minister of Justice), [2000] 2 S.C.R. 1120
- Spartacus Books, another bookstore in Vancouver with a wide "queer lit" section
- Feminist bookstore
- Gay's the Word (bookshop)
