= Socialist Challenge (Canada) =

Defunct Trotskyist organization in Canada

- Predecessor: Alliance for Socialist Action; former members of the Revolutionary Workers League
- Successor: merged into New Socialist Group
- Formation: 1988
- Dissolved: 1999
- Type: Political organization
- Purpose: Trotskyism; revolutionary socialism
- Region served: English-speaking Canada
- Publication: Socialist Challenge
- Affiliations: Gauche Socialiste; Fourth International

Socialist Challenge was a Trotskyist organization in English-speaking Canada. It emerged in the 1980s from former members and dissidents of the Revolutionary Workers League/Ligue Ouvrière Révolutionnaire (RWL/LOR), and later operated in association with the Quebec organization Gauche Socialiste as Socialist Challenge/Gauche Socialiste.

== Background ==
The RWL/LOR was formed in 1977 through the fusion of the League for Socialist Action/Ligue Socialiste Ouvrière, the Revolutionary Marxist Group, the Groupe Marxiste Révolutionnaire and the Young Socialists/Ligue des Jeunes Socialistes. Robert J. Alexander described the RWL as the Canadian section of the reunified Fourth International.

John Riddell, a former member of the RWL/LOR, wrote that in 1982–83 the Socialist Workers Party in the United States dropped the designation "Trotskyist" and expelled dissidents who opposed the change. According to Riddell, this had "a strong echo in Canada": most RWL/LOR members accepted the SWP's shift, while dissident currents left or were pushed aside. He wrote that one dissident group in Quebec formed Gauche Socialiste in 1983, while an English-Canadian group launched the Alliance for Socialist Action, later called Socialist Challenge.

Riddell also argued that the RWL/LOR increasingly followed the orientation of the U.S. SWP, abandoned several earlier political orientations, and in 1990 dropped the RWL/LOR name in favour of the Communist League, the name used by the SWP's international sister organizations.

== Formation and politics ==
The English-Canadian organization was initially known as the Alliance for Socialist Action. A 1988 bulletin published by the Bolshevik Tendency described Socialist Challenge as having been known until May 1988 as the Alliance for Socialist Action.

Socialist Challenge operated in association with Gauche Socialiste in Quebec. A 1996 obituary for Quebec socialist Michel Mill in Against the Current stated that Gauche Socialiste merged with Socialist Challenge in the mid-1980s to form the Fourth International's section in the Canadian state. The official Fourth International website currently lists Gauche Socialiste and the New Socialist Group under Canada, but not Socialist Challenge, which had ceased to exist as a separate organization.

Socialist Challenge published a newspaper also called Socialist Challenge. Its politics were rooted in the Fourth International tradition and in opposition to the direction taken by the RWL/LOR and the U.S. Socialist Workers Party in the 1980s.

== Split and dissolution ==
In 1994, Socialist Challenge split when Barry Weisleder and a small group of supporters left or were expelled. Weisleder later wrote that Socialist Challenge/Gauche Socialiste had moved away from democratic-centralist party-building and that he and Elizabeth Byce were expelled in 1993. The following year, Weisleder and supporters founded Socialist Action Canada. Because Weisleder's account is self-published and reflects the position of the faction that left Socialist Challenge, the details of the split should be treated as attributed claims.

Socialist Challenge subsequently became involved in the formation of the New Socialist Group and ultimately merged into the New Socialists in 1999. A 2019 statement by former New Socialist Group members said the NSG officially dissolved in 2017, although former members continued to be active in local groups with similar politics.
