= Maurice Spector =

Canadian politician, editor and Trotskyist activist

Maurice Spector (March 19, 1898 – August 1, 1968) was a Canadian politician who served as the chairman of the Communist Party of Canada and the editor of its newspaper, The Worker, for much of the 1920s. He was an early follower of Leon Trotsky after Trotsky's split from the Communist International.

== Early life ==
Spector was born in the Russian Empire and immigrated to Canada with his family as an infant. He graduated from Queen's University and practiced labour law in Toronto when he was not employed in political positions.

== First radical political activity ==
Spector's earliest political engagement was with the Social Democratic Party (SDP) in Canada in 1914. By 1916 he was publishing in the SDP's paper Canadian Forward and in 1918 was editor of the University of Toronto's paper The Varsity. In 1918, Spector was involved in a controversy where an edition of the Varsity that he published was censored by the Canadian government for criticizing its involvement in World War I. Spector's move to Communism was influenced by the first writing of the Bolsheviks to be published in Canada, Trotsky's work The Bolsheviki and World Peace, which was published in the Toronto Mail and Empire in January 1918 by Social Democratic Party of Canada Dominion Secretary Isaac Bainbridge. Spector engaged with the left wing of the Canadian SDP up to 1920, then formed the Toronto branch of the United Communist Party of America, and eventually formed the Communist Party of Canada in 1921, where he was editor of their illegal paper The Communist and their legal paper The Worker.

== Turn to Trotskyism ==
In 1928, Spector, while attending the Sixth Congress of the Comintern in Moscow, accidentally got hold of a copy of Trotsky's Critique of the Draft Programme of the Communist International, which criticized the position of Nikolai Bukharin and Joseph Stalin and especially the theory of "socialism in one country". The critique was a landmark in the ideological arming of the International Left Opposition. In a truly-prophetic statement, Trotsky warned that if this position were adopted by the Communist International, it would inevitably mark the beginning of a process that would lead to the nationalist and reformist degeneration of every communist party in the world. Three generations later, his prediction, which was then ridiculed by the Stalinists, has been shown to be correct.

Stalin had no intention of circulating Trotsky's document, but by a strange accident of history, that is what happened. The Stalinist regime had not yet been consolidated, and the Communist International still had to observe certain norms of democratic centralism, which permitted the circulation of minority opinions. Although Trotsky had been expelled from the Russian party a year earlier, he took advantage of the Congress to appeal to the Communist International. In the process, he submitted his document on the Draft Programme. Through a blunder in the apparatus, it circulated Trotsky's document to the heads of the delegations, including members of the programme commission. It was then that the American James Cannon and Maurice Spector first saw and read Trotsky's document.

Cannon recalled:

"Through some slip-up in the apparatus in Moscow," recalls Cannon, "which was supposed to be airtight, this document of Trotsky came into the translating room of the Comintern. It fell into the hopper, where they had a dozen or more translators and stenographers with nothing else to do. They picked up Trotsky's document, translated it and distributed it to the heads of the delegations and the members of the programme commission. So, lo and behold, it was laid in my lap, translated into English by Maurice Spector, a delegate from the Canadian party, and in somewhat the same frame of mind as myself, was also on the programme commission and he got a copy. We let the caucus meetings and the Congress sessions go to the devil while we read and studied this document. Then I knew what I had to do, and so did he. Our doubts had been resolved. It was as clear as daylight that Marxist truth was on the side of Trotsky. We had a compact there and then - Spector and I - that we would come back home and begin a struggle under the banner of Trotskyism."

Spector was a founder of the Canadian Trotskyist movement, which was first constituted as a branch of the Communist League of America in 1929.

== Workers Party of Canada ==
In 1932 he co-founded, with Jack MacDonald, the Workers Party of Canada. The new organization represented the first Canadian section of the International Left Opposition.

== Leaving Canada ==
Spector moved to New York City in 1936 and became a leading member of the Trotskyist movement there. He presented the International Report at the founding convention of the Socialist Workers Party at the end of 1938 but dropped out of the party in 1939. (Contrary to some reports, he did not take part in the 1939-40 debate between James Cannon and Max Shachtman.)

He joined the Socialist Party of America shortly after leaving the SWP in 1939 and remained on its executive body until 1958, when he resigned after breaking with Max Shachtman and his proposal to merge Shachtman's Independent Socialist League with the Socialist Party, which Spector anticipated would move the SP to the right.

In his later, Spector became editor of a children's magazine published by the Labour Zionist movement.

== Deportation threat ==
Canada had revoked Spector's citizenship, and in 1941, the Federal Bureau of Investigation learned that Spector was in the United States illegally and had him detained. As Canada refused to accept him, the United States began proceedings to deport him to the Soviet Union. The American Civil Liberties Union defended Spector on the grounds that as a Trotskyist, his life would be in danger if he was deported to the Soviet Union. Spector eventually regained his Canadian citizenship and was permitted to remain in New York.

== Later life ==
Spector was employed for part of his post-Trotskyist career by the American Council for Judaism and was director of the New York trade union division of the National Committee for Labor Israel in his later years.

Spector died on August 1, 1968, at the age of 70.
