= Left Caucus =

20th-century pressure group in the Canadian New Democratic Party

The Left Caucus was an Ontario-based left-wing pressure group within the New Democratic Party of Canada and the Ontario New Democratic Party from the late 1970s to early 1990s.

The Caucus was formed several years after the demise of The Waffle, an earlier left-wing faction which had been forced to leave the NDP in the mid-1970s.

It was formed by 150 to 200 members in the lead up to the NDP's 1979 federal convention to which it proposed a series of radical resolutions promoting greater public ownership of the economy and other socialist and left-wing measures. John Rodriguez, Member of Parliament for Nickel Belt, was the leading spokesperson for the caucus. Another notable founding member of the Left Caucus was Ontario NDP MPP and future provincial finance minister Floyd Laughren.

Rodriguez said the caucus differed from the Waffle in that its ultra-left elements were a minor part and as it was willing to abide by the final resolutions of the convention, whether it agrees with them or not. However, Rodriguez warned that the Left Caucus would be outspoken if resolutions it favours passed the convention but were ignored by the party's leadership.

The only one of the caucus' resolutions to be approved by the 1979 convention, however, was one protesting the jail sentence handed to Jean-Claude Parrot, president of the Canadian Union of Postal Workers for leading a wildcat strike.

In 1981, the Left Caucus opposed Bob Rae's successful candidacy for the leadership of the Ontario NDP backing MPP Richard Johnston instead.

Prior to the 1983 federal convention, the Left Caucus again pushed for the party to adopt an economic policy focussed on nationalization of industry and issued a document decrying "the half-measures of a mixed economy" and calling for "a socialist industrial strategy based on public sector ownership of the decisive sectors of the economy." The caucus unsuccessfully opposed the adoption of a new "statement of principles" by the NDP in 1983 which watered down the party's commitment to socialism and the planned economy.

In the mid-1980s the Caucus was involved with the Campaign for an Activist Party which attempted unsuccessfully to elect a slate led by Judy Rebick to the executive of the Ontario NDP.

Simon Rosenblum, later a vice-president of the ONDP and chief of staff to provincial finance minister Floyd Laughren, was a leader of the caucus in the early 1980s and authored a resolution that called on an NDP government to use "the central role of public ownership in the development of our primary resource industries". By the end of the 1980s the Left Caucus was led by members of the "Forward" Group such as Gord Doctorow, Wayne Roberts, Harry Kopyto and George Ehring.

The Caucus declined from 1990 to 1995 while the Ontario NDP was in government under Bob Rae with publication of the Left Caucus Newsletter ceasing in 1994. In 1993, leading Left Caucus members Harry Kopyto, Gord Doctorow and Lois Bedard organised an open letter signed by 11 party members including three dissident MPPs criticising the Rae government for being too close to corporate interests and alienating itself from labour.
