= Honey Badger (disambiguation) =

The honey badger is a small mammal in the Mustelidae family.

Honey Badger or honey badger may also refer to:

== Arts and entertainment ==
- Honey Badger (Glee) or Terri Schuester, a character on Glee
- Honey Badger or Gabby Kinney, a character related to X-23 in Marvel Comics
- The Honey Badger, a 1965 novel by Robert Ruark
- The Honey Badger, a 2016 documentary short film about Daniel Hayes
- "Honey Badger", an episode of the television show Survivor: Caramoan

== People with the nickname ==
- Nick Cummins (born 1987), Australian rugby union player
- Brad Marchand (born 1988), Canadian ice hockey player
- Tyrann Mathieu (born 1992), American football player
- Daniel Ricciardo (born 1989), Australian Formula One driver

== Other uses ==
- Honey badger (men's rights), a female men's rights activist
- AAC Honey Badger, a rifle based on the AR-15
- Hamilton Honey Badgers, a Canadian professional basketball team
- Laredo Honey Badgers, an American professional indoor soccer team
- Operation Honey Badger, an operation of the US intelligence to spy China uncovered in 2010
- Project Honey Badger within Operation Credible Sport, a project by the US military

== See also ==
- The Crazy Nastyass Honey Badger, a YouTube viral video and Internet meme
