= Gary Kinsman =

Canadian sociologist

- Born: Gary William Kinsman; 1955 (age 70–71); Toronto, Ontario, Canada

Academic background
- Influences: Antonio Gramsci; Sheila Rowbotham

Academic work
- Discipline: Sociology
- School or tradition: Queer liberation
- Institutions: Laurentian University
- Main interests: LGBTQ issues

Gary William Kinsman (born 1955) is a Canadian sociologist. Born in Toronto, he studies lesbian, gay, bisexual, and transgender issues. In 1987, he wrote a text on LGBTQ social history, Regulation of Desire, reprinted in 1995. In 2000, he edited and co-authored a second work, on Canadian federal government surveillance of marginal and dissident political and social groups, Whose National Security? In 2010, Kinsman's newest book, The Canadian War on Queers: National Security as Sexual Regulation, co-written with Patrizia Gentile, was published by University of British Columbia Press and released on 1 March.

Gary Kinsman was involved in the Young Socialists during high school in the early 1970s, where he first came in contact with the gay liberation movement. Kinsman later joined the Revolutionary Marxist Group, which eventually fused with the League for Socialist Action, creating the Revolutionary Workers League. Before the onset of Kinsman’s AIDS related activism, he was involved in the Gay Liberation Union, Gay Liberation Against the Right Everywhere, the Right to Privacy Committee, and later the Canadian Committee Against Customs Censorship.

A retired professor of sociology, formerly at Laurentian University in Sudbury, Ontario, Kinsman's research and publication focuses primarily on the sociological perspectives of LGBT issues. Kinsman is also a social activist on feminist, trade union, social justice, and anti-poverty issues.

Kinsman was a writer for The Body Politic and a central figure in the publication of the successor magazine Rites. He helped found Gays and Lesbians Against the Right Everywhere and the Lesbian and Gay Pride Day Committee of Toronto.

In Sudbury, he was one of the organizers of the city's first-ever Sudbury Pride event in 1997.

In 2015, Kinsman was active in a campaign lobbying for a formal apology from the Government of Canada for the purges of LGBT people from the federal civil service in the 1950s and 1960s.

In 2024, he publicly resigned from Pride Toronto membership, citing the organization's failure to acknowledge or take action on the Queers in Palestine call to stop the "probable genocide in Gaza".

== Works ==
Interview about The Canadian War on Queers
Kinsman discusses his 2010 book in an interview with Queer Review on CHRW-FM in 2011

- The Regulation of Desire: Homo and Hetero Sexualities : Montreal, New York: Black Rose: (1987, 1995): ISBN 0-920057-81-0, ISBN 1-55164-040-6
- Whose National Security? Canadian State Surveillance and the Creation of Enemies Toronto: Between the Lines (2000): ISBN 1-896357-25-3
- The Canadian War on Queers: National Security as Sexual Regulation Vancouver: UBC Press:(2010): ISBN 978-0-7748-1628-1
