= Socialist education =

Socialist education may refer to:

- Socialist Education Movement, a 1963–1965 movement launched by Mao Zedong in the People's Republic of China
- A system of education in Mexico in the 1930s
- The Socialist Education League, a Trotskyist organization in Canada
