= Rites (magazine) =

Canadian LGBT magazine

- Founder: Peter Birt; Romaine Brooks; Lyn Freese; Gary Kinsman; Anne Nixon; Heather Ramsay; Doug Wilson
- First issue: 1984
- Final issue: 1992
- Company: Rites Publishing
- Country: Canada
- Based in: Toronto, Ontario
- Language: English

Rites was a Canadian magazine, published for gay, lesbian, bisexual, and transgender communities in Canada from 1984 to 1992.

== Founding ==
The magazine was published in Toronto, Ontario, by Rites Publishing and was produced by a non-profit collective. Founding members of the Rites collective were Peter Birt, Romaine Brooks, Lyn Freese, Gary Kinsman, Anne Nixon, Heather Ramsay, and Doug Wilson. Many of the founding members had previously been associated with Pink Ink, a monthly national publication for lesbians and gay men of which five issues were published between July 1983 and January 1984.

== Membership ==
Over its almost eight years of operation, additional Rites collective members included (in the order in which they joined): Mary Louise Adams, Stuart Blackley, Susan Wilkes, Scott Ferguson, Celest Natale, Doug Stewart, Ruthann Tucker, Robert Champagne, Becki Ross, Michael Nicholson, Shawn Syms, Mark Michaud, Anne Vespry, Rebecca Frank, Regan McClure, Lynn Iding and Rachel Aitcheson.

== Issues ==
A total of 76 issues of Rites were published – from Vol. 1 No. 1 (May 1984) to Vol. 8 No. 6 (January/February 1992). Rites was published 10 times a year, until Vol. 8 No. 4 (September/October 1991) when the frequency of publication changed to six times a year.

Two thousand copies of each issue were printed and distributed through paid subscriptions and distribution to retail outlets across Canada and the United States. The readership of Rites was 60 per cent lesbian and lesbian/gay-positive women, and 40 per cent gay and lesbian/gay-positive men.

== Subjects ==
An expressly political magazine, Rites was published to further lesbian and gay liberation, feminism, and progressive social change. The Rites collective saw the magazine as part of building an active lesbian and gay liberation movement. Rites was committed to cross-Canada coverage and the equal involvement of lesbians and gay men in all aspects of the magazine's production.

Rites explored the interconnections between the lesbian and gay liberation movement, the women's movement, anti-racist struggles, peace activism, the trade union movement, struggles related to class, age and disability, and other liberation struggles, including the fight to end apartheid in South Africa. Rites was also committed to developing a political response to the AIDS crisis, supporting persons living with AIDS (PLWAs), and eroticizing safe sex.

Rites rejected the sexual libertarian politics commonly asserted by other lesbian and gay publications that it saw as failing to challenge sexist and racist forms of social power underlying the experiences of women, lesbians, and gays of colour.

== Rites' news group ==
Rites' news group – an extensive network of volunteer news correspondents across Canada – produced news articles and shorter news briefs covering, amongst other issues: the rights of sex workers, feminist struggles related to pornography, anti-censorship struggles (including the legal case brought by Toronto's Glad Day Bookshop and the Canadian Committee against Customs Censorship challenging Canada Customs' censorship of The Joy of Gay Sex), police harassment of lesbians and gays, International Women's Day, abortion rights, Take Back the Night marches, lesbian and gay pride marches across Canada, lesbian motherhood, anti-apartheid struggles (including those of Simon Nkoli, then South Africa's leading black gay activist), and the formation and operation of AIDS Action Now! in Toronto. Rites also covered the struggle for legal protection against discrimination in provincial and federal law, including the anti-discrimination case of fired racing steward John Damien in Ontario and the campaign that led to inclusion of sexual orientation in the Ontario Human Rights Code.

Rites also contributed extensively to Canadian news coverage of the AIDS crisis, including reporting on activism at the 1989 Montreal International AIDS Conference and publishing "Talking Politics: Diary of an AIDS Activist", a regular column by George Smith, who was also a founder of Toronto's Right to Privacy Committee. Rites was a vital early source of information on AIDS treatment, publishing Sean Hosein's regular column "AIDS Treatment Update" from September 1987 onwards.

== Other areas of interest ==
In addition to news coverage, Rites was a forum to examine the rites and rituals of lesbian and gay culture and published new works of lesbian and gay fiction, poetry, photography and visual arts. Writers published in Rites included: Michael Riordan, Ian Young, Mariana Valverde, Sara Diamond, Makeda Silvera, Robin Metcalfe, Sky Gilbert, Michael Achtman, Thomas Waugh, Marusya Bociurkiw, Anne Cameron, Steven Maynard, Audrey Butler, Doug Stewart, and François Lachance. Amongst others, Rites also published the poetry of Brenda Brooks and Ian Iqbal Rashid, the photography of Cyndra MacDowall, the visual art of Persimmon Blackbridge and Sheila Gilhooly, the graphic illustrations of Alanna Marohnic, and The Chosen Family cartoons of Noreen Stevens.

Rites also published extensive cultural reviews of plays, movies and books, including Peter McGehee's "In My Opinion", a regular cultural review column. A number of occasional columns, "Lesbiantics", "Fairy Tales", and "No Regrets", explored personal experiences and opinions. Scott McArthur and David Adler wrote a ground-breaking column on disability issues in the lesbian and gay community.

== Social status ==
Rites was an important forum for the publication of Canadian lesbian and gay history, publishing the first interview with Jim Egan, Canada's first public gay activist in the 1950s (who initiated a lawsuit – Egan v Canada – that ultimately led, in 1995, to a landmark Supreme Court of Canada decision interpreting the Canadian Charter of Rights and Freedoms to prohibit discrimination by the state based on sexual orientation). The magazine also carried articles on the history of lesbian and gay communities in Toronto and Montreal, and published a special supplement of lesbian and gay history book reviews.

Other special supplements published in Rites over its history included features on families, youth, lesbians and gays of colour, lesbian and gay survivors of childhood sexual abuse, AIDS prevention, racism, science fiction, aging, and relationships.

In Vol. 7 No. 8 (January/February 1991) Rites published "Queer Entries", a comprehensive index to its first six volumes (from May 1984 to April 1990). Rites was also indexed in the Alternative Press Index.

== Disbandment ==
Rites Publishing ceased operation in April 1992, citing a shrinking volunteer workforce and growing debts caused by escalating costs and declining revenues.

Collections of Rites can be found in a number of public libraries in Canada, as well as at the Canadian Lesbian and Gay Archives in Toronto.

== See also ==
- List of lesbian periodicals
