= Socialist League (Canada) =

Defunct Canadian Trotskyist organization

- Predecessor: Labour Party Tendency; former members of the League for Socialist Action
- Formation: 1974
- Dissolved: 1990s
- Type: Political organization
- Purpose: Trotskyism; socialism within the New Democratic Party
- Region served: Canada
- Publication: Forward

The Socialist League, commonly known as the Forward Group, was a Canadian Trotskyist organization formed in 1974 by supporters of Ross Dowson after a split in the League for Socialist Action (LSA). The group published the newspaper Forward and was active in the New Democratic Party (NDP), particularly through left-wing caucus work in Ontario.

== Origins ==
The Socialist League developed out of disputes in the LSA over the NDP, entryism, and Canadian nationalism. Patrick Webber writes that, after disputes over the LSA's work in the New Brunswick NDP and Waffle movement, opponents of Dowson's approach formed the Revolutionary Communist Tendency in 1973 and criticized the LSA's NDP policy as opportunist. According to Webber, Dowson's policies were defeated at the LSA's 1973 convention, after which Dowson and his supporters reconstituted themselves as the Labour Party Tendency and renamed the group Forward the following year.

Daniel Sobel's 2021 obituary of Wayne Roberts in Labour/Le Travail states that Roberts was part of a group aligned with Dowson that parted ways with the LSA in 1974 and formed the Socialist League, also known as the Forward Group after its newspaper. The McMaster University Library finding aid for the League for Socialist Action collection also identifies the Socialist League as a former LSA group and lists Socialist League circulars, pamphlets and meeting notices from 1974.

== Political orientation ==
The Socialist League supported continued socialist work inside the NDP. Webber describes Dowson as a supporter of entryism in the NDP who feared that confrontational activity by Trotskyists could provoke expulsions and damage the LSA's work inside the party. Former Socialist League members Harry Kopyto, Gord Doctorow and John Darling later described the Forward Group's approach as "long-term non-split fraction work in the NDP".

The group also differed from other Canadian Trotskyist currents over Canadian nationalism and the influence of the Waffle. Kopyto, Doctorow and Darling wrote that one of the major disputes between the Labour Party Tendency and the LSA concerned the LSA's criticism of the nationalist framework advanced by the Waffle manifesto. The Ross Dowson archive similarly describes Canadian nationalism as a central issue in the split that produced the Forward Group. Because these accounts come from participants or from an archive maintained by the Forward Group, the group's position is best described as its own political orientation rather than as an uncontested assessment of Canada's place in the world economy.

== Publications and NDP activity ==
The group's newspaper was Forward. Sobel states that Wayne Roberts served as editor of Forward beginning in 1974 and continued in that role for about a decade. The Ross Dowson archive contains selected issues of Forward from 1974 to 1984 and selected issues of the Left Caucus Newsletter from 1985 to 1993. McMaster University Library's LSA collection includes Forward NDP manifestos from 1975 and later Left Caucus materials.

The Socialist League participated in the NDP Left Caucus. Kopyto, Doctorow and Darling wrote that Wayne Roberts played a major role in organizing a 1975 Ontario NDP regional conference and that the Left Caucus later won almost 40 per cent of delegates' votes at the 1983 federal NDP convention for a socialist manifesto co-written by Roberts.

== Later years ==
The Socialist League did not take part in the 1977 fusion that created the Revolutionary Workers League/Ligue Ouvrière Révolutionnaire. Webber writes that when the Canadian Trotskyist groups reunited in 1977, Dowson was not involved.

The organization remained active through its newspaper and NDP caucus work into the 1980s. The Ross Dowson archive lists Forward as covering the years 1974 to 1984 and the Left Caucus Newsletter as covering 1985 to 1993. After the mid-1980s, the group's public activity appears to have continued mainly through Left Caucus work in the NDP.

== Associated members ==
Members and supporters of the Socialist League included Ross Dowson and Wayne Roberts. Roberts, Ellie Kirzner, Alice Klein and Michael Hollett later established the alternative newspaper NOW Magazine in Toronto, where Roberts became a columnist.
