= The Mary Sue =

Feminist news website

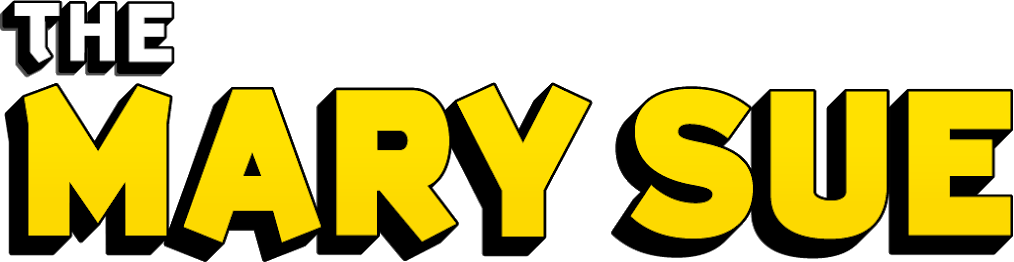

- Screenshot Screenshot of The Mary Sue in June 2026
- Website type: News website
- Available in: English
- Headquarters: New York City, {{{location_country}}}
- Owner: GAMURS Group
- Creator: Abrams Media
- Founders: Dan Abrams, Susana Polo
- Managing director: Dan Van Winkle
- Revenue: $5.1 million
- Employees: 29
- Website: www.themarysue.com
- Registration: Optional
- Users: 973,000+ (2014)
- Launched: February 28, 2011
- Current status: Active

The Mary Sue is a feminist news website launched in 2011 by Abrams Media. The Mary Sue covers topics such geek culture, coding, gaming, achievements of women and other news of interest to a female audience. Geekosystem editor Susana Polo was the managing editor of the website. She was also its founder. The website is based in the United States, with its headquarters in New York City.

The Mary Sue started out as a blog but has grown into a major news publication. It was a sister-website of Mediaite before Abrams Media sold the website to entertainment company GAMURS Group in November 2021.

== History ==
=== Abrams Media ===
The Mary Sue was created on February 28, 2011, by Abrams Media, headed by Dan Abrams. The website started with two editors; intern Jamie Frevele and former Geekosystem editor Susana Polo, who led the website. The website covered topics such as gaming, coding, achievements of women and other topics of interest to female audience and geeks. It billed itself as a "guide to geek girl culture". The Mary Sue was initially a blog and was described as such by multiple news outlets. It was also a sister-website of Mediaite, news website owned by Abrams Media.

The website stated the name The Mary Sue was chosen to "re-appropriate a cliché". In a March 1, 2011 interview with Glamour, Susana Polo clarified that the website's creators thought it would be "funny" to "ironically reference a cliche that is closely but only circumstantially associated with femininity on a website for geek women". Before the website's launch, Susana Polo announced that The Mary Sue would have 11 different logos, each inspired by iconic female characters from fiction.

In June 2014, Abrams Media announced that The Mary Sue has expanded its coverage, and will report on topics such as science, technology and the internet. The website was merged with Geekosystem, meaning all editors of Geekosystem will now work for The Mary Sue. The content of both websites was merged into one. The Mary Sue reported a rise in readership, reaching 973,000 visits in April 2014, a 37% increase over the previous year. President of Abrams Media Bridget Williams told Ad Age that 60% of The Mary Sue's revenue came from programmatic advertising, and that 350 bloggers have applied to be free contributors of the website.

On March 2, 2015, Susana Polo left The Mary Sue and joined video game website Polygon, becoming its first entertainment editor. Polo said that she was "unutterably proud of The Mary Sue" and its impact on the perception of women, but no longer wanted to be "100% in charge". In May 2015, The Mary Sue announced that it would stop covering all news related to the TV series Game of Thrones due to its inclusion of a scene where woman was raped, which the website deemed an unnecessary plot device.

=== GAMURS Group ===
On November 22, 2021, GAMURS Group announced that Abrams Media had sold The Mary Sue to it. CEO of GAMURS Group Riad Chikhani described the acquisition as a "great addition to our website portfolio". Sister-website Mediaite described the event as "bittersweet" and said that it was "sad" that that The Mary Sue was no longer part of the Abrams Media.

In March 2025, editors of The Mary Sue reported being fired due to layoffs. Various news websites owned by GAMURS Group were affected by layoffs in February, March and April 2025, including The Mary Sue. Aftermath reported in April that The Mary Sue was "down to just a handful of new stories a day" due to layoffs.

== Editorial stance ==
The Mary Sue was described as a feminist website by multiple sources. Orange County Register described the website as an "online site that covers pop culture from a feminist perspective". Book by McFarland & Company said that the website is focused on "intersection of geek culture and feminism". The Mary Sue stated that its goal is to provide a place for the "voices of geek women".

Mid-day newspaper described The Mary Sue as a pop culture website that covers news from a feminist perspective and with an "unapologetically opinionated" tone. It said that the website focuses on minorities in entertainment industry such as women and queer people. Uncanny Magazine said that The Mary Sue supports "the language" of DEI and social justice. Conservative magazine Washington Examiner called the website left-wing.

== Activity ==
In September 2014, company ReedPop collaborated with The Mary Sue to write a draft anti-harassment policy for 2014 New York Comic Con. The policy was implemented in October 2015 and included zero tolerance for harassment. Comics Beat said that ReedPop was "lauded" for collaborating with The Mary Sue. At the convention, The Mary Sue provided attendees with breakout space in Jacob Javits Center.

In 2017, six employees of The Mary Sue created a special telephone number called "Mary Sue's Rejection Hotline" that women can give to unwanted men who insist on asking their phone numbers. Upon calling the number, it send the person a text message or a voicemail saying that they made a woman feel uncomfortable and advising them to stop. The number waits an hour before responding.

== Incidents ==
In 2015, The Mary Sue was sued by group Honey Badger Brigade for reporting on how two members of the group were kicked out of the Calgary Expo fan convention for promoting Gamergate campaign; they also sued the convention. The group raised $30,000 for the lawsuit and hired Canadian lawyer Harry Kopyto. Alison Tieman, a member of the group, accused the website of defamation and said its reporting contained false information about her. In August 2018, the group lost the lawsuit after court in Alberta ruled in favor of the Calgary Expo and The Mary Sue.

In August 2016, Gamergate participant Mark Ankucic admitted to infiltrating The Mary Sue as a feminist writer under the pseudonym "Sandy Beaches" and writing several hoax articles where he accused Warmachine of Islamophobia and Final Fantasy VII of sexism.

== Reception ==
In 2011, on the day The Mary Sue launched, Rosa Golijan of NBC News said that the website's founders intended it to be a "comfortable Internet destination for geek girls". She said she was unsure if the site would attract a female geek audience, but she was glad it was trying. She added that the website was initially struggling with choosing its target age group. In 2012, magazine Autostraddle described the website as "one of the few female-dominated corners of the internet" reporting on geek culture and called it "a great place to stay up to date" on the topic.

In February 2015, feminist website AfterEllen described the coverage of The Mary Sue as "wide" and "wickedly funny". It called the website's reporting on women and Gamergate campaign as "particularly astute". In May 2015, magazine The New Republic supported the website's boycott of TV series Game of Thrones and said that it was a "hopeful sign". On the other hand, website IndieWire stated that this would financially hurt The Mary Sue more than the TV series. In 2017, Bustle Magazine said that The Mary Sue will be the reader's "new favorite" if they are interested in reading comic books.

In January 2026, former editor of The Mary Sue, Maddy Myers, writing for The Guardian, said that working for the website in the mid-2010s was a "unique pleasure". However, she also claimed that the site's editors had been subjected to harassment. In an interview with Kotaku, she announced she would be launching her own news blog, Mothership, edited by The Mary Sue founder Susano Polo. She described it as "like what The Mary Sue used to be, but what if it didn't have to publish dozens and dozens of stories a day".
