= Socialist Action (Canada) =

Trotskyist organization in Canada

Socialist Action Ligue pour l'Action socialiste
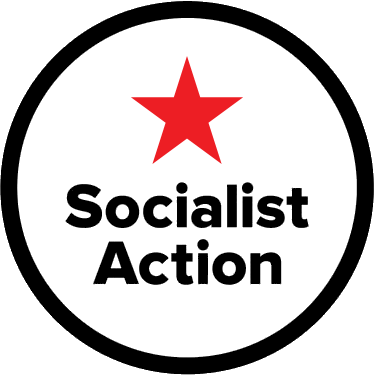
- Abbreviation: SA/LAS
- Federal Secretary: Barry Weisleder
- Founded: 1994
- Split from: Socialist Challenge
- Newspaper: Socialist Action
- Ideology: Anti-capitalism; Anti-corporatism; Marxism; Trotskyism; Revolutionary socialism
- Political position: Far-left
- National affiliation: NDP Socialist Caucus; Quebec Solidaire (in Quebec)

Website
- www.socialistaction.ca

Socialist Action (French: Ligue pour l'Action socialiste, lit. 'League for Socialist Action') is a Trotskyist political organization in Canada. Its members write for and distribute the North American newspaper, Socialist Action, published in San Francisco by the American group of the same name. It has a youth affiliate called Youth for Socialist Action (YSA). It directs the activities of the NDP Socialist Caucus.

== Origins and international solidarity ==
SA/LAS was formed in 1994 by a group of socialists expelled from, or who quit Socialist Challenge/Gauche Socialiste when the latter renounced democratic centralism as an organizational principal for a revolutionary party. In June 1995, a proposal was made at the Fourteenth World Congress of the Fourth International to recognize Socialist Action as an "organization of partisans of the FI in the Canadian state," but this proposal was blocked by Gauche Socialiste, the official FI section in Quebec.

Socialist Challenge, the FI's former section in English Canada, dissolved in 1995 into the New Socialist Group where it formed the Fourth International Caucus, which was recognized as the FI's official section in English Canada. The New Socialist Group dissolved in 2017.

== Work in the New Democratic Party ==
SA/LAS members and supporters direct the activity of the New Democratic Party Socialist Caucus (SC). Socialist Action federal secretary Barry Weisleder has served as chairperson of the Socialist Caucus since its inception. The Socialist Caucus seeks to turn the labour-based party sharply to the left. SA/LAS and the SC played a role in stopping removal of the term “socialist” from the NDP constitution at its federal convention in Vancouver, B.C. in June 2011. In September 2011, Socialist Action federal secretary Barry Weisleder won the nomination to be the Ontario NDP's candidate in Thornhill in the 2011 provincial election. Within 48 hours, the party's provincial secretary rescinded the nomination without explanation.

== Political programme ==
SA/LAS identifies with the labour, anti-war, feminist, queer liberation, environmental protection, anti-poverty and international communist movements. Supporting the Palestinian people striving for a unified, democratic-secular homeland is also a claimed goal of this Marxist group. SA/LAS demands an end to the wars of occupation in Afghanistan, Iraq, Pakistan and Libya, restoration of diplomatic relations between Canada and Iran, and that Canada leave NATO.

== The Quebec question ==
SA/LAS supports Quebec's right to national self-determination, and upholds the right to self-government of aboriginal peoples. In Quebec, LAS members participate in the mass leftist party Quebec Solidaire, which stands for Quebec independence and opposes the neo-liberal business agenda.

== Labour movement ==
SA/LAS supports a transformation of Canada's unions into militant, democratic labour organizations that oppose employers' plans for labour concessions and government austerity policies . The organization supports public ownership of the major sectors of the economy under workers' and community democratic control.
