= Honey badger (men's rights) =

Female men's rights activist

A honey badger, or less often FeMRA (female men's rights activist), is a term for a woman who publicly advocates for men's rights, particularly one who also criticizes feminism. They are seen as important to providing breadth and legitimacy to the men's rights movement, as men may be more easily criticized as advocating only for their own interests.

The term "Honey Badgers" in this sense was coined by the curators of the men's rights website A Voice for Men, after a YouTube video about a small carnivore, the honey badger, known for being indomitable, went viral. The nickname has been adopted by some women, most notably an online collective known as the Honey Badger Brigade.

== Women and the men's rights movement ==
=== 20th century ===
The modern men's rights movement grew alongside and either out of, or in reaction to, the second-wave feminism movement of the 1970s. Initially some elements of the current two movements coexisted in harmony, each interested in fighting sexism and rewriting traditional gender roles. The National Coalition for Men, a current men's rights group, was founded in 1977 with the goal to "promote awareness of how gender based expectations limit men legally, socially and psychologically"; at first many of its members called themselves "feminist men". Warren Farrell, often considered the intellectual father of the men's rights movement, was a major figure in 1970s second-wave feminism, and served on the board of the New York City National Organization for Women (NOW), one of the leading feminist groups.

The movements diverged in later decades. Farrell split from NOW after it came out in favor of granting sole child custody to the mother after divorce; he began to believe that feminists were more interested in power than equality. His 1993 book The Myth of Male Power: Why Men are the Disposable Sex became the foundation of the men's rights movement, writing that women's choices are responsible for the gender pay gap, that men are also the victims of domestic violence, that government programs to benefit women only exacerbate inequality, and that the effect of women's sexual power was greater than any of men's societal advantages.

Two prominent 20th-century female men's rights activists also started in the 1970s feminist movement before breaking away. Erin Pizzey, an English novelist and anti domestic-violence advocate, was in the UK Women's Liberation Movement, and opened Refuge, the first and largest battered women's shelter in England in 1971, before arguing that men also need support, and calling feminism "the Evil Empire". Anne Cools is a Barbadian-Canadian activist and politician, the first black member and the longest serving member of the Senate of Canada. She founded one of Canada's first battered women's shelters in 1974, before teaching that domestic violence can be from women against men as well, and trying, unsuccessfully, to pass laws ensuring both parents access to children.

=== 21st century ===
In 2009, inspired by Farrell's work, Paul Elam founded the website A Voice for Men (AVfM). This became the most popular site of the manosphere, the men's rights movement on the Internet, and he became the unofficial leader of the 21st century men's rights movement. The term "Honey Badgers" was started to refer to female men's rights activists on A Voice for Men after the viral YouTube video about the animal.

There have come to be several prominent women among the modern men's rights movement. Movement activists estimate 10 percent of their base are female. The Southern Poverty Law Center, which classifies AVfM as a hate group, says that having women that agree with them is critical to defend against claims of misogyny. The public support of prominent women legitimizes the issues of the men's movement as those of a broad cultural concern. The first three speakers on the first day of the AVfM sponsored first International Conference on Men's Issues in 2014 were all women, starting with Cools.

== Janet Bloomfield ==
Janet Bloomfield (her pen name) was born 1979 or 1980 in northern Ontario, Canada, into a Seventh-day Adventist family, with three brothers. She grew up on a hobby farm in a fundamentalist Christian enclave in rural Alberta. Her parents divorced when she was a preteen.

Bloomfield went to the University of Western Ontario to study film theory, but after graduation made the conscious decision to become a wife and mother. She continued to the University of Victoria, both to study for a Master of Business Administration, and to find a husband. She married, had her first child, and became a stay-at-home mother. In October 2012, (Note: McKeon says Judgy Bitch was launched in April 2013, but since the Internet Archive has a substantial archive of its content from December 1, 2012, we are going with the Brook Lynn date of October 2012.) she started a blog named JudgyBitch.com with a college friend, writing about how her friends were disdainful of her choice to be a homemaker, and dependent on a man; about how when her parents divorced, her mother was able to win child custody and turn her and her three brothers against their father; and how even her film theory courses taught students to view movies through a feminist filter. Bloomfield's views became aligned with the online Men's rights movement (MRM), and in 2013 some of her work was republished on A Voice for Men.

In 2016, Bloomfield was living in Thunder Bay, Ontario, with her husband, young son, and two daughters. She was the head of social media for A Voice for Men. She supported abortion rights in the first trimester, and women's right to choose whether to work or stay at home (though believing most would choose to be homemakers). However, she opposed women's right to vote, writing that women historically made bad decisions, especially on economics, defense, and immigration, while being immune from conscription and therefore the blood consequences of those decisions. She believed some women could earn the right to vote by having sons, husbands, or serving in the military. Bloomfield was also a prominent supporter of the Women Against Feminism social media campaign, and said she knew the anonymous founder. She appeared on Viceland, the BBC, the NBC Today Show and on the syndicated The Doctors. She received numerous death threats, and promised to defend herself with her crossbow.

In January 2019, Bloomfield retired, closing her blog and her Twitter and YouTube accounts; she wrote that she could defend herself, but she could not defend her children who were being stalked and harassed by adults online due to her activism. She allowed many of her articles to be moved to the website FEMoid.

== Karen Straughan ==
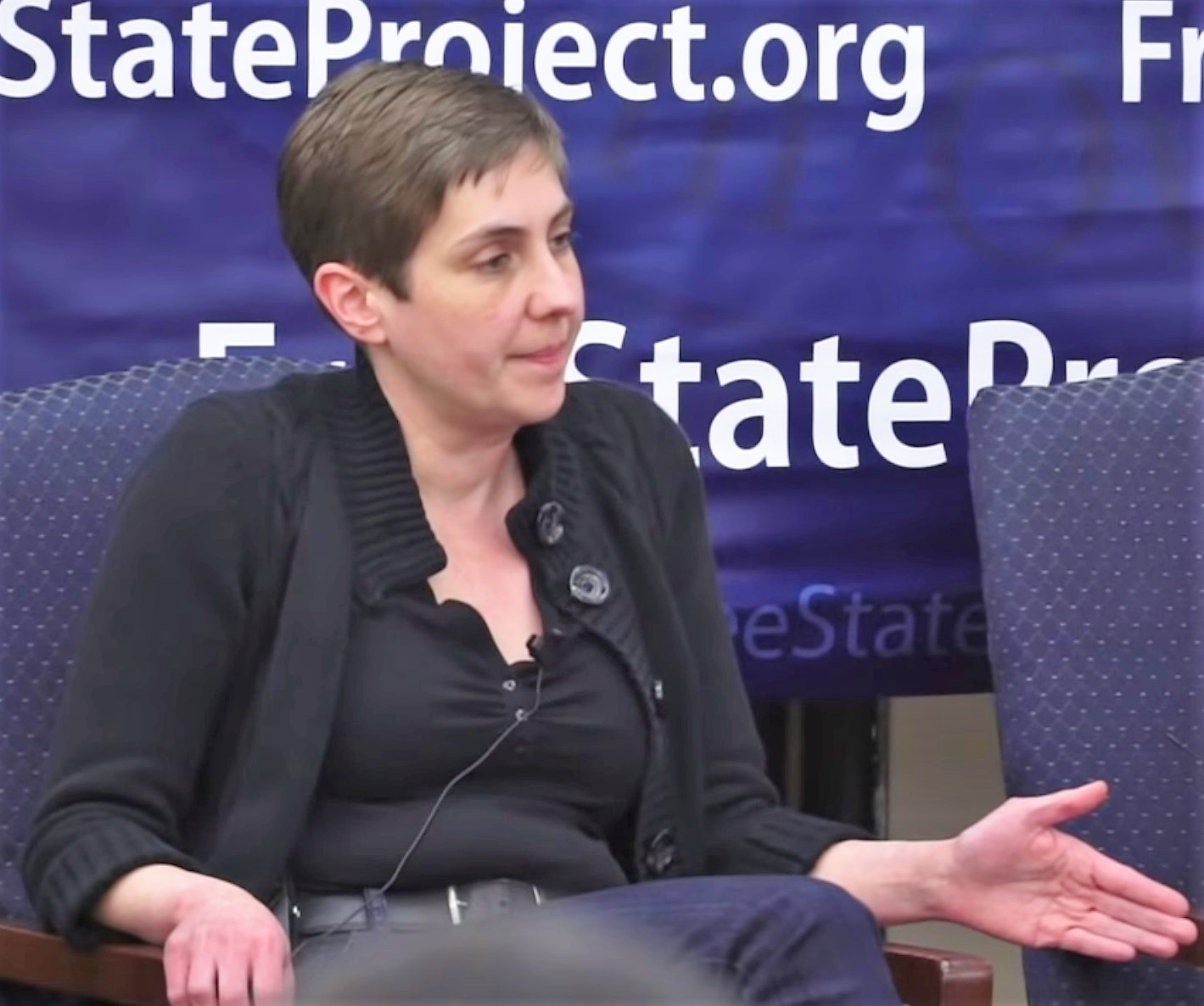
Straughan speaks at the Free State Project in 2014

Karen Straughan is a divorced mother of two boys and a girl, who lives in Edmonton, Alberta. She was born and raised in Sherwood Park, just east of Edmonton, as the youngest of three sisters. Her father was a mechanic who taught her to work with her hands, and her mother was a tomboy who taught her self-sufficiency and treated her wounds after fights.

As an adult, Straughan worked as a part-time waitress while writing erotic fiction for women as a side line (she is self-educated and bisexual), and discovered the men's rights movement when she and other authors decided to troll a MRM forum, only to find that she agreed with the forum posters. Another impetus was the inequality of child custody laws: when Straughan was going through her divorce, she found herself the presumptive custodial parent, and legally unable to waive a child support order against her ex-husband. When she started another relationship, she found that her boyfriend had helped raise a stepdaughter, but hadn't been able to see her for eight years. In 2011, she started a blog, "Owning Your Shit", and a YouTube channel named "Girl Writes What", where she discussed her views supporting the men's rights movement; in three years her early video "Feminism and the Disposable Male" had over a million views. By 2013, she acted as a spokesperson for Men's Rights Edmonton. In 2016, Straughan earned enough from YouTube ads and speaking fees to quit her part-time restaurant job.

== Alison Tieman ==
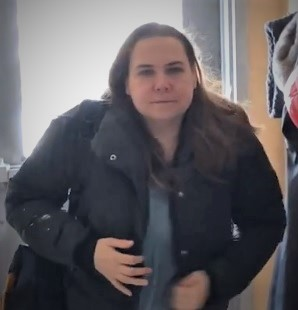
Tieman in 2018

Alison Tieman, also known as "Typhon Blue", lives with her husband in Kelvington, Saskatchewan, Canada, east of Saskatoon. She was born on December 20, 1977, and grew up a feminist, like her mother, who was one of the founders of Calgary's first Take Back the Night marches in 1975. Tieman became focused on gender equality issues, such as the male-only draft, after returning from an all-girls boarding school at age 15. She became more interested in men's issues at age 16, when her mother gave her a copy of The Princess at the Window: A New Gender Morality by Donna Laframboise, a critique of contemporary feminism. She began formulating her own theories on gender, which she posted on her blog at genderratic.com. She says she focused more on men, as their voices were not being heard at the time. This drew the attention of Paul Elam, founder of A Voice for Men, who asked her to write for his group.

In 2013 Tieman acted as the Saskatoon spokesperson for A Voice for Men, defending men's rights posters put up there, mirroring Straughan's role in Edmonton. In 2014, Tieman acted as a spokesperson for both AVfM and Men's Rights Canada on multiple occasions.

== Theryn Meyer ==
Theryn Meyer is a Canadian-South African transgender woman. In 2011, Meyer moved from Paarl, to Dawson Creek, British Columbia. She gained prominence as a YouTuber discussing mens rights activism and antifeminist topics. While studying at Simon Fraser University, she was president of the Simon Fraser University Advocacy for Men and Boys (SFUAMB) group. Originally identifying as a feminist, she later turned against feminism, labelling herself an “afeminist”. While studying she wrote on third-wave feminism for A Voice for Men. As a trans woman, she opposed aspects of the LGBTQ movement. In 2017, she publicly opposed Bill C-16 which added gender expression and gender identity as protected grounds to the Canadian Human Rights Act. She gave evidence at a hearing on the bill at the Canadian senate. Meyer appeared on the program The Agenda with Steve Paikin and debated the issue alongside Jordan Peterson. Meyer hosted a talk with Peterson in Vancouver. In 2018, she hosted an event with ContraPoints at the University of British Columbia. She worked as a director on the video entitled "Opulence".

== Honey Badger Brigade ==
Honey Badger Brigade
- Named after: The Crazy Nastyass Honey Badger video
- Formation: 2013; 13 years ago
- Founder: Karen Straughan, Alison Tieman, Hannah Wallen
- Purpose: Men's rights activism
- President: Alison Tieman
- Revenue: Can$120,000 (2016)
- Staff: 4 (2016)
- Website: honeybadgerbrigade.com

The Honey Badger Brigade is an online forum and podcast. In 2013, three of the women posting on A Voice for Men, Straughan, Tieman, and Hannah Wallen (using pen name Della Burton), founded the Honey Badger Brigade website and Honey Badger Radio podcast. Tieman was the head of the podcast, and designed the Honey Badger Brigade graphics. Bloomfield became a prominent poster on the website. Other prominent female Honey Badger Brigade members included:

- Rachel Edwards, started a Honey Badger Radio spinoff focusing on nerd culture
- Kristal Garcia, a black woman from New York City and former sex worker
- Jessica Kenney, also known as Jess Kay, a veterinary assistant and manager of the I Don't Need Feminism Facebook page, who became interested in boys' issues after having a son

In 2016 Tieman incorporated the group as Honey Badger Brigade, Inc., and became its president. She was able to quit her part-time job, due to the $10,000 monthly revenue raised by the Honey Badger Radio podcast, which was enough to also pay for two full-time and two part-time staff.

The Honey Badger Brigade continued an association with A Voice for Men; at the first International Conference on Men's Issues, in 2014 in Detroit, organized by AVfM, the Badgers crowdfunded $8000 to fly there as "human shields" against protestors. The 2019 International Conference on Men's Issues was hosted by the Honey Badger Brigade in Chicago.

Brigade members Edwards, Garcia, Kay, Straughan, and Tieman were interviewed in the 2016 documentary film The Red Pill. Straughan was the most prominent, talking about how men's lives, whether in the military or dangerous jobs, were regarded as more disposable than those of women. In 2017, Straughan, Tieman, and Wallen went to Australia on a Honey Badger "Down Under tour", to promote screenings of The Red Pill there.

=== Expulsion from the Calgary Expo ===
In 2015, the Honey Badger Brigade crowdfunded $9000 on their website for eight members including Straughan and Tieman to attend the Calgary Expo, with the message:

In April of this year, the Honey Badgers plan to put on a booth at the Calgary Comics and Entertainment Expo! We plan to infiltrate nerd culture cunningly disguised as their own. Each of us has been carefully crafting a persona of nerdiness through decades of dedication to comics, science fiction, fantasy, comedy games and other geekery, waiting for this moment, our moment to slip among the unaware. Once there we will start distributing the totalitarian message that nerd and gamer culture is… perfectly wonderful just as it is and should be left alone to go it's [sic] own way.

The convention booth represented Tieman's "Xenospora" webcomic. The GamerGate logo on a poster on their booth attracted online harassment, because of its association with online harassment of women. Tieman and a male associate were criticized for attending the "Women Into Comics" panel and giving their views as men's rights activists to derail the discussion. On April 17, the Calgary Expo expelled the Honey Badger Brigade booth, and banned them from future events, stating the group was actively disregarding the Expo mandate of being a positive and safe event for everyone.

Tieman and the Honey Badger Brigade sued the Calgary Expo and website The Mary Sue, which wrote about the incident, for expelling and allegedly defaming them. They crowdfunded $30,000 to finance the case, and hired controversial disbarred lawyer Harry Kopyto for paralegal advice. They lost their case on August 1, 2018.

== Other Honey Badgers ==
Other prominent female men's rights activists that have been listed among the Honey Badgers include:

- Daisy Cousens, an Australian actress and conservative commentator, daughter of actor Peter Cousens.
- Diana Davison, a Canadian YouTuber, and founder of The Lighthouse Project, a non-profit that helps people falsely accused of sexual assault.
- Elizabeth Hobson, an English activist for the Justice for Men and Boys political party.
- Tara J. Palmatier, "a Shrink 4 Men", a psychologist from the US West Coast specializing in counseling men in abusive relationships with women.
- Helen Smith, a forensic psychologist from Knoxville, Tennessee, and blogger for PJ Media.
- Deepika Narayan Bhardwaj, Bhardwaj rose to prominence after producing the documentary Martyrs of Marriage, which covered abuses of criminal section 498A (Anti-dowry law) by brides and their families.
