= List of Canadian socialist parties =

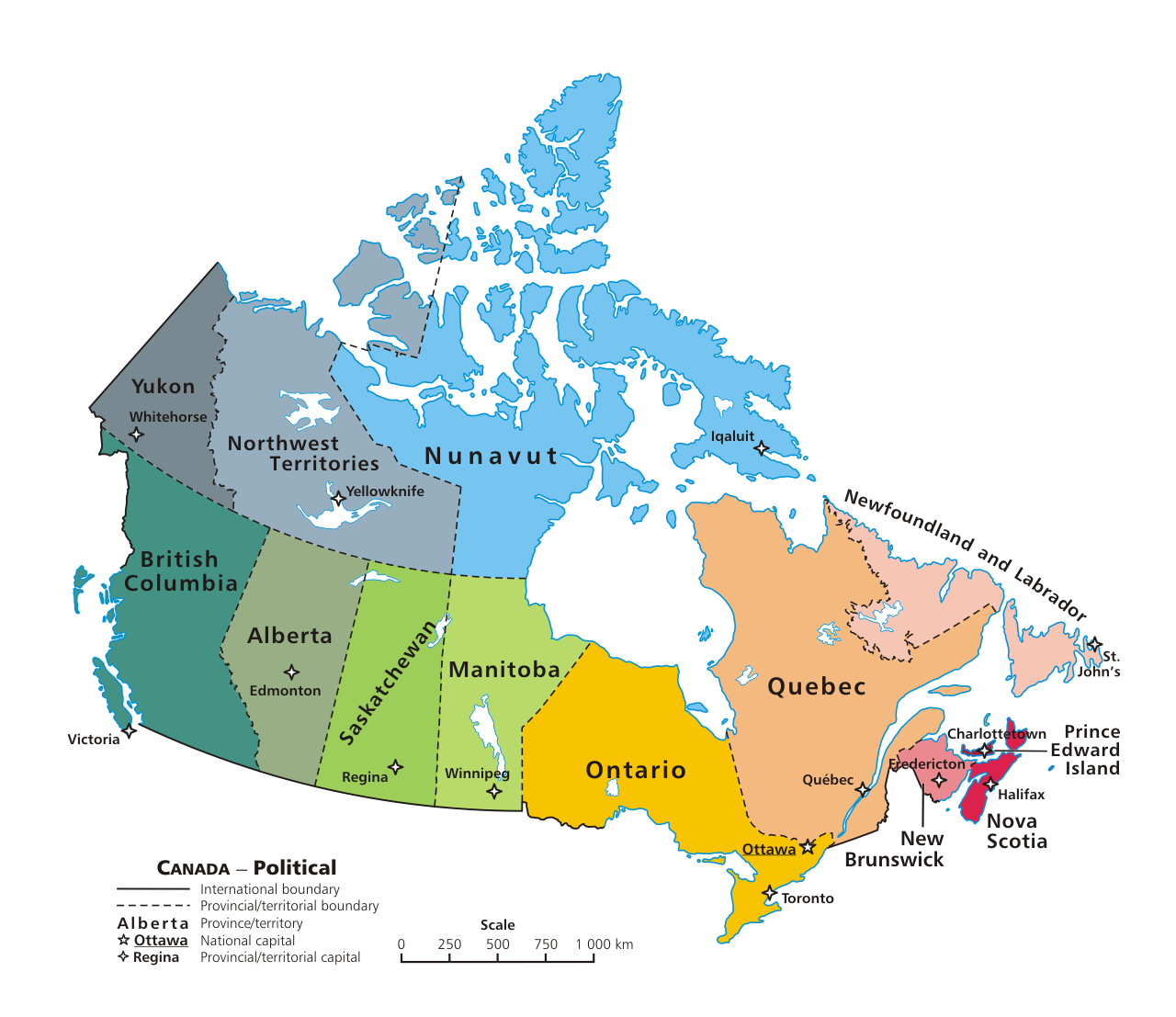
The provinces of Canada

The nation of Canada has seen an array of socialist political parties over the years since 1896, including organisations which are federal and provincial in scope. These have run the gamut from reformist social democratic to anti-reformist impossibilist electorally-oriented organisations to revolutionary socialist and communist groups. A list of these parties follows, listed chronologically by their date of establishment.

== Organisations ==
=== Established in the 1890s ===
- Socialist Labour Party of Canada (SLP) — In October 1894 Canadian supporters of the Socialist Labor Party of America, a group headed by party newspaper editor Daniel DeLeon, established a Toronto section of that party — the first socialist organisation to be established in the country. A second section of the American SLP was subsequently established in the Western Ontario city of Hamilton. In 1896 the Canadian sections – which remained loyal to the American party's orthodox principles — were spun off to form a new national organisation, the Socialist Labour Party of Canada. The SLP was particularly strong in the Eastern provinces of Ontario and Quebec but by 1898 also had local units in Winnipeg, Manitoba, and Vancouver, British Columbia. Although impossibilist in general orientation — unwilling to support ameliorative reforms within the framework of capitalist politics – the SLP of Canada did run candidates for public office and competed head-to-head with the moderate Canadian Socialist League in four Toronto constituencies in 1902.
- Canadian Socialist League (CSL) — In the summer of 1898 moderate dissidents from the SLP left that organisation to establish their own, calling their group the Canadian Socialist League. The CSL launched its first local in the city of Montreal and followed this with other local groups across Eastern Canada. The CSL was structured as a loose federation, with each local group free to implement its own programme, so long as that was 'consistent with socialist principles.' These local groups were reformist in orientation, including many ethically-based Christian socialists and gradualist Fabian socialists. The newspaper The Western Clarion was established in Vancouver in July 1902 as The Canadian Socialist by George Wrigley, a long-time supporter of the CSL. By 1902 the CSL had more than 60 locals across Canada, primarily located in Ontario and British Columbia, but also including groups in Manitoba, New Brunswick, and the North-West Territories (present-day Alberta and Saskatchewan and the Territories). The organisation published newspapers and pamphlets and ran candidates for public office, in Ontario beginning in 1902. The best result was obtained by millionaire magazine publisher Gaylord Wilshire, who received 425 out of 2,000 votes cast in his district.
- United Socialist Labour Party of British Columbia (USLP) — In 1899 many British Columbian members of the Socialist Labour Party of Canada came into disagreement with that organisation's rather inflexible orthodoxy and they split the SLP to form a so-called 'Socialist Club' in Vancouver. In April 1900 these British Columbians formally organised themselves as the United Socialist Labour Party of British Columbia. The organisation differed from the DeLeonist SLP on the question of trade unionism, seeking to work with the established craft unions of the Vancouver Trades and Labour Council rather than building explicitly socialist dual unions. The USLP did not stand aloof from other organisations, running a joint candidate with British Columbia locals of the Canadian Socialist League in the election of 1900 — the first socialist to contest an election in the province.
  - Socialist Party of Vancouver (SPV) — Shortly after its formation the United Socialist Labour Party of British Columbia changed its name to the Socialist Party of Vancouver.

=== Established in the 1900s ===
Cover of a pamphlet published in Vancouver, BC, by the Socialist Party of Canada

- Socialist Party of British Columbia (SPBC) — In the summer of 1901 Vancouver socialists with roots in the Canadian Socialist League decided to establish themselves as a new organisation calling itself the Socialist Party of British Columbia. This group was inspired by American counterparts who were establishing themselves as the Socialist Party of America at this same juncture, and the new British Columbia party borrowed the programme of the American national organisation wholesale. The SPBC passed a 17-point set of 'Immediate demands' that focused upon moderate ameliorative reforms such as establishment of direct legislation, universal suffrage, the 44-hour work week, and minimum wage legislation. Socialist propaganda found a warm audience among the workers of the resource industries of British Columbia and from 1903 that province surpassed Ontario as the centre of the Canadian socialist movement. The election of 1903 saw two members of the SPBC elected to the provincial legislature, the Welsh-born miner Parker Williams and J. H. Hawthornthwaite, formerly a Liberal-Labour legislator who had switched allegiances to the socialists earlier that year.
- Revolutionary Socialist Party of Canada (RSP) — Immediately after the formation of the Socialist Party of British Columbia, patterned as it was after the electorally-oriented Socialist Party of America, a group of disaffected radicals bolted the organisation. Early in 1902 they established themselves as the Revolutionary Socialist Party. The RSP was concentrated in the town of Nanaimo on Vancouver Island, drawing its primary support from workers in the mining and timber industries. The organisation probably had between 60 and 100 members at the time of its formation and issued a newspaper called The Clarion as its official organ. The leading figure in the RSP was newspaper editor Eugene T. Kingsley, a former member of the Socialist Labor Party of America who had lost both his legs in an industrial accident in California. Staunchly impossibilist, the programme of the RSP called for the abolition of capitalism and the wage system with absolutely no ameliorative 'immediate demands.' Despite this uncompromising position, in December 1902 the RSP ran a candidate in a by-election in the North Nanaimo riding, garnering 37% of the vote against the winning Conservative Party candidate. A reunification with the Socialist Party of British Columbia followed in 1903 and by the end of the year adherents of anti-reformist 'impossibilism' had come to dominate the joint organisation.
- Socialist Party of Manitoba (SPM) — The Socialist Party of Manitoba was launched in November 1902. The group sought to advance a mild programme almost entirely limited to reform initiatives, such as universal suffrage, direct legislation, abolition of standing armies, implementation of the eight-hour day, establishment of old age pensions, and implementation of compulsory public education. Located in a largely rural province, the SPM had a small membership almost entirely contained in the city of Winnipeg.
- Socialist Party of Ontario (SPO) — In 1903 a convention attended by about 50 Ontario members of the Canadian Socialist League constituted themselves as the Socialist Party of Ontario. The SPO was somewhat more radical than its Manitoba counterpart, with its programme accepting ameliorative reform measures in general terms as "democratic and therefore socialist" while foregoing the construction of a simplistic list of such measures desired. Instead, the SPO set for itself 'the object of conquering the power of governments and using them for the purpose of transforming the present system of private distribution into the collective ownership of all the people'. This organisation proved to be short-lived, with its members joining the Socialist Party of Canada early in 1905.
- Socialist Party of the Yukon Territory (SPYT) — Established in 1904 from previous socialist clubs, the SPYT grew to have around 90 enrolled members. It did not run candidates in elections and was used as a means for educating people on socialist politics.
- Socialist Party of Canada (SPC) — With two elected members of the legislative assembly and a strong network of local party organisations, by 1904 the Socialist Party of British Columbia had emerged as the strongest and most influential Canadian socialist organisation. The party's 4th Annual Convention, held in Vancouver in December 1904, was attended also by members of the Socialist Party of Manitoba and others from around the Dominion. Yielding to a suggestion from these visitors, the 1904 convention decided to expand the organisation's horizons, taking on a national scope and rechristening itself the Socialist Party of Canada. The Western Clarion, which had floundered earlier that year, was revived as the new official publication of the SPC. Speakers were sent out on the road to help establish local groups of the new national organisation. Although by no means a mass organisation the early SPC did manage to carve for itself a significant place in Canadian politics, emerging as the third largest party in the Dominion between the years 1905 and 1910. The party's base of support remained in British Columbia although it had significant support in the western and prairie provinces of Alberta, Saskatchewan, and Manitoba, and a lesser level of support in Ontario. The SPC had very little support in Quebec, New Brunswick, or Nova Scotia. The SPC was not a member of the Second International, refusing to join that body on account of its acceptance of the British Labour Party, seen as a hotbed of arch-reformism.
- Socialist Party of Alberta — Members of the Socialist Party of Canada were active in Alberta starting in 1904, in particular in the election of Charles O'Brien as MLA. (There is a Wikipedia article under this name but the name Socialist Party of Canada (Alberta) would be more appropriate.)
- Social Democratic Party of British Columbia (SDPBC) — In May 1907 disaffected British Columbia members of the Socialist Party of Canada left that organisation over policy disagreements, including especially the growing tendency of the organisation to eschew all demands for reform short of the ultimate demand for complete abolition of capitalism and the wage system. The group was strongly influenced by the Socialist Party of America on the one hand and Henry Hyndman's Social Democratic Federation in the UK on the other and sought to advance a moderate, electorally-oriented socialism which forged close alliances with the established trade unions. The chief organizer of the group was Ernest Burns, a British immigrant who had formerly held membership in Hyndman's SDF before spending time in the United States as an organiser for the People's Party and the Socialist Party in Washington state. The SDPBC would become one of the primary contingents leading to the formation of the Social Democratic Party of Canada in 1911.

=== Established in the 1910s ===
- Social Democratic Party of Canada (SDP) — By 1910 supporters of orthodox anti-reformist 'Impossibilism' were handily in control of the Socialist Party of Canada, leading to the exit of a steady stream of members who believed in the efficacy of palliative reform measures and the desirability of working with non-socialist groups in the labor movement. In 1911 these disaffected former members of the SPC formed a new organisation, the Social Democratic Party, to give form to their beliefs and activities. The SDP sought to make common cause with the network of localized 'Labour Parties' which had emerged in the previous decade and managed to elect one of its members to the Toronto Board of Control in 1913. The SDP had a program that generally reflected the ideas of Marxism, but its active membership ran the gamut from revolutionaries to orthodox supporters of the Second International to Christian socialists. Paralleling a tendency in the Socialist Party of America, the SDP included local units of immigrants who spoke the languages of their European homeland, predominately Ukrainians, Finns, Poles, and Yiddish-speaking Jews.

=== Established in the 1930s ===
- The Socialist Party of Canada (WSM) was founded in June 1931 in Winnipeg, Manitoba, by several former members of the Socialist Party of Canada. These included George Armstrong and Jim Milne, author of a history of the party and its predecessor. While Jim Brownrigg claimed continuity with the original party, this claim was disputed by various members of both the original party and the new party (Harry Morrison, Isaac Rab, Jack McDonald, Bill Pritchard, R. M. Roddy) . The new party adopted the policies of the Socialist Party of Great Britain which rejected Leninism, social democracy and trade unionism in favour of a belief in "revolutionary Marxism and democratic revolution".
- The Co-operative Commonwealth Federation (CCF) was founded in 1932 in Calgary, with its first convention held in Regina the following year. In 1961 it joined with the Canadian Labour Congress to form the New Democratic Party (NDP), which shed much of the CCF's socialist rhetoric. Alberta's old CCF guard preserved a presence at least in Edmonton, Alberta, with the formation of the Woodsworth-Irvine Socialist Fellowship that held regular educational and social events into the 1990s.

== See also ==
- List of political parties in Canada
