= Michael Hollett =

Canadian newspaper editor

Michael Hollett, born 1955, is the founder and president of North by Northeast (NXNE) music festival which happens every June in Toronto since 1995. Hollett is also founder of the print and online arts magazine, NEXT, available online at nextmag.ca since December, 2020. Hollett is co-founder of Toronto's longest-running free alternative newsweekly, Now Magazine. He was editor and publisher of Now from 1981 to 2016.

== Early life ==
Hollett was born in Oakville, Ontario to journalist parents. He grew up in Toronto's Flemingdon Park, attending high school and CEGEP in Ottawa and Montreal. While at York University, studying English, Hollett became editor of the university newspaper, Excalibur during the late 1970s, where he met his future partner, Alice Klein. They were in left-wing politics during this period and were members of the Socialist League.

Hollett went on to edit small-town newspapers throughout Ontario, including the Orangeville Citizen, the Caledon Citizen and the "Halton Hills Herald", Georgetown, Ontario.

== Career ==
In 1981, Hollett co-founded NOW with his partner Alice Klein. The paper has remained independent ever since. Although a number of alternative weekly newspapers had been attempted in Toronto without success in the past, Now's early decision to be distributed without charge proved to be crucial in its success. Buzz Burza helped develop the free distribution initiative after the paper initially charged 50 cents per copy.

The magazine also continues to reflect the editorial slant that Hollett brought to it, notably favouring the New Democratic Party (NDP) politically.

In 1995, Hollett became a founder of the North by Northeast (NXNE) music festival.

In 2004, he provided the liner notes for a greatest hits CD release by the band Blue Rodeo.

Hollett served on the board of directors of the Association of Alternative Newsmedia (AAN) a continental organization representing alt weeklies and digital media across North America from 2009 until 2016. He was also a founding member of the Alternative Media Foundation. Hollett resigned from both boards when he resigned from NOW Magazine in 2016. He resigned from NOW to focus on growing NXNE and to spend more time writing. He is a founding board member of Music Canada Live, launched in 2014, and remains active in the association. Hollett continues to travel the world attending music festivals and conferences, often as a speaker, expanding NXNE's contacts and looking for talent to book. He spoke at the Golden Melody Awards, Conference and Festival in Taipei, Taiwan in June, 2018 and again in 2019 returning in 2024 to speak at Taiwan JadeFest.

== Personal life ==
Hollett resides in the Toronto neighbourhood of Riverdale. He is an avid hockey fan and player, and was active with the Friends of Maple Leaf Gardens, an organization dedicated to the preservation of the historic hockey arena in downtown Toronto who helped preserve and re-purpose the building.
