= Social Democratic Party of British Columbia =

Provincial political party in Canada (1907–1911)

The Social Democratic Party of British Columbia (SDPBC) was a social democratic organisation established in May 1907 by defecting members of the impossibilist Socialist Party of Canada. Headed by pioneer Canadian socialist Ernest Burns, the SDPBC was a key constituent group behind the formation of the Social Democratic Party of Canada in 1911.

== Organisational history ==
=== Background ===
Prior to the formation of the Socialist Party of British Columbia in 1901, socialists in the Canadian province of British Columbia were split into approximately five small local groups, professing allegiance to several fledgling national organisations located outside the province. In an effort to unify these scattered forces, a unity convention was held and the Vancouver-based Socialist Party of British Columbia (SPBC) was founded.

A strong American influence marked the new organisation, reflected in the group's leading personnel and programme. Chief provincial organiser of the SPBC was Ernest Burns, formerly an activist in the Social Democratic Federation in Great Britain before moving to North America where he organised for the People's Party and the Socialist Party in Washington. The reform-oriented programme of the Socialist Party of America was adopted wholesale by the new Canadian group.

The initial moderate orientation of the SPBC proved unsatisfactory for the revolutionary socialist local organisation in Nanaimo, however, which soon broke from the SPBC to form the Revolutionary Socialist Party of Canada. Pressure was brought to bear to radicalise the party and in January 1902 at the second annual convention of the SPBC the Socialist Party of America's programme was scrapped and a new impossibilist document eliminating all "immediate demands" was adopted. A reunification of the SPBC and the Revolutionary Socialist Party followed later that same year. At the 1904 convention of the SPBC this organisation expanded its horizons, christening itself the Socialist Party of Canada (CPC), although remaining in practice a British Columbia-dominated group.

This move to the left created a new layer of discontent, however, as so-called constructive socialists sought to shift the organisation's orientation from largely ineffectual radical propaganda to electoral politics. It was this disagreement over the programme and policies of the CPC which fueled a 1907 split and the formation of a new organisation known as the Social Democratic Party of British Columbia.

=== Formation ===
The formation of the Social Democratic Party of British Columbia was guided by Socialist Party founder Ernest Burns, who led a formal split from the CPC in May 1907.

== See also ==
- List of Canadian socialist parties
