= Pathfinder tendency =

Group of historically Trotskyist organizations

Logo of Pathfinder Press

The Pathfinder tendency is the unofficial name of a group of historically Trotskyist organizations that cooperate politically and organizationally with the Socialist Workers Party of the United States and support its solidarity with the Cuban Revolution and the Communist Party of Cuba.

The group operates Pathfinder Bookstores, which sell the products of the SWP's publishing arm, Pathfinder Press. It is also known as the International Communist League, although this term is not widely used, and can cause confusion with other organizations of the same name. The Communist Leagues, even those in non-English-speaking countries, sell the SWP publication The Militant.

== History ==
In the 1980s, the Socialist Workers Party and its international supporters within the Fourth International (FI) broke from many of Trotskyism's traditional positions, including the theory of Permanent Revolution, and embraced positions that marked a political convergence with the Cuban Communist Party and the Frente Sandinista de Liberación Nacional. Upon adopting these new positions, the SWP expelled FI supporters from the party, and SWP supporters abroad split from or attempted to take over sections of the FI in various countries. By the late 1980s, this process was completed and national sections of the FI had either been taken over with supporters of the international's mainstream being expelled—this happened with the Revolutionary Workers League in Canada, the Socialist Action League in New Zealand and the SWP in the US—or supporters of the US SWP had split from FI sections and founded their own organisations, as occurred in Australia, Sweden and Britain.

In 1990, the SWP and its supporters formally left the FI. Supporters of the SWP internationally renamed their organisations the Communist League in each country. Since the creation of the Pathfinder tendency, new Communist Leagues have formed to organise previously existing groups of supporters in Iceland and France.

The Youth sections of the Pathfinder Tendency are increasingly active in the World Federation of Democratic Youth. The Young Socialists of USA, Britain and New Zealand became members of the Federation in 1999.

== Sections ==
- Australia – Communist League (defunct)
- Britain – Communist League
- Canada – Communist League, founded as the "Revolutionary Workers League/Ligue Ouvrière Révolutionnaire" (RWL) in 1977 as the result of a merger of the League for Socialist Action (LSA), the Revolutionary Marxist Group (RMG) and the Groupe Marxiste Revolutionaire.
- Iceland – Communist League (defunct)
- New Zealand – Communist League (defunct)
- Sweden – Communist League (Kommunistiska Förbundet) (defunct)
- United States – Socialist Workers Party

Since the 2000s, the Pathfinder tendency has attempted to consolidate its sections by moving members from smaller sections to central locations, including across national boundaries. In 2022, Communist League members in Australia folded their branches and moved to Sydney to consolidate there; later that year members of the Communist League in New Zealand also relocated to Sydney to consolidate CL members from the Pacific region there. Similarly, the Communist League of Sweden dissolved in 2011 to relocate to London, as did the Communist League of Iceland in 2007.

== See also ==
- Pathfinder Mural
