= Douglas Wilson (activist) =

Canadian gay activist

Doug Wilson
- Born: October 11, 1950; Meadow Lake, Saskatchewan, Canada
- Died: September 26, 1992 (aged 41); Toronto, Ontario, Canada
- Cause of death: AIDS-related pneumonia
- Education: University of Saskatchewan
- Years active: 1975-1992
- Organization(s): Stubblejumper Press, Toronto Board of Education, New Democratic Party
- Known for: Gay activism
- Partner: Peter McGehee (1975–1991)

Douglas Wilson (1950–1992) was a Canadian gay activist, publisher and writer. Wilson spent most of his life fighting for human rights issues, activism and AIDS organizations. He was the first openly gay candidate to be nominated by a major political party to stand for Parliament.

== Early life and education ==
Wilson was born near Meadow Lake, Saskatchewan on October 11, 1950. He received a bachelor's degree in education from the University of Saskatchewan, later studying to receive a master's degree in educational foundations.

In 1975, he gained prominence in a fight for gay rights with the University of Saskatchewan, after the university's dean of the College of Education refused to allow Wilson into the school system to supervise practice teachers because of his public involvement with the gay liberation movement. Wilson was vice-president of the Gay Community Centre Saskatoon and had been trying to start a gay academic union at the university. The Saskatchewan Human Rights Commission failed to protect Wilson and his case was unsuccessful.

== Career ==
Wilson briefly taught in Makwa, Saskatchewan.

Wilson spent most of his life fighting for human rights issues, activism and AIDS organizations. In 1977, he founded Stubblejumper Press, a small publishing house dedicated to works by Canadian lesbians and gay men. The company's first title was Wilson's own poetry collection The Myth of the Boy. From 1978 to 1983, Wilson served as executive director of the Saskatchewan Association on Human Rights. In 1983, he moved to Toronto to work for the Toronto Board of Education as an advisor to the Race Relations and Equal Opportunity Office. In 1984, he became one of the founding publishers of Rites: for lesbian and gay liberation.

Wilson was one of the first openly gay candidates to be nominated by a major political party to stand for Parliament, as a candidate of the New Democratic Party in the Toronto riding of Rosedale in the 1988 election. During the campaign, he was diagnosed with HIV. He spent the rest of his life as an AIDS activist, helping to found AIDS Action Now! and founding chairperson of the Canadian Network of Organizations for People Living With AIDS.

Wilson published his partner Peter McGehee's novels, Boys Like Us (1991) and Sweetheart (1992). One month before his death, he completed McGehee's notes of his third novel, Labour of Love (1993).

== Personal life ==
Wilson met American dramatist Peter McGehee (1955 – 1991), his life partner, in 1979, and the couple moved to Toronto in 1983. Wilson tested positive for HIV in 1988. He died in Toronto on September 26, 1992.

== Legacy ==
In 1995 the University of Saskatchewan's gay organization (Gays and Lesbians at the U of S, GLUS) established the Doug Wilson Award, given annually to honour those individuals who have shown leadership and courage in advancing the rights of gays & lesbians at the University of Saskatchewan. The University of Saskatchewan Students' Union (USSU) has presented the award since 2001, after GLUS folded following the establishment of the USSU-run Pride Centre.

Stubblejumper, a film about Doug Wilson, was screened in venues across Saskatchewan in March 2009. It was directed by Saskatchewan filmmaker David Geiss.

In honour of his role as a significant builder of LGBT culture and history in Canada, a portrait of Wilson by artist Alfred Ng is held in The ArQuives: Canada's LGBTQ2+ Archives' National Portrait Collection.
