= Shawn Syms =

Canadian writer and activist

Shawn Syms (born 1970) is a Canadian writer and activist on LGBT issues and other aspects of progressive politics based in Toronto, Ontario.

From 1988 until 1992, he was one of the editors and publishers of Rites, a Canadian monthly magazine of queer history, politics and culture. Syms's work for Rites included political and cultural analysis that was referenced in such books as The Lesbian and Gay Studies Reader and Global Sports Sponsorship, and reprinted in the respected left-of-centre LGBT weekly Gay Community News. During that time, Syms was also active in the political organization AIDS Action NOW!, which fought for access to treatment for people living with HIV/AIDS.

In 1997 and 1998, he was publisher, for Pink Triangle Press, of Canadian Male, a short-lived gay men's sexual magazine characterized by very diverse contents and high production values. Syms co-wrote the sexual-advice column "Carnal Queeries" in Toronto's Xtra! for several years. Syms was a copy editor at Fuse Magazine for over a decade and served on its board of directors for 13 years in the 1990s and early 2000s. He blogged on political affairs for This Magazine from 2007 to 2008. From 2007 to 2010, he wrote a regular column on sexuality, sex work, drug use and harm reduction for xtra.ca called "Free Agent."

As a journalist, Syms has specialized in covering medical conditions transmitted through drug use and sexual practices, including hepatitis, herpes, HPV and HIV/AIDS. His 2009 extensive examination of the legal and biocultural implications of criminalizing HIV transmission was described by criminalization expert Edwin J. Bernard as a "piece de resistance" and was one of the few pieces by a non-lawyer included by the Canadian HIV/AIDS Legal Network's resource kit for lawyers involved in cases related to HIV and the criminal law. In 2008, Syms was an invited speaker on the topic at the Health and Human Rights Conference at Queen's University.

Other advocacy journalism by Syms regarding gay transgender men has been lauded by writer and sex-worker advocate Sasha Von Bon Bon, and translated into French. His coverage of the forced sterilization of a Chilean HIV-positive woman has been cited in the Harvard Human Rights Journal.

Syms's fiction writing was nominated for the 2009 Journey Prize, and was twice short-listed for the short-fiction competition associated with the Saints and Sinners Literary Festival. His essays have twice been published in books by Arsenal Pulp Press. Also a widely published book critic, his writing has appeared in thirty periodicals and journals.

In 2013, he edited and published Friend. Follow. Text., an anthology of short stories about interactions through social media.

His debut short story collection, Nothing Looks Familiar, was published by Arsenal Pulp in September 2014.
