= Alice Klein =

Alice Klein is the co-founder and former owner of Toronto's longest-running free alternative newsweekly, NOW Magazine. In 1981, Klein co-founded NOW with Michael Hollett and several others. It is now one of the largest independent media organizations in Canada.

Klein is also on the Board of the Toronto Arts Council, Canadian Journalists for Free Expression, Centre for Social Innovation and is a founding Green Enterprise Toronto (GET) member.

== Biography ==
Alice Klein attended York University, where she became involved with the university newspaper, Excalibur, during the mid-1970s. During this period, Klein was active in left-wing politics and a member of the Socialist League. During her years at York, Klein met her future husband, Michael Hollett.

In 2007, Klein wrote, directed, and produced her first documentary feature film The Call of the Hummingbird about a group of more than 1000 Mayan calendar (13 moon calendar) followers, bio-regionalists, and permaculture experts who gather in central Brazil to prepare and train for 21 December 2012 – the end of the Mayan calendar. The film was screened at SXSW, Hot Docs and numerous other international film festivals.

In 2016, Klein became the sole proprietor of the newspaper after Hollett sold his share of Now Communications to Klein and left the newspaper to focus on North by Northeast as the festival's president and founder.

In 2019, Klein's NOW Communications sold NOW to Media Central Corporation for $2 million. Klein remained with the newspaper as "Chief Editorial Strategist."
