= Pathfinder Mural =

The Pathfinder Mural is a work of art formerly located at 410 West Street in the New York City neighborhood known as the West Village. It was conceived of by artist Mike Alewitz in 1988 and painted as a collaboration among eighty artists from twenty nations, who painted it on the side of the Socialist Workers Party (SWP) building housing the Pathfinder Press, the publishing arm of the Pathfinder tendency, a left-wing organization.

== Subject ==
The mural consisted of a red-colored printing press in the center, out of which seemed to flow posters of revolutionary heroes, with crowds of people depicted above and below the press. Well-known activists and political figures included Martin Luther King Jr., Sojourner Truth, Malcolm X, Fidel Castro, Stephen Biko, and Harriet Tubman. The press itself is printing Fidel Castro's words, "The truth must not be only the truth--it must also be told."

== History ==
The SWP commissioned the mural at the suggestion of Alewitz, a long-time member of the party.

Participants in the project included artists such as Armand Vaillancourt, Dumile Feni and Carlos Montenegro. There were also other, anonymous contributors with revolutionary and/or working-class backgrounds.

In an interview with the New York Times dated September 7, 1997, Alewitz said of the mural, "I wanted to do this one because Pathfinder represents the tradition of publishing important revolutionary ideas. I'm critical of the New York art scene. I find that much of the art taught in the schools and produced through the gallery system reflects the values of the cynical and confused middle class. Basically, a stronger art is produced in those societies--like Cuba and Nicaragua--where there's a pulling together, an optimism about going forward."

Political conflicts, however, beset the project. From the right, Patrick Buchanan attacked it in the Washington Times as "a six-story shrine to communism, a Marxist Mount Rushmore in Greenwich Village." More disruptive to the project were criticisms from the SWP itself who criticized Alewitz' vision of a work that would depict revolutionary heroes as human beings and insisted on an homage to the party's heroes and attempted to micromanage the project by issuing directives on matters such as how large Leon Trotsky's head should be.

A quotation from Eugene Debs' famous anti-war speech made in Canton, Ohio, were replaced with words from Fidel Castro. Also removed were personal touches by Alewitz such as depictions of two students killed by the National Guard at Kent State University in 1970, one of whom had been a close friend of Alewitz's.

Alewitz was expelled from the SWP prior to the project's conclusion and was excluded from its opening ceremony.

In 1996, the mural was permanently removed in order to repair cracks in the exterior wall of the Pathfinder building. The SWP subsequently sold the building for $20 million.

== See also ==
- Pathfinder Press
- Socialist Workers Party (United States)
- Mike Alewitz

== Sources ==
- Insurgent Images: The Agitprop Murals of Mike Alewitz (introduction)
- "Insurgent Images: the Agitprop Murals of Mike Alewitz"
