= Mike Alewitz =

American muralist and labor activist

- Born: January 14, 1951 (age 75); Cleveland, Ohio, U.S.
- Other name: Meyer Alewitz
- Education: Cleveland Heights High School; Kent State University
- Occupations: Educator, Artist, Muralist, Political Activist
- Organization(s): Young Socialist Alliance; Socialist Workers Party
- Known for: Eyewitness to the Kent State shooting
- Political party: Socialist Workers Party
- Movement: Anti-war movement Labor movement Socialist movement
- Awards: Millennium Artist (1999)

Meyer “Mike” Alewitz is an American educator, agitprop artist, mural painter, and socialist political activist. His use of art to lobby for workers’ rights has fostered numerous controversies.

== Early life and education ==
Alewitz was born January 14, 1951, in Cleveland, Ohio, to parents who were active in unions and progressive causes. At the age of four, the family moved to Wilmington, Delaware. Alewitz grew up in a segregated post-World War II housing development surrounded by working-class Irish and Italian families. He moved back to Cleveland as a teenager, and attended Cleveland Heights High School in Cleveland Heights, Ohio, where he graduated in 1968.

He enrolled at Kent State University, where he was as a founder and chairman of the Kent Student Mobilization Committee Against the War in Vietnam (SMC). He was also a columnist for the Daily Kent Stater and was the socialist candidate for student body president at the time of the Kent State shootings in 1970.

=== Kent State shootings ===
On April 30, 1970, U.S. President Richard Nixon, after having recently pledged to withdraw 150,000 American troops from the Vietnam War, Nixon announced the expansion of American war efforts into Cambodia. At Kent State, as occurred on many college campuses across the country, Nixon’s announcement inspired passionate student protest and clashes with authorities. Ohio Governor James Rhodes sent National Guardsmen to occupy the Kent State campus and restore order, but on May 4, during a student-run anti-war rally, several of the guardsmen fired on protesting students, killing four and wounding nine others.

Alewitz was an eyewitness to the shootings, with some of his close friends counted among the victims. In the immediate wake of the tragedy, Alewitz fled campus to avoid arrest but was soon detained by a group of “vigilantes” who pursued the Kent State protestors. Police arrived and arrested Alewitz, who was then barred from returning to the university.

After leaving Kent State, Alewitz became a leader of the national student strike that followed the shootings and traveled to Washington, D.C., to address a crowd of over 100,000 people at a mass anti-war demonstration on May 9, 1970. Alewitz later served as National Chairman of the Committee of Kent State Massacre Eyewitnesses and was subpoenaed to testify before the Presidential Commission on Campus Unrest, known as the Scranton Commission, where he spoke extensively about the shootings.

== Career ==
=== Anti-war activity ===
Following the tragedy at Kent State, Alewitz moved to Austin, Texas, where he became a leader of the Austin Student Mobilization Committee and the Texas statewide anti-war coalition. His involvement in student outreach to active-duty GIs there led to him being barred from local military bases and placed on the Attorney General’s list of “subversives.”

=== Labor and socialist activist ===
Alewitz joined the Young Socialist Alliance in 1968 and the Socialist Workers Party in 1970. He was active with the group in Texas, Los Angeles, Cleveland, New Orleans, Virginia, Boston and Newark, New Jersey. He served as a member of the SWP until his expulsion in 1987, but remained active in the socialist, anti-war, and labor movements.

During his professional career, Alewitz worked at a variety of jobs, including as a track laborer, railroad clerk, production machinist, and sign painter. His various occupations included membership in such organizations as the Brotherhood of Railroad Clerks, the Brotherhood of Maintenance of Way, International Union of Electrical Workers, Brotherhood of Painters and Allied Trades, United Scenic Artists, and the American Association of University Professors.

=== Artist and muralist ===
Alewitz has traveled throughout the world creating public art on themes of peace and justice. Some of his earlier works included a mural at the Massachusetts College of Art depicting murdered teen Elijah Pate, the seven-story “Pathfinder Mural” in Greenwich Village, and a mural promoting international worker solidarity at the Southern California Library for Social Studies and Research.

In 1999, Alewitz was named a Millennium Artist by the White House Millennium Council, the National Endowment for the Arts, and the Mid-Atlantic Arts Foundation. As a result, he was chosen to execute a series of murals painted in Maryland about Harriet Tubman and the Underground Railroad. The central mural, which depicted Tubman carrying a musket, was ultimately rejected by the Associated Black Charities (for whom it was intended) for its controversial association with gun violence.

His art has been the subject of documentary films, including 2005’s Breaking Walls, which followed Alewitz on a trip to the Middle East and examined the ways in which his murals have shaped conversations about the role of art in society.
