= Stubblejumper Press =

Canadian book publishing company

- Industry: Publishing
- Founded: 1977; 48 years ago in Saskatchewan
- Founder: Douglas Wilson
- Fate: Ceased operations sometime before 1992

Stubblejumper Press was a Canadian book publishing company, active in the 1970s and 1980s. Founded by Douglas Wilson in 1977 and originally based in Saskatchewan, the company was devoted to publishing works of LGBT literature.

Early works published by the company included Wilson's own poetry collection The Myth of the Boy in 1977 and Jordan Rand's The Year of the Horse in 1978. The company's original incarnation folded by 1980, but after moving to Toronto in the early 1980s Wilson relaunched Stubblejumper in 1985. Noted works published by Stubblejumper in the Toronto era included the novels of Wilson's partner Peter McGehee, poetry and non-fiction works by Ian Young and the annual Gay Canada series of travel guides.

The company ceased operations sometime before Wilson's death of AIDS in 1992. Stubblejumper was also later the title of a 2008 docudrama film about Wilson by director David Geiss.
