= Jack MacDonald (communist) =

Canadian communist leader (1888–1941)

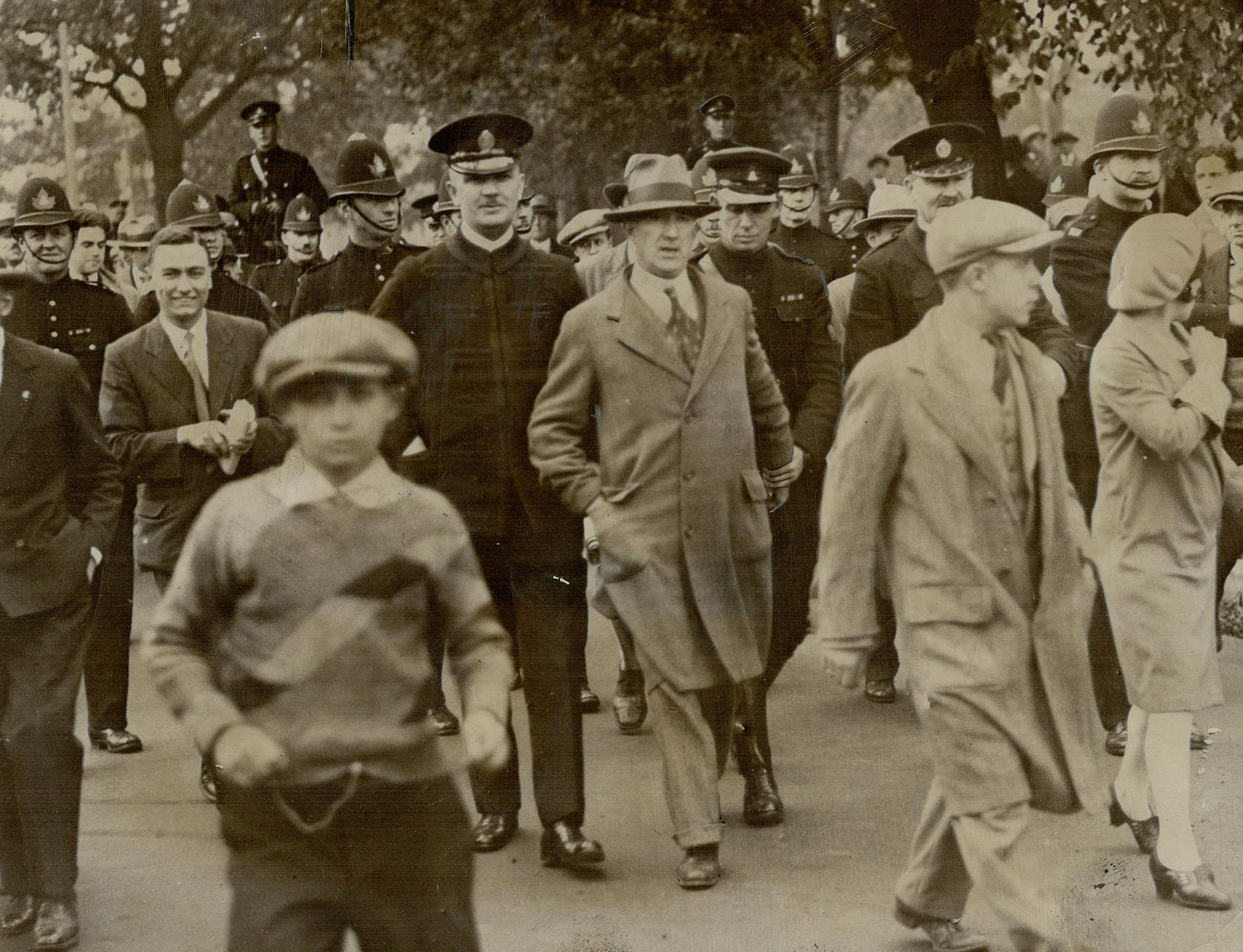
MacDonald is escorted away by police after a failed attempt to hold a free speech rally in Queen's Park, Toronto.

Jack MacDonald (nicknamed "Moscow Jack"; born 2 February 1888, in Falkirk, Scotland - 7 November 1941) was a founding member of the Communist Party of Canada and one of its leaders. He was party Chairman from 1921 to 1923, and National Secretary from 1923 to 1929.

MacDonald received a scholarship to attend high school, but economic necessity forced him into pattern making, the same occupation as his father. His imagination was "fired by the revolutionary events of 1905 in Russia," and would become involved, and later president (1910–1912) of the Falkirk Pattern Makers Association, a member of the British Socialist Party, and a member of the Scottish Social Democratic Federation. He immigrated to Toronto in 1912, where he became involved with the local left.

MacDonald supported the expulsion of Maurice Spector for Trotskyism in 1928. Subsequently, he tried to play a balancing role between the Tim Buck's Stalinist faction and the party majority headed by Finnish, Ukrainian and Jewish groups of which J.B. Salsberg was a notable figure. Macdonald failed and was expelled from the party in 1931 being accused of being a Lovestoneite (that is a supporter of Nikolai Bukharin's Right Opposition). MacDonald, however, maintained that he was attempting to play an independent role. Accusations of "Lovestoneism" are further undermined by the fact that MacDonald went on to reconcile with Spector and joined the Toronto branch of the International Left Opposition (Trotskyist) Canada in 1932.

MacDonald and Spector sided with Martin Abern and Max Shachtman in a dispute within the Communist League of America that threatened to split the Trotskyist movement in North America in the early 1930s. The split emerged in the late 1930s, this time over the question of the class nature of the Soviet Union with MacDonald siding with Shachtman in his split from the International in 1940. Macdonald died of a sudden heart attack on 7 November 1941 as he was recovering from an earlier, unspecified operation. His short obituary was published in the short-lived Trotskyist paper Labor Challenge in 1941.
