= Communist League (Iceland) =

The Icelandic Communist League was a grouping affiliated with the Socialist Workers Party (USA), a part of its international network of affiliates, the so-called Pathfinder Tendency. The Icelandic Communist League was unique in this tendency in that, while like its sister parties it too was very small, it was for a few years the only, and hence dominant, communist grouping in its country.

Its origins lie in the Icelandic Young Socialists. Some members formed the Organizing Committee for a Communist League in 2001, and in 2002 declared the "Communist League".

The Communist League has not been active in Iceland since 2006 or 2007.
