= Now (newspaper) =

Canadian newspaper in Ontario

NOW
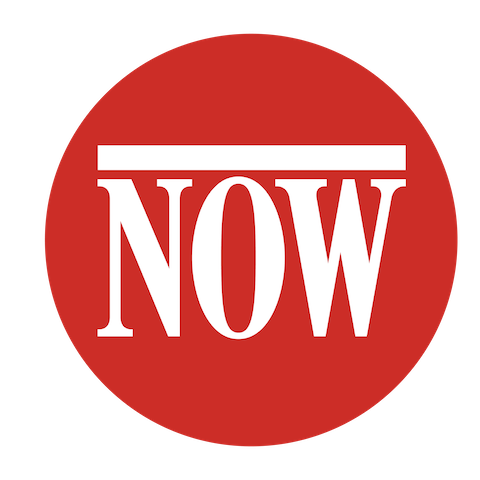
- Editor: Kerrisa Wilson
- Former editors: Michael Hollett (1981–2016); Kevin Ritchie (2016-2021); Radheyan Simonpillai (2021-2022)
- Staff writers: Veracia Ankrah; Camilla Bains; Osobe Waberi
- Categories: Alternative weekly newspaper (1981-2022); Online news publication (1993-present)
- Frequency: Weekly
- Publisher: Michael Hollett (1981–2016); Alice Klein (2016–2019); Brian Kalish (2019–2020); Brandon Gonez (2023–present)
- Total circulation: print: 510,000 (weekly avg, November 2019)
- First issue: 1981
- Company: Gonez Media
- Country: Canada
- Language: English
- Website: nowtoronto.com
- ISSN: 0712-1326

Now (styled as NOW), also known as NOW Magazine, is an online publication based in Toronto, Ontario, Canada. Through most of its existence, Now was a free alternative weekly newspaper. Physical publication of Now was suspended in August 2022, amid the bankruptcy of its former owner Media Central Corporation, although some new content was still published to its website. In January 2023, it was announced that the publication will be acquired by journalist Brandon Gonez.

== Publication history ==
Now was first published on September 10, 1981, by Michael Hollett and Alice Klein. NOW is an alternative weekly that covers news, culture, arts, and entertainment. In its printed incarnation, NOW was published 52 times a year and could be picked up in Toronto subway stations, cafes, variety stores, clothing outlets, restaurants, alternative movie venues, and in its green and red newspaper boxes. NOW was published every Thursday for a period of over 40 years, from 1981 to 2022. In March 2022, NOW Magazine switched to monthly publication in an effort to save money. By August, the printed magazine was abandoned entirely.

NOW has been online since 1993, first as now.com and then as nowtoronto.com since 2000.

It is also a central sponsor and its owners held an ownership stake in North by Northeast, a major annual music festival in Toronto.

NOW was privately owned by Hollett and Klein until 2016, when Hollett sold his share of the company to Klein and left the newspaper to focus on North by Northeast as the festival's president and founder. Hollett became sole owner of NXNE when he sold his shares in NOW. Hollett started a new national music and arts print publication, NEXT Magazine, in 2020, publishing in Toronto, Vancouver and Calgary,

In 2019, Klein's NOW Communications sold NOW to Media Central Corporation for $2 million. Klein remained with the newspaper as "Chief Editorial Strategist". A few weeks later, Media Central Corporation also announced a deal to acquire the similar Vancouver publication The Georgia Straight.

In April 2022, Media Central Corp Inc., of which NOW Central Communications Inc. is a subsidiary of, that owns and publishes NOW Magazine, filed for bankruptcy. Soon afterward, several of its longtime staff members left, notably film critic Norman Wilner leaving to take a job as a programmer for the Toronto International Film Festival.

In August, film critic and acting editor Radheyan Simonpillai stated on Twitter that the August 18 issue would be the publication's "last masthead"; in an interview on CBC's Metro Morning the following day, he clarified that the publication was not necessarily going out of business entirely, but would not be releasing print issues for the foreseeable future and many of its remaining staff were owed weeks of back pay.

Following the 2023 acquisition by Gonez, it relaunched as a digital publication, including short-form video and social networking, seeing a 65 per cent increase in website readership in 2025. In 2026, Gonez announced plans to launch a local edition in Vancouver, as well as the national website Now Canada.

== Content ==
Syndicated content in NOW included Dan Savage's "Savage Love" sex advice column, Matt Groening's Life in Hell comic and Rob Brezsny's "Real Astrology". Notable writers and editors have included Matt Galloway, Naomi Klein, Cameron Bailey, Kim Hughes, Susan G. Cole, Jon Kaplan, Adria Vasil, Glenn Sumi, Norman Wilner, Radheyan Simonpillai, Kevin Hegge, John Sewell and David Suzuki.

NOW published several comprehensive guide issues every year. Some of these include:

- Love Your Body
- The Best of Toronto Guide
- The Binge Issue
- The Hot Docs Film Festival Guide
- The Hot Summer Guide
- The Love & Sex Guide
- The NYE Planner
- The Patio Guide
- The Restaurant Guide
- The TIFF Issue
- The Toronto Pride Guide
- The Year In Review

In September 2021, Media Central Corporation announced that the company would be selling nine NFTs made from previous covers published by NOW Magazine and Georgia Straight. The NFTs are still listed as open for bidding.

In March 2022, NOW Magazine cut back on printing weekly issues in an effort to save money and grow its online audience. In August, the printed magazine was abandoned entirely.

== Green efforts ==
Some of these efforts include the construction of the Green Roof in 2006. The roof helps to keep the building temperature regulated while using less energy which aids in keeping pollution low. The plant life, which is a sedum species, helps to purify the air. The green roof also reduces stormwater runoff – which can cause sewage backup during periods of deluge. NOW implements a 100% recycled paper policy and uses only vegetable-based dyes for print. This effort, each year, saves over 28,000 living trees, reduces greenhouse gases – the equivalent given off by 534 cars, eliminates 7 swimming pools of waste water and saves 79 garbage trucks worth of solid waste. Now also partners with Green Enterprise Toronto (GET) and Canopy (formerly Markets Initiative). Both companies are dedicated to responsible business and green initiatives.

NOW is a certified B Corporation.

== See also ==
- List of newspapers in Canada
- Media of Canada
