= Canadian Forward =

The Canadian Forward was the official party organ of the Social Democratic Party of Canada between 1916 and 1918. It was one of the leading papers of the socialist movement, providing acerbic commentary on the war effort of the First World War, especially conscription. It was edited by Isaac Bainbridge and published at 363 Spadina Avenue in Toronto, Ontario.

Its historical significance lies in its repression. Bainbridge raised the ire of the Chief Press Censor, Lieutenant Colonel Chambers, who called for its outlawing. After Bainbridge was successfully convicted several times for seditious libel, Chambers eventually had the paper outlawed. However, the paper could not be outlawed until after the December 1917 election, due to political considerations.

The simple possession of the Canadian Forward became illegal following its outlawing in 1918. On 20 December 1918, three Stratford men were convicted of the simple possession of the paper – an item that had been wholly legal prior to the edict of 5 October 1918 – and one man, Arthur Skidmore, was sentenced to 30 days in jail.

== See also ==
- Conscription Crisis of 1917
- Social democracy
