= Gauche Socialiste =

- Founded: September 11, 1983
- Ideology: Marxism; Trotskyism; Revolutionary socialism; Anti-capitalism; Left-wing nationalism
- Political position: Far-left
- International affiliation: Fourth International (USec)

Website
- www.lagauche.ca

Gauche Socialiste (French pronunciation: [ɡoʃ sɔsjalist]) is an officially recognised faction within the political party Québec solidaire and an affiliate of the reunified Fourth International.

== Origins ==
It was formed in 1983 by Trotskyists who left or were expelled from the Revolutionary Workers League/Ligue Ouvrière Révolutionnaire when the group turned away from Trotskyism in the early 1980s. Gauche Socialiste members had previously been in the Organisation Combat Socialiste, which existed from 1980 to 1982, and were briefly part of the Mouvement socialiste, which was founded in 1981. Gauche Socialiste is the Quebec section of the reunified Fourth International. The group publishes the periodical La Gauche. The group's counterpart in English Canada was Socialist Challenge which later joined the New Socialist Group and formed a Fourth International Caucus within it.

In 2002, Gauche Socialiste participated in the creation of the Union des forces progressistes (UFP) and subsequently in 2006 supported the creation of Québec solidaire through the merger of the UFP and Option citoyenne. In 2007, GS was one of two groups to receive party recognition as a collective (faction).
