= John Riddell (Marxist) =

Executive Secretary of the Young Socialists/Ligue des Jeunes Socialistes
- In office 1965–?

Executive Secretary of the League for Socialist Action
- In office 1972–1977
- Preceded by: Ross Dowson
- Succeeded by: Post abolished

Executive Secretary of the Revolutionary Workers League
- In office 1977–1978
- Succeeded by: Steve Penner

Personal details
- Born: 1942 (age 83–84)
- Party: League for Socialist Action (1961-1977); Revolutionary Workers League (1977-1983); Socialist Workers Party (US) (1983-1994); Communist League (1994-2004)
- Other political affiliations: Co-operative Commonwealth Federation, New Democratic Party
- Parent(s): Robert Gerald Riddell; Kay Riddell Rouillard

John Riddell (born 1942) is a Canadian Marxist essayist, historian, editor, translator and activist. He is best known as editor of The Communist International in Lenin’s Time, an eight-volume series of books of Communist International documents, many of which were translated into English for the first time.

== Biography ==
Riddell's father, Robert Gerald Riddell, was a Canadian diplomat and Canadian Ambassador to the United Nations from 1950 until his death from a heart attack the next year. His mother, Kay Riddell Rouillard, founded the International Student Centre at the University of Toronto. As a high school student at University of Toronto Schools, Riddell helped plan and carry out a protest at the Liberal Party's rally at Maple Leaf Gardens on June 8, 1957, which Progressive Conservative Party organizer Allister Grosart termed “the turning point” in the 1957 Canadian federal election campaign.

In 1960, Riddell joined the Socialist Education League, a Trotskyist organization led by Ross Dowson and helped found a youth affiliate, the Young Socialists in Toronto. In 1961, he was a founding member of the SEL's successor, the League for Socialist Action. In 1965, when the YS had its first national convention, Riddell was elected the group's first national executive secretary. He was the LSA's Toronto organizer from 1967 and its candidate for Mayor of Toronto in the 1969 municipal election. Riddell served as executive secretary of the LSA from 1972 until 1977 when it merged with other Trotskyist groups to form the Revolutionary Workers League/Ligue Ouvrière Révolutionnaire.

In 1972, Riddell “was the target of an extensive campaign of [anonymous] letters containing various attempts to discredit him.” In 1979, Royal Canadian Mounted Police officers testified to an Ontario Public Inquiry that they had written and distributed these attacks, based on false information. Riddell then took part in legal initiatives by Harry Kopyto and Ross Dowson to secure redress in “a series of high-profile, but unsuccessful, lawsuits against the Royal Canadian Mounted Police” with reverberations lasting until 2016.

In 1983, Riddell began work with the Socialist Workers Party and Pathfinder Press on the Communist International publishing project, relocating to New York City in the mid-1980s.

He returned to Toronto in 1994, and was active with the RWL's successor, the Communist League until 2004 when he broke with the CL and the SWP over their lack of support for demonstrations against the 2003 invasion of Iraq. Subsequently, Riddell has been active in solidarity campaigns for Venezuela, Bolivia, and Palestine and for climate justice.

== Works ==
- (ed. with Art Young) Prospects for a socialist Canada. Toronto: Vanguard Publications, 1977.
- (ed.) Lenin's struggle for a revolutionary International: documents, 1907-1916, the preparatory years. Monad Press, 1984.
- (ed.) The German revolution and the debate on Soviet power: documents, 1918-1919: preparing the founding congress. Pathfinder Press, 1986.
- (ed.) Founding the Communist International: proceedings and documents of the First Congress, March 1919. Pathfinder Press, 1987.
- (ed.) Workers of the world and oppressed peoples, unite! : proceedings and documents of the Second Congress, 1920. Pathfinder Press, 1991.
- (ed.) To see the dawn: Baku, 1920--First Congress of the Peoples of the East. Pathfinder Press, 1993.
- (trans. and ed.) Toward the united front: proceedings of the Fourth Congress of the Communist International, 1922. Brill, 2012. Historical materialism book series, 34.
- (trans. and ed.) To the masses: proceedings of the Third Congress of the Communist International, 1921. Brill, 2015. Historical materialism book series, 91.
- (ed. with Mike Taber) Fighting Fascism : how to struggle and how to win by Clara Zetkin. Haymarket Books, 2017.
- (tr.) The communist movement at a crossroads : plenums of the Communist International's Executive Committee, 1922-1923. Ed. by Michael Taber. Brill, 2018. Historical materialism book series, 160.
