= Revolutionary Marxist Group (Canada) =

Defunct Trotskyist organization in Canada

- Abbreviation: RMG
- Successor: Revolutionary Workers League
- Formation: 1973
- Dissolved: 1977
- Type: Political organization
- Purpose: Trotskyism; revolutionary socialism
- Region served: English-speaking Canada
- Publication: The Old Mole
- Affiliations: Fourth International sympathizing group

The Revolutionary Marxist Group (RMG) was a Trotskyist political organization in English-speaking Canada in the 1970s. It was formed in 1973 and dissolved in 1977 when it fused with the League for Socialist Action/Ligue Socialiste Ouvrière, the Quebec-based Groupe Marxiste Révolutionnaire and the Young Socialists/Ligue des Jeunes Socialistes to form the Revolutionary Workers League/Ligue Ouvrière Révolutionnaire.

== Origins ==
The RMG emerged from the Canadian New Left and from debates following the decline of the Waffle, a left-wing current in and around the New Democratic Party. Historian David Blocker writes that Bret Smiley and Barry Weisleder joined with "Old Mole" student activists at the University of Toronto to form the Revolutionary Marxist Group. A document collection hosted by the Socialist History Project similarly describes the RMG as combining the Old Mole group with activists from the Waffle left.

The McMaster University Library finding aid for the Revolutionary Marxist Group fonds dates the records of the organization mainly to 1973–1978 and lists national office, branch, internal bulletin, press, convention and political committee files.

== Politics and publications ==
The RMG published The Old Mole. An archived 1974 issue identifies the newspaper as the paper of the Revolutionary Marxist Group and describes the RMG as a sympathizing organization of the Fourth International. McMaster's RMG fonds includes files for The Old Mole, RMG bulletins, internal discussion bulletins and press materials.

John Riddell, a former member of the Canadian Trotskyist movement who belonged to the League for Socialist Action, describes the RMG as a sympathizing group of the Fourth International in English Canada. He writes that the RMG, the Quebec-based Groupe Marxiste Révolutionnaire and the League for Socialist Action/Ligue Socialiste Ouvrière had been separated by a 1972–73 factional dispute in the world Trotskyist movement but moved toward fusion as that dispute began to resolve in the mid-1970s.

== Activism and elections ==
The RMG was involved in feminist and gay-liberation activism in Toronto. In an oral history of International Women's Day in Toronto, published by rabble.ca, Carolyn Egan recalled that Varda Burstyn, a member of the RMG, helped bring together women from different organizations in 1977 to discuss organizing a broad women's movement action. A note to the article identifies the RMG and the League for Socialist Action as the Trotskyist groups involved in those debates and states that the RMG formed in 1973 and disbanded in 1977.

The group also engaged in electoral activity. A 1977 RMG press release, reproduced by York University's Left History project, announced support for a candidate in the 1977 Ontario general election and emphasized gay-rights issues.

== Electoral activity ==
Although the RMG was not a registered political party, it fielded candidates in some elections. A 1977 press release by the RMG Election Campaign Committee, reproduced in York University's Left History online materials, announced that an RMG candidate in the 1977 Ontario general election supported a demonstration for gay rights. The bibliography for Left History's "Workers of the World Caress" project also lists the document as an RMG Election Campaign Committee press release from May 18, 1977.

== Fusion into the Revolutionary Workers League ==
In 1977, the RMG fused with the League for Socialist Action/Ligue Socialiste Ouvrière, the Groupe Marxiste Révolutionnaire and the Young Socialists/Ligue des Jeunes Socialistes to form the Revolutionary Workers League/Ligue Ouvrière Révolutionnaire. Riddell describes the fusion as bringing together four organizations associated with the Fourth International and says the combined forces included close to 500 members and supporters. The RMG fonds at McMaster includes Revolutionary Workers League materials from 1977, reflecting the transition into the new organization.

== Associated activists ==
Activists later publicly associated with the RMG included Judy Rebick, Gary Kinsman, Varda Burstyn, Bret Smiley and Barry Weisleder. The Canadian Encyclopedia states that Rebick worked with the RMG and later the Revolutionary Workers League. A 2025 review in Against the Current states that Kinsman was a member of the Young Socialists and the RMG before the RMG merged into the Revolutionary Workers League. Weisleder has described himself as a founding member of the RMG in a published interview.
