= Peter McGehee =

American dramatist

- Born: Peter Gregory McGehee; October 6, 1955; Pine Bluff, Arkansas
- Died: September 13, 1991 (aged 35); Toronto, Ontario
- Occupations: Novelist, short story writer
- Partner: Douglas Wilson
- Writing career
- Period: 1970s–1990s
- Notable works: Boys Like Us, Sweetheart

Peter Gregory McGehee (October 6, 1955 – September 13, 1991) was an American-born Canadian novelist, dramatist and short story writer.

Born in Pine Bluff, Arkansas to Frank Thomas and Julia Ann May McGehee, Peter moved with his family to Little Rock when he was six. He was the second of three children. McGehee played the trombone at Parkview High School in Little Rock where he graduated in 1973. McGehee studied at Southern Methodist University in Dallas before moving to San Francisco to work in theatre. While living in San Francisco, he wrote his first play and first comedic musical revue The Quinlan Sisters, and later met Canadian activist Douglas Wilson, who became his partner. He moved to Saskatoon in 1980 to be with Wilson, and subsequently the couple moved to Toronto in 1982. However, due to the lack of recognition afforded to same-sex marriage at the time, he often faced potential deportation because of his citizenship status, twice entering marriages of convenience with female friends. He briefly moved to New York City in 1984, but had returned to Toronto by 1986.

He published his first novella, Beyond Happiness, with Stubblejumper Press in 1985, and premiered his second revue, The Fabulous Sirs, in 1987.

In 1988, McGehee and Wilson were both diagnosed HIV-positive. McGehee subsequently wrote two novels, Boys Like Us and Sweetheart, and a book of short stories, The IQ Zoo. Boys Like Us was published in 1991, shortly before McGehee's death of AIDS-related causes; Sweetheart and The IQ Zoo were both published posthumously. The novels focused on the life of Zero MacNoo, a character who much like McGehee himself was an American living in Toronto, and his family and circle of friends.

Using notes that McGehee had written in preparation for his third novel, Wilson subsequently wrote Labour of Love before his own death in 1992. That novel was published in 1993.

== Books ==
- Beyond Happiness (1985)
- Boys Like Us (1991)
- The IQ Zoo (1991)
- Sweetheart (1992)
