= Revolutionary Workers League (Canada) =

Canadian Trotskyist group

Revolutionary Workers League/Ligue Ouvrière Révolutionnaire
- Leader: John Riddell, Steve Penner
- Founded: 1977
- Dissolved: 1990
- Merger of: League for Socialist Action, Revolutionary Marxist Group, Groupe Marxiste Revolutionnaire
- Succeeded by: Communist League
- Newspaper: Socialist Voice, La Lutte Ouvrière
- Youth wing: Young Socialists
- Ideology: Trotskyism
- International affiliation: Fourth International (USFI)

The Revolutionary Workers League (French: Ligue Ouvrière Révolutionnaire) was a Canadian Trostkyist party formed on 8 August 1977 by the fusion of the Revolutionary Marxist Group and its Quebec counterpart, the Groupe Marxiste Revolutionnaire, with the League for Socialist Action. The organization marked the reunification of the Canadian section of the Fourth International and had a membership of several hundred people. The group published a monthly newspaper in English, Socialist Voice, as well as a French-language publication, La Lutte Ouvrière.

The RWL was heavily influenced by the Socialist Workers Party of the United States. When the SWP moved away from Trotskyism in the early 1980s, a faction fight broke out in the RWL between supporters of the SWP and supporters of a Trotskyist position over the issue of Leon Trotsky's theory of permanent revolution and the nature of the Cuban Revolution. While the Trotskyists argued that Cuba was a deformed workers' state, the supporters of the SWP argued that Cuban Revolution was a full workers' revolution and that the Cuban state was a genuine workers' state. The Trotskyists were expelled beginning in the early 1980s and formed what became Gauche Socialiste in Quebec and Socialist Challenge in English Canada. In 1990, the RWL left the Fourth International and changed its name to the Communist League.

== See also ==
- Revolutionary Workers League (in Manitoba)
