= Social Democratic Party of Canada =

- Abbreviation: SDPC
- Founded: 1911
- Split from: Socialist Party of Canada
- Newspaper: Cotton’s Weekly (1908-1915) Canadian Forward (1916-1918)
- Ideology: Social Democracy Socialism
- Political position: Left
- International affiliation: International Socialist Bureau

The Social Democratic Party was a social democratic political party in Canada founded in 1911 by members of the right wing of the Socialist Party of Canada, many of whom had left the organisation in May 1907 to form the Social Democratic Party of British Columbia. These members were dissatisfied with what they saw as that party's rigid, doctrinaire approach. As opposed to the Socialist Party of Canada, the SDP allowed minority language groups ample room for self-determination, which led to a perception that the ethnic groups were more dominant than the overarching SDP. When the authorities cracked down on ethnic groups during the 1918 wave of repression, many of the individual ethnic chapters were shut down.

The SDP was based in British Columbia, put forward a more moderate and evolutionary socialist position, and had a more positive view of the trade union movement than its rival. The party won seats in the Legislative Assembly of British Columbia in the early 20th century and also won seats in the Legislative Assembly of Manitoba in 1915 and 1920.

The SDP's official platform, as put forth in their newspaper Canadian Forward:

As a means of preparing the minds of the working class for the inauguration of the Co-operative commonwealth, the Social-Democratic Party of Canada will support any measure that will tend to better conditions under capitalism, such as:

(1) Reduction of hours of labor.
(2) The elimination of child labor.
(3) Universal adult suffrage without distinction of sex or regard to property qualifications.

(4) The Initiative, Referendum, and right of Recall.

It was perceived as being a radical leftist group by the federal government, especially during the World War I. The Canadian Director of Public Safety identified them as the publisher of the largest amount of anti-war propaganda during the war. Isaac Bainbridge, the editor of the Canadian Forward and Dominion Secretary of the SDP, was imprisoned on numerous occasions for the "seditious material."

Becky Buhay was among its active members.

In 1915, Richard Rigg, a founder of the SDP, was elected in Winnipeg. He sat for just two years as MLA, resigning in 1917 to run unsuccessfully for a federal seat.

In 1918, the SDP was briefly outlawed by an Order-in-Council of the Borden administration, but that was quickly rectified shortly thereafter. However, its newspaper Canadian Forward was outlawed permanently, which persecution helped to contribute to the party's downfall.

The SDP joined the Federated Labour Party of Canada in 1920 and its successors such as the Independent Labour Party.

Many former members of the SDP joined the Co-operative Commonwealth Federation when it was formed in 1932.

== See also ==
- social democracy
- List of political parties in Canada
- Social Democratic Party of Canada in Manitoba
- Labour candidates and parties (Canada))
