= The Crazy Nastyass Honey Badger =

2011 viral video

The Crazy Nastyass Honey Badger is a YouTube viral video and Internet meme that first appeared on the Internet in January 2011. The video features commentary by a narrator identified only as "Randall", dubbed over pre-existing National Geographic Wild footage of honey badgers. Accompanying the narration is the Prelude from J. S. Bach's Cello Suite No. 6 in D major, BWV 1012. Since its release, the video has gained more than 100 million views.

== Background ==
Randall stated he chose to redub the National Geographic footage because "this animal eats King Cobras, demolishes animals, and this narrator that is so boring, so I said, 'we need to spice this thing up.'" Randall also stated that he would be overjoyed if he had the honor of meeting a real honey badger. "If I met a real one, I would, probably like, let it bite my balls off if it wanted to," states Randall in a 2014 interview with Celebs Daily. Randall has also stated he first gained an interest in animals by way of his father, a cameraman for Mutual of Omaha's Wild Kingdom. While not much information has been officially released about the narrator, the New York Observer has claimed a press release for a potential television show based on the video reveals Randall as "Christopher Gordon." Gordon's Twitter account, however, lists him as Randall's assistant.

== Response ==
The video received much attention in early 2011, garnering over 105 million views since its release. References to the video have appeared in American Pickers, Hot in Cleveland, and Glee, with frozen yogurt chain Red Mango offering a flavor named "Honey Badger". The video has been listed as a favorite by Taylor Swift and Olivia Wilde. In 2012, Randall appeared on an episode of America's Got Talent, where he narrated over footage from the show.

== Spin offs ==
Honey Badger Don't Care
- Author: Randall; Christopher Gordon
- Language: English
- Genre: Humor
- Publisher: Andrews McMeel Publishing (Hardcover edition)
- Publication date: 2011
- Publication place: United States
- Media type: Print (Hardback)
- Pages: 72
- ISBN: 978-1-4494-1965-3

=== Honey Badger Don't Care ===
In January 2012, Andrews McMeel Publishing released a book featuring comedic commentaries about the honey badger and ten other animals. In addition to the honey badger, the book also includes chapters on the aye-aye, the Tasmanian devil, the emperor tamarin, the pink fairy armadillo, the tarsier, the opossum, the solenodon, the wombat, the American bullfrog, and the sloth. Reception to the book has been mixed to positive, with Audubon Magazine writing that the book was "memorable". Willamette Week called the book "amusing, but much of the humor of the video is lost without Randall's narration".

=== Mobile app ===
Collaborating with MEDL Mobile, Randall launched "The Honey Badger Don't Care" app in 2011 with an updated version relaunched in 2013. The app was made available on both the Google Play store as well as the Apple iTunes Store.

=== Internet video ===
In October 2020, The Lincoln Project released the online advertisement Covey Spreader, which features a voiceover by Randall. The ad is a parody of The Crazy Nastyass Honey Badger video and spotlights members of the Trump campaign who had been diagnosed with COVID-19 during the campaign.

=== Television ===
Randall has voiced several commercials for products such as pistachios and virtual phone systems. In 2012, Randall stated that he was developing a television show with Six Eleven Media entitled Honey Badger U. The show was planned be a mixture of live action and animation.
