= Harry Kopyto =

Canadian lawyer and broadcaster

- Born: 1946 (age 79–80); Ulm, Baden-Württemberg, American zone, Allied-occupied Germany
- Occupations: Lawyer, paralegal, political activist
- Political party: New Democratic Party (1961-present); Co-operative Commonwealth Federation (1959-1961)
- Other political affiliations: League for Socialist Action (until 1974), Socialist League/Forward Group (1974-1990s)

Hersch Harry Kopyto (born 1946) is a Canadian political activist and commentator who is best known for his legal career in which he often crusaded on behalf of underdogs and for his frequent conflicts with the legal establishment. Disbarred as a lawyer in 1989, he continued to practise as a paralegal until 2015 and worked as an unlicensed legal advocate and researcher until barred, in 2020, from conducting any legal work.

== Early life ==
Kopyto was born to a Polish Jewish family in a Displaced Persons' camp in Ulm, Allied-occupied Germany immediately following World War II. Most of his family, except for his parents and a brother, were killed in the Holocaust. His family moved to Israel in 1948 before emigrating to Canada in 1952.

== Political activity ==
Growing up in Toronto, Kopyto was a high-school radical, protesting against mandatory military cadet training as well as hikes in the price of milk. "I was always a trouble-maker. I’m hopeless," Kopyto told an interviewer when looking back upon his youth.

At university, Kopyto was an anti-war activist and joined the Young Socialists, and later the League for Socialist Action. He was also active in the New Democratic Party and its left-wing faction, The Waffle. He has been a member of the NDP and its predecessor, the Co-operative Commonwealth Federation, since 1959.

In 1987, Kopyto sought the NDP nomination in St. George—St. David which would have allowed him to run against Attorney-General Ian Scott in the 1987 provincial election but he lost the nomination to John Campey.

In the early 1990s, Kopyto was active in the Ontario NDP's Left Caucus which dissented from the government of Bob Rae for being too moderate. He authored an open letter co-signed by other party dissidents, including three NDP MPPs, opposing Rae's abandonment of left-wing policies such as public auto insurance. Rae responded by saying "Have you ever met Harry Kopyto? I don't think I've done anything in the last 15 years that Harry Kopyto has ever agreed with. Me and about 12 million other people. It's not news that Mr. Kopyto and his friends are critical. It's natural. What's surprising is that it's taken him 2½ years to complain about our government."

Kopyto was a member of the Alliance of Non-Zionist Jews in the 1970s and also represented the Canadian Arab Federation in a libel action against The Globe and Mail.

== Legal career ==
Kopyto studied law at Osgoode Hall Law School and was called to the Ontario bar. He represented clients in a number of human rights cases including the case of John Damien, a horse racing steward who had been fired by the Ontario Racing Commission in 1975 for being gay. He also fought cases that affect women’s rights, prisoners’ rights, the rights of the aged and the handicapped and unions’ rights.

He represented the Gay Alliance Toward Equality before the Supreme Court of Canada in its 1978 lawsuit against the Vancouver Sun for refusing to publish the group's advertisement.

He also initiated a series of actions that sought to establish the principle that a person is entitled to see the information on which a search warrant that affects them is based.

Following a split in the League for Socialist Action, Kopyto left with former LSA leader Ross Dowson and other supporters to form the Socialist League. He represented Dowson in a series of high-profile, but unsuccessful, lawsuits against the Royal Canadian Mounted Police in which the police force was accused of disrupting the LSA and defaming Dowson and another LSA leader, John Riddell. Kopyto also represented several former members of the League at the McDonald Commission inquiry into the RCMP at which they alleged long-term harassment of the League by the security force.

In 1986, Kopyto was charged with a contempt of court citation by Attorney-General Ian Scott for "scandalizing the court" by telling the press, following a judge's decision to dismiss Dowson's case, "This decision is a mockery of justice. It stinks to high hell. It says it is okay to break the law and you are immune so long as someone above you said to do it. Mr. Dowson and I have lost faith in the judicial system to render justice. We're wondering what is the point of appealing and continuing this charade of the courts in this country which are warped in favour of protecting the police. The courts and the RCMP are sticking so close together you'd think they were put together with Krazy Glue." Kopyto faced a fine and up to six months in jail if convicted.

The case became a cause célèbre with the Canadian Civil Liberties Association urging Scott to drop the charge and the Law Union of Ontario setting up a legal defence fund for Kopyto. 25 lawyers signed on as co-counsels to defend Kopyto in court against the charge.

Kopyto was convicted of the charge and was ordered to apologize or be barred from practising law in any court in the province until he does so. The Criminal Lawyers' Association intervened on Kopyto's behalf during his appeal. On November 27, 1987, the Ontario Court of Appeal acquitted Kopyto and found that the charge against him was unconstitutional.

In 1989, Kopyto was charged with professional misconduct by the Law Society of Upper Canada (now known as the Law Society of Ontario) for allegedly overbilling the province's legal aid plan by $150,000 over a three-year period.

Kopyto told the press that "I admitted to guessing at the exact amount of time spent on some accounts. On some accounts, I overbilled. On some accounts, I underbilled. In the end, I've averaged out to being underpaid. If I wanted to rip people off to make money, I wouldn't have taken a Legal Aid certificate. To say you can rip off Legal Aid is ridiculous."

He told the disciplinary committee "Any inaccuracies in the bills I submitted were not intentional and were minimal in nature, I was attempting to reconstruct events which I hadn't recorded properly." The three-person disciplinary committee recommended disbarring Kopyto. The Law Society's benchers voted to disbar the lawyer on November 7, 1989.

Among the findings of the tribunal hearing the case were that it was physically impossible for Kopyto to have billed the sums he did as the times billed exceeded the hours in the day.

While dissenting votes occur, for the first time in an LSUC disbarment vote, one of 40 elected lawyers sitting as Benchers issued a written dissenting opinion. Bencher Thomas J. P. Carey said he was so "fundamentally in disagreement with the majority in Convocation, as well as the Discipline Committee" that he felt compelled to issue the dissent in which he asserted that there was no basis for the Society's initial claims of fraud and that it is notable that the Legal Aid Plan never asked Kopyto to return any of the funds paid to him on the basis of his "inaccurate accounts." Kopyto remains a disbarred lawyer and is not permitted to practise law in Ontario. Writer David Primack added to Carey's argument by pointing out that unrelated funds owing to Kopyto, which were frozen during the disbarment case were eventually paid to him in full.

== Paralegal and legal agent career ==
Kopyto lost his appeal of the Law Society's action in 1993 but continued his career by becoming a paralegal. In 2002, he represented Velma Demerson in her successful attempt to obtain compensation from the Ontario government for having jailed her for 12 months in 1939 for being "incorrigible" because she was unmarried, pregnant and living with a Chinese man.

When the paralegal profession was unregulated, judges and justices of the peace were under no requirement to allow them into their courtrooms and Kopyto has been excluded from individual courtrooms on over 50 occasions.

In 2006, a justice of the peace threw Kopyto out of his courtroom because he was dressed in an open neck sports shirt with a clashing jacket. The incident made the front page of the Toronto Sun. Kopyto responded with a disciplinary complaint against the JP and a lawsuit against the police officer who removed him.

Kopyto faced a more serious problem after May 2007 when a system of regulating paralegals came into effect in Ontario which places the profession under the jurisdiction of the Law Society of Upper Canada and requires individual paralegals to be approved by the law society and found by it to be of "good character" in order to continue their practice. One of the targets of the new regime is lawyers who have been disbarred. Kopyto told an interviewer "When they disbarred me, they clipped my wings, but I could still fly but now, they are trying to shoot the bird. This is worrying me endlessly. How can you have good character as a paralegal if you didn't have good character as a lawyer? I didn't expect a professional guillotine to fall on my neck, but I will not go gently into the night."

The law society's hearings on Kopyto's application for a paralegal licence began in 2009 and continued, intermittently, for five years until the final hearing date on July 10, 2014. In February 2015, the law society's tribunal issued its decision denying Koptyo's application for a paralegal licence over concerns that Kopyto is "ungovernable" though conceding his generosity and devotion to his clients. Tribunal chair Margot Blight wrote in her decision that "Mr. Kopyto continues to be an enigma" in that "He insists that he supports the rule of law, while asserting that he, and his clients, are entitled to disregard legal rules willy nilly (sic) when conscience so dictates."

Kopyto's appeal of the tribunal's decision was heard by a Law Society appeal panel in October 2015. The appeal was rejected in January 2016. On December 2, 2016, the Divisional Court of the Ontario Superior Court of Justice rejected Kopyto's application for a judicial review of the Law Society Tribunal Appeal Division decision, bringing Kopyto's legal battle to an end.

Though unlicensed and no longer able to appear in court on behalf of clients, Kopyto continued to advise clients, draft legal documents for them, and seek standing to represent them at tribunals and hearings. He was forced into retirement as the result of a Superior Court injunction, issued January 7, 2020, which was made following a request by the Law Society of Ontario, that barred him from practising law, providing legal services or holding himself out as a legal agent.

After the ruling, Philip Slayton, a retired lawyer and author of Lawyers Gone Bad (2007), called Kopyto a radical, anti-legal establishment outlier who often used bad judgment, adding that “Nonetheless, people like that have a role – they perform a useful function particularly within the legal profession that tends to be very establishment, very conservative... [Kopyto] acted to excess and was his own worst enemy, but somewhere in all that, there was a person trying to do the right thing and fulfilling a useful role.”

== Broadcasting career ==
Kopyto appeared regularly for several years as a contributor to AM640's The John Oakley Show. He was also a frequent guest on Michael Coren's former shows on the defunct Sun News Network and CTS.

== Awards ==
In 2013, Kopyto was presented the inaugural OCLA Civil Liberties Award by the Ontario Civil Liberties Association.
