= League for Socialist Action (Canada) =

Trotskyist political organization in Canada

- Leader: Maurice Spector; Jack MacDonald; Earle Birney; Ross Dowson; John Riddell
- Founder: Maurice Spector; Jack MacDonald
- Founded: 1932 as the International Left Opposition (Trotskyist) of Canada; 1961 as the League for Socialist Action
- Dissolved: 1977
- Split from: Communist Party of Canada
- Merged into: Revolutionary Workers League
- Youth wing: Young Socialists / Ligue des Jeunes Socialistes
- Ideology: Trotskyism
- International affiliation: International Left Opposition (1930s); Fourth International; International Committee of the Fourth International (1953–1963); United Secretariat of the Fourth International (1963–1977)

The League for Socialist Action (LSA; French: Ligue Socialiste Ouvrière, LSO) was a Canadian Trotskyist organization. It was the main organizational expression of Trotskyism in English Canada for much of the period from the early 1930s until 1977, when the LSA/LSO joined with the Revolutionary Marxist Group, the Groupe Marxiste Révolutionnaire and the Young Socialists/Ligue des Jeunes Socialistes to form the Revolutionary Workers League/Ligue Ouvrière Révolutionnaire.

The organization existed under several names before adopting the LSA name in 1961. In chronological order, it was known as the International Left Opposition (Trotskyist) of Canada, the Workers Party of Canada, the Socialist Policy Group, the Socialist Workers League, the Revolutionary Workers Party, The Club, the Socialist Education League, and finally the League for Socialist Action.

== Origins ==
The Canadian Trotskyist movement originated in the late 1920s among dissidents in and around the Communist Party of Canada. Maurice Spector, editor of the Communist Party newspaper The Worker, was a Canadian delegate to the 1928 Comintern Congress in Moscow. At the same congress, Spector and American communist James P. Cannon encountered Leon Trotsky's suppressed critique of the draft program of the Communist International and began to move toward the politics of the Left Opposition. Palmer writes that Spector and Cannon "soon came together" after the Sixth Congress and understood that Trotsky's draft program required careful study by trusted supporters who could work toward building a Left Opposition in North America.

Spector was expelled from the Communist Party in late 1928. Palmer describes his expulsion as part of a wider expulsion of avowed North American Trotskyists and writes that Spector's letter defending the Left Opposition was one of the most detailed statements produced by the early North American Trotskyist current. Jack MacDonald, formerly the national secretary of the Communist Party of Canada, later joined the Canadian Trotskyist movement. In 1932, Canadian supporters of the Left Opposition organized as the International Left Opposition (Trotskyist) of Canada.

The Canadian Trotskyist movement experienced several splits and reorganizations during the 1930s. In 1934, a group led by William Krehm left to form the Canadian section of the Organizing Committee for a Revolutionary Workers Party, associated with B. J. Field in the United States. The Fieldite group published Workers Voice and, for a time, was more active than the Trotskyist organization led by Spector and MacDonald, but it faded by the outbreak of World War II.

Also in 1934, the International Left Opposition, led by MacDonald and Spector, abandoned its attempt to reform the Communist Party and became the Workers Party of Canada. It published a monthly newspaper, The Vanguard, which became fortnightly in 1935. The Workers Party also published a twice-monthly Ukrainian-language newspaper, Labor News, and a youth publication, first called October Youth and later Young Militant.

The Workers Party was divided over its orientation to the newly formed Co-operative Commonwealth Federation (CCF). In 1937, a majority voted to join the CCF, where they operated as the Socialist Policy Group and published Socialist Action. The group was soon expelled from the CCF and reunited with the minority that had opposed CCF work. In 1939, they formed the Socialist Workers League, with Earle Birney as a principal leader; by this time, MacDonald and Spector had both withdrawn from active leadership of the movement.

== World War II ==
The Socialist Workers League was forced underground during World War II because of the War Measures Act and the Defence of Canada Regulations. Its anti-war publications were banned. According to John Riddell and Ian Angus, SWL member Frank Watson became the first person imprisoned under the Defence of Canada Regulations after denouncing the war at a street-corner meeting in Toronto.

Birney withdrew from the organization during the war. Ross Dowson later attributed Birney's departure to his support for the war effort, although this assessment came from an internal movement source and should be read as a partisan account. By the early 1940s the organized Trotskyist movement in Canada had become largely inactive.

== Revolutionary Workers Party ==
The organization was rebuilt in the mid-1940s as the Revolutionary Workers Party (RWP), the Canadian section of the Fourth International, under the leadership of Ross Dowson. Canadian supporters of the Fourth International held a national convention in Montreal in 1944, laying the basis for the post-war relaunch of the organization.

Dowson ran for mayor of Toronto as an open Trotskyist at the end of the war. Alexander states that he won more than 20 per cent of the vote. During this period, the RWP published Labour Challenge and sought to re-establish open Trotskyist activity in Canada.

== Entrism in the CCF ==
In 1952, the RWP ceased its public activities, including the publication of Labour Challenge, and its members began practicing entryism in the CCF. During this period the group did not use a formal public name and was known internally as "the Club"; Trotskyists in Britain practicing a similar orientation during this period were also known as the Club.

The Canadian section split in 1953, reflecting the international split in the Fourth International between the International Committee of the Fourth International (ICFI) and the International Secretariat of the Fourth International (ISFI). The majority of the RWP, including Ross Dowson, supported James P. Cannon and the ICFI. A minority, including Dowson's brother Murray Dowson and his brother-in-law Joe Rosenthal, split to form the Committee for the Socialist Regroupment of Canada, in sympathy with Bert Cochran's Socialist Union of America, which had split from the Socialist Workers Party and sided with Michel Pablo and the International Secretariat. The minority was informally known as the "Rose Group", after Rosenthal's pseudonym, or as "Labour Forum", the name of the public meetings it organized in Toronto. Those meetings often featured writers associated with the American socialist journal Monthly Review.

Members of the former RWP, whose national committee and branches continued to meet, had difficulty working inside the CCF. Dowson's application for CCF membership was rejected, while other former RWP members and sympathizers faced pressure or exclusion inside the CCF.

== Socialist Education League ==
In 1955, after the expulsion of 15 supporters from the CCF, the Toronto group reconstituted itself as the Socialist Education League (SEL). The SEL pledged support for the election of the CCF and said it sought to support the growth of the CCF's left wing. The group also resumed regular publication with Workers Vanguard. Meanwhile, the Vancouver branch, which had developed disagreements with the Toronto group, became the Socialist Information Centre (SIC).

== League for Socialist Action ==
In 1961, the SEL and the SIC merged to form the League for Socialist Action, with branches in Toronto and Vancouver. The LSA aimed to act as a Marxist tendency inside the newly formed New Democratic Party, which itself had been created from the CCF and the Canadian Labour Congress.

The Young Socialists was established as an autonomous youth wing at the same time. It was active in the New Democratic Youth of Canada, although LSA and Young Socialists members were expelled if discovered by the NDP, which considered membership in the LSA or Young Socialists incompatible with NDP membership.

Outside Toronto, near Orono, Ontario, the LSA owned or used a camp property called Camp Poundmaker, named after the Plains Cree leader. Earlier accounts of the organization record a comic camp song with the lyrics: "Camp Poundmaker's the place for me / Far away from the bourgeoise / Steady and true / I'll be to you / Loyal to the LSA-LSO / Raise on guard the red flag / Cheer it with all your might / Hurray for Camp Poundmaker / Hurray for Camp Poundmaker, maker, Camp Poundmaker!"

The LSA marked the resumption of open Trotskyist activity in Canada after almost a decade of underground or semi-public work. In 1964, a branch was established in Montreal under the name Ligue Socialiste Ouvrière. The youth wing also operated in Quebec as the Ligue des Jeunes Socialistes.

Members of the LSA were involved in the Waffle, the left-wing movement in the NDP, from 1969 until the Waffle's expulsion from the party in 1972. The LSA decided to remain in the NDP after the Waffle left.

In 1972, Dowson stepped down as executive secretary of the LSA and became chair. John Riddell became executive secretary.

== Factional disputes and split ==
In the early 1970s, the United Secretariat of the Fourth International (USFI), formed by the 1963 reunification of major currents in the Fourth International, was divided by an international factional dispute. The majority of the LSA leadership supported the USFI current associated with the Socialist Workers Party (United States).

Supporters of Ernest Mandel, many of them active in the student movement, organized at the LSA's 1973 convention as the Revolutionary Communist Tendency. The tendency later left the LSA and joined the Revolutionary Marxist Group, which supported Mandel's current internationally.

Among the LSA leadership, Alain Beiner, Ruth Bullock, Al Cappe, Joan Newbigging, John Riddell, Ernie Tate and Art Young were signatories of the 1973 "Declaration of the Leninist Trotskyist Tendency", which supported the SWP-aligned position in the USFI. In 1976, Bullock, Riddell, Tate and Young, as well as Dowson, who was no longer a member of the LSA, were among the signatories of "The Verdict", a document supporting the SWP leadership against allegations made by Gerry Healy.

Dowson and his supporters were meanwhile reduced to a minority within the LSA. Their opponents criticized Dowson's sympathy with Canadian economic nationalism and the left-nationalist politics associated with the Waffle. Dowson's group left the LSA in 1974 and formed the Socialist League, which became known as the Forward Group after its newspaper Forward.

== Fusion into the Revolutionary Workers League ==
In 1977, the League for Socialist Action/Ligue Socialiste Ouvrière fused with the Revolutionary Marxist Group, the Quebec-based Groupe Marxiste Révolutionnaire and the Young Socialists/Ligue des Jeunes Socialistes to form the Revolutionary Workers League/Ligue Ouvrière Révolutionnaire. Riddell describes the LSA/LSO as the historic Canadian section of the Fourth International and says the four groups together had close to 500 members and supporters at the time of the fusion. The new RWL/LOR became the Canadian section of the USFI.

== Electoral and social-movement activity ==
The LSA and its predecessors periodically ran candidates in municipal, provincial and federal elections. Ross Dowson's post-war mayoral campaigns in Toronto were among the best-known examples of Trotskyist electoral activity in Canada.

In 1977, the LSA ran Therese Faubert as its candidate in Brampton in the 1977 Ontario general election. The Body Politic described Faubert and New Democratic Party candidate Frank Lowery as among the first known openly gay candidates in a Canadian provincial election. The Canadian Lesbian and Gay Archives' periodical index lists the article "Gays Gain Despite Tory Triumph" in issue 35 of The Body Politic.

The LSA was also active in the anti-war movement, women's liberation and abortion-rights campaigns.

== Documentary film ==
A feature-length documentary, Let's Rent a Train!: Life in the Toronto Branch of the League for Socialist Action, 1961–1977, was released online in 2023. The film was written, produced and directed by Douglas Williams and runs 93 minutes. According to its official website, the documentary is based on interviews with sixty participants and observers, including Don Tapscott, Alice Klein, Judy Rebick, Mitch Podolak and Ann Thomson. Socialist Project states that the film also features paintings by Mike Alewitz and a score by Sam Allison.

John Riddell described the film as a "mosaic of video clips from sixty participants" in the LSA/LSO and wrote that it covers the organization's activity in the anti-Vietnam War movement, the campaign for free speech in Toronto parks, the Fair Play for Cuba Committee, the Royal Commission on the Status of Women, teachers' union activism, socialist caucus work in the NDP and opposition to the 1970 invocation of the War Measures Act.

The film's title refers to an episode in the early Canadian movement against the Vietnam War. Riddell quotes LSA member Ian Angus recalling that, when activists discussed organizing a protest on Parliament Hill in Ottawa, "somebody said, 'Why don't we rent a train!'" and a trainload of protesters travelled to Ottawa.

== See also ==
- League for Socialist Action (UK)
- Revolutionary Workers League (Canada)
- Revolutionary Marxist Group (Canada)
- Socialist League (Canada)
