= Outgames =

Multi-event sporting competitions for the LGBT community

The Outgames were a set of series of multi-event sporting competitions for the LGBTQ community, which is open to all competitors regardless of sexual orientation, or qualification standard. They were sanctioned by the now-defunct GLISA, the Gay and Lesbian International Sport Association. They derived from the original 2006 World Outgames, when the Montreal organizing committee split with the FGG (Federation of Gay Games) over the organization of the 2006 Gay Games, and created their own sanctioning body and series of Games, with the cooperation of the EGLSF (European Gay and Lesbian Sport Federation), the sanctioning body of the EuroGames. After the creation of the World Outgames, regional Games were created to complement the EuroGames, being the North American Outgames and the AsiaPacific Outgames. Outgames editions are accompanied by OutFest cultural festivals and OutRights LGBT rights conventions. The first convention at the 2006 World Outgames developed the Declaration of Montreal.

The Outgames are not to be confused with the Gay Games.

== Gay Games/Outgames Merger Negotiations ==
From late in 2009 – February 28, 2016, the Federation of Gay Games (FGG), host to the Gay Games, and the Gay & Lesbian International Sports Association (GLISA), host to the Outgames, held joint meetings to discuss the feasibility of unifying efforts and hosting a single athletic, cultural and human rights event for the LBGT community. On February 28, 2016 the FGG Board of Directors voted to end further negotiations and discussions with the GLISA. The FGG official statement regarding the decision gave hope that the two organizations could work together but stated the organizations would continue to have separate events. The organizations did not host a unified event in 2022. The 2016 North America Outgames were held in St. Louis and in 2018 The Gay Games were held in Paris. The next, and last, World Outgames which were planned in Miami in 2017 but cancelled before the opening ceremonies.

The two organizations had another failed attempt to merge. The prior attempt to hold a One Quadrennial Event (1QE) in 2018 also failed. The final attempt to merge the games for 2022 was formalized in May 2015 with a signed Memo of Understanding. The FGG and GLISA created the Joint Working Group and tried to create a framework for a combined quadrennial event that would bring together the LGBT community. The failure to unify the games in 2018 and 2022 was due to financial differences. The failure to fully disclose financial information created a lack of trust and increased the risk of combining the events. The event organizers know that the number of athletes and spectators needed to be significantly higher than it was projected in order to make the profit they desire. The Outgames consistently lost money while a study of the Gay Games shows they had a positive financial impact on the host city in 2014.

== List of Outgames ==
=== World Outgames ===
- 2006 World Outgames – Montreal, Quebec, Canada
- 2009 World Outgames – Copenhagen, Denmark
- 2013 World Outgames – Antwerp, Belgium
- 2017 World Outgames – Miami Beach, Florida, United States

=== Asia-Pacific Outgames ===
- 2008 Asia-Pacific Outgames – Melbourne, Victoria, Australia
- 2011 Asia-Pacific Outgames – Wellington, Wellington Region, New Zealand
- 2014 Asia-Pacific Outgames – Darwin, Northern Territory, Australia
- ~~2016 Asia-Pacific Outgames – Auckland, North Island, New Zealand~~ ^{Note 1}

=== North American Outgames ===
- 2007 North American Outgames – Calgary, Alberta, Canada
- 2011 North American Outgames – Vancouver, British Columbia, Canada
- ~~2016 North American Outgames – St. Louis, Missouri, United States~~ ^{Note 2}
- ~~2020 North American Outgames – Winnipeg, Manitoba, Canada~~ ^{Note 3}

Note 1. Cancelled in favour of independent Proud to Play NZ Games.
Note 2. Cancelled due to low registration and poor financial backing.
Note 3. Winnipeg dropped the Outgames in August 2017 after the 2017 World Outgames Miami were cancelled at the last minute.

== See also ==
- Gay Games / Federation of Gay Games
- EuroGames ( European Gay and Lesbian Multi-Sports Championships ) / European Gay and Lesbian Sport Federation
- Europride
- Principle 6 campaign
