= Gay and Lesbian International Sport Association =

Sports association (?–2016)

Logo for GLISA

The Gay and Lesbian International Sport Association (GLISA) was an international gay and lesbian, culture and human rights association. Their last update was issued in March 2016, and the website has been offline since October 2017. The focus of GLISA was developing gay and lesbian sport worldwide. This was engineered through sanctioning world and continental games, creating a global calendar of LGBT events, fostering the creation of new LGBT federations, clubs and teams, supporting existing LGBT sport organizations, working in partnership with other sport organization to pursue this mandate, and providing the financial framework to support GLISA's global efforts.

The Gay and Lesbian International Sport Association was a democratically governed, international association of LGBT sport and human rights organizations. Modeled after existing multi-sport organizations, GLISA’s members were international sporting federations, human rights organizations, continental associations representing sport teams and clubs from the major regions of the world, host cities of GLISA’s World Outgames, and other organizations that support the mandate of GLISA.

GLISA aimed to expand LGBT rights by requiring that a human rights conference be included at every event sanctioned as an Outgames. The first World Outgames in Montreal, Canada, produced the Declaration of Montreal.

The organization cancelled the 2016 Asia Pacific Outgames, 2016 North American Outgames and 2017 World Outgames. According to some LGBTQ+ activists, GLISA had failed to achieve its vision and had damaged the greater LGBTQ+ Sports Community. These activists called on GLISA and the Outgames brand to formally dismantle and dissolve.

== History ==
GLISA was formed by an international working group brought together by the Montreal 2006 organizers. In 2003, the Federation of Gay Games (FGG) withdrew its sanction of Montreal, because of a dispute over the size of the event and demands of overall control of the Montreal 2006 budget by the FGG. Through an informal survey, Montreal found that several athletes and organizations were willing to participate in the event even if the FGG did not want to come to an agreement with the Montreal 2006 organizers. Montreal 2006, with support from its partners including the city of Montreal, the Province of Québec and the Federal government decided to go forward with the event. In order to create a legacy for the games—and a newly integrated concept: a human rights conference—Montreal 2006 organizers brought representatives from every continent to form an organization that would reflect the needs of the wider community. Out of this meeting of representatives sprung the Gay and Lesbian International "Sport" Association and a new sport, culture and human rights event: the World OutGames.

GLISA licensed the first edition of the World Outgames to Montreal 2006. GLISA licensed the rights the second edition of the World Outgames Copenhagen, Denmark 2008. Antwerp, Belgium, hosted the sport, culture and human rights event in 2013.

The next world Outgames was scheduled to be held in May 2017 in Miami Beach, Florida, USA, but was abruptly cancelled on the first day of the event.

=== Regional outgames ===
After establishing the World Outgames, GLISA supported the establishment of continental outgames, including the North American Outgames and the AsiaPacific Outgames, intending to hold them every three years.

In 2007, the North American Outgames were held in Calgary, Canada, and the 2008 Asia-Pacific Outgames were held in Melbourne, Australia. In 2011, the North American Outgames were held in Vancouver, Canada and the Asia-Pacific Outgames were held in Wellington, New Zealand. Darwin, Australia, hosted the 3rd Asia-Pacific Outgames in May 2014.

Both the 2016 Asia Pacific and North American Outgames were subsequently cancelled due to massive disorganization. No future events were scheduled.

== See also ==
- 2006 World Outgames
- European Gay and Lesbian Multi-Sports Championships (EuroGames) / European Gay and Lesbian Sport Federation
- Gay and Lesbian Tennis Alliance (GLTA)
- Gay Games / Federation of Gay Games
- Principle 6 campaign
