= Mark Tewksbury =

Canadian swimmer (born 1968)

Mark Tewksbury CC MSM
Personal information
- Full name: Mark Roger Tewksbury
- Born: February 7, 1968 (age 58) Calgary, Alberta, Canada
- Height: 1.85 m (6 ft 1 in)
- Weight: 80 kg (176 lb)

Sport
- Country: Canada
- Sport: Swimming
- Strokes: Backstroke
- College team: University of Calgary
- Coach: Deryk Snelling (U. of Calgary)
Medal record
Men's swimming
Representing Canada
Olympic Games
Gold medal – first place	1992 Barcelona	100 m backstroke
Silver medal – second place	1988 Seoul	4×100 m medley
Bronze medal – third place	1992 Barcelona	4×100 m medley
World Championships (LC)
Silver medal – second place	1991 Perth	100 m backstroke
Pan Pacific Championships
Gold medal – first place	1987 Brisbane	100 m backstroke
Silver medal – second place	1987 Brisbane	200 m backstroke
Silver medal – second place	1991 Edmonton	100 m backstroke
Silver medal – second place	1991 Edmonton	4x100 m medley
Bronze medal – third place	1989 Tokyo	100 m backstroke
Commonwealth Games
Gold medal – first place	1986 Edinburgh	100 m backstroke
Gold medal – first place	1986 Edinburgh	4×100 m medley
Gold medal – first place	1990 Auckland	100 m backstroke
Gold medal – first place	1990 Auckland	4×100 m medley

Mark Roger Tewksbury, CC MSM (born February 7, 1968) is a Canadian former competitive swimmer. He is best known for winning the gold medal in the 100-metre backstroke at the 1992 Summer Olympics. He also hosted the first season of How It's Made, a Canadian documentary series, in 2001.

Tewksbury was awarded the Meritorious Service Medal (Civil Division) in 1993 for being a "motivational speaker and a gifted athlete."

== Competitive swimming ==
Raised in Calgary, Alberta, Tewksbury trained at the University of Calgary with Hall of Fame Coach Deryk Snelling.

He competed at the 1988 Summer Olympics in Seoul, South Korea, and won a silver medal as a member of Canada's relay team. He received extra attention when he hung a bed sheet outside his window in the Olympic Village, which read "Hero to Zero in 9.79". This was directed at his compatriot, the initial gold medallist sprinter over 100m, Ben Johnson, after he failed a doping test and was disqualified. For some years he ranked as one of the top backstrokers in the world; never a strong below-the-water swimmer, he was unmatched on the surface, but, as the importance of below-the-water swimming increased, Tewksbury's ranking began to fall.

Going into Barcelona, Tewksbury was ranked fourth in the world and most pundits picked one of the powerful American swimmers to win gold. American Jeff Rouse, world record holder in the 100m backstroke, had beaten Tewksbury at the 1991 Pan Pacific Games and 1991 World Aquatics Championships the year before and was heavily favored to win gold. Using an underwater dolphin kick start Rouse took off to an early lead, leaving Tewksbury to play catch-up on both laps. Tewksbury would pass Rouse on the last stroke of the race, beating the American by just six one hundredths of a second—the same margin of victory Rouse had bested Tewksbury the year before at World Championships. Tewksbury would credit using visualization during his preparation to help instill self-belief and calm in the moments before the Olympic final.

Tewksbury's gold medal was Canada's first at the Barcelona games and the first Canadian gold in swimming since the Communist-boycotted 1984 Olympics in Los Angeles. Tewksbury also won a bronze medal in the relay event in Barcelona. He made the cover of Time magazine. He was inducted into the Canadian Olympic Hall of Fame, Canada's Sports Hall of Fame, and the International Swimming Hall of Fame and was named Canada's Male Athlete of the Year. After the Barcelona games, Tewksbury retired from swimming.

== Post-swimming career ==
After retirement, Tewksbury received a number of high-profile endorsement deals and worked as an athlete representative with the International Olympic Committee (IOC), a position from which he resigned in disenchantment in 1998, accusing the IOC of rampant corruption. He was also part of the group of former Olympic athletes that was pushing for the resignation of IOC President Juan Antonio Samaranch. Only months after the scandal surrounding the 2002 Salt Lake City Olympic winter Games broke, Tewksbury became prominent around the world as a critic of the IOC and demanded reforms to the system.

In 1993, Tewksbury and Mark Leduc both gave interviews about their homosexuality to the CBC Radio series The Inside Track for "The Last Closet", a special episode about homophobia in sports; however, as neither was ready to fully come out at the time, both interviews were given anonymously and recorded through voice filters. In December 1998, Tewksbury officially came out as gay; he subsequently lost a six-figure contract as a motivational speaker because he was "too openly gay."

Tewksbury was also highly critical of Swimming Canada's organization in the wake of the national team's poor performance at the 2004 Summer Olympics in Athens, where they failed to medal. He suggested that there was a lack of accountability within Swim Canada, and that head coach Dave Johnson was given too much power.

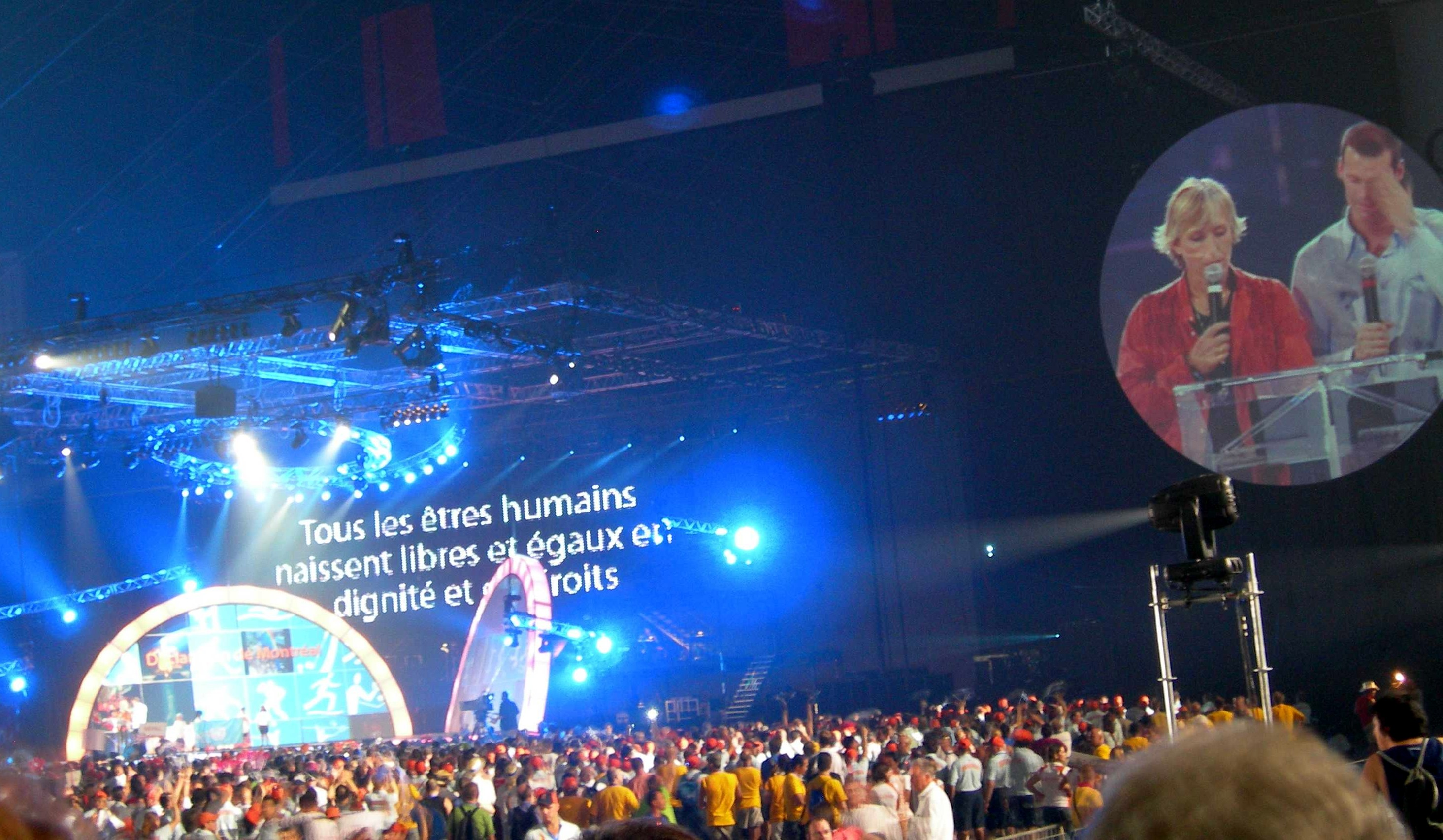
Tewksbury and Martina Navratilova read the Declaration of Montreal at the opening ceremonies of the World Outgames.

Tewksbury became a prominent advocate for gay rights and gay causes in Canada and the world. On May 16, 2003, Tewksbury joined the board of directors for the 2006 World Outgames in Montreal and was named co-president. He was a panelist at the 2003 National Gay and Lesbian Athletics Conference in Cambridge, Massachusetts, on a panel of LGBT Olympians that also included rower Harriet Metcalf and high jumper Brian Marshall.

Tewksbury was the narrator for the TV show How It's Made during the first season. In 2006, he published his second book, an autobiography entitled Inside Out: Straight Talk from a Gay Jock. Tewksbury remains a public figure working as a motivational speaker, a television commentator for swimming events, and a continued activist. He is a board member of the Gay and Lesbian Athletics Foundation.

On November 30, 2006 Tewksbury was the Master of Ceremonies for the Tribute to former Prime Minister Paul Martin at the Liberal Party of Canada's Leadership and Biennial Convention in Montreal.

During the 2008 Summer Olympics, Tewksbury served as CBC Sports' swimming analyst alongside play-by play announcer Steve Armitage.

In December 2008 Tewksbury was invited by the government of France to speak at the United Nations in New York City on the day that a declaration was introduced that affirms gay rights and seeks to decriminalize homosexuality.

On September 19, 2009, Tewksbury was inducted into Canada's LGBT Human Rights Hall of Fame, the Q Hall of Fame Canada, in honour of his outstanding achievements and efforts to end discrimination in the sports world.

On August 5, 2010, he was named the chef de mission of the 2012 Canadian Summer Olympic team.

In 2015, Tewksbury was presented the Bonham Centre Award from The Mark S. Bonham Centre for Sexual Diversity Studies, University of Toronto, for his contributions to the advancement and education of issues around sexual identification.

On July 23, 2015, Tewksbury presented his gold medal to the Canadian Museum for Human Rights in Winnipeg for an exhibit promoting the power of sport to influence positive change.

In 2017, Tewksbury was chosen as a Grand Marshal for the Fierté Canada Pride Montreal.

In May 2019, Tewksbury performed an autobiographical one-man show called Belong, which was produced by Wordfest and staged at the DJD Dance Centre in Calgary. The performance was a spin-off of his 2018 staged reading called 50 & Counting at Buddies in Bad Times theatre in Toronto. Belong was then restaged in January 2020 as part of One Yellow Rabbit theatre’s 34th annual High Performance Rodeo in Calgary.

In 2020, he became a Companion of the Order of Canada.

In 2022, he appeared as a panelist in Canada Reads, advocating for Esi Edugyan's novel Washington Black.

== See also ==
- List of members of the International Swimming Hall of Fame
- List of Commonwealth Games medallists in swimming (men)
- List of Olympic medalists in swimming (men)
- World record progression 100 metres backstroke
- World record progression 4 × 100 metres medley relay
