= International Day Against Homophobia, Biphobia and Transphobia =

Worldwide day of awareness

- Also called: IDAHOBIT
- Observed by: people worldwide
- Significance: Removal of homosexuality from the International Classification of Diseases of the World Health Organization
- Date: 17 May
- Next time: 17 May 2027
- Frequency: Annual
- First time: 17 May 2005

The International Day Against Homophobia, Biphobia and Transphobia (IDAHOBIT) , also called International Day Against Homophobia, Transphobia and Biphobia (IDAHOTB), is observed on 17 May and aims to coordinate international events that raise awareness of LGBTQ rights violations and stimulate interest in LGBTQ rights work worldwide. By 2016, the commemorations had taken place in over 130 countries.

The founders of the International Day Against Homophobia, as it was originally known, established the IDAHO Committee to coordinate grassroots actions in different countries, to promote the day and to lobby for official recognition on May 17. That date was chosen to commemorate the decision to remove homosexuality from the International Classification of Diseases of the World Health Organization (WHO) in 1990.

== History ==
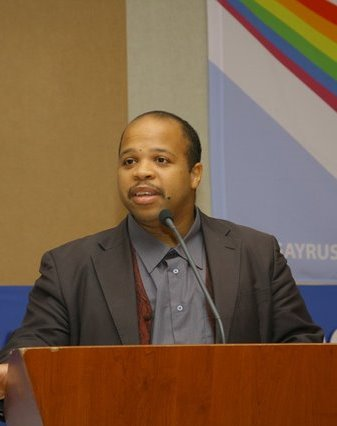
Louis-Georges Tin, founder of the International Day Against Homophobia, Transphobia and Biphobia

The day, as a concept, was conceived in 2004. A year-long campaign culminated in the first International Day Against Homophobia on May 17, 2005. 24,000 individuals as well as organizations such as the International Lesbian and Gay Association (ILGA), the International Gay and Lesbian Human Rights Commission (IGLHRC), the World Congress of LGBT Jews, and the Coalition of African Lesbians signed an appeal to support the "IDAHO initiative" (named after the U.S. state with the same name). Activities for the day took place in many countries, including the first LGBT events ever to take place in the Congo, China, and Bulgaria. In the UK, the campaign was coordinated by the Gay and Lesbian Humanist Association (GALHA).

The date of May 17 was specifically chosen to commemorate the World Health Organization's decision in 1990 to declassify homosexuality as a mental disorder.

In 2009, transphobia was added to the name of the campaign, expanding the acronym from IDAHO to IDAHOT, and activities that year focused primarily on transphobia (violence and discrimination against transgender people). A new petition was launched in cooperation with LGBTQ organizations in 2009, and it was supported by more than 300 NGOs from 75 countries, as well as three Nobel Prize winners (Elfriede Jelinek, Françoise Barré-Sinoussi, and Luc Montagnier). On the eve of May 17, 2009, France became the first country in the world to officially remove transgender issues from its list of mental illnesses.

Frenchman Louis-Georges Tin was founder of the day, and acted as its Committee Chairperson until his resignation in September 2013. He was succeeded by internationally renowned Venezuelan trans rights activist, lawyer and law professor Tamara Adrián, who became one of the first trans legislators in Latin America in 2015.

Louis-Georges Tin and two other Committee members started a hunger strike in June 2012 to urge the French president François Hollande to introduce a UN resolution decriminalising homosexuality.

Biphobia was added to the name of the campaign in 2015, expanding the acronym IDAHOT by the letter B to its current form IDAHOTB, sometimes written as IDAHOBT.

The Enforcement Act of Judicial Yuan Interpretation No. 748 that legalised same-sex marriage in Taiwan was passed on International Day Against Homophobia, Transphobia and Biphobia in 2019, with the law coming into effect on 24 May 2019.

In some countries, it is also referred to as the International Day Against LGBTQIA+ Discrimination.

== Goals and activities ==
The main purpose of the May 17 mobilisations is to raise awareness of violence, discrimination, and repression of LGBTQ communities worldwide, which in turn provides an opportunity to take action and engage in dialogue with the media, policymakers, public opinion, and wider civil society

One of the stated goals of May 17 is to create an event that can be visible at a global level without needing to conform to a specific type of action. This decentralized approach is needed due to the diversity of social, religious, cultural, and political contexts in which rights violations occur. As such, this leads to a variety of events and approaches towards celebrating the International Day Against Homophobia.

Despite the three principal issues mentioned in the name of the celebration, this day is widely regarded as an initiative that is "working to advance the rights of people with diverse sexual orientations, gender identities or expressions, and sex characteristics." This allows for a widespread amalgamation of different self-identified expressions coming together to share pride in oneself, happiness, and love with others as participants take charge against different rampant forms of hate in the world.

== Official recognition ==
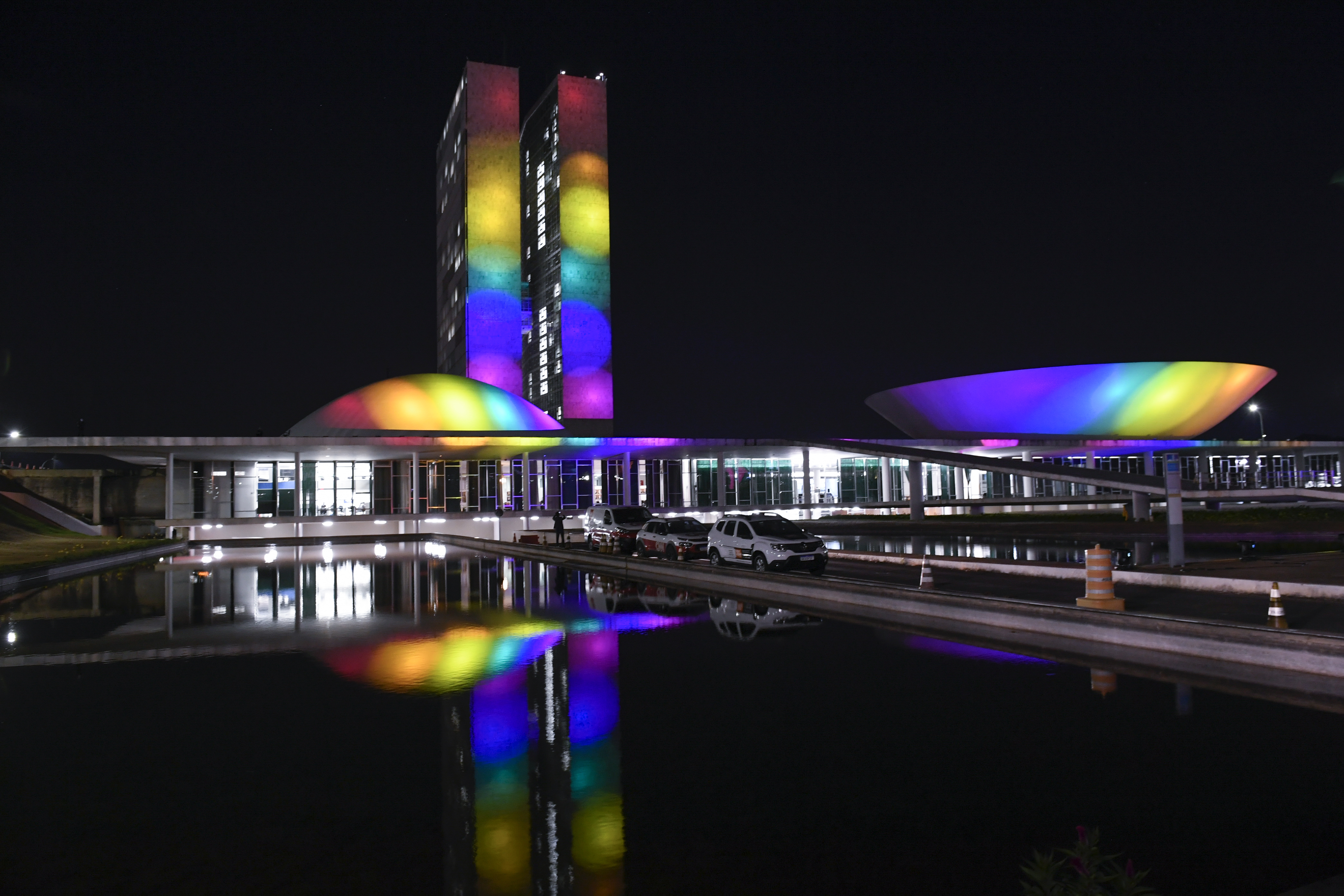
National Congress of Brazil illuminated with rainbow colors in 2022 IDAHOTIB

In 2006, the Declaration of Montreal was created and adopted by the 2006 World Outgames. The Declaration demanded that the United Nations and all states recognize May 17 as the International Day Against Homophobia.

In 2007, in Aosta Valley (Italy), the government approved support for the IDAHOT.

In 2010, Lula, then president of Brazil, signed an act that instituted May 17 as the National Day Against Homophobia in his country.

The day is also officially recognized by the EU Parliament, Spain, Portugal, Belgium, the UK, Mexico, Costa Rica, Croatia, the Netherlands, France (where May 17 was the chosen date for the promulgation of the law allowing same-sex marriage in 2013), Luxembourg and Venezuela. It is also recognized by numerous local authorities, such as the province of Quebec or the city of Buenos Aires.

In 2012, the city of Liverpool, England, created a pioneering programme of events in association with the organisation Homotopia, called IDAHO 50. The event was supported by 50 leading organisations based in Liverpool.

On March 21, 2014, Mexico declared, by Presidential Decree, May 17 as the National Day Against Homophobia.

Venezuela's National Assembly (AN) officially recognized May 17 as the Day against Homophobia, Transphobia and Biphobia on May 12, 2016. AN Deputy Tamara Adrian, also international Chairwoman of the IDAHO Committee, hailed the legislative act as a "sign of change" in a Venezuela where "everyone has equal rights and opportunities".

In several other countries (e.g. Argentina, Bolivia, Australia, and Croatia), national civil society coalitions have called upon their authorities to have May 17 officially recognized.

As it stands as of May 17, 2021, the International Day Against Homophobia, Transphobia, and Biphobia has been commemorated in over 130 different countries across the globe.

In 2024, United States President, Joe Biden, renewed his support for IDAHOBIT in a White House proclamation, noting his support for the LGBTQI+ community and their rights, noting that "This is a matter of human rights, plain and simple."

Ahead of IDAHOBIT in 2024, a group of United Nations and regional human rights experts voiced concerns over persistent discrimination and violence due to sexual orientation as well as gender identity, and called on States to increase their efforts in ending it. The experts stated:

"This day is now celebrated in more than 130 countries and is officially recognised by several States, and international institutions. Reflecting on progress over the past two decades is indeed cause for celebration. We call on States to uphold the inherent dignity of all persons, without distinction, by addressing the root causes of discrimination and violence. Measured against the benchmark of 'No one left behind: equality, freedom, and justice for all', it is also a reminder of just how much work still needs to be done, by all stakeholders, including business enterprises, to ensure an end to violence and discrimination directed against all individuals based on sexual orientation and gender identity."

== May 17 around the world ==
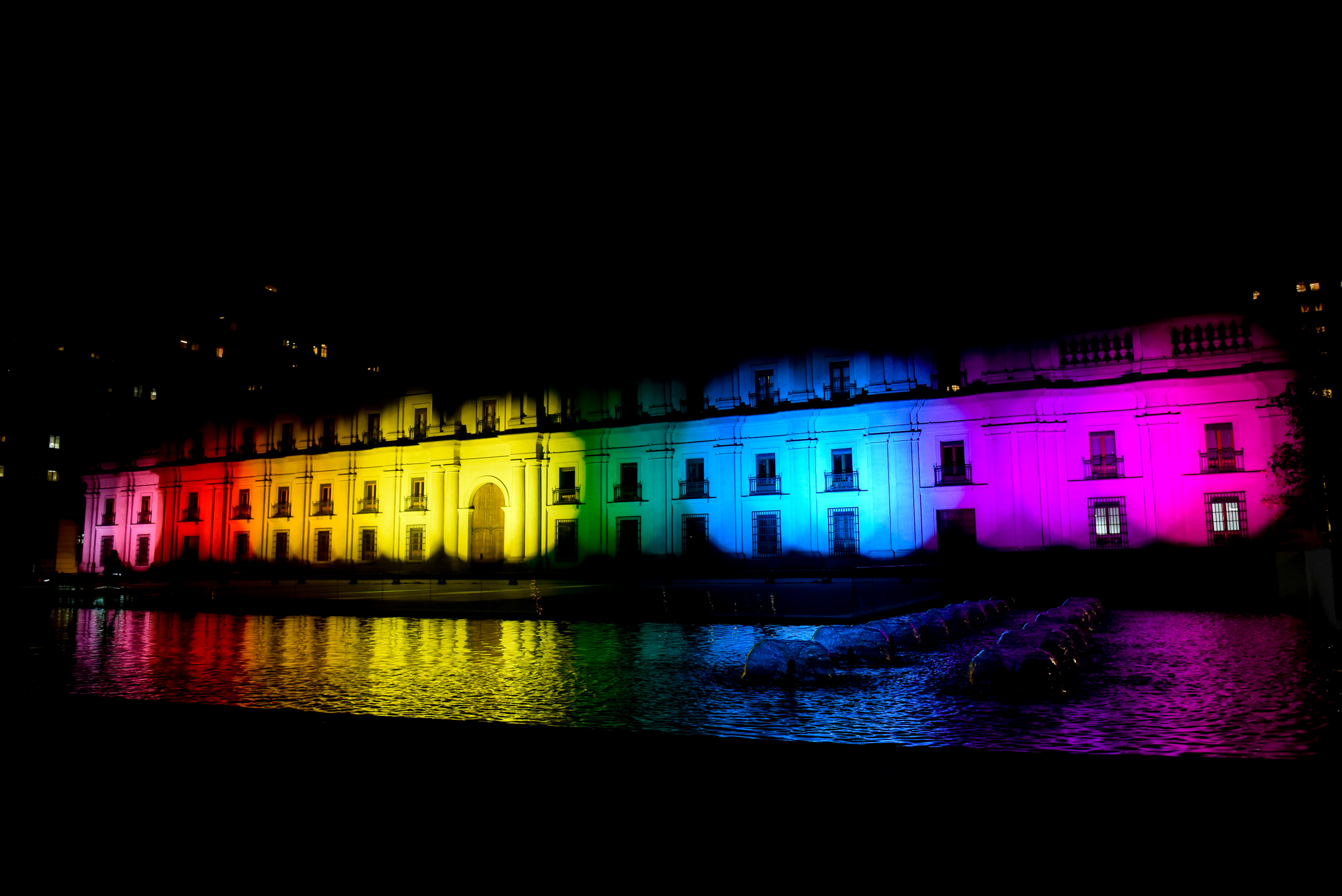
La Moneda Palace illuminated in LGBT flag for 2017 IDAHO

The day is particularly strong in Europe and Latin America, where it is commemorated with public events in almost all countries. May 17 is also marked in multiple countries in all world regions including, in 2013, 32 of the 76 countries in the world where same-sex relationships are criminalised. In Sweden, government bodies have observed the day.

Common actions include large-scale street marches, parades and festivals. In Cuba, for example, Mariela Castro has led out a huge street parade in honor of May 17 for the past three years. In Chile in 2013, 50,000 people took to the streets to mark May 17, and the VIII Santiago Equality march.

Arts and culture-based events are also common. For example, Bangladeshi activists organised the music festival "Love Music Hate Homophobia" in 2013. Albanian LGBT activists have, in 2012 and 2013 been organising an annual Bike (P) Ride for May 17 through the streets of the capital Tirana. In 2013, the day's Committee called for international actions for a Global Rainbow Flashmob to mark May 17. Activists in 100 cities, in 50 countries participated with diverse public events spanning coloured balloon releases, dance flashmobs, musical events, and performance and street art.

On May 17, 2019, Taiwan became the first country in Asia to legally recognize same-sex marriage.

In Nepal, this day is celebrated as International Day Against Queer / MOGAI -phobia as well as IDAHOT.

Some countries and organizations have misinterpreted the letters behind the acronym IDAHOBIT with different meanings beyond those of the official expansions, sometimes mistakenly taking the "I" of "BI" to be standing for intersexphobia. However, the IDAHO committee and ILGA, after consulting with intersex organizations and the community, put out a clarifying note on their website in 2024 that there is no consensus among the intersex community for the inclusion in IDAHOBIT. Despite that, other organizations across the world still include intersectionally intersexphobia, or intersexism, in the acronym, such as through IDAHOTIB or IDAHOTBI.

=== Canada ===
In 2003, the Canadian organization Fondation Émergence, a Quebec-based LGBTQ advocacy organisation, instituted a similar event, the National Day Against Homophobia, which was held on June 1 in Québec.

June of 2005 marked the event's third anniversary, which was celebrated with a posthumous award to the late Prime Minister Pierre Trudeau, who as Minister of Justice introduced legislation which repealed anti-gay clauses from the Criminal Code. Trudeau is also famous for saying that "The state has no business in the bedrooms of the nation" (a sentence taken from an editorial in The Globe and Mail).

In 2006, Fondation Émergence changed the day of observance to May 17, to align with IDAHOBIT. June, now, is the Pride Month.

== Impact ==
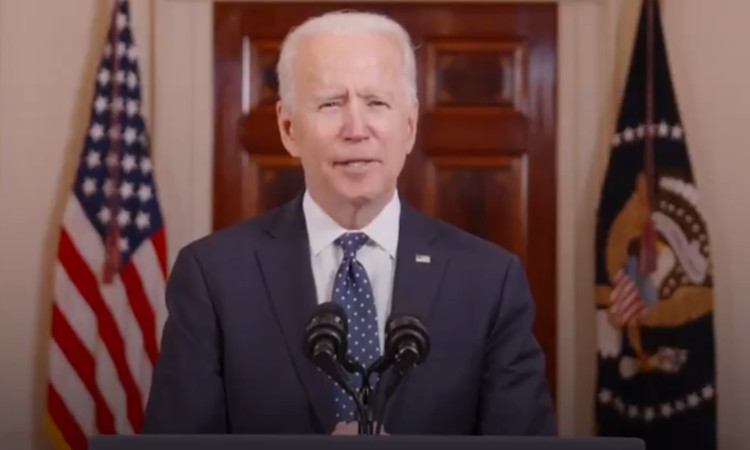
Joe Biden expressing his support of the International day against Homophobia, Transphobia, and Biphobia in 2021

As of 2019, 69 countries criminalize same-sex relationships. Also, in 26 countries, transgender individuals are subjected to punishments, and they are disproportionately at risk of violence across the globe. IDAHOBIT is frequently used as a platform for organizing initiatives to advance the fight for the rights of LGBTQ groups in many countries, even in those (like Uganda) in which homosexuality is criminalized.

In 2021, United States president Joe Biden used IDAHOBIT to highlight efforts to alleviate LGBTQIA+ discrimination and to call on Congress to pass the Equality Act. The same day, Canadian prime minister Justin Trudeau spoke of creating the first federal LGBTQ2 Action Plan and passing "legislation to fully protect gender identity and expression".

In 2024, Achim Steiner, United Nations Development Programme administrator, noted that despite international human rights law requiring all countries to support the rights of LGBTQ people, there are still many countries of the world, including 62 criminalizing same-sex relations, with 12 of them imposing the death-penalty for it. He also noted that "there has also been a recent global pushback on the freedoms of LGBTIQ+ people including new legislation that expands the criminalization of LGBTIQ+ people, including for human rights advocacy in this sphere."

== See also ==
- Biphobia
- Declaration of Montreal
- Heteronormativity
- Heterosexism
- Homophobia
- Human sexuality
- LGBTQ rights by country or territory
- LGBTQ movements
- List of LGBTQ-related observances
- List of LGBTQ events
- National Coming Out Day
- National Day Against Homophobia (Canada)
- Sexual identity
- Societal attitudes toward homosexuality
- Transgender Day of Remembrance
- Transphobia
