= Skwachàys Lodge =

Boutique and art gallery in Vancouver, British Columbia

Coordinates: 49°16′52″N 123°06′22″W

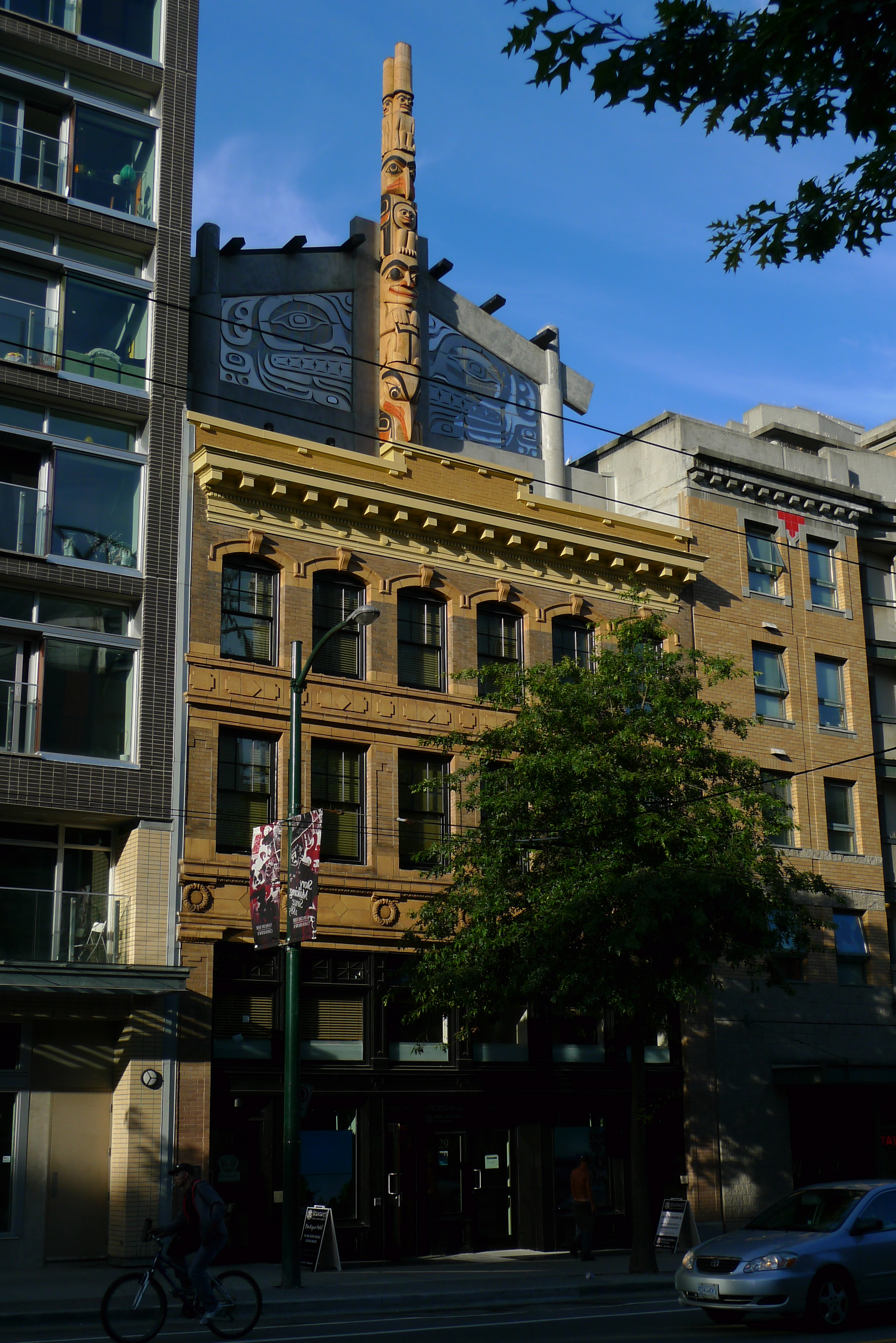
- Street view of Skwachàys Lodge

General information
- Location: 31 West Pender Street, Vancouver, British Columbia, Canada
- Opening: 1913 (as Palmer Rooms); 2012 (as Skwachàys Lodge)
- Operator: British Columbia Indigenous Housing Society (BCIHS)

Technical details
- Floor count: 5

Design and construction
- Architects: Storey and Campbell Co.

Other information
- Number of rooms: 18

Website
- www.skwachays.com

Skwachàys Lodge (skwɑʼt͡ʃaɪs) is an Indigenous-run boutique hotel and art gallery located at 31 West Pender Street in downtown Vancouver, British Columbia, Canada. The hotel originally opened in 1913 as the Palmer Rooms, undergoing two ownership changes before ultimately becoming Skwachàys Lodge. The Skwachàys Lodge combines a hotel setting with on-site housing, an art gallery, and studio spaces for Indigenous artists. The hotel is currently run by the British Columbia Indigenous Housing Society (BCIHS).

== Building history ==
Skwachàys Lodge was built in 1913 on 31 West Pender Street, originally a residential building named the Palmer Rooms. The building was developed by Jonathon Storey and Roderick Campbell Jr, owners of Storey and Campbell Co. The upper floors of the Palmer Rooms acted as a lodging space, with a retail space on the main level. The building underwent several more iterations before the establishment of Skwachàys Lodge.

In 1946, the building was acquired by Lai Hing and became the Wingate Hotel. For roughly 30 years, the hotel was run under this name before becoming the Pender Hotel.

In 2008 the City of Vancouver purchased the building under the Supportive Housing Strategy, funded by the City of Vancouver, BC Government, and Vancouver Coastal Health. In 2010, the management was then passed to BCIHS. Together, BCIHS and Skwachàys Lodge sought to address social and economic prejudices that Indigenous artists may face, offering on-site housing, studio spaces, artist residencies, and gallery opportunities.

Skwachàys Lodge officially opened in 2012, and the name 'Skwachàys' was given to the building in a traditional ceremony by Chief Ian Campbell of the Squamish Nation. The name reflects the traditional name of False Creek.

=== Architecture ===
The first three storeys of the building currently feature the same brick exterior from its days as the Palmer Rooms. From the transition into Skwachàys Lodge, it now also features a traditional longhouse and story pole on top of the building. The longhouse is used as a healing lodge for residents and hotel guests, and just in front of the longhouse stands the 40.5' (12.3 m) story pole, displaying a bear, eagle, man, and raven, with three watchmen on top who watch over the lodge. The building is located in Downtown Eastside (DTES), one of the city's oldest neighbourhoods.

== Hotel functionality ==
When it first opened in 2012, Skwachàys Lodge did not have any intention of partially becoming a hotel. However, due to a lack of demand for the 18 healing lodge apartments, as well as a visitation by InnVentures president Jon Zwickel, it transformed into the 18-room boutique hotel it is today.

The majority of the foundations for how the hotel currently functions were already in place before the decision to change the healing lodge apartments into hotel suites in 2014. However, the major change came from Jon Zwickel's suggestion to unify the identity of the lodge by having their residency artists design individual rooms. This change, in addition to opening the suites to the general public, almost instantly led to increased sales from the gallery, which, in addition to the increase of revenue from room bookings, provided enough encouragement for the lodge to continue to run as a hotel. The hotel doesn't run to turn a profit however, as 100% of what a guest pays a night (~$280 CAD) goes directly into subsidizing the cost of the artists who are staying in residency there.

=== Rooms ===
Guests also have the free opportunity to book traditional smudge ceremonies or sweats within the corresponding rooms on the rooftop patio. These rooms were designed with the original intent of the building in mind, but the establishment has since kept a medicine man on staff to allow guests to experience them. Guests wanting a more hands-off experience also have the opportunity to watch some of the residency artists as they work on new pieces.

As well as the 18 guest rooms within the lodge being entirely unique from one another, with each possessing its own theme along with custom carvings, paintings, and furniture; each floor of the lodge is themed after different animals that are important in Indigenous culture: the raven, eagle, bear, wolf, and orca. The room themes and artists behind their creations are: Clifton Fred (Canadiana, Collage, Poem); Corrine Hunt (Air, Earth, Water); Jerry Whitehead (Drum Circle, Forest, Northern Lights); Lou-Ann Neel (Sea Kingdom, Wilderness Teachings); Mark Preston (Moon, Paddle, Tlingit Hat); Nancy A. Lewis (Northern Lights); Richard Shorty (Feather, Hummingbird, King Salmon); and Sabina Hill (Longhouse, Moon, Paddle, Tlingit Hat).

=== Dining ===
Throughout the years of operation, Skwachàys Lodge has had numerous different small businesses cooking in the welcome room, with each being a small Indigenous-run business with a desire to help the greater community Upon opening in 2014, Cedar Feast House Catering provided all-day meals with a menu that included "wild smoked salmon dip with bannock chips... and wild mushroom duck salad." Cedar Feast was run by culinary arts professor Theresa Contois, and it served as the first job for many of her Indigenous students upon graduation. Sometime before 2017, Cedar Feast moved out and was replaced by Skookum Catering, who currently runs the kitchen for breakfast and baking. In 2018, another catering company, BigHeart Bannock, joined in to provide weekend brunch meals of bannock/bannock french toast, boar and bison sausages, and a vast assortment of berries and jams. BigHeart is run by Lauraleigh Paul Yuxweluputun'aat alongside Larissa Grieves, striving to bring wild foods back into more mainstream Indigenous cuisine. In addition, the idea of running brunch meals at Skwachàys Lodge was in part due to the connection of Laualeigh's Father being Lawrence Paul Yuxweluptun a well-known Indigenous artist.

== Artist residency and gallery ==
Skwachàys Lodge provides an Artist in Residency program to Indigenous artists working in Vancouver that functions in six-month-long intervals, going up to three years. Artists participating in this program have access to housing via hotel suites, along with access to artist workshops, programming, and opportunities to further their skills and experience by working in the gallery at the lodge. The BC Indigenous Housing Society funds this residency program.

Skwachàys Lodge also provides 24 affordable apartments specifically for Indigenous homeless people or those in need through its healing lodge.

The gallery within Skwachàys Lodge displays the work of Indigenous artists. The gallery is run through the work of the artists staying at Skwachàys Lodge and is funded through the revenue created by the hotel.
