= Gay and Lesbian Tennis Alliance =

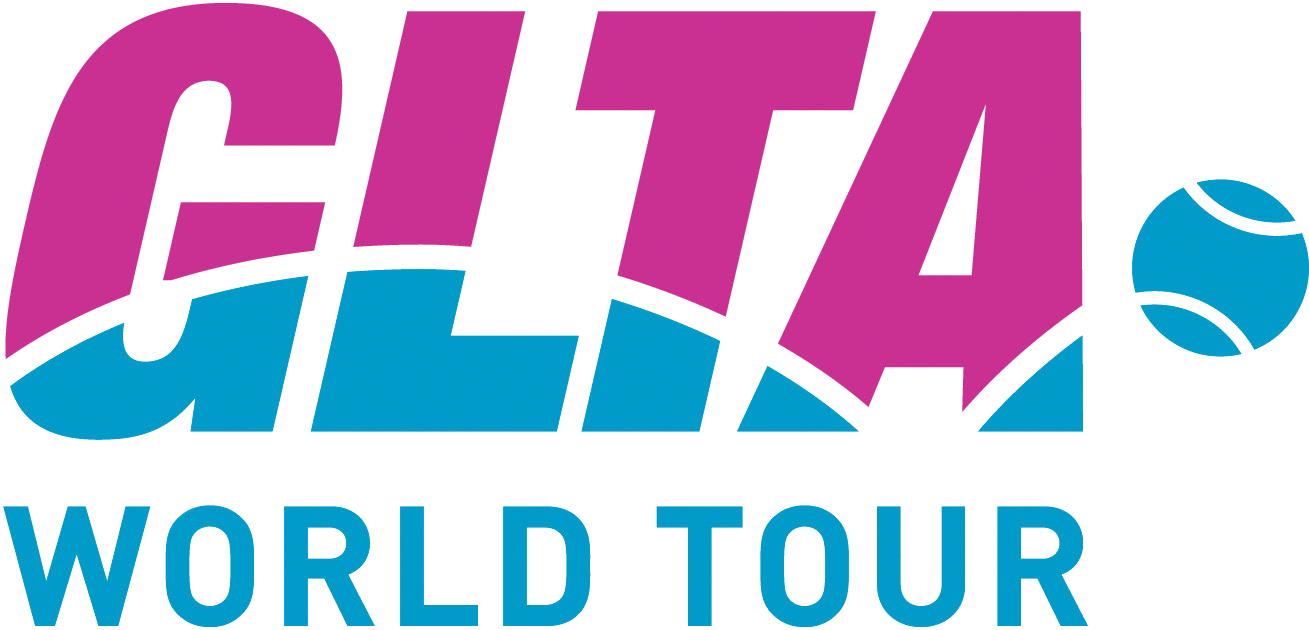
GLTA Logo

The Gay and Lesbian Tennis Alliance (GLTA) is a not-for-profit international organization that manages and sanctions the gay tennis circuit around the world. The goal of the organization is to promote access to tennis and diversity and acceptance within the sport. GLTA-sanctioned tournaments provide a safe space for LGBT players to have fun playing competitive tennis in an environment where all who share the value of diversity are welcome.

== Founding ==
The first gay tennis groups emerged in Dallas, Los Angeles, San Francisco and Houston as early as 1979. During the 1980s an informal gay and lesbian tennis "circuit" began to form. By the late 1980s gay tennis organizations were hosting tournaments that drew players from around the U.S., and the idea of a more formalized gay tennis circuit was becoming popular around the time of the 1990 Gay Games in Vancouver.

The GLTA was founded in 1991, and there are now over 80 gay and lesbian member clubs around the world. The first officers were elected at the San Diego Open in July 1991. The first Commissioner of the GLTA was Scott Williford, who was also elected to the GLTA Hall of Fame in 1992 along with Les Balmain, who founded of the San Francisco Gay Tennis Federation in 1981. Other original GLTA board members were Norm Burgos, David Black, Chris Walker, and Gary Sutton. The organization continued to grow rapidly in the 1990s and spread to Australia, Canada, and Europe.

== Recent Status ==
Tournaments in Thailand, Ireland and Australia were added to the portfolio of events in 2010, increasing the number of tournaments to over 80 around the globe. An estimated 10,000 players take part in GLTA tournaments each year, and the number of tournaments and players continues to grow. Individual tournaments range in size from less than 100 competitors to over 400. Depending on the location, tournaments take place on grass, clay, or cement (hard) courts. Many tournaments encourage international participation by asking local competitors to host visiting players at their homes.

Players at all levels can compete within divisions determined by ability—the Open division being the highest, followed by divisions A, B, C, and D. Where possible, similar divisions are provided for players over 40 years old. Each year, an international GLTA World Tour Championships invites the top 8 players in each of the 5 GLTA divisions to compete.

Tournaments are usually organized at a local level by clubs and associations, while the GLTA provides technical support, governance, and direction. Each event raises funds for charitable causes chosen by that particular association, and each cause usually has a tie to gay and lesbian issues such as HIV prevention or the mentoring of gay youth.

The GLTA is developing partnerships with national sports organizations such as the United States Tennis Association (USTA) which have identified diversity as a worthwhile objective. The organization has begun to formulate a financial and organizational support strategy to bring events to communities where the political, legal, and cultural situation for gays and lesbians limits opportunities to compete in the sport without hiding their sexuality.

== See also ==
- Gay Games
- [EuroGames]
- LGBT community
- World Outgames
