= National Gay Basketball Association =

The National Gay Basketball Association (NGBA) is an LGBTQ sports organization which exists to promote gay, lesbian, bisexual, and transgender athletic participation in basketball.

Founded in 2003 by Mark Chambers, who also co-founded the Lambda Basketball League, to help LGBT players create city leagues, travel teams, and to allow individual players the ability to find a place or team to participate in LGBT basketball events that are held around the world. The organizational board, consisting of Mark Chambers, Ted Cappas, Jeff Hermann and Rob Smithermann, help NGBA incorporated in May 2005.

The NGBA played a key role in the success of the 2006 Chicago Gay Games basketball event by introducing four new categories in men and women's brackets, A division, B division, C division, 35 and older, and 50 and older 3 on 3 half court, Basketball hosting the most teams in the history of the Gay Basketball.

The first official NGBA event was hosted by Salt Lake City in October 2006.

The inaugural World Gay Basketball Championships were scheduled for May 2020 in South Florida.
