= North America Outgames =

Sporting Event

The North America Outgames were a multi-sport event held every three years by the Gay and Lesbian International Sport Association for LGBT athletes in North America. They were a regional derivation of the World Outgames, which is also held by GLISA, and they are held on different years than the World Outgames. GLISA was dissolved after the cancellation of the 2017 World Outgames IV.

== History ==
=== 2007 ===
The first North America Outgames were held in Calgary, Alberta, Canada, from April 1 to 8, 2007. They were opened by Judy Shepard, mother of Matthew Shepherd and president of the Matthew Shepard Foundation.

Concurrently with the Outgames, other events were held, including OutRights (that event's name for the human rights conference which typically accompanies all games held under the Outgames brand) and OutFest, a cultural festival. Among the highlights of OutFest was a 90-minute performance by Lily Tomlin, her first comedic performance in Calgary.

Research of attendees was conducted by ZINC Research, which also sponsored the event.

=== 2011 ===
The second North America Outgames were held in Vancouver, British Columbia, Canada, from July 25 to 31, 2011. More than 800 athletes and volunteers were in attendance for the event, which also covered the cities of Whistler and Burnaby.

This was the second international LGBT multi-sport event to be held in Vancouver, preceded by the 1990 Gay Games, which faced much stiffer public opposition at the time and did not receive funding by the provincial government, then run by the Social Credit Party under Bill Vander Zalm. In comparison, the Liberal government gave some $75,000 towards the sports events and $81,000 for the human rights conference, while the rest of the CAN$1.25 million budget has been funded through private sales and donations.

The bid committee for the event was joined in 2009 by John Boychuk, former president of the Vancouver Pride society; Boychuk currently heads the organizing committee for the event.

The theme song of the event is "Come Out and Play", penned and sung by local band Sugarbeach. Medals for the event were designed by Corrine Hunt, a Vancouver-based lesbian designer who had also designed the medals for the 2010 Winter Olympics.

=== 2016 ===
The third North America Outgames was scheduled to be held in St. Louis, Missouri, USA, May 28 - June 4, 2016, but was cancelled due to low registration and poor financial backing.

=== 2020 ===
The fourth North American Outgames were awarded to Winnipeg, Manitoba, Canada, but Winnipeg dropped the Outgames in August 2017 after the 2017 World Outgames Miami were cancelled at the last minute. The North America GLISA website is no longer active.

== Games ==
| Edition | Year | Host | | Dates | Notes |
|---|---|---|---|---|---|
| I | 2007 | Calgary | Canada | 2007-04-01—2007-04-08 | |
| II | 2011 | Vancouver | Canada | 2011-07-25—2011-07-31 | |
| III | 2016 | St. Louis | USA | May 28 - June 4, 2016 | Cancelled |

== See also ==
- EuroGames - separately organized European-continental LGBT multi-sport event held on different years than both the World Outgames and the Gay Games.
- AsiaPacific Outgames - held in the Asia-Pacific region
