= Corrine Hunt =

Canadian artist (born 1959)

- Born: 1959 (age 66–67)
- Other name: Nugwam Gelatleg'lees
- Occupation: Jeweller designer

Corrine Hunt (born 1959), also known as Nugwam Gelatleg'lees, is a Kwakwaka'wakw/Tlingit artist, carver, jeweller and designer based in Vancouver, British Columbia, Canada.

== Early life ==
Hunt is a member of the Raven Gwa'waina clan from Ts'akis, or Alert Bay, British Columbia and was born in 1959. Her grandmother, A'naeesla'ga, also known as Mary Ebbetts née Hunt (Ansnaq, Anislaga, A'naeesla'ga and Anain) (1823–1919), was a member of the Raven clan of the Taantakwáan (Tongass) tribe of the Tlingit nation of what is now southeastern Alaska. Mary was the daughter of Chief Keishíshk' Shakes IV and S’eitlin, a Deisheetaan (Gaanax.ádi) woman from Aan goon (Angoon). It was from A'naeesla'ga that she inherited the name Nugwan Gelatleg'lees – "Killer Whale scratching her back on the beach" in 1965. Her paternal grandfather, Jonathan Hunt, was a Kwakwaka'wakw chief.

Hunt's family includes Kwakwaka'wakw artists Henry Hunt, Tony Hunt, Richard Hunt and Stanley Hunt. She credits her uncle, jewellery engraver Norman Brotchie, as sparking her interest in creating art and was instrumental in introducing her to Kwakwaka'wakw art. Having lived in the Vancouver area since 1975, Hunt attended Simon Fraser University, majoring in Anthropology and Latin American studies.

== Works ==
Hunt's works include engraved gold and silver jewellery and accessories, custom furnishings in carved stainless steel and reclaimed wood, modern totem poles and other sculptural installations, such as those at the Hilton Hotel Whistler, Port Coquitlam City Hall Foyer and the Office for Indian and Northern Affairs Canada (INAC).

In 2009, Hunt co-created the medals for the 2010 Olympic Games in Vancouver with designer Omer Arbel. She went on to design medals for North American Outgames 2011 in Vancouver BC.

Hunt designed the logo for the 2006 World Peace Forum held in Vancouver. Her works have also included eyeglasses and fashion accessory designs for the Claudia Alan collection and Mukluks "Corrine Hunt collection for Manitobah," which consisted of the Gatherer mukluk in two styles: Bear and Hummingbird & Flower. Hunt also designed the jackets worn by the Canadian snowboarding team during the 2018 Olympic Games.

Her 2010 table Kwakwaka'wakw is an example of Northwest Coast design being used in contemporary mainstream culture and is exhibited at the Canadian Museum of History.

=== Exhibitions ===
- 1988 Zuni Gallery, Solo shows in Düsseldorf and Hamburg.
- 1989 Navajo Gallery, Portland, OR. Solo Show
- 1990 Navajo Gallery, Portland, OR. Solo Show
- 1991 Granville Native Art Group Show
- 1993 Echoes of Chiefly Feasts: Masterworks by Eleven members of the Hunt Family, Alcheringa Gallery, Victoria, BC
- 2005 Shine: Adornments of the Northwest Coast, Alcheringa Gallery, Victoria, BC
- 2011 "The Power of Giving: The Potlatch in the Kwakwaka'wakw Big House from the Canadian Northwest Coast", Dresden: Kunsthalle im Lipsiusbau, Exhibition Designer.
- 2015/2016 Olaka Iku Da Nala "It's a Good Day". Coastal Peoples Gallery, Vancouver, BC. Solo Show.

== Honours and awards ==
In 2011, Hunt was awarded the National Aboriginal Achievement Award (now Indspire Awards) for her outstanding career achievement and for serving as a role model to Indigenous youth.

== Books ==
- Olaka Iku Da Nala: It is a Good Day (2012)
