= 2009 World Outgames =

International LGBTQ sporting event

The 2009 World Outgames, the 2nd World Outgames, a sporting and cultural event hosted by the gay community, was hosted by Copenhagen, Denmark from July 25 to August 2, 2009. It was one of the largest international sports and cultural events ever held in Denmark, with 8,000 people from around the world expected to participate. The World Outgames addressed itself primarily, but not exclusively, to the LGBT community. The aim was that, once it was underway, the event would be perceived as relevant and welcoming for all inhabitants of Copenhagen.

== History ==
World Outgames was built on three pillars: sports, culture, and human rights. There were 38 sports athletes to choose from. The budget was approximately 8.2 million euros. Unlike the 2006 World Outgames, the 2009 World Outgames declared a profit.

== Copenhagen Organising Committee ==
- Merethe Stagetorn, Chairman
- Merete Lundbye Moller
- Martin Bender
- Minna Grooss
- Finn Terkelsen
- Ane Skak
- Elizabeth Moller Jensen

== International Conference on LGBT Human Rights ==
The Outgames included the 2nd International Conference on LGBTQ Human Rights from 27 to 29 July. Co-chaired by Rebeca Sevilla and Svend Robinson, the conference included keynote speakers such as John Amaechi, Virginia Apuzzo, Axel Axgil, Georgina Beyer, Michelle Douglas, Cleve Jones, Sunil Babu Pant, Parvez Sharma, Wan Yanhai and Copenhagen Lord Mayor Ritt Bjerregaard. The themes of the conference included human rights and politics, business, workers, culture and media, health, education, sport, family and relationships, and sexuality, pleasure, and body politics.

The conference concluded with the release of the Copenhagen Catalogue of Good Practices, a selection of effective actions for LGBT human rights from around the world.

== See also ==
- Category:LGBTQ sports events

Preceded by 2006 World Outgames	World Outgames; 2009	Succeeded by 2013 World Outgames
