= World Outgames =

Worldwide LGBT sporting event

The World Outgames were a sporting and cultural event hosted by the gay community. The Outgames were open to all who wish to participate, without regard to sexual orientation. There were no qualifying standards, although competitions were arranged according to the skill levels of the competitors. The Outgames brought together athletes and artists from all over the world, many from countries where homosexuality remains illegal and hidden.

The World Outgames were licensed by the Gay and Lesbian International Sport Association. Host cities were democratically selected in a non-transparent process by its members. The Outgames were a separate organization from the Gay Games. After the cancellation of the 4th World Outgames in Miami in 2017, the organization was dissolved.

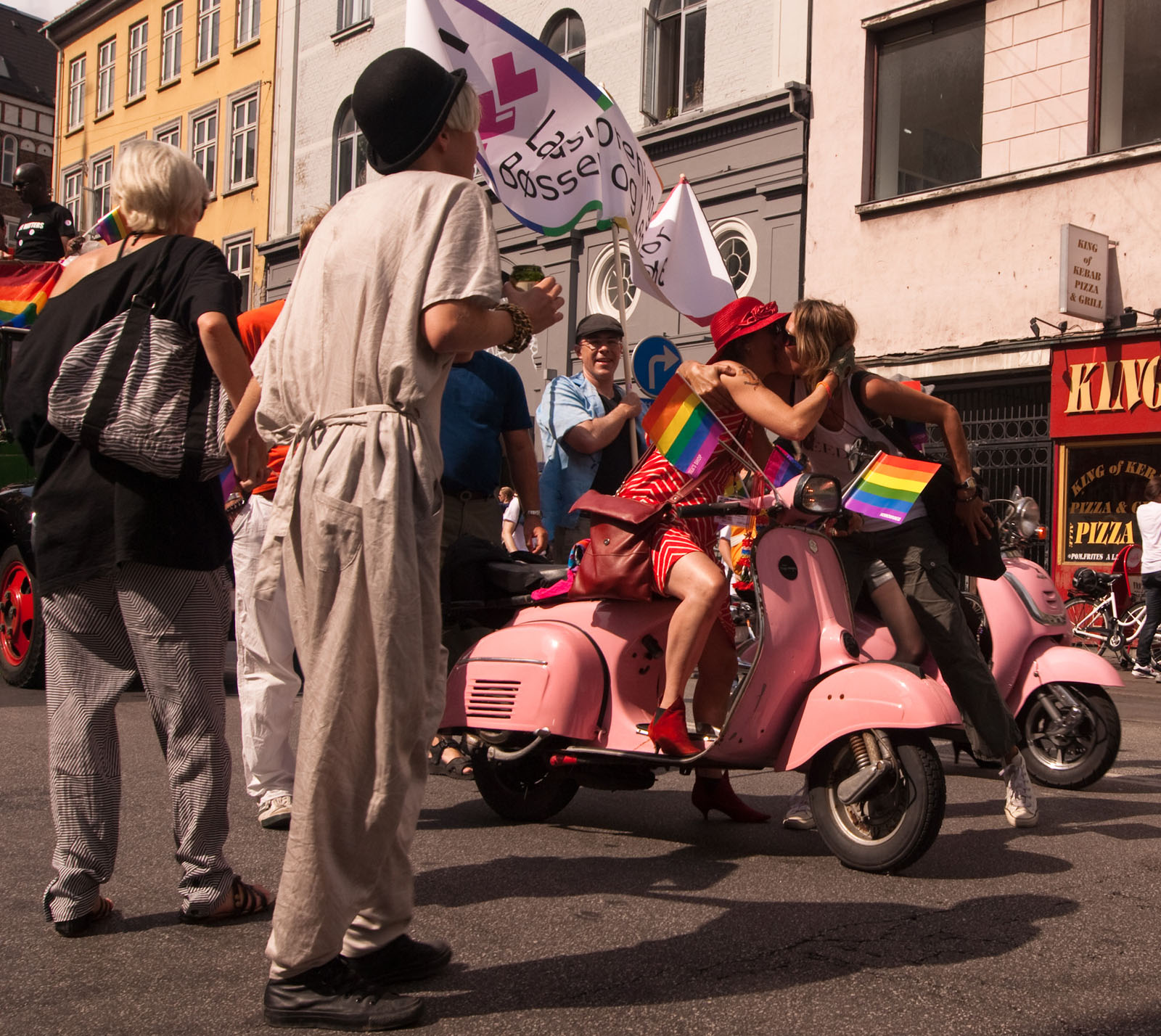
2009 World Outgames held in Copenhagen

== Origins ==
The seventh edition of the Gay Games was supposed to take place in Montreal in 2006, but the Federation of Gay Games (FGG) removed their sanction after it and Montreal 2006 were unable to agree on the size of the games and the demand for external control of the Montreal 2006 budget by the FGG. When Montreal 2006 announced its intention to continue organizing the games without the sanction of the FGG, based on an informal survey sent to several organizations, the Gay Games for 2006 were awarded to Chicago and intentionally setup to compete head to head with the Montreal event. This separation developed into the first edition of the World Outgames, licensed by the Gay and Lesbian International Sport Association, the city of Montreal, the Province of Quebec, the Government of Canada, GlaxoSmithKline, Air Canada, Labatt Brewing Company, Bell Canada, as well as dozens of other national and international businesses and media organisations including the Canadian Broadcasting Corporation.

With 18,599 participants, the 1st World Outgames, held in 2006, was the largest international sports event to be held in Montreal, Quebec, since the 1976 Summer Olympics. These first Outgames were not a financial success on several aspects, although the Government of Quebec announced at $5.3M deficit, the organization ended up with a real deficit of just under $1M. Many suppliers were left unpaid after the various governments refused to cover the debt. The human rights conference was a first and attracted high-profile LGBT activists and professionals from every continent.

== Games ==
Host cities of the World Outgames

Edition	Year	City	Country
1	2006	Montreal (Montréal)	Canada
2	2009	Copenhagen (København)	Denmark
3	2013	Antwerp (Antwerpen)	Belgium
4	2017	Miami Beach (Miami Beach)	United States

=== 1st World Outgames 2006 ===
For the first World Outgames, the organization, and officials from the City of Montreal, the Province of Quebec and the Government of Canada welcomed representatives from 111 countries: 10,248 athletes to participate in games from 29 July to 5 August, alongside 1516 participants for an international conference on lesbian, gay, bisexual and transgender (LGBT) human rights, including Workers Out. Workers Out was the third international gathering of LGBT trade unionists. Approximately 5,200 volunteers worked at the events.

=== 2nd World Outgames 2009 ===
The second edition of World Outgames started in Copenhagen on 25 July and ended on 2 August 2009. The opening ceremony took place at City Hall Square. Major sponsors included SAS, HIVOS, IBM, Wonderful Copenhagen, Gay Times and the EU "For Diversity. Against Discrimination" campaign. 31 out of the 34 sports disciplines were sanctioned by national or international specialist associations, who approved the use of their rules, regulations, and qualified judges and referees. Copenhagen also was the first to come up with the concept of OutCities. The cities of Melbourne, Tel Aviv, Mexico City, Rio de Janeiro, Antwerp and Aarhus each presented a cultural program with a number of their best local artists under the themes of gender, identity and cultural diversity.

=== 3rd World Outgames 2013 ===
The third edition of the World Outgames were held in Antwerp in 2013.

=== 4th World Outgames 2017 ===
The 4th global World OutGames was due to commence on Friday, May 26 and continue through Sunday, June 4, 2017 in Miami, Florida. In a controversial move, the organisers emailed participants in the morning of the 26th to say “It is with deep regret that due to financial challenges, World OutGames must cancel opening and closing ceremonies and sports programming with the exception of aquatics, country western dance and soccer. The Human Rights Conference and cultural programs will continue as planned. We thank everyone who has supported the effort and apologize to those who will be impacted by this difficult decision.” A spokesperson for the city of Miami confirmed that the Miami Police and District Attorney's Office had opened a fraud investigation into the Games.

Competitors, spectators and thought leaders from around the world had been expected to unite for the 10-day World OutGames in Miami featuring more than 450 events across three areas- Sport, Culture and Human Rights. The experience was designed to challenge participants physically, stimulate attendees intellectually and enliven spectators emotionally.

The World OutGames had the support of the Florida Sports Foundation, Greater Miami Convention and Visitors Bureau, City of Miami Beach and Miami Beach Visitor and Convention Authority. However upon cancellation of the event, those organizations scrambled with the affected athletes to organize makeshift events.

World OutGames Miami 2017 was licensed by the Gay and Lesbian International Sport Association.

==== Sports ====
Hundreds of athletes were to arrive at the World OutGames Miami to participate in more than 35 sports across Miami-Dade and South Florida. All sports with the exception of aquatics, soccer and country/western dance were abruptly cancelled on the first day of the event. Many athletes had just arrived to the news and felt lied to in response that they invested hundreds or thousands of dollars to travel for their sports competition that would never take place. Events were to include badminton, basketball, beach volleyball, billiards, bodybuilding, bridge, cheerleading, chess, country–western dance, cycling, dance, darts, diving, dominoes, field hockey, flag football, golf, indoor volleyball, martial arts, netball, poker, rowing, rugby, running (5k, 10K, half- and full-marathon), soccer, softball, swimming, synchronized swimming, table tennis, track & field, triathlon, water polo and wrestling.

Following the official cancellation of the Sports program, many athletes came together on their own to organize makeshift sporting events with the assistance of the local LGBTQ community in Miami, the City of Miami Beach and other municipalities. Many sports including track and field, basketball, tennis, volleyball and bodybuilding did have a competition, with no help or support from Outgames Miami or GLISA.

Other sports including 5k, 10k, half/full marathon, cycling and triathlon were cancelled due to non-payment from Outgames Miami to the production companies hired to organize the events.

Aquatics, soccer and country–western dance were not cancelled as those events were organized as a separate event outside of Outgames Miami and GLISA's responsibility. The International Gay and Lesbian Aquatics Association and the International Gay and Lesbian Football Association organized their respective sports as a part of their annual championships and thus kept Outgames Miami at an arms-length in the organization to ensure a successful tournament without Outgames Miami's participation.

==== Culture ====
Various cultural happenings had been planned over the 10-day long event, including opening and closing ceremonies (which were cancelled less than 24 hours before the start of the opening ceremony); live entertainment and concerts; art exhibits; band competitions; choir competitions; community events; and a film festival. The cultural events went on as scheduled despite the cancellation of the sports programs, however many athletes did not take part as they were cleaning up what was left of their sport. The events were primarily attended by members of GLISA board.

==== Human rights ====
The World OutGames 4th Global Human Rights Conference took place May 26 through May 28, 2017, with three tracks promoting Inclusivity in Sports, Health & Wellness and Global Social Justice.

The Human Rights Conference was very poorly attended. Many speakers came expecting hundreds of attendees but arrived to only a few, and turned their presentations into round table discussions.

==== Attendance ====
More than 15,000 participants were expected at the World OutGames in Miami but only 2000 participants registered, including fewer than 2,000 athletes. In addition, the games expected 145,000 paid and free general admission ticketed spectators over the course of the 10-day event.

==== Economic impact ====
The economic impact for Miami had been predicted to be $120 million. However Outgames Miami is under investigation for financial fraud and embezzlement due to their sudden cancellation of the Sports program and significantly lower than expected turnout.

== Schism in LGBT sports communities over 2006 LGBT sport event ==
In 2001, the bidding organization from Montreal, won the right to negotiate with Federation of Gay Games (FGG) for a licensing agreement to host the 2006 Gay Games, but after two years of failed negotiations FGG members rejected a proposal agreed to by the negotiating committee during the 2003 FGG annual meeting in Chicago. There were three main points of contention, over which neither party could agree:

- Size of the event
- Size of the budget — especially the planned break-even participation point
- Financial transparency and control

In a weakening global economy following international terrorist attacks, including 9/11, the FGG wanted Montreal to be able to plan for a successful Gay Games even if participation did not meet Montreal's optimistic projection of 24,000 participants, twice the level of participation of the previous Gay Games in 2002. Due to financial problems in previous events, the FGG also asked for control over Montreal 2006's financial activities, however the FGG did not want to reduce their nearly $1M in licensing rights to help alleviate the financial pressure on the organizing committee. In the end, the board of the FGG decided to allow a mere 12 minutes to present a 400-page agreement which in the end was not even allowed to be voted on by the FGG members. After two years of negotiation and with a shrinking timeline, Montreal decided to establish a deadline to reach an agreement. After the failed negotiations the FGG held a second round of bidding in which Chicago and Los Angeles bidders, who had put forth bids to host the 2006 games in the first round along with Montreal and Atlanta, chose to bid. The FGG awarded Gay Games VII to Chicago Games, Inc.

Based on a survey LGBT sports enthusiasts and the support of several financial partners, the Montreal organizing committee decided to proceed to hold an athletic and cultural event, with a human rights conference, without the sanction of the FGG. This plan developed into the first edition of the World Outgames, and the creation of its sanctioning body, the Gay and Lesbian International Sport Association.

Due to the close timing of 1st World Outgames and the 7th edition of the Gay Games, many individual and team participants were forced to choose between Gay Games Chicago and World Outgames Montreal, a situation exacerbated by the two events being a week apart. The closing ceremony of Gay Games Chicago on 22 July 2006 was only 7 days before the opening ceremony of World Outgames Montreal on 29 July 2006. This meant that those who competed or performed in Chicago would have little recovery time before Montreal. The split resulted in a lower quality of athletic competition at both events because neither could claim the whole field of competitors. Team and individual sports were hurt alike. Few teams were able to field complete squads for both events; In wrestling, 100 wrestlers competed in Chicago (comparable to previous Gay Games), but only 22 competed in Montreal, by far the lowest number for any major international tournament. On the other hand, certain sports that had never had a chance to be presented in Gay Games were presented in Montreal and participants were very satisfied with the opportunity to compete. There was some advantages to the games being so close together time wise and location wise. For some overseas participants who had to travel far, the convenience of the two events being only a week apart and not far from each other enabled them to attend both. Many did not attend at all. After Chicago drew approximately 12,000 participants, Montreal 10,248 athletes, 1,516 Conference Attendees and 835 people to the cultural component of the games. Organizers later recognized that if only one option would have been presented, Montreal's goal of 24,000 participants could have become a reality.

Since 2006, the need for a secondary global multi-sport event has been the subject of much debate, especially after the final financial figures for 2006, 2009, 2013 Outgames were released (still waiting on the results of the fraud investigation from Miami 2017). The Chicago Gay Games VII ended with no debt and all bills paid. In contrast, the Montreal World Outgames ended with more than $5M (Canadian dollars) of debt.

== See also ==
- Outgames
- North American Outgames
- Gay Games / Federation of Gay Games
- EuroGames ( European Gay and Lesbian Multi-Sports Championships ) / European Gay and Lesbian Sport Federation
- Europride
- Principle 6 campaign
