= 2006 World Outgames =

International LGBTQ sporting event

The 1st World Outgames took place in Montréal, Quebec, Canada from July 26, 2006, to August 5, 2006. The international conference was held from July 26 to the 29. The sporting events were held from July 29 to August 5.

== History ==
The event evolved out of a dispute concerning spending for the 2006 Gay Games (formally called Gay Games VII), which Montréal had been awarded. However, the Gay Games sanctioners (Federation of Gay Games) and Montréal 2006 quarrelled over the budget and scale of the Games and the amount of control each party would exercise; subsequently, the FGG parted company with Montréal, awarding the games to Chicago.

It was the second major multi-sport sporting event that Montréal had hosted since the Montréal Olympics in 1976. It used facilities from the Olympics and those from the 2005 World Aquatic Championships, the previous major multi-sport event in Montréal. The Outgames Montréal 2006 were larger than the 2006 Gay Games in number of events and amount spent but not in the number of participants.

Unlike the Gay Games, the 1st World Outgames also included non-sport events, such as a Country-Western Dance competition (as well as exhibitions) and a Choral Festival that also had a competitive component.

The event was held concurrently with Divers/Cité, the city's primary LGBT pride festival. The increased number of LGBT tourists in town for the Outgames had been expected to be a financial boon for Divers/Cité, but ironically that festival's attendance and revenues actually declined from previous years. According to Divers/Cité director Suzanne Girard, "even if there were more people than usual, there were 10,000 more things to do." Later in the year, as a result of the financial impacts of the Outgames, Divers/Cité dropped its pride programming and repositioned itself as an arts and music festival, leading to the creation of the new Fierté Montréal to take over as the city's pride festival.

A Quebec government audit revealed a CAD 5.3 million deficit for the 2006 Outgames on a CAD 15 million total budget on November 13, 2006. On December 7, 2006, Outgames Montréal 2006 filed for bankruptcy protection. Of the deficit, CAD 3.1 million was in loans from the governments of Montréal and Quebec, while the other CAD 2.2 million was due to private companies and individuals.

== Organizing committee ==
- Mark Tewksbury, co-president
- Marielle Dupéré, co-president
- Paul Uline, Secretary
- François Goulet, Director
- Marie-Josée Malo, Director
- Johanne Roy, Director
- Pierre Côté, Director

== International Conference on LGBT Human Rights ==
The Outgames Montréal 2006 included an International Conference on LGBT Human Rights immediately prior to the games themselves, from July 26 to July 29. With attendance of some 2,000 participants, it was the largest conference on LGBT rights ever held.

The four-day conference consisted of five plenary sessions on the United States and Canada, Africa and the Arab World, Latin America, Asia and the Pacific, and Europe, in addition to the opening and closing sessions. Keynote speakers included Gérald Tremblay, Gene Robinson, Mark Tewksbury, Irshad Manji, Mariela Castro, Georgina Beyer, Waheed Alli, Martin Cauchon, Li Yinhe and Martina Navratilova.

Louise Arbour, UN High Commissioner for Human Rights, delivered an especially well-received speech at the opening dinner, which gave particular encouragement to the conference's goal of recognition at the United Nations.

There were also more than a hundred workshops on more specific themes, as well as programmes of workshops on sport, business, and international affairs.

The conference concluded with the issuance of the Declaration of Montréal on LGBT Human Rights, a declaration that will be submitted to the United Nations.

== Opening ceremonies ==
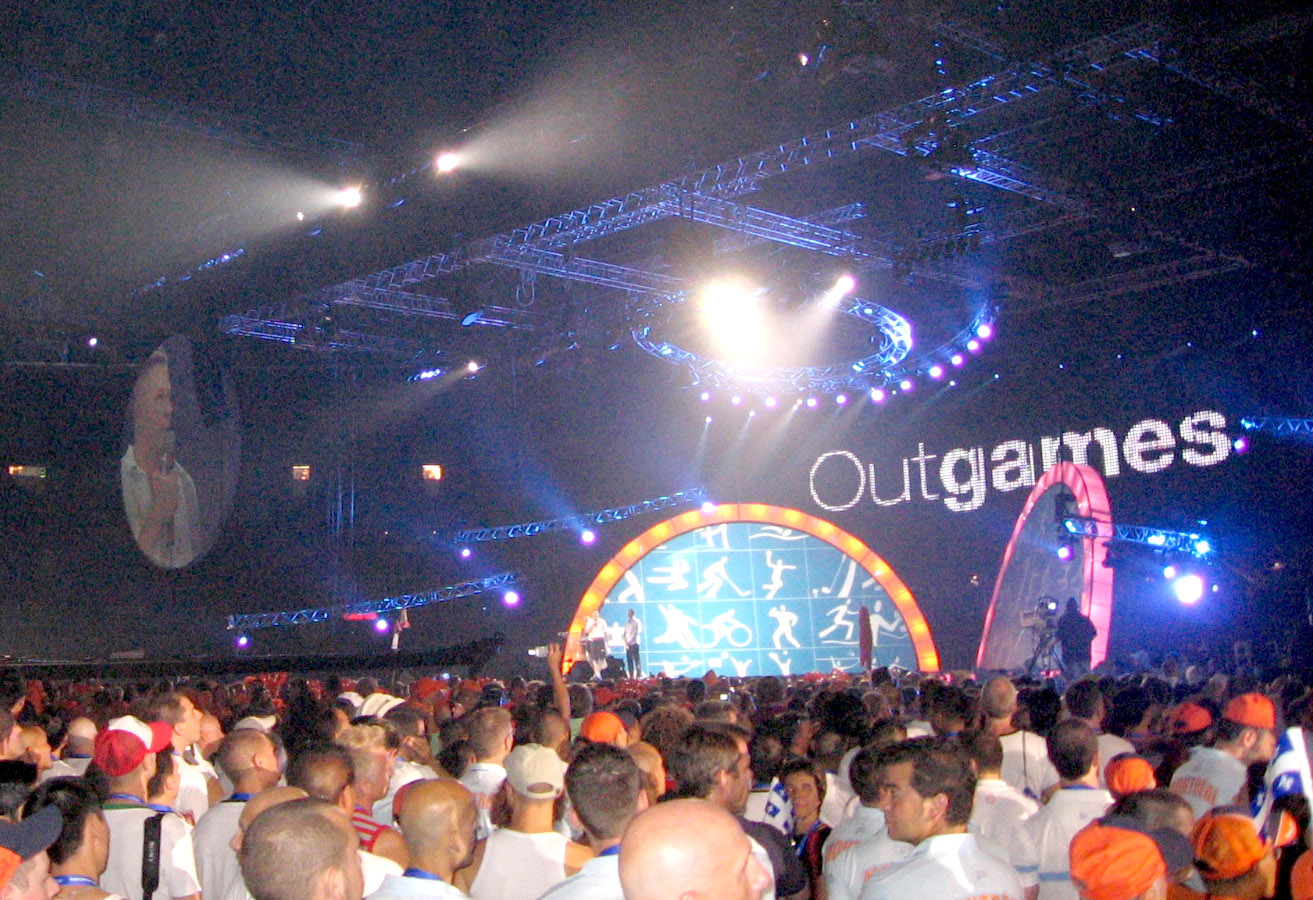
Opening ceremonies of the 2006 World Outgames

Opening ceremonies for the 1st Outgames Montréal 2006 were held at the Olympic Stadium on Saturday, July 29, 2006. The performance was broadcast by Radio-Canada, Canada's national French-language public broadcaster.

After the parade of nations, the Declaration of Montréal was read by Mark Tewksbury and Martina Navratilova. Gérald Tremblay, Mayor of Montréal, Line Beauchamp, Quebec Minister of Culture, and Michael Fortier, federal Minister of Public Works, represented the three levels of government; Fortier was loudly booed, reflecting anger among the LGBT community regarding the Conservative government's stances on gay rights, including the announcement of a motion to reopen debate on the Civil Marriage Act and same-sex marriage in Canada.

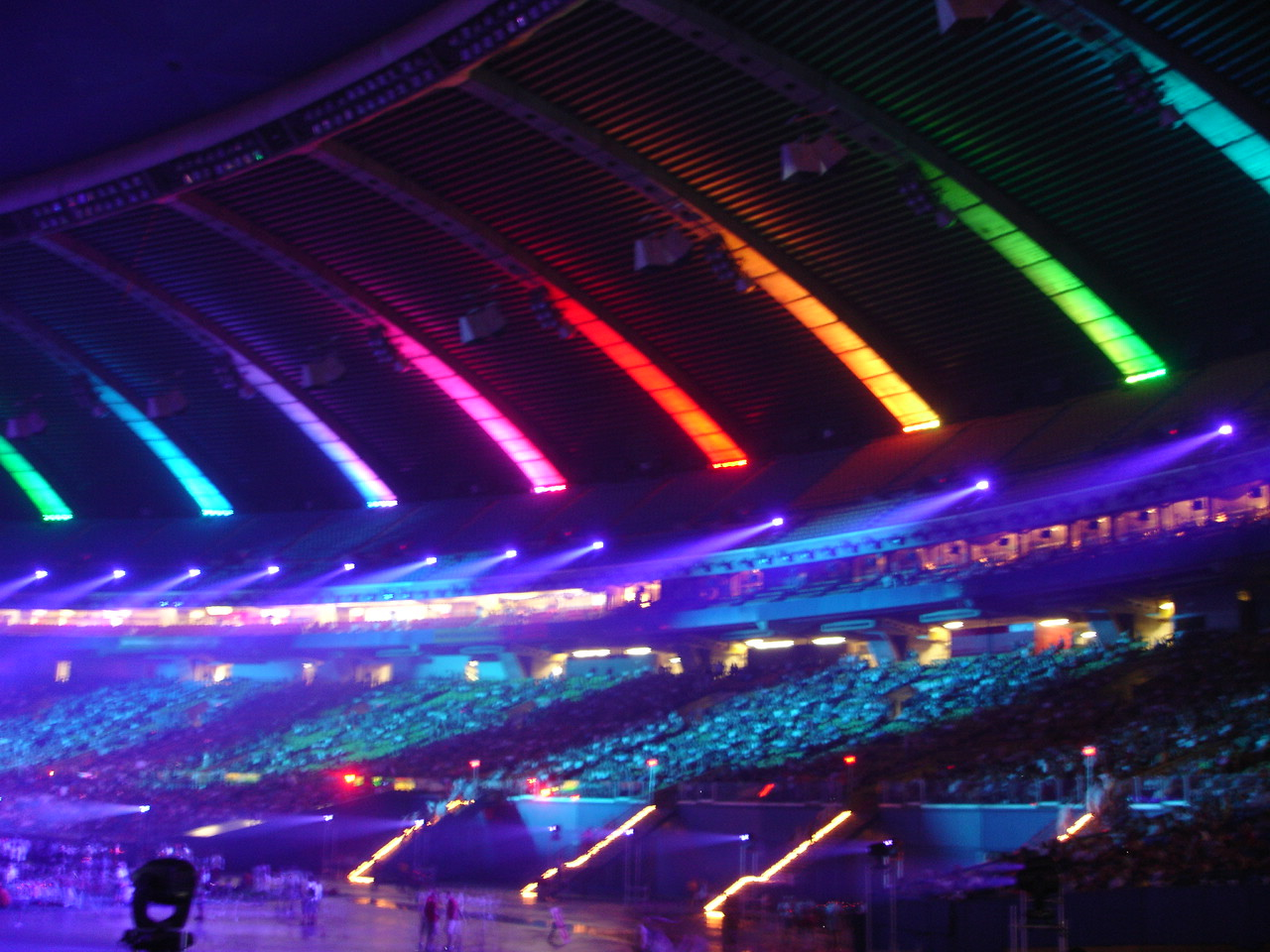
Lights at the Olympic Stadium, Outgames Opening, click to enlarge

After the athletes' and officials' oath were taken by Charles Boyer and Diane Bandy respectively, Mayor Tremblay officially declared the Outgames open.

Using the theme of "the circle", the concept of the show integrated music, song, dance, choruses, mass choreography and performances by the Cirque du Soleil.

Artists who performed at the opening ceremonies included:

- k.d. lang
- Martha Wash
- Deborah Cox
- Jonas
- Sylvie Desgroseilliers
- Diane Dufresne
- Cirque du Soleil

== Venues ==
Over 50 venues in Montréal hosted events for the 1st World Outgames. Three main areas gathered most of the activities, the largest being the Claude Robillard Sports Complex, in addition to the Montréal Olympic Park and the Jean Drapeau Park. The Outgames used most of the venues built for the Montréal Summer Olympics of 1976. Other venues included the Golf Metropolitain Anjou for golfing, the Parc du Domaine Vert à Mirabel for mountain biking, the Little Italy neighbourhood for the road cycling criterium, as well as various parks across the city for sports such as soccer, tennis, and softball.

The Choral Festival took place at Salle Pierre Mercure from Tuesday, August 1, 2006, through Thursday, August 3, 2006.

The main social and entertainment location for non-sporting events during the Outgames Montréal 2006 was located at the west side of Viger Square.

== 35 Sporting events contested including ==
- Rowing
- Aerobics
- Billiards
- Badminton
- Dragon boat regatta
- Table tennis
- Figure skating
- Tennis
- Golf
- Track and field
- Handball
- Triathlon
- Ice hockey
- Volleyball
- Karate
- Water polo
- Marathon
- Wrestling
- Physique
- Bowling
- Outsplash

== Participating teams ==
- English Bay Triathlon Club
- Team Vancouver
- Team Frankfurt a. M.
- Tangra, Bulgaria
- Melbourne Spikers Volleyball, Australia
- Team Colorado
- Melbourne Argonauts Queer Rowing Club, Australia
- Equipe San Francisco, California, United States
- London Spikers Volleyball Club, London, UK

== Results ==
Official results from the Outgames Montréal 2006 website are no longer available as it shut down from post-game financial difficulties.
Sport	Category	First place (gold)	Second place (silver)	Third place (bronze)
Badminton	Doubles A Men	Andersen-Entzel (Denmark)	Green-Hew (Great Britain)	Wilmet-Scrivener (Belgium)
	Doubles A Mixed	Green-Fabrie (Great Britain)	Teoh-Wincure (United States)	Lanotte-Wilmet (Belgium)
	Doubles A Women	Whelan-Julien (Canada)	Vernerfelt-Tidy (Great Britain)	Gomez-Teoh (United States)
	Singles A Men	Pethebridge, Craig (Australia)	Andersen, Thomas (Denmark)	Wilmet, Olivier (Belgium)
	Singles A Women	Vernerfelt, Rikke (Great Britain)	Anonymous (Canada)	Binnes, Simone (Germany)
Basketball	Men	London Cruisers (Great Britain)	PARIS Gars 2 (France)	Gaipard (Canada)
	Women	Windsor (Canada)	Montréal Bounce (Canada)	Half Fatal Attraction (Netherlands)
Dragon Boat Regatta	Mixed (500 m)	Aido Hwedo (Canada)	Kraken (Canada)	Out Dragon (Canada)
Marathon	Men	? (?)	? (?)	Stephen Souch (Canada)

== 15 participating ensembles in the Choral Festival ==
- Ensemble Vocal Ganymède (Men's Choir from Montreal, Canada) / Director: Yvan Sabourin / Pianist: Dominic Lupien
- Mélo'Men (Men's Choir from Paris, France) / Director: John Dawkins / Pianist: Michel Simard
- Colla Voce (Men's Choir from San Francisco, U.S.) / Director: Steve Ng / Pianist: Doug McGrath
- Ensemble Vocal Extravaganza (Mixed Choir from Montreal, Canada) / Director: François Monette / Pianist: Daphnée Boisvert
- Mélo'Singers (Men's Choir from Paris, France) / Director: John Dawkins / Pianist: Michel Simard
- Sydney Gay & Lesbian Choir (Mixed Choir from Sydney, Australia) / Director: Sarah Penicka / Pianist: Gareth Chan
- Manchester Lesbian & Gay Chorus (Mixed Choir from Manchester, England) / Director: Jeff Borradaile
- Choeur Gai de Montréal (Men's Choir from Montreal, Canada) / Director: François Monette
- Gay Asian Pacific Alliance Men's Chorus (GAPA) (Men's Choir from San Francisco, U.S.) / Director: Randall Kikukawa / Pianist: Desmond Tan
- Combined Gay & Lesbian Choir of Australasia (Mixed Choir from Melbourne and Sydney, Australia; and Auckland, New Zealand) / Director: Jonathon Welch
- Mexico Folklorigay* (Dance Company from Mexico)
- Rainbow Symphony Orchestra* (Orchestra from Paris, France) / Director: John Dawkins / Soloist: Sonia Sasseville, contralto
- Women's International Choir** / Director: Andrée Dagenais / Pianist: Nathalie Bellerive
- Men's International Choir** / Director: John Dawkins / Pianist: Michel Simard
- Mixed International Choir** / Director: Jeff Buhrman / Pianist: Michel Simard / Violinist: Don Dimmitt

*Closing night concert only (non-competitive)

**Consisting of singers from the 10 participating choruses, closing night concert only (non-competitive)

== Members of the jury ==
- Ms. Patricia Abbott, executive director, Association of Canadian Choral Conductors
- Mr. Martin Dagenais, Choral Director
- Mr. Jean-Sébastion Vallée, Choral Director

== Choral Festival results ==
Registration information and all subsequent printed materials for the Choral Festival indicated that Gold, Silver and Bronze Medals would be awarded to the top ensembles in three categories: Large Chorus, Medium Chorus, and Small Chorus (determined by the number of singers). However, at the Medal Presentations on Thursday, August 3, the following achievements were announced:

- 1st Place Gold Medalists: Mélo'Men (a Medium Chorus)
- 2nd Place Silver Medalists: Ensemble Vocal Ganymède (a Large Chorus)
- 3rd Place Bronze Medalists: Mélo'Singers (a Large Chorus)
- Honorable Mention (no medals): Colla Voce (a Small Chorus)

Under the award decisions as published, Ensemble Vocal Ganymède should have been awarded the gold medal for Large Chorus; Mélo'Singers the silver medal for Large Chorus; and Colla Voce the gold medal for Small Chorus. The participating groups were not apprised of the change in rules in advance (or at any time), and when asked for an explanation after the ceremony, the organizers said the cost of so many medals would have been too prohibitive.

== See also ==
- World Outgames
- Gay and Lesbian International Sport Association (GLISA)
- European Gay and Lesbian Sport Federation (EGLSF)
- European Gay and Lesbian Multi-Sports Championships (EuroGames)
- 2006 Gay Games / Gay Games / Federation of Gay Games
- XVI International AIDS Conference, 2006

Preceded by none	World Outgames; 2006	Succeeded by 2009 World Outgames (Copenhagen, Denmark)
