= European Gay and Lesbian Sport Federation =

European LBTQ sports governing body

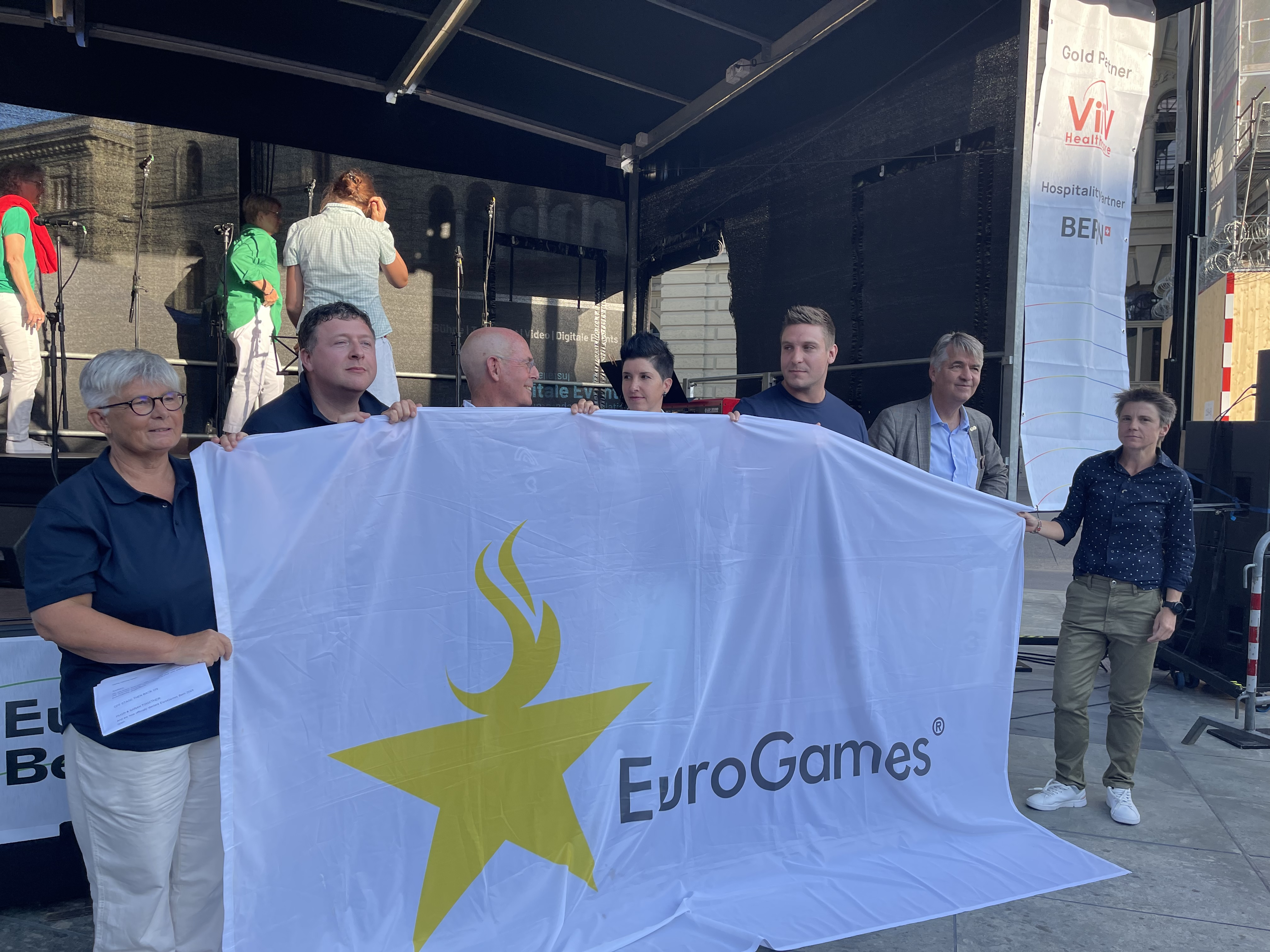
- EGLSF at the EuroGames Bern 2023 opening ceremony
- Formation: 1989
- Type: Sports governing body
- Headquarters: Amsterdam, Netherlands
- Region served: Europe
- Field: LGBTQ+ sports
- Website: www.eglsf.info

The European Gay and Lesbian Sport Federation (EGLSF) is a sporting body in Europe. It was founded by West German and Dutch LGBTQ sport clubs in 1989 after being inspired by the first Gay Games in San Francisco, and has since expanded in scope to cover the broader LGBTQ+ athletic community. Its headquarters are in Amsterdam, The Netherlands. Today, EGLSF has more than a hundred LGBT sport clubs from all over Europe as members, representing more than 20.000 European athletes.

Since 1992, the EGLSF celebrates a European gay sport event once a year: the EuroGames, the European Gay & Lesbian Championships. There are two levels of EuroGames: large-scale EuroGames which are held every 4 years and small-scale EuroGames which are held annually.

== See also ==
- World Outgames / Gay and Lesbian International Sport Association
- Gay Games / Federation of Gay Games
- Principle 6 campaign
