= Declaration of Montreal =

LGBTQ rights document

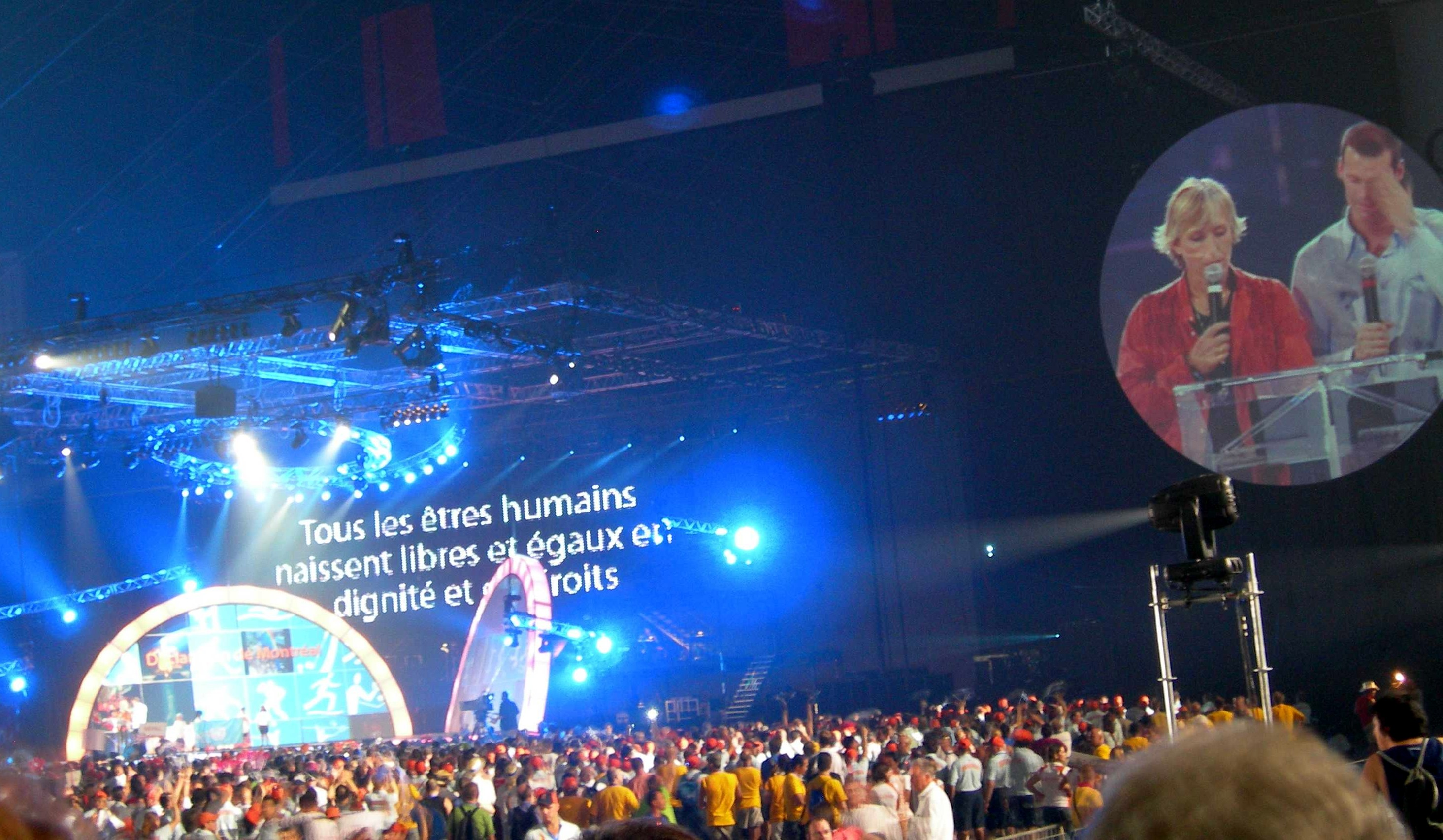
Martina Navratilova and Mark Tewksbury read the Declaration of Montreal at the opening ceremonies of the World Outgames.

The Declaration of Montreal on Lesbian, Gay, Bisexual, and Transgender Human Rights is a document adopted in Montreal, Quebec, Canada, on July 29, 2006, by the International Conference on LGBT Human Rights which formed part of the first World Outgames. The Declaration outlines a number of rights and freedoms pertaining to LGBT and intersex people that it is proposed be universally guaranteed. It encompasses all aspects of human rights, from the guarantee of fundamental freedoms to the prevention of discrimination against LGBT people in healthcare, education and immigration. The Declaration also addresses various issues that impinge on the global promotion of LGBT rights and intersex human rights. Intended as a starting point in listing the demands of the international LGBT movement, it will ultimately be submitted to the United Nations.

== Background ==
The Conference aimed to raise the international community's awareness of LGBT rights issues. It was held immediately prior to the Outgames themselves and attended by almost 2000 delegates and 600 conference speakers from across the world, making it the largest LGBT rights conference ever held. A number of international experts took part including distinguished jurists, academics, church leaders and human rights activists. Among them was Joke Swiebel a former member of the European Parliament, who served as one of the primary drafters of the Declaration. The delegates unanimously approved the Declaration.

Among the keynote speakers to the Conference were:

- Louise Arbour – United Nations High Commissioner for Human Rights
- Gene Robinson – Bishop of the Diocese of New Hampshire in the Episcopal Church in the United States of America
- Claire L'Heureux-Dubé – Former justice on the Supreme Court of Canada
- Mark Tewksbury – Canadian swimmer and Olympic gold medalist
- Irshad Manji – Canadian author, journalist, and activist
- Georgina Beyer – New Zealand politician, the world's first openly transgender Member of Parliament
- Waheed Alli – Asian businessman and United Kingdom life peer
- Martina Navratilova – Former world No. 1 tennis player
- Gérald Tremblay – Mayor of Montreal

The Declaration aims to address UN failings in consistently applying its Universal Declaration of Human Rights. A number of fundamental freedoms, including the right to life, are violated in a number of member countries where homosexuality is criminalised. Homosexual acts are punishable by death in nine jurisdictions: Afghanistan, Iran, Nigeria, Mauritania, Pakistan, Saudi Arabia, Sudan and Yemen. They remain illegal in 72 countries, and are in many cases punishable by imprisonment or corporal punishment.

== Essential rights ==
The Convention identifies several areas in which action needs to be taken to uphold the essential rights of LGBT people: "A world where LGBT rights are systematically violated, is a world where nobody can feel safe and free" referring to the principle of World Conference on Human Rights held in Vienna affirming that "All human rights are universal, indivisible, and interdependent and interrelated."

=== Protection against state and private violence ===
The declaration calls for an end to the death penalty and all violence against LGBT people whether state condoned or by private parties. States are required to take steps to protect LGBT people from all hate crimes. Forced marriages to persons of the opposite sex are identified as particular human rights violations to be combated.

Finally, violence against intersex people, in particular unnecessary surgery to force conformity to rigid models of sexual characteristics, is condemned as well as genital surgery to them unless they are old enough to understand it and consent to it. This gave influence to Principle 18 (protection from medical abuse) of The Yogyakarta Principles.

=== Freedom of expression, assembly and association ===
Laws which discriminate against LGBT people, such as bans of pride marches, LGBT journalism and registration of non-governmental organisations, are identified as a major stumbling blocks in campaigning for LGBT rights issues. The world community is therefore called upon to guarantee such rights and prevent their being denied by hostile public authorities.

In addition, the international community is asked to take positive steps in promoting such rights. To this end, the Declaration calls for international development aid packages to be conditional on improvements in respecting human rights, including those of LGBT people. Financial aid is sought for groups campaigning for LGBT rights in areas where such people still fear for their lives or personal safety.

=== Freedom to engage in consensual same-sex sexual activity ===
The repeal of all laws preventing consensual same-sex activity is called for.

== Freedom from discrimination ==
LGBT people face discrimination in many aspects of their lives. Governments are called upon to take positive actions to promote LGBT rights to freedom from discrimination in the following areas:

=== Asylum and immigration rights ===
The United Nations High Commissioner for Refugees recognises a right to asylum for those fleeing persecution based on sexual orientation or gender identity. All countries are called upon to do the same. In addition, rights of residence for foreign partners are demanded to be free from discrimination against LGBT people.

=== Family rights ===
Families are stated to be the most important part of many people's lives. The Declaration requires marriages to be opened up to same-sex couples, all unmarried couples to have similar partnership rights and ensuring equal access for all to every option for parenthood, including adoptions by LGBT people.

=== Education healthcare, media and employment ===
In education, classes on LGBT human rights are sought and schools are required to take action against homophobic bullying. The media are called upon to assist in breaking down stereotypes and to portray LGBT people in a realistic manner. The necessity of access to health care in general and for the specific needs of LGBT people is stressed. In particular funding for sex reassignment surgery is expected to be provided to the same extent that it is for other medically necessary treatments. Finally, religious groups are encouraged to be tolerant towards LGBT people.

=== Employment ===
The Declaration calls for the development of programmes to promote fair chances in employment and business for LGBT people for their economic independence and self-esteem to be insured. Governments are asked to lead by example in eliminating such discrimination and in promoting the equality and safety of LGBT people in public sector workplaces and trade unions.

== Global issues in promoting LGBT rights ==
To promote LGBT rights globally, the Declaration requires the international community to engage in a worldwide information campaign and calls upon like-minded NGOs and governments to assist in preparing and running such a campaign. Part of this campaign would be to provide education about the prevention and treatment of HIV and AIDS among LGBT people and governments are generally encouraged to include LGBT people in their fight against HIV and AIDS.

The failure of the United Nations to recognise LGBT rights as human rights is condemned, despite the case law Toonen v. Australia by the United Nations Human Rights Committee. It is requested that the new UN Human Rights Council adopt LGBT rights as part of its agenda and that the International Gay and Lesbian Association and other LGBT rights organisations be amongst the NGOs that are able to consult with the Council. And at last, the Declaration calls on all nations in the world and United Nations to recognize and promote the 17th of May of each year as the International Day Against Homophobia and Transphobia.

== Implementation ==
The Montreal borough of Ville-Marie was the first elected body in the world to officially adopt the Declaration in on August 1, 2006, whilst the New Democratic Party became the first political party to do so, by a unanimous vote of its federal convention on September 10, 2006. Accordingly, the NDP's critic for LGBT rights, Bill Siksay, presented a motion in the House of Commons of Canada calling on the Canadian government to abide by the Declaration on September 20, 2006.

The Declaration has also been adopted by the City councils of:

- Montreal, Canada
- Barcelona, Spain
- San Francisco, United States
- Denver, United States
- Sydney, Australia

== See also ==
- LGBT rights
- LGBT social movements
- Homosexuality laws of the world
- Violence against LGBT people
- Hate crime
- Healthcare and the LGBT community
- Same-sex marriage
- Toonen v. Australia
- LGBT adoption
- Legal status of transgender people
- The Yogyakarta Principles
