= 2006 Gay Games =

LGBT multi-sport event in Chicago, Illinois, US

VII Gay Games Chicago 2006
- Games logo
- Host city: Chicago
- Country: United States
- Motto: Where the World Meets
- Nations: 70
- Athletes: 11,500
- Events: 30 sports
- Opening: July 15, 2006
- Closing: July 22, 2006
- Main venue: Soldier Field (Opening Ceremony) and Wrigley Field (Closing Ceremony)

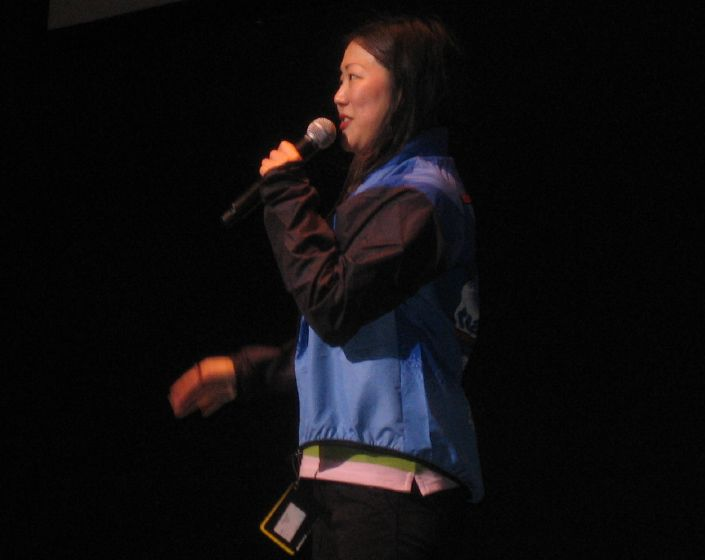
Comedian Margaret Cho performing at the games

The 2006 Gay Games (Gay Games VII), colloquially called the Chicago Gaymes, was part of a family of international sports and cultural festivals called Gay Games, sanctioned by the Federation of Gay Games and organized by the gay, lesbian, bisexual, transgender community of the host city of Chicago, Illinois in the United States. The competition took place July 15– July 22, 2006. The official Gay Games VII slogan was "Where the World Meets."

Actual athletic events were played in venues scattered throughout Chicago and its suburbs, all participating in the Gay Games through special permissive votes in their respective town or village councils. Cultural events included concerts and performances by Cyndi Lauper, Margaret Cho, Megan Mullally, and others added to the festival's feel and charm. Contemporary artists also provided exhibitions as part of the Gay Games.

Corporate sponsorship was key in planning Gay Games VII, garnering support for global advertising from large companies like Absolut Vodka, American Airlines, Ernst & Young, Fleishman-Hillard and Walgreens. Media relationships were created with the Chicago Sun-Times, The New York Times, ChicagoPride.com and the National Broadcasting Company. Advocacy groups like the Human Rights Campaign offered substantial funding for the event, as well.

== Bidding process ==
Four cities submitted bids. Los Angeles, Chicago, Atlanta and Montreal. The decision was made September 2001 in Johannesburg, South Africa.

This was Chicago's first time bidding for the Gay Games. Chicago, Atlanta and Los Angeles provided opportunities for the Gay Games to return to the United States for the first time since the 1994 Gay Games in New York City.

Chicago's bid team published a 100-page brochure to impress the selection committee. Chicago's bid promised for "a celebration--a multiethnic, spirited family reunion of sorts". Ideas presented included dying the Chicago River rainbow in celebration of gay pride.

Chicago's bid placed an emphasis on Chicago's status as a hub of international travel.

Chicago's bid was backed by several corporate sponsors, including Miller Brewing Company, United Airlines and Third Coast Marketing.

Chicago's bid planned to feature 30 athletic contests. These included basketball, beach volleyball, flag football, golf, ice hockey, bodybuilding, rugby, soccer, swimming and diving, a variety of track and field events including a marathon, ballroom dancing and figure skating.

Proposed venues in Chicago's bid included Soldier Field (opening and closing ceremonies), McCormick Place (volleyball, wrestling, and martial arts), Northwestern University (diving), and the UIC Pavilion (figure skating). Events were also planned to be held at the yet-completed Millennium Park.

Chicago had planned to host 20,000 participants and 250,000 spectators in its 2001 bid for the games.

=== Games awarded to Montreal ===
The seventh edition of the Gay Games had been awarded to Montreal, Canada, in 2006, but the Federation of Gay Games (FGG) removed its sanction after differences arose between it and the Montréal 2006 organizing committee. For more information on the change of host cities, see the Schism in LGBT sports communities over Gay Games VII section of the Gay Games article.

Reasons for Montreal's selection over Chicago and the other bidding cities included guarantees for government funding, U.S. ban on HIV-positive foreign tourist, and the relative affordability of Canada.

=== Reopened bidding ===
After Montreal lost the right to host the Gay Games, Chicago, Atlanta, and LA were invited to submit a re-worked version of their earlier bids. LA and Chicago bid in late January 2004, but Chicago won the right to host the games by March 2004. Three weeks later Chicago had signed the licensing agreement for the game.

A downsized Chicago 2006 group had already been meeting with plans to bid for a future Gay Games before these games became reopened to bid on. Chicago's re-submitted bid, in comparison to their original 2001 bid, had a downsized budget, was more focused on the central sports and cultural components of the game, put emphasis on safer revenue, and also proposed a more volunteer-organized event.

== Organization ==
The games were organized by Chicago Games Inc. Due to the change in host cities, the games were planned in only a one-and-a-half year period.

The host committee encountered some difficulty in securing a rowing venue in suburban Crystal Lake, Illinois. There was local opposition to the prospect of the community hosting the LGBTQ sporting event. As a result, the suburb's park board rejected the host committees application to host their rowing competitions in the village. However, a week after rejecting the proposal, the park board reversed their decision in a 3-2 vote, granted the Chicago Games Inc. approval to host their rowing competitions in Crystal Lake.

=== Finances ===
The 2006 Gay Games, which were attended by an estimated 150,000 spectators and featured over 12,000 athletic and cultural participants, became the first edition of the Gay Games in over 20 years to turn a profit. The Chicago Games organizers managed to break even and create a meager profit. In contrast, the Montreal OutGames reportedly lost US$4 million. The financial success of the Chicago games was announced a year after the close of the games. According to Kevin Boyer, the co-vice chair of Chicago Games Inc., the final total cash budget of the 2006 games was slightly over US$9 million. He reported that there were an additional, "$13.2 million in barter and in-kind sponsorships which included, among other categories, media and marketing ($7.2 million), legal service, cash handling, technology consulting, and waived facility rentals." The state of Illinois provided a 1.4% of the cash budget through a $125,000 tourism grant. CGI managed to fill a budget gap of approximately $300,000 (3% of the cash budget). According to Boyer, this was accomplished, "with additional fundraising from donors and sponsors, especially longtime Gay Games competitors and supporters Dick Uyvari and Joe LaPat, as well as negotiated reductions in expenses with some of our vendors." Boyer added that CGI, "also continued to aggressively pursue post-Gay Games revenue from DVD, photo, and merchandise sales as well as the sale of hard assets such as furniture, technology, and equipment."

Seven months prior to the opening of the games, organizers had already secured 6,000 paid registrants and accumulated the first pre-Games financial surplus in the history of the Gay Games.

=== Travel ===
The U.S. is one of the few countries in the world to deny entry to visitors infected with HIV, a condition which causes AIDS. The Federal government ruled that non-United States citizens with HIV or AIDS would be allowed to travel to attend the Gay Games in Chicago. The provision of such a waiver had the support of Chicago's Mayor Richard M. Daley and Illinois-elected Representative Jan Schakowsky. Waivers for travel restrictions regularly have been provided for events such as the Olympics and international conferences. The previous Gay Games in the United States, the 1994 Gay Games, received a similar waiver from then-President Bill Clinton.

== Outreach program ==
Chicago Games Inc. organized a successful outreach program which enabled 120 scholarship athletes from South Africa, Croatia, United States, United Kingdom, Australia, Papua New Guinea, Eastern Europe, Asia, and South America to attend the games.

== Opening ceremony ==
2006 Gay Games opening ceremony

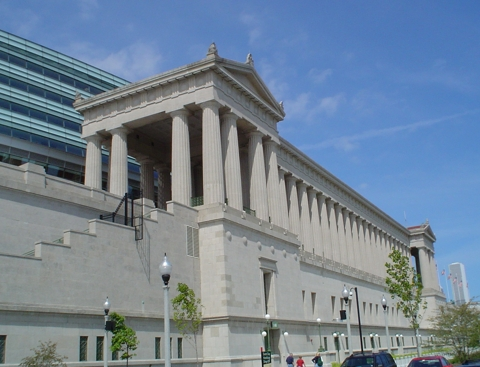
Soldier Field hosted the opening ceremonies of Gay Games VII.

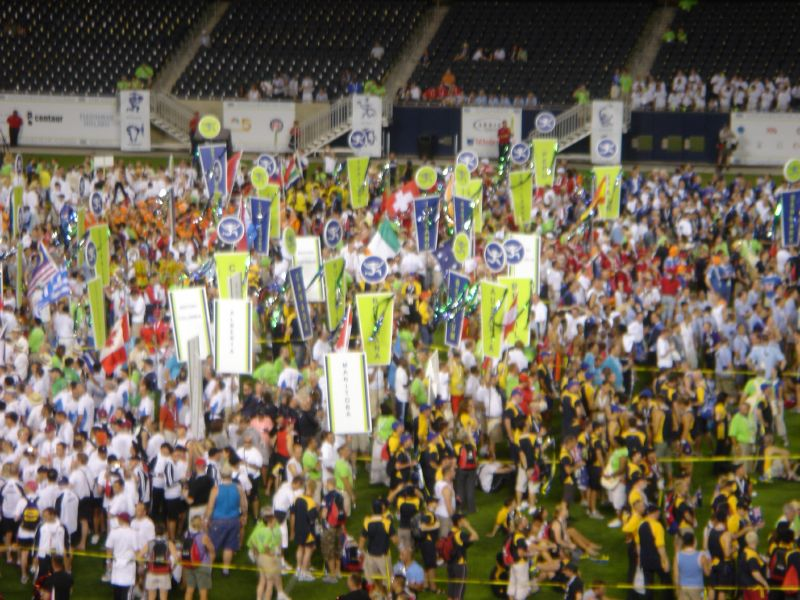

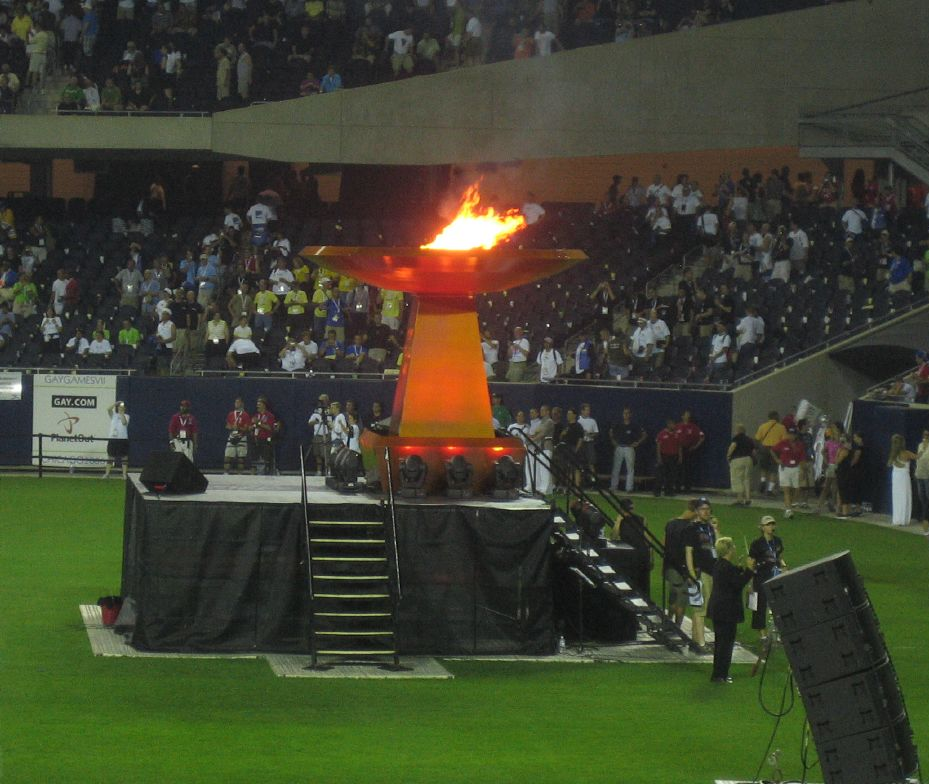
Opening ceremony

40,000 people attended the ceremony which took place in Chicago's Soldier Field on July 15, 2006.

=== Program ===
The concept for opening ceremony, conceived and directed by Kile Ozier, was to tell the parallel stories of the evolution of the GLBT community as a community and as individuals; giving it a global context and relevance. The four acts represent the four stages of this evolutionary process as envisioned by the director: Exclusion - that moment when we discover that we may not fit into the world as we might have thought, growing up ... the moment of discovery of difference; Oppression - the manifestation and formalization of the dynamic initiated in Exclusion ... homophobia, gay bashing, contemplation and execution of suicide out of despair ... ending with the embracing of self and the beginnings of hope; Expression - the power of community and standing up for oneself, of coming out of the closet, finding "like others", celebration of individuality and difference within even our own communities; Ignition - the taking of all this powerful energy and philosophy and lighting the world with the ideals of enlightenment and acceptance.

At the midway point of the ceremony was the "Exhortation to a Weary Army", a reinvigoration to the community in the worldwide fight against AIDS, given from the AIDS Memorial Quilt, and tribute to Tom Waddell, the founder of the global Gay Sports movement and the Gay Games.

The ceremony consisted of five parts:

Prologue

- DJ Frankie Knuckles, the "Godfather of House" (a genre of music which originated in Chicago) played music for the prologue
- The Procession of over 11,000 athletes and participants of Gay Games VII in a record 46 minutes
- Oath to the Athletes and Participants led by David Kopay
- The National Anthem of the United States of America - Christy Fairbairn Hasselson, Windy City Gay Idol 2006
- Oath to the Officials - Billy Bean, Saskia Webber
- Welcome by Chicago Games Inc. - Co and vice chairs: Sam Coady, Suzanne Arnold, Tracy Baim, Kevin Boyer
- Responsibility for Change - Megan Mullally
- Welcome by Chicago Mayor Richard M. Daley

Act I "Exclusion"

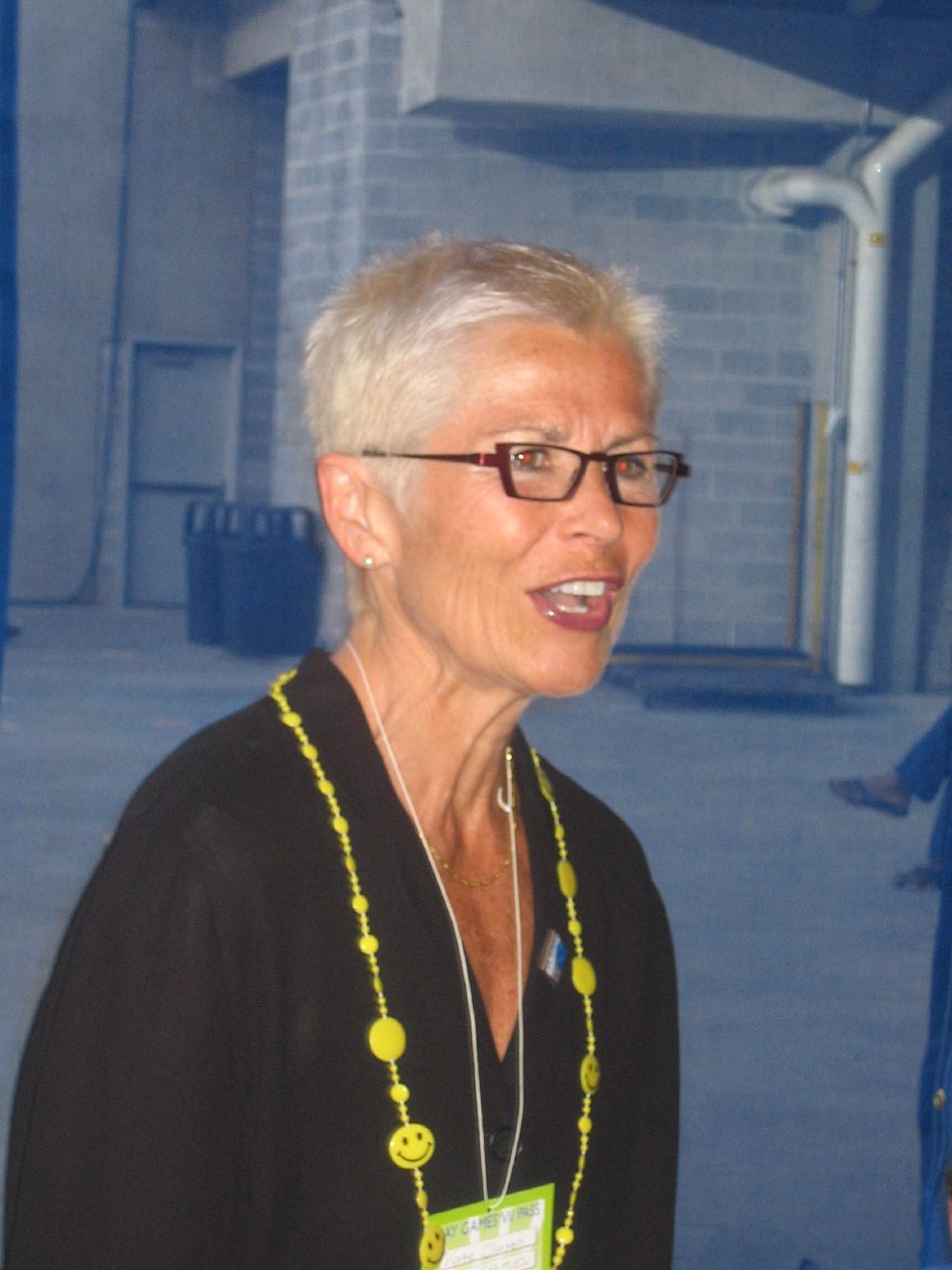
Kate Clinton at Soldier Field during the opening ceremony.

- Choreography by Iega Jeff
- Special appearance by Erasure's Andy Bell
- Presentation by Kate Clinton
- Welcome - Co-Presidents of the international Federation of Gay Games: Kathleen Webster and Roberto Mantaci
- Legends of Women's Music: Holly Near, Barbara Higbie, Nedra Johnson, Teresa Trull

Act II "Oppression"

- Choreography by Joel Hall
- Special Appearance by Erasure's Andy Bell
- Presentations by Staceyann Chin, George Takei, Jorge Valencia
- Rainbow Run for the End of HIV and Cancer: Brent Nicholson Earle, Rob Hadley, Renae Ogletree, Modesto "Tico" Valle
- Tribute to Tom Waddell, founder of the Gay Games Movement
- Tom Waddell Award- presented by Greg Louganis and Jessica Waddell Lewinstein
- Performance by Jody Watley
- Keynote address by United States Ambassador James C. Hormel
- The Quilt - Keith Boykin delivering the "Exhortation to a Weary Army"

Act III "Expression"

- Choreographed by Michele Lynch
- Performance by the cast of "Avenue Q"
- Presentations by David da Silva Cornell who read from "Knocking On Your Closet Door; Come Out and March With Us" and by Margaret Cho
- Erasure's Andy Bell sings "A Little Respect"
- "Proud" - Heather Small
- Presentation of the Federation of the Gay Games Flag
- "Take the Flame" the Official Anthem of the Gay Games, performed by Esera Tuaolo

Act IV "Ignition" and the Lighting of the Flame

- Choreographed by Christopher Harrison
- Introduced by Suzanne Westenhoefer
- Ignition of the flame
- Exit

=== Opening speech ===
Mayor Richard M. Daley gave the opening speech.

"On behalf of all the people of Chicago, I'm delighted to welcome you to the seventh Gay Games. I want to acknowledge the Co-Chairs of Chicago Games, Suzanne Arnold and Sam Coady, Vice Co-Chairs Tracy Baim and Kevin Boyer, as well as their staff and all the volunteers who have worked tirelessly to make these games a reality. I would also like to thank the Federation of Gay Games, for choosing Chicago as the 2006 host City and for carrying on the vision of Tom Waddell. Chicago is pleased and honored to have been selected to host this historic event, and you could not have chosen a more appropriate site."

== Venues ==
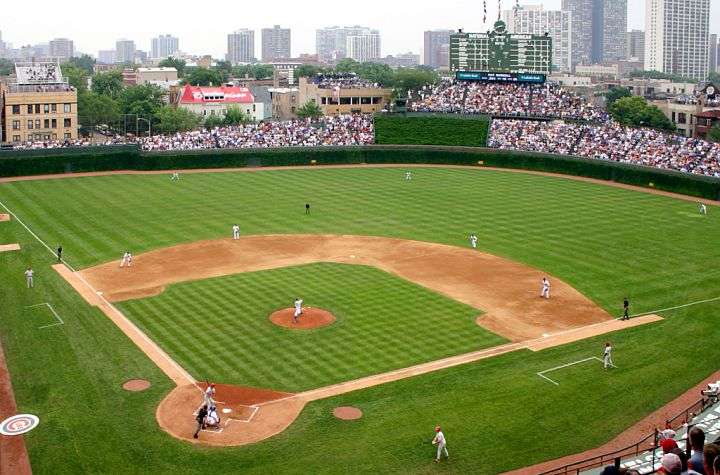
Wrigley Field hosted several field events and the closing ceremonies (note: this photo is of an unrelated, Chicago Cubs baseball game).

Competitions were held at 33 venues across Chicago and its suburbs.

- Badminton: Oak Park High School and River Forest High School
- Basketball: UIC Physical Education Building
- Beach volleyball: North Avenue Beach
- Bowling: Waveland Bowl and Diversey Bowl
- Cycling (criterium, road race, time trial, mountain biking): Sherman Park, Washington Park and Palos Forest Preserve
- Dancesport: Hilton Chicago
- Darts: Hilton Chicago
- Diving: Norris Aquatics Center
- Figure skating: McFetridge Park
- Soccer
- Flag football: Washington Park
- Golf: Jackson Park Golf Course
- Half marathon: Lakeshore Marathon Course
- Ice hockey: American Heartland Ice Arena
- Marathon: Lakeshore Marathon Course
- Martial arts: Gerald Ratner Athletics Center
- Physique: Welsh-Ryan Arena
- Pool billiards
- Powerlifting: Welsh-Ryan Arena
- Racquetball: Lakeshore Athletic Club
- Road races 5/10K
- Rowing: Crystal Lake
- Rugby
- Sailing: Lake Michigan
- Softball
- Squash
- Swimming: Gerald Ratner Athletics Center; 1.5k Open Water Swim: Lake Michigan
- Synchronized swimming
- Tennis: Northwestern University and Waveland Tennis Center
- Track and field: Hanson Stadium
- Triathlon: Lakefront Triathlon Course
- Volleyball Navy Pier
- Water polo
- Wrestling: Northwestern University

=== Other events ===
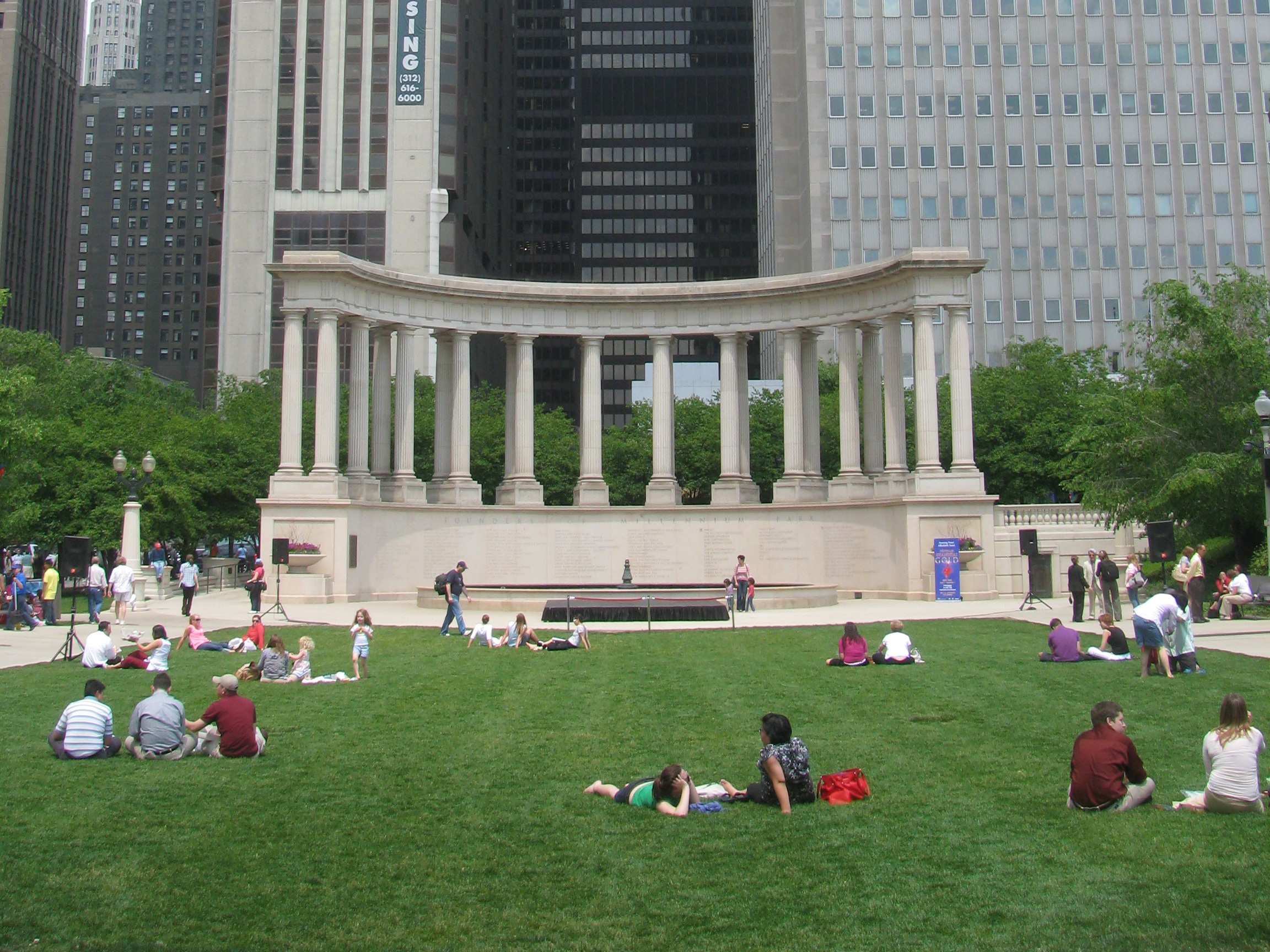
Medal ceremonies were held at Wrigley Square.

- Band concerts: Millennium Park
- Cheer exhibition: Millennium Park
- Choral concerts: Millennium Park
- Closing ceremony: Wrigley Field
- Color guard exhibition: Millennium Park
- Medal ceremonies: Millennium Park (Wrigley Square)
- Opening ceremony: Soldier Field
- Sports Equality Day conference: Roosevelt University

== Sporting events ==
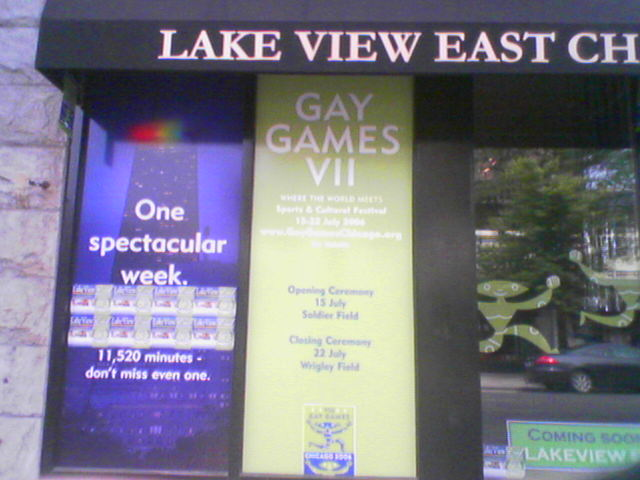
Lake View East Chamber of Commerce advertised Gay Games VII throughout its neighborhood.

=== Results ===
Badminton singles	Gold	Silver	Bronze
Men's T	Dexter Giffard (Chicago, Illinois, US)	Chris van der Westhuizen (Milwaukee, Wisconsin, US)	Mark Scrivener (London, UK)
Men's A	Collin Koo (Vancouver, BC, Canada)	Richard Liu (London, UK)	Aaron Ray Antonio (Chicago, Illinois, US)
Men's B	Dariusz Zieba (Phoenix, Arizona, US)	Martin Kraemer (Munich, Germany)	Malcolm Banks (London, UK)
Men's CC	Ron Ng	Dennis Fong (San Leandro, California, US)	Lucas Wonn (Chicago, Illinois, US)
Men's C	AJ Jamal (Long Beach, California, US)	Jeff Weber (Chicago, Illinois, US)	Rick Jun Li
Women's A	Cindy Lee (Austin, Texas, Texas, US)	Suanne Au (Lincoln, Nebraska US)	Amy Ma (Arlington Heights, Illinois, US)
Women's B	Laura Grieve (San Francisco, California, US)	Bonnie May (Florence, Massachusetts, US)	Ilse Aben (Amsterdam, Netherlands)
Women's C	Coni Staff (Forestville, California, US)	Karen Shoffner (Elk Grove Village, Illinois, US)	Emma Lou "Scottie" Scott (Houston, Texas, US)

== Closing ceremony ==
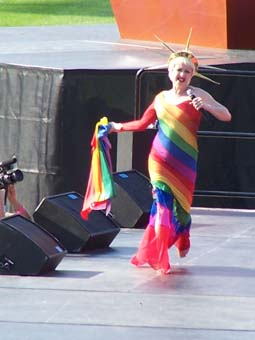
Cyndi Lauper sings at Gay Games VII's Closing Ceremony at Wrigley Field.

The Games' closing ceremony was held July 22, 2006 at Wrigley Field. 25,000 spectators attended. Mayor Richard M. Daley handed over the flag to the Deputy Mayor of Cologne, host of the next Gay Games. Performers included, amongst others, Cyndi Lauper.

== Broadcast and coverage ==
The 2006 Gay Games received an unprecedented level of media coverage, both ahead of and during the Games. The games benefited from its leadership's media connections, with Baim being the founder and producer of the Windy City Times and Boyer being a prominent Chicago public relations manager. Early into the planning of the games, media sponsorship from 67 companies and media outlets secured US$7 million of advertising and editorial space.

The games were to be exclusively aired on the Q Television Network after they signed an exclusive deal with the Chicago organizers worth $3.2 million. QTV had agreed to make their broadcasts available in over 150 markets worldwide. This deal later fell through though, and the games were instead covered through a number of media outlets.

The games received coverage on CNN, NBC's The Today Show, and The Weather Channel. 700 media representatives from 250 different outlets were awarded credentials during the games. Local papers featured front-page coverage of the Games. Fleishman-Hillard donated time and expertise to make sure that stories covering the games were published in Europe, South Africa, Australia, and the US. Major media sponsors of these games included Sirius XM Radio, Logo TV, The New York Times, Out.com and Gay.com. Additionally, local Chicago newspapers, such as the Chicago Sun-Times and the Chicago Free Press, served as sponsors.

== Sponsors ==
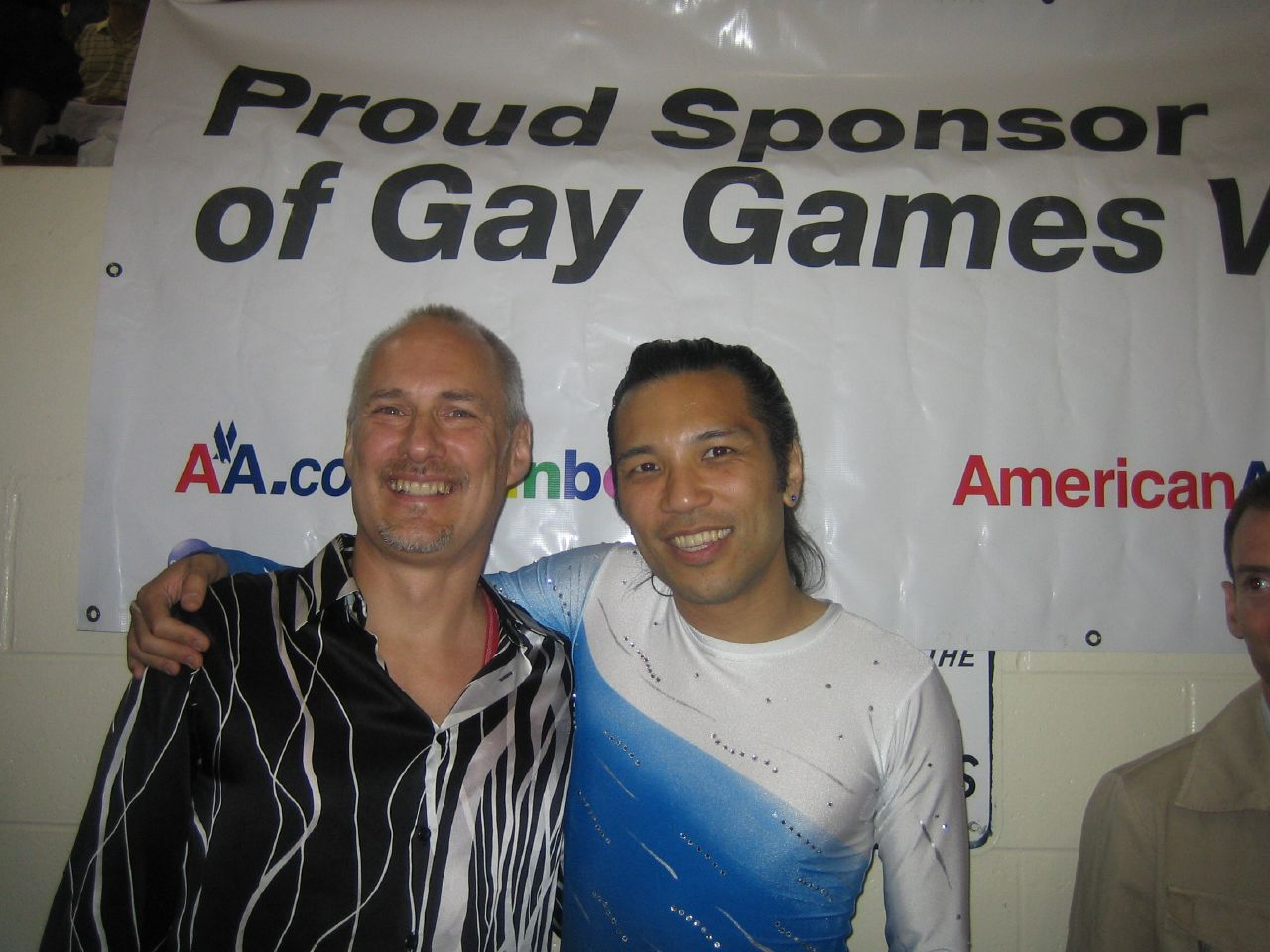
Figure skaters standing in front of a banner proclaiming American Airlines' sponsorship of the games

The Gay Games received an unprecedented level of corporate sponsorship for its 2006 edition. Among the more than 300 sponsors that provided financial contributions and in-kind support to the Games were American Airlines, PepsiCo, Glaxo, Orbitz, Viacom's Logo TV channel, SiriusXM, ESPN, Ernst & Young and Chicago-based companies like Kraft and Walgreens.

Individual sponsorship ranged from $500 to over $1 million.

== Legacy ==
The games were the first in over 20 years to make a profit.

The games were estimated to have between a $50 and $80 million financial impact on the host city.

Chicago later launched an, ultimately unsuccessful, bid for the 2016 Summer Olympics. It was felt that Chicago's experience hosting the Gay Games might boost its chances of winning its Olympic bid.

== See also ==
- Gay Games
- Federation of Gay Games
- 1st World Outgames
- National Gay Basketball Association
