= 2013 World Outgames =

International LGBTQ sporting event

The 2013 World Outgames is a multi-sports event held from 31 July to 11 August 2013 in Antwerp. It was the third iteration of the World Outgames, featuring competitions in 36 sports, and coinciding with Antwerp Pride Week.
