= Sporting boycott of South Africa during the apartheid era =

South Africa under apartheid was subjected to a variety of international boycotts, including on sporting contacts. There was some debate about whether the aim of the boycott was to oppose segregation in sport or apartheid in general, with the latter view prevailing in later decades. While the National Party introduced apartheid in 1948, it added sport-specific restrictions from the late 1950s, on interracial sport within South Africa and international travel by nonwhite athletes. The international federations (IFs) governing various sports began to sanction South Africa, both in response to the new restrictions and in reflection of the broader anti-racism of national federations in newly independent postcolonial states. By the early 1970s, South African national teams were excluded from most Olympic sports, although South Africans competed in individual events in some, mainly professional, sports throughout the 1970s and 1980s. Although from the mid-1970s the National Party relaxed the application of segregation provisions in relation to sport, this failed to alleviate the boycott, which continued until the end of apartheid.

== United Nations ==
In 1980, the United Nations' Centre against Apartheid began compiling a "Register of Sports Contacts with South Africa". This was a list of sportspeople and officials who had participated in events within South Africa. It was compiled mainly from reports in South African newspapers. Being listed did not itself result in any punishment, but was regarded as a moral pressure on athletes. Some sports bodies would discipline athletes based on the register. Athletes could have their names deleted from the register by giving a written undertaking not to return to apartheid South Africa to compete. The register is regarded as having been an effective instrument. A consolidated list running to 56 pages was published in 1991.

The UN General Assembly adopted the International Convention against Apartheid in Sports on 10 December 1985.

== Multisport organisations ==
=== Olympic Games ===
The International Olympic Committee (IOC) withdrew its invitation to South Africa to the 1964 Summer Olympics when interior minister Jan de Klerk insisted the team would not be racially integrated. In 1968, the IOC was prepared to readmit South Africa after assurances that its team would be multi-racial; but a threatened boycott by African nations and others forestalled this. The South African Games of 1969 and 1973 were intended to allow Olympic-level competition for South Africans against foreign athletes. South Africa was formally expelled from the IOC in 1970.

In 1976, African nations demanded that New Zealand be suspended by the IOC for continued contacts with South Africa, including a tour of South Africa by the All Blacks: when the IOC declined to do so, the African teams boycotted the Games. This contributed to the Gleneagles Agreement being adopted by the Commonwealth in 1977.

The IOC adopted a declaration against "apartheid in sport" on 21 June 1988, for the total isolation of apartheid sport.

=== Parasport ===
South Africa participated in the annual International Stoke Mandeville Games (ISMG) after it joined the ISMGF (ISMG Federation) in 1962. ISMG founder Ludwig Guttmann supported South African participation until his death in 1980. Every fourth ISMG was recognised as the quadrennial Summer Paralympic Games, and the ISMGF later evolved into the International Paralympic Committee. From 1965, South Africa alternated white and nonwhite ISMG teams respectively in even- and odd-numbered years. Beginning in 1975, its parasports teams were racially integrated, impelled by the refusal of the organisers of the 1976 Summer Paralympics in Toronto to allow an all-white team. South Africa's presence in Toronto caused the withdrawal of the teams from Jamaica, India, Hungary, Poland, Yugoslavia, Sudan, Uganda, and Kenya, and of the Canadian federal government's promised funding. The associated controversy increased public awareness of, and attendance at, the games.

The organisers of the 1980 and 1984 Paralympics acceded to their governments' demands not to invite South Africa, but through to 1983 it continued to compete in the non-Paralympic ISMGs at Stoke Mandeville. The ISMGF gave a lifetime ban to 1976 table tennis medallist Maggy Jones for distributing anti-apartheid leaflets at the 1979 ISMG. Swimmer Bernard Leach withdrew from the 1981 ISMG and founded Disabled People Against Apartheid, which picketed ISMGs until 1983. In 1985 the ISMGF voted to discontinue invitations to South Africa.

=== Commonwealth Games ===
Prior to apartheid, the 1934 British Empire Games, originally awarded in 1930 to Johannesburg, was moved to London after the South African government refused to allow nonwhite participants. South Africa continued to participate in every Games until it left the Commonwealth in 1961. The Thatcher government's refusal to enforce the Gleneagles Agreement in the UK led Nigeria to initiate a boycott of the 1986 Commonwealth Games in Edinburgh, which involved 32 of 59 eligible teams.

=== Other ===
The National Collegiate Athletic Association, which governs many North American university sports, permitted South Africans to receive athletic scholarships and compete in its events. Most such student athletes were white; one exception was runner Sydney Maree, who later became a U.S. citizen.

The Gay Games were instigated by San Francisco Arts and Athletics (SFAA), and South Africans participated in the first (1982) edition. Calls to ban them from the 1986 games were rejected by SFAA as inconsistent with its message of inclusivity, but the few (white) South Africans considering entry decided to withdraw. The SFAA objected when the organisers of the 1990 games in Vancouver pledged to enforce the Gleneagles Agreement and exclude South Africa; this contributed to the foundation of the Gay Games Federation in 1989, which took over the SFAA's responsibility and endorsed the Vancouver position.

== By sport ==
The extent of boycotting varied between different sports, in the degree of contact permitted and the severity of punishment of "rebels" who defied the sanctions. This reflected the different political and social composition of each sport's IF.

=== Athletics ===
In track and field athletics, a motion to suspend South Africa from the IAAF was defeated in 1966, but had been passed by 1970. The suspension was renewed year‐to‐year until South Africa was formally expelled in 1976. After the end of the apartheid system, South Africa officially rejoined IAAF in 1992. Zola Budd's time for the women's 5,000m in January 1984 was not ratified as a world record because it was outside the auspices of the IAAF.

=== Boxing ===
South Africa's amateur boxing association was expelled from the AIBA in 1968.

The professional boxing South African Boxing Board of Control (SABBC) was expelled from the World Boxing Council (WBC) in 1975. The WBC remained vocal in opposition to apartheid, and refused to include South African boxers in its rankings.

The SABBC had affiliated to the rival World Boxing Association (WBA) in 1974. It was soon well represented on the WBA executive, and the 1978 conference was held there. Many WBA title fights were held there, some in Boputhatswana, a putatively independent bantustan. When John Tate beat Gerry Coetzee at Loftus Versfeld in 1979, the stadium had a desegregated audience for the first time. Although Don King criticised Tate's promoter Bob Arum for doing business in South Africa, King did so himself in 1984. In 1986 the WBA voted to suspend the SABBC until the end of apartheid. South African boxers remained eligible for WBA rankings and fights outside the country. The Nevada State Athletic Commission withdrew from the WBA for a time in 1987, citing its lax apartheid policy as one reason.

=== Chess ===
In the 1970 Chess Olympiad, a number of players and teams protested against South Africa's inclusion, some withdrawing themselves, and the Albanian team forfeited its match against the South African team. South Africa was expelled from FIDE while participating in the 1974 Chess Olympiad, finally returning to international competition in the 1992 Chess Olympiad.

=== Cricket ===
Cricket had been organised on racial lines in South Africa from its earliest days with the "Coloured" cricketer Krom Hendricks excluded from provincial and national teams from the 1890s. However, the cricketing boycott was prompted by the "D'Oliveira affair"of Basil D'Oliveira, a "Cape Coloured" South African, for the England team in 1968. The 1970 South African tour of England was called off and replaced by a "Rest of the World" tour featuring several South African players. The International Cricket Conference (ICC) imposed a moratorium on tours in 1970. World Series Cricket, run outside the auspices of the ICC in 1977–79, included South African players in its "Rest of the World" team. There were several "private" tours in the 1970s and "rebel" tours in the 1980s. Sanctions for rebel tourists more severe in the West Indies and Sri Lanka than England and Australia. In the 1980s, up to 80 English players spent the English winter playing South African domestic cricket. In 1989, the ICC agreed that playing in South Africa would carry a minimum 4-year ban on international selection, with an amnesty for previous instances.

=== Golf ===
In the World Cup, the Greek government banned South Africa from the 1979 competition in Athens. South Africa competed in the 1980 edition in Bogotá. The prospect of their appearing in the 1981 edition, due to be staged at Waterville in Ireland, caused it to be cancelled. South Africa did not reappear until the post-apartheid era in 1992.

South African golfers continued to play around the world, including PGA Tour, European Tour, and Grand Slam events. Outside golfers competed freely in South African Tour events. The Million Dollar Challenge at the Sun City resort regularly attracted some of the world's top golfers. The Official World Golf Ranking included South African Tour events in its calculations from its instigation in 1986.

=== Motorsport ===
South African world champions during apartheid included Jody Scheckter (1979 Formula One) and motorcyclists Kork Ballington (two titles each in 1978 and 1979) and Jon Ekerold (1980 350cc).

Several constructors withdrew from the 1985 edition of the South African Formula One Grand Prix, the last held before the end of apartheid. French constructors Renault and Ligier acceded to pressure to boycott from the Mitterrand–Fabius administration. Alan Jones later admitted that he had feigned illness to withdraw his Haas Lola from the race, because its sponsor, Beatrice Foods, was under pressure from African American employees. Some drivers said they were competing reluctantly and only out of contractual obligation to their constructor.

The South African motorcycle Grand Prix likewise lapsed after 1985.

=== Rugby union ===
South Africa remained a member of the International Rugby Board (IRB) throughout the apartheid era. Halt All Racist Tours was established in New Zealand in 1969 to oppose continued tours to and from South Africa. Apartheid South Africa's last foreign tour was to New Zealand in 1981. This tour was highly controversial due to the difference of opinions. Though contacts were restricted after the Gleneagles Agreement in 1977, there were controversial tours in 1980 by the British Lions and by France, in 1981 by Ireland, and in 1984 by England. In 1986, though a Lions tour was cancelled, South Africans played in all-star matches in Cardiff and in London marking the IRB centenary. South Africa was excluded from the first two Rugby World Cups, in 1987 and 1991.

=== Football ===
South Africa was suspended from FIFA in 1961, with Stanley Rous, FIFA's president, flying to South Africa in 1963 to negotiate its reinstatement with the South African Government. The South African FA proposed entering an all-white team in the 1966 World Cup and an all-black team in the 1970 World Cup, but this proposal was ultimately rejected. The South African FA was suspended by FIFA in September 1965, and expelled from FIFA in 1976.

=== Softball ===
Mexico and Philippines withdrew from the 1976 Men's Softball World Championship in Lower Hutt, New Zealand due to the participation of South Africa. Both countries' associations were suspended by the International Softball Federation

=== Surfing ===
Surf culture traditionally self-identified as apolitical. The International Surfing Association (ISA) and professional surf tours had events in South Africa in the 1970s and 1980s, at which Native Hawaiian competitors were treated as honorary whites by organisers. The 1978 ISA World Championship and 1982 World Surf League held in South Africa were boycotted by Australia, though individual Australians competed in the latter event. Australian Tom Carroll, having competed since 1981 in South African events, became in 1985 the first professional to boycott them. Shaun Tomson and Wendy Botha respectively won the 1977 International Professional Surfers and 1987 ISA Women's World Championship as South Africans and later competed with acquired American and Australian nationality.

=== Table tennis ===
The South African Table Tennis Board (SATTB), a body founded in contravention to the white South African table tennis board, was substituted for the latter by the International Table Tennis Federation. While the SATTB team was able to participate in the world championships held in Stockholm in 1957, team members were immediately refused passports by the government. It ruled that no black could compete internationally except through the white sports body.

=== Tennis ===
At the 1964 Wimbledon Championships, the Soviet government ordered Alex Metreveli to withdraw from his 3rd-round singles match against South African Abe Segal, and the Hungarian government ordered István Gulyás to withdraw as Segal's partner in the men's doubles. The following month's International Lawn Tennis Federation meeting strongly rejected a Soviet proposal to expel South Africa, and passed two resolutions: one prohibiting racial discrimination at international tournaments, and the other prohibiting unauthorised withdrawal from tournaments except for "reasons of health or bereavement". Despite the ILTF rule Toomas Leius withdrew from his quarterfinal against Cliff Drysdale in the 1965 French Championships; in contrast, Metreveli played and lost to South African Terry Ryan at the 1969 French Open.

The 1973 World Championship Tennis circuit tour was split into two groups playing parallel tournaments. Group B included a tournament in Johannesburg while Group A included anti-apartheid players Metreveli and Arthur Ashe. Both groups included South African players.

In the Davis Cup, the South Africa team was ejected from the 1970 edition, in part thanks to campaigning by Ashe, and was banned indefinitely. In 1973, after Ashe reported that the country's tennis organisation was sufficiently integrated, it was reinstated, but was placed in the Americas Zone instead of the Europe Zone where other African countries played. The 1974 edition saw the final scratched and South Africa awarded the Davis Cup after India refused to travel to South Africa for the final. While Ashe criticised India at the time, he later felt he had misread progress in tennis as broader progress in South African society. Mexico and Colombia refused to play South Africa in 1975, as did Mexico again in 1976. Britain, France, and the United States all threatened to withdraw from the 1977 edition after a vote to suspend boycotting teams narrowly failed. In 1977 William Hester, president of the United States Tennis Association, said "We do not support or agree with the apartheid policy of the South African government .... But we have entered the draw and, unfortunately, we have to play South Africa — and in the United States." During the 1977 match in California, U.S. manager Tony Trabert "hit two protestors with a racket". At the 1978 rematch in Tennessee, attendance was low and there were "more police (150) than protesters (40) outside the gym." In 1979, South Africa was banned from the Davis Cup until the end of the apartheid regime.

The South Africa women's team participated in the Federation Cup (now Fed Cup) through to 1977, hosting and winning the 1972 edition in Johannesburg.

Throughout the apartheid era, the South African Open (South African Championships before the open era) remained a recognised ILTF event. From 1972 the men's event was part of the Grand Prix circuit (since 1990 the ATP Tour) awarding world ranking points. South African players continued to compete on the pro tours; Johan Kriek and Kevin Curren reached Grand Slam finals, with both later becoming naturalised US citizens.

=== Other ===
By the end of 1970 South Africa had either been expelled or suspended by FIBA (basketball), UCI (cycling), FIE (fencing), International Gymnastics Federation, International Judo Federation, International Federation of Netball Associations, FHI (weightlifting) and FILA (wrestling).

By 1978, sports in which South Africa remained a member of the IF while being excluded from the world championships included fencing, field hockey, rowing, and water-skiing.

== Foreign eligibility ==
Some elite South African sportspeople competed internationally for another country, after becoming eligible through naturalization, length of residency, or other criteria applicable by the relevant IF. Examples include runner Zola Budd, whose UK nationality application was fast-tracked in time for the 1984 Summer Olympics; and cricketer Kepler Wessels, who acquired Australian eligibility in the 1980s through residency, before returning to South Africa, for whom he played after the end of apartheid. The 1994 film Muriel's Wedding recounts a fictional 1980s Australian's sham marriage to a South African swimmer seeking Olympic eligibility.

== End of apartheid ==
Negotiations to end apartheid began with the 1990 release from prison of Nelson Mandela and culminated in the Government of National Unity formed by Mandela after the 1994 election. In parallel with this transition, sports ended their boycotts and each sport's IF admitted a nonracial South Africa governing body. The European Community announced its member governments' ending of the boycott in June 1991. India, which vehemently opposed South Africa's apartheid policy and was at the forefront of isolating the country internationally at all levels, ended its boycott in 1991 by inviting the South African cricket team to the country for an ODI series and subsequently allowed the Indian cricket team to tour South Africa for a Test and ODI series in late 1992. The country's hosting and winning of the 1995 Rugby World Cup was a powerful boost to post-apartheid South Africa's return to the international sporting scene.

A 1999 academic paper argues that "sport fulfilled an important symbolic function in the anti-apartheid struggle and was able to influence the other policy actors, but generally to a far less significant extent than is usually asserted".

== See also ==
- Academic boycott of South Africa
- Foreign relations of South Africa during apartheid
- Sports diplomacy

== Sources ==
- Booth, Douglas (1998). The Race Game: Sport and Politics in South Africa. Routledge. ISBN 0-7146-4799-3 – via Internet Archive.
- Gemmell, Jon (2004). The politics of South African cricket. London; New York: Routledge. ISBN 978-0-203-50580-9 – via Internet Archive.
- Guelke, Adrian (1986). "The politicisation of South African sport". In Allison, Lincoln (ed.). The Politics of sport. Manchester University Press. pp. 118–148. ISBN 978-0-7190-2334-7 – via Internet Archive.
- Lapchick, Richard Edward (1975). The politics of race and international sport: the case of South Africa. Westport, Conn: Greenwood. ISBN 978-0-8371-7691-8 – via Internet Archive.
- Rademeyer, Cobus (June 2017). "Sport for People with Disabilities as Factor in Reshaping the Post-Apartheid South African Sporting Society" (PDF). Journal for Contemporary History. 42 (1): 81–98. doi:10.18820/24150509/JCH42.v1.5.
- United Nations Centre against Apartheid (July 1978). South Africa's Standing in International Sport. United Nations (New York). JSTOR al.sff.document.nuun1978_20.
