= Mary Dunlap =

Mary Dunlap may refer to:

- Mary C. Dunlap, American civil rights lawyer
- Mary Knight Dunlap, founded the Association of Women Veterinarians
