= 1982 Gay Games =

LGBT multi-sport event in San Francisco, US

I Gay Games San Francisco 1982
- Host city: San Francisco, California, United States
- Nations: 10
- Athletes: 1,350
- Events: 16 sports
- Opening: August 28, 1982
- Closing: September 5, 1982
- Opened by: Tom Waddell
- Main venue: Kezar Stadium

The 1982 Gay Games (Gay Games I) were held in San Francisco, California, United States from August 28 – September 5, 1982. They were the first Gay Games, an event officially conceived by Tom Waddell, an athlete and activist, along with the help of many others. The event's goal was to promote the acceptance and inclusion of gay, lesbian and transgender athletes in the athletic world and celebrate their abilities and achievements. A total of 1,350 competitors from over 170 cities globally participated in the first Gay Games and the 9 day event attracted an estimated 10,000 people.

Parallel to the Olympics, a torch was carried from New York, at the site of the Stonewall riots, all the way to Kezar Stadium where the opening and closing ceremonies were held. Other events took place in different surrounding areas as participants from around the world competed in various events such as swimming, track, and field, basketball, boxing, golf and more. The event also featured a performance by Tina Turner during the opening ceremony, and Stephanie Mills during the closing ceremony along with San Francisco Gay Freedom Day Marching Band and Twirling Corps and Meg Christian singing a "Gay Anthem". Congressman Philip Burton also spoke at the event during the closing ceremony.

== Events schedule ==
Event	August				September					Venue
Event	28th	29th	30th	31st	1st	2nd	3rd	4th	5th	Venue
Opening and closing ceremonies										Kezar Stadium
Basketball										Kezar Pavilion
Billiards										Park Bowl
Bowling										Park Bowl
Boxing										Kezar Pavilion
Cycling										Golden Gate Park
Golf										Harding Golf Course
Marathon										Golden Gate Park
Physique										Castro Theater
Powerlifting										Body Center
Soccer										Kezar Stadium
Softball										Lang Field
Swimming										San Francisco State University
Swimming and Diving										San Francisco State University
Tennis										San Francisco City College
Track and Field										San Francisco State University
Volleyball										San Francisco City College
Wrestling										Kezar Pavilion

== Origin ==
The idea for the Games first came from Tom Waddell after he watched a gay men's bowling tournament on television. He felt that too often the Gay Rights Movement was dominated by stereotypes, and people's perception of the movement only included young, white men and excluded any other types of people in the LGBT+ community. He wanted to emphasized that gay men and women were men and women first before they were gay, and felt that the gay men's bowling tournament was helping to accomplish that by focusing on the talent of the bowlers without erasing and forcing them to hide their sexuality.

Waddell and his friend Mark Brown then came up with the idea to have a tournament based on the ancient Olympics that showcased many athletic talents and would include anyone despite their age, race, gender, sexual-orientation or ability. Joined by another friend named Paul Mart, Waddell and Brown created the Gay Olympic Committee on June 15, 1980, which expanded into the San Francisco Art & Athletics (SFAA) Committee.

== Fundraising ==
The SFAA developed an approach to fundraising based on the classes Tom Waddell took that emphasized asking for money and then "keeping your mouth shut". The theory here was that a prospective donor would be given the chance to speak they will be more likely to give, whereas if the sales person is the only one speaking the donor won't give. They found this "pitch and wait" method to be particularly helpful as they canvassed different gay people and groups to donate to the event.

Despite many people's concerns and the general reluctance of many to support the Games, the SFAA was able to break even, costing $380,000 and bringing in $395,000, encouraging the SFAA and Waddell to continue the Games again in 1986.

== Controversies ==
=== Lawsuit over 'Gay Olympics' name ===
Dr. Tom Waddell, the former Olympian who helped found the games, intended them to be called the "Gay Olympics", but a lawsuit filed less than three weeks before 1982's inaugural Gay Olympics forced the name change.

Event organizers were sued by the International Olympic Committee (IOC) under the U.S. Amateur Sports Act of 1978, which gave the USOC exclusive rights to the word Olympic in the United States. Defendants of the lawsuit contended that the law was capriciously applied and that if the Special Olympics were not similarly prohibited, the Gay Olympics should not be either.

Others, like Daniel Bell, cite the IOC's long history of protecting the Olympics brand as evidence that the lawsuit against the "Gay Olympics" was not motivated by discrimination against gays. Since 1910 the IOC has taken action, including lawsuits and expulsion from the IOC, to stop certain organizations from using the word "Olympics." Annual "California Police Olympics" were held for 22 years, from 1967 through 1989, after which, the word Olympics was no longer used for the event. The Supreme Court ruled for the USOC in San Francisco Arts & Athletics, Inc. v. United States Olympic Committee.

A 2009 documentary film, Claiming the Title: Gay Olympics on Trial, was created in the United States and was previewed at several film festivals. The subject was also included in a 2005 film by David Sector, Take the Flame! Gay Games: Grace Grit & Glory.

In the years since the lawsuit, the Olympics and the Gay Games have set aside their initial hostilities and worked cooperatively, successfully lobbying to have HIV travel restrictions waived for the 1994 Gay Games in New York and the 1996 Summer Olympics in Atlanta.

=== Olympia film screening ===
Tom Waddell planned to screen the 1938 Nazi propaganda film Olympia due to the film's 'artistic beauty'. He was quoted saying that he chose the film "not for its minimal political content" but because it was a "paean to the human body and to sports", arguing that the director Leni Riefenstahl was able to capture "will an strength." Waddell acknowledged the film's blatant use by Adolf Hitler as Nazi propaganda, but argued that viewers should be able to see it as both an example of what the Olympics should and should not be, calling it the best Olympic film that was out yet in terms of quality despite the clear pro-Nazi messaging.

This caused an issue among many gay and lesbian Jewish people who passed around leaflets that denounced the film as Nazi propaganda and demanded the SFAA to cancel the screening. Others personally attacked Waddell, accusing him of being obsessed with a fascist view of the white male body and being involved in the Nazi party, and were appalled that the SFAA would try to make money using a Nazi propaganda film. Waddell responded by canceling the screening, knowing that without the support of the gay and lesbian Jewish community the SFAA could not succeed. He later complained to a journalist that he was "yielding to the same kind of censorship the Nazis themselves practiced".

The connection to this film's ideals and the accusation that Waddell, and the Games by proxy, were showcasing and celebrating only one specific view of the white male body continued to follow the Games into the future despite the original intention to welcome everyone and move away from centering young, white male bodies in the Gay Rights Movement.
