= Kitty Tsui =

Chinese American author, poet, actor, and bodybuilder

- Born: September 4, 1952 (age 73); Hong Kong
- Occupations: Poet, activist
- Notable work: The Words of a Woman Who Breathes Fire, Breathless, Sparks Fly.

Kitty Tsui (born September 4, 1952) is an American author, poet, actor, and bodybuilder. She was the first known Chinese-American lesbian to publish a book (Words of a Woman who Breathes Fire, published in 1983).

== Personal life ==
Tsui was born in Hong Kong and lived there with her grandmother, Chinese actress Kwan Ying Lin, until she was five. She then lived with her parents in Liverpool, England until they immigrated to San Francisco in 1968. She attended Lowell High School. Tsui graduated from San Francisco State University in 1975 with a bachelor's degree in creative writing.

Tsui came out as a lesbian in 1973, at age 21, and was rejected by most of her family and friends. After the death of a friend in 1986, Tsui began bodybuilding.

== Career ==
=== Writing ===
She is the author of Words of a Woman who Breathes Fire (the first known book by a Chinese-American lesbian, published in 1983), Breathless (a short story collection of BDSM erotica which won the Firecracker Alternative Book Award, published in 1996), and Sparks Fly (a novel written from the perspective of a gay leatherman in San Francisco, published in 1997). She has also been published in over ninety anthologies and journals.

She came out as a leatherwoman in 1988. She wrote the first leather column in the Midwestern United States (called ”Leathertalk: Top to Bottom”, and published in Chicago Nightlines), gave workshops and presentations about leather, and judged leather competitions including International Ms. Leather. She wrote a piece called “sex does not equal death” for the 1996 anthology The Second Coming: A Leatherdyke Reader, edited by Patrick Califia and Robin Sweeney.

=== Acting ===
Tsui has acted in stage productions with the Asian American Theater Company and Lilith Women's Theater, as well as appearing in films including Nice Chinese Girls Don't: Kitty Tsui, Framing Lesbian Fashion, and Women of Gold. Tsui was a founding member of Unbound Feet, the first Asian American women's performance group, and a member of Unbound Feet Three.

=== Bodybuilding ===
Tsui won the bronze medal at the 1986 Gay Games and a gold medal at the 1990 Gay Games in women's physique and bodybuilding. She has competed in a variety of bodybuilding championships and competitions.

== Recognition ==
She is widely recognized as a leader in the Asian American lesbian movement in San Francisco. In 2016, she was given the Asian Pacific Islander Queer Women and Transgender Community’s Phoenix Award for her contributions to the San Francisco AAPIQT and leather communities and her work as an author, activist, and founding member of Unbound Feet. In 2018, she was inducted into San Francisco State University's Alumni Hall of Fame. In 2019, she was one of twelve queer poets from the United States honored in a digital exhibit at the Smithsonian Asian Pacific American Center titled "A Day in the Life of Queer Asian Pacific America". The Lambda Literary Foundation listed Tsui as one of the 50 most influential lesbian and gay writers in the United States.
