= Netball in Indonesia =

- Country: Indonesia
- National team: Indonesia

At the 1994 Gay Games held in New York City, an all-transsexual netball team from Indonesia competed. This team had been the Indonesian national champions.

== Bibliography ==
- Altman, Dennis (2001). "Global Gaze / Global Gays". In Blasius, Mark (ed.). Sexual identities, queer politics. University Press. pp. 96–117. ISBN 0-691-05866-0. OCLC 439890293.
- International Federation of Netball Associations (21 January 2011a). "Current World Rankings". Archived from the original on 19 May 2011.
