= Team San Francisco =

Team San Francisco (Team SF) is an athletics squad formed in 1987 in San Francisco in preparation for the Gay Games III, held in Vancouver, British Columbia in 1990, the first time that the Games were held outside of San Francisco. Team SF was the largest team in attendance, with over 600 Bay Area athletes participating.

As the home city of the first two Gay Games, Team San Francisco are by tradition the first contingent to march into the stadium for the Gay Games Opening Ceremonies.

In 2002, over 1,000 athletes from the San Francisco Bay Area attended the Sydney 2002 Gay Games VI, one quarter of the United States contingent. At the last two Gay Games, Team San Francisco represented 12% of the participants at the events.

Team San Francisco is a California-registered non-profit volunteer organization that provides information and support to individual athletes and sports organizations within the gay and lesbian community in the city, and helps coordinate participation in the Gay Games. Since its incorporation in 1987, Team SF has helped facilitate travel, housing, and uniforms for athletes attending Gay Games III in Vancouver (1990), Gay Games IV in New York City (1994), Gay Games V in Amsterdam (1998), Gay Games VI in Sydney (2002), Gay Games VII in Chicago (2006), and Gay Games VIII in Cologne (2010).
