= San Francisco Arts & Athletics, Inc. v. United States Olympic Committee =

- Supreme Court of the United States

Argued March 24, 1987 Decided June 25, 1987
- Full case name: San Francisco Arts & Athletics, Inc. v. United States Olympic Committee
- Citations: 483 U.S. 522 (more) 107 S. Ct. 2971; 97 L. Ed. 2d 427; 1987 U.S. LEXIS 2895

Case history
- Prior: Summary judgment for respondent granted, 219 U.S.P.Q. 982 (N.D. Cal., 1982); affirmed, 781 F.2d 733 (9th Cir. 1986), rehearing denied, 789 F.2d 1319; cert. granted, 479 U.S. 913 (1986).

Holding
- USOC's right to control the use of the word "Olympic" is not subject to First Amendment defenses nor Lanham Act defenses

Court membership
- Chief Justice William Rehnquist Associate Justices William J. Brennan Jr. · Byron White; Thurgood Marshall · Harry Blackmun; Lewis F. Powell Jr. · John P. Stevens; Sandra Day O'Connor · Antonin Scalia

Case opinions
- Majority: Powell, joined by Rehnquist, White, Stevens, Scalia
- Concur/dissent: O'Connor, joined by Blackmun
- Dissent: Brennan, joined by Marshall

Laws applied
- U.S. Const. amend. I

San Francisco Arts & Athletics, Inc. v. United States Olympic Committee, 483 U.S. 522 (1987), is a decision of the Supreme Court of the United States interpreting the trademark rights of the United States Olympic Committee (USOC) to regulate the use of the word "Olympic" under the Amateur Sports Act of 1978. San Francisco Arts & Athletics, Inc. (SFAA) attempted to organize a sporting events it called the Gay Olympic Games, and the USOC sought to enjoin the games under that name. SFAA claimed that the First Amendment overrode the rights that the Act gave the USOC to control the word Olympic.

The Supreme Court rejected SFAA's First Amendment claim, and the SFAA renamed its event the Gay Games.

== Background ==
Historically, both the Olympic movement as well as the United States' participation evolved without government participation, with the Amateur Athletic Union (AAU) coordinating the United States teams. However, the AAU was criticized for its actions. The AAU had adopted arbitrary rules which prohibited women from participating in running events and prohibited any runner who had raced in the same event as a runner with a shoe-company sponsorship. Congress adopted the Act in response to criticisms of the AAU, effectively removing that organization from any governance role. Accordingly, the United States Congress chartered a United States Olympic Committee and gave it exclusive rights to coordinate United States participation in international competitions. In addition, the Amateur Sports Act provided:

(a) Exclusive Right of Corporation.— Except as provided in subsection (d) of this section, the corporation has the exclusive right to use— ... (4) the words "Olympic", "Olympiad", "Citius Altius Fortius", "Paralympic", "Paralympiad", "Pan-American", "America Espirito Sport Fraternite", or any combination of those words.

SFAA is a non-profit organization that sought to organize the "Gay Olympic Games" patterned after the Olympic Games. There were numerous other organizations that used "Olympics" in their name, including the Junior Olympics, Special Olympics, Eskimo Olympics, and the Olympics of the Mind. SFAA used "Gay Olympics" on its letterheads and mailings, in local newspapers, and on various merchandise sold to cover the costs of the planned Games. The USOC asked SFAA to stop using the word "Olympics" to name its games, and SFAA refused.

Event organizers were sued by the International Olympic Committee (IOC) under the U.S. Amateur Sports Act of 1978, which gave the USOC exclusive rights to the word Olympic in the United States. Defendants of the lawsuit contended that the law was capriciously applied and that if the Special Olympics were not similarly prohibited, the Gay Olympics should not be either.

Others, like Daniel Bell, cite the IOC's long history of protecting the Olympics brand as evidence that the lawsuit against the "Gay Olympics" was not motivated by discrimination against gays. Since 1910 the IOC has taken action, including lawsuits and expulsion from the IOC, to stop certain organizations from using the word "Olympics." Annual "California Police Olympics" were held for 22 years, from 1967 through 1989, after which, the word Olympics was no longer used for the event. The Supreme Court ruled for the USOC in San Francisco Arts & Athletics, Inc. v. United States Olympic Committee.

== Proceedings below ==
In August 1982, the USOC sued SFAA in the United States District Court for the Northern District of California to enjoin the SFAA's use of the word "Olympic". The District Court granted a temporary restraining order and then a preliminary injunction against SFAA shortly before the scheduled date of the first "Gay Olympics". The United States Court of Appeals for the Ninth Circuit affirmed the District Court. After further proceedings, the District Court granted the USOC summary judgment and a permanent injunction as well as ordered SFAA to pay the USOC's attorneys fees.

The Ninth Circuit affirmed the judgment of the District Court, but reversed the attorneys fee award, in a January 1986 ruling. It found that the Act granted the USOC exclusive use of the word "Olympic" without requiring the USOC to prove that the unauthorized use was confusing and without regard to the defenses available to an entity sued for a trademark violation under the Lanham Act. It did not reach the SFAA's contention that the USOC enforced its rights in a discriminatory manner (which it termed a "difficult issue") because the court found that the USOC is not a state actor bound by the constraints of the Constitution. The court also found that the USOC's "property righ[t] [in the word 'Olympic' and its associated symbols and slogans] can be protected without violating the First Amendment."

In April 1986, the Ninth Circuit denied the SFAA's petition for rehearing en banc. Three judges strongly dissented with that decision, finding that the panel's interpretation of the Act raised serious First Amendment issues. The SFAA appealed the case to the U.S. Supreme Court in August 1986.

== The arguments ==
The Supreme Court granted certiorari; it was the second explicitly homosexual rights case to be heard before the Court since 1967 in the pre-Stonewall era (although the Bowers v. Hardwick sodomy laws case had been heard the year before). The SFAA was represented before the court by openly gay San Francisco attorney Mary C. Dunlap. It was also represented by the American Civil Liberties Union. The USOC was represented by well-known Washington trial lawyer Edward Bennett Williams.

During the March 24, 1987, oral arguments, the SFAA said it was denied use of the word "Olympic" due to its being a gay organization, and that the USOC as an agent of the U.S. government could not do so. Dunlap felt that she was likely to lose the case going in, a pessimism that increased when her planned line of argument was derailed by questioning from the bench.

== The decision ==
The opinion of the Court was delivered by Justice Lewis F. Powell, joined by Justices William Rehnquist, John Paul Stevens and Antonin Scalia. Justices Harry Blackmun and Sandra Day O'Connor joined in Parts I, II, and III of the opinion. Justice O'Connor joined by Justice Blackmun filed an opinion concurring and dissenting in part. Justice William J. Brennan filed a dissenting opinion joined by Justice Thurgood Marshall.

In the 7–2 parts, the Court rejected arguments that the USOC's Congressionally-authorized legal rights over use of the word "Olympic" constituted a First Amendment violation. The Court additionally rejected the notion that the SFAA possessed a constitutional right to use the word "Olympics" as a verbal vehicle for portraying their view about the state of gays in America.

In the 5–4 portion, the Court denied that the USOC had violated SFAA's right to equal protection under the laws via a discriminatory ban, vis à vis there having been many other groups staging games of various kinds under the moniker "Olympic".

As a defense, SFAA had claimed that an injunction was unwarranted because there was no likelihood of confusion between the Gay Olympics and the real Olympic Games. In response, the opinion found, the "legislative history demonstrates that Congress intended to provide the USOC with exclusive control of the use of the word 'Olympic' without regard to whether an unauthorized use of the word tends to cause confusion." In general, the opinion found that the defenses that are normally available in Lanham Act cases do not apply to the trademarks protected by the Amateur Sports Act. The majority argued that the USOC and the Olympic movement had devoted considerable effort over time to build up the reputation of the Olympics that SFAA was trying to use. In rejecting SFAA's First Amendment claim because prohibiting the use of the "Olympics" did not prevent SFAA from conveying its message, the Court noted that SFAA was able to conduct its game under a different name.

== The dissent ==
Justice O'Connor joined by Justice Blackmun filed an opinion concurring and dissenting in part. They had joined the first three parts of the majority opinion but dissented from Part IV that dealt with SFAA's claim that the injunction violated the Fifth Amendment because the USOC allowed other events to use the word "Olympics" but refused SFAA because the athletes were gay. The majority found that the government did not control how the USOC enforced its trademark rights and that the Fifth Amendment did not apply. However, O'Connor and Blackmun agreed with Brennan on the equal protection claim based on the Fifth Amendment.

Justice Brennan filed a dissenting opinion joined by Justice Marshall. The dissent argues that "The USOC performs a distinctive, traditional governmental function: it represents this Nation to the world community." The dissent also argued that the government forced the USOC to boycott the 1980 Summer Olympics in Moscow was further evidence of the USOC being a state actor.

The dissent also finds the trademark provision of the Act overly broad. "The statute is overbroad on its face, because it is susceptible of application to a substantial amount of noncommercial speech, and vests the USOC with unguided discretion to approve and disapprove others' noncommercial use of 'Olympic'." The dissent views the injunction as violating SFAA's First Amendment rights. The dissent noted, "Here, the SFAA intended, by use of the word 'Olympic', to promote a realistic image of homosexual men and women that would help them move into the mainstream of their communities." Preventing the SFAA from calling its games the "Gay Olympics" prevents the SFAA from expressing this idea. The dissent also argued that the Act regulated speech in a manner that was not content neutral. The Act allows the USOC to endorse particular non-commercial messages while prohibiting others. Accordingly, the dissent would have found for SFAA.

== Aftermath ==
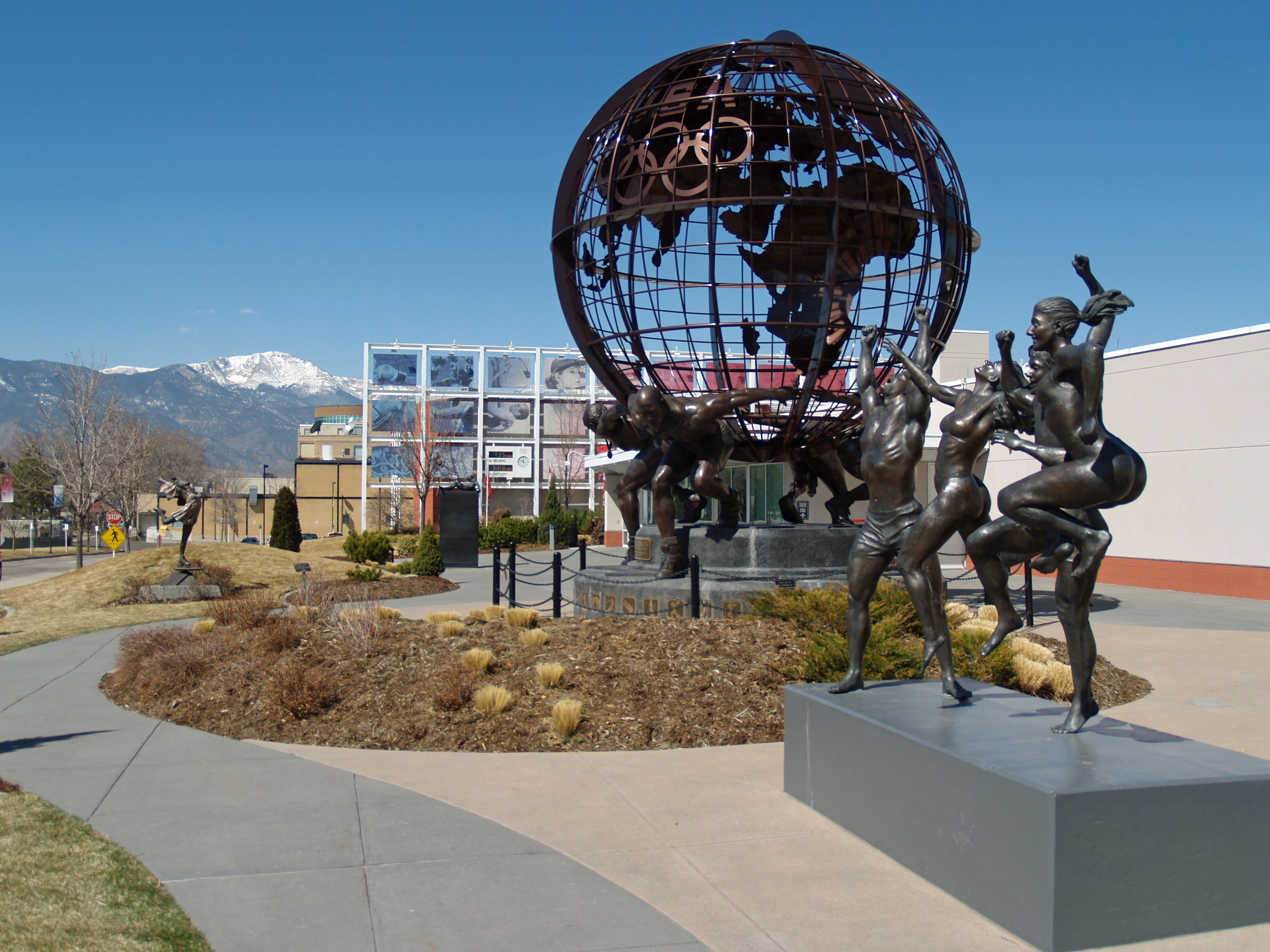
U.S. Olympic Committee headquarters in Colorado Springs, Colorado.

A lawyer representing the SFAA rued the ruling, noting that "Olympics" had been applied to contests involving rats and cockroaches and saying, "I guess the moral is that if you're gay, in the next life you'd better be born a rat if you want to use the word 'Olympic'."

Based upon the earlier injunction, the SFAA had renamed its project, redoing its posters, literature, and T-shirts, and conducted the first Gay Games in San Francisco from August 28 to September 2, 1982. It drew 1,300 people from 12 countries. Gay Games II had taken place in August 1986, and indeed among the 3,500 athletes participating in it was SFAA attorney Dunlap, a goalkeeper. Former U.S. Olympian Tom Waddell, who was the founder of the Gay Games, died of AIDS complications on July 11, 1987, a few months after the Supreme Court decision.

The Gay Games retains many similarities with the Olympics, including the Gay Games flame which is lit at the opening ceremony. The USOC issued "Guidelines for Using Olympic Symbols, Marks, and Terminology". Although the Gay Games have been conducted in many countries since 1982, they have not tried to use the word "Olympics" in those other countries. This is consistent with the existence of special trademark laws in countries other than the United States that also give special protection to the Olympic movement.

In the years since the lawsuit, the Olympics and the Gay Games have set aside their initial hostilities and worked cooperatively together, successfully lobbying to have HIV travel restrictions waived for the 1994 Gay Games in New York and the 1996 Summer Olympics in Atlanta.

A 2009 documentary film called Claiming the Title: Gay Olympics on Trial was created in the United States and was previewed at several film festivals. The subject was also included in a 2005 film by David Sector, called Take the Flame! Gay Games: Grace Grit & Glory.

== See also ==
- List of United States Supreme Court cases, volume 483
- List of United States Supreme Court cases
- Lists of United States Supreme Court cases by volume
- List of United States Supreme Court cases by the Rehnquist Court
