= Stade Jean-Bouin (Paris) =

Multi-purpose stadium in Paris, France

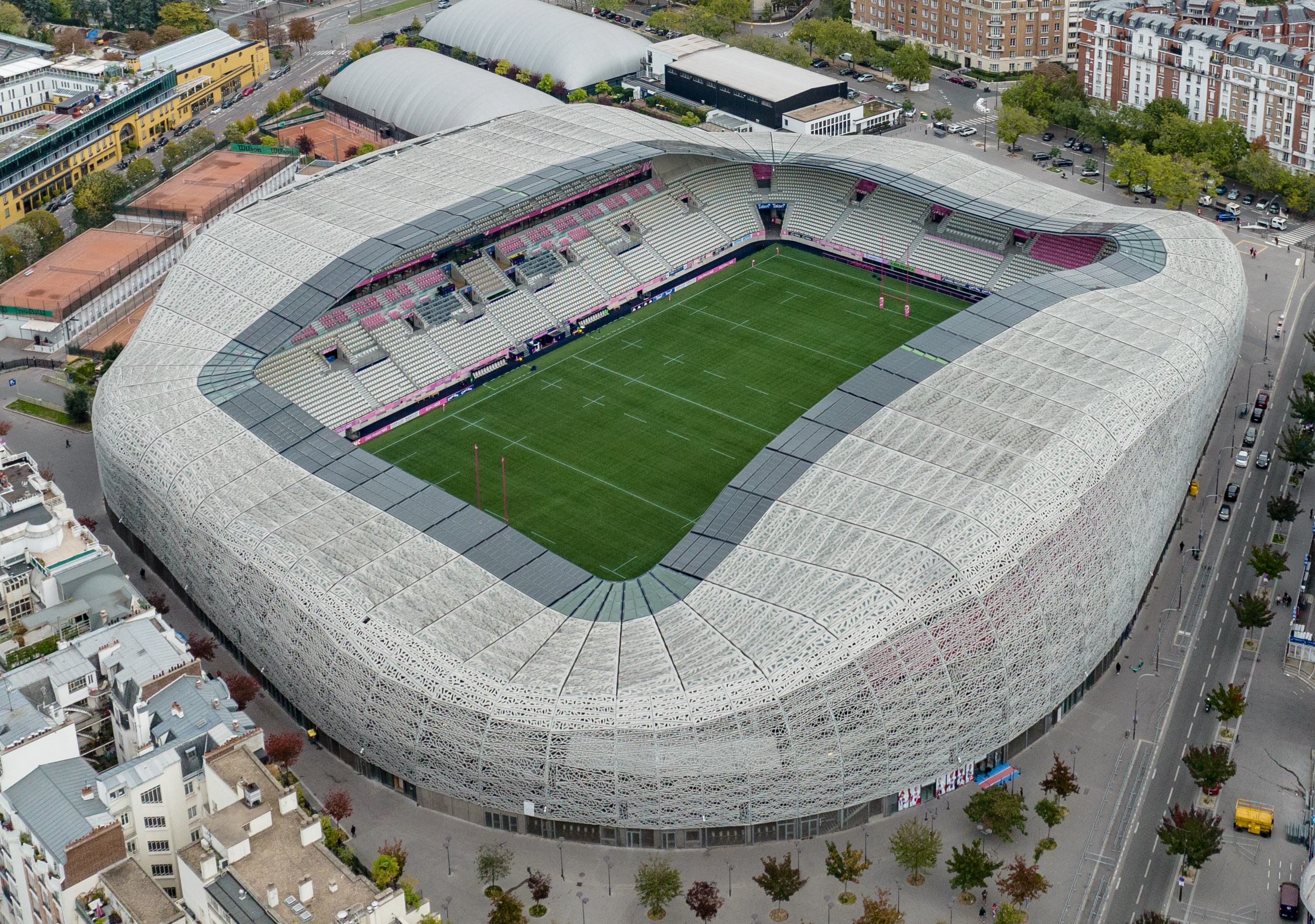
- Aerial view of the stadium.
- Interactive map of Stade Jean-Bouin
- Address: 20-40 Avenue du Général Sarrail
- Location: 75016 Paris, Île-de-France, France
- Coordinates: 48°50′35″N 2°15′10″E
- Owner: Mairie de Paris
- Capacity: 20,000
- Surface: Artificial turf
- Field size: 100 m × 70 m (109.4 yd × 76.6 yd)
- Public transit: Porte de Saint-Cloud

Construction
- Opened: October 1925
- Expanded: 1975, 2011
- Architect: Rudy Ricciotti

Tenants
- Current: Stade Français (1995–present); Paris FC (2025–present); Former: CASG Paris (1925–1995); Red Star FC (2016–2017); Paris Saint-Germain Féminine (2018–2024); FC Versailles 78 (2022–2025); Paris Musketeers (2023–2024)

The Stade Jean-Bouin (French pronunciation: [stad ʒɑ̃ bwɛ̃]; lit. 'Jean Bouin Stadium') is a multi-purpose stadium in the 16th arrondissement of Paris, France. The 20,000 capacity facility serves as the home stadium for rugby union team Stade Français and association football club Paris FC. The stadium is located across the street from the Parc des Princes.

== History ==
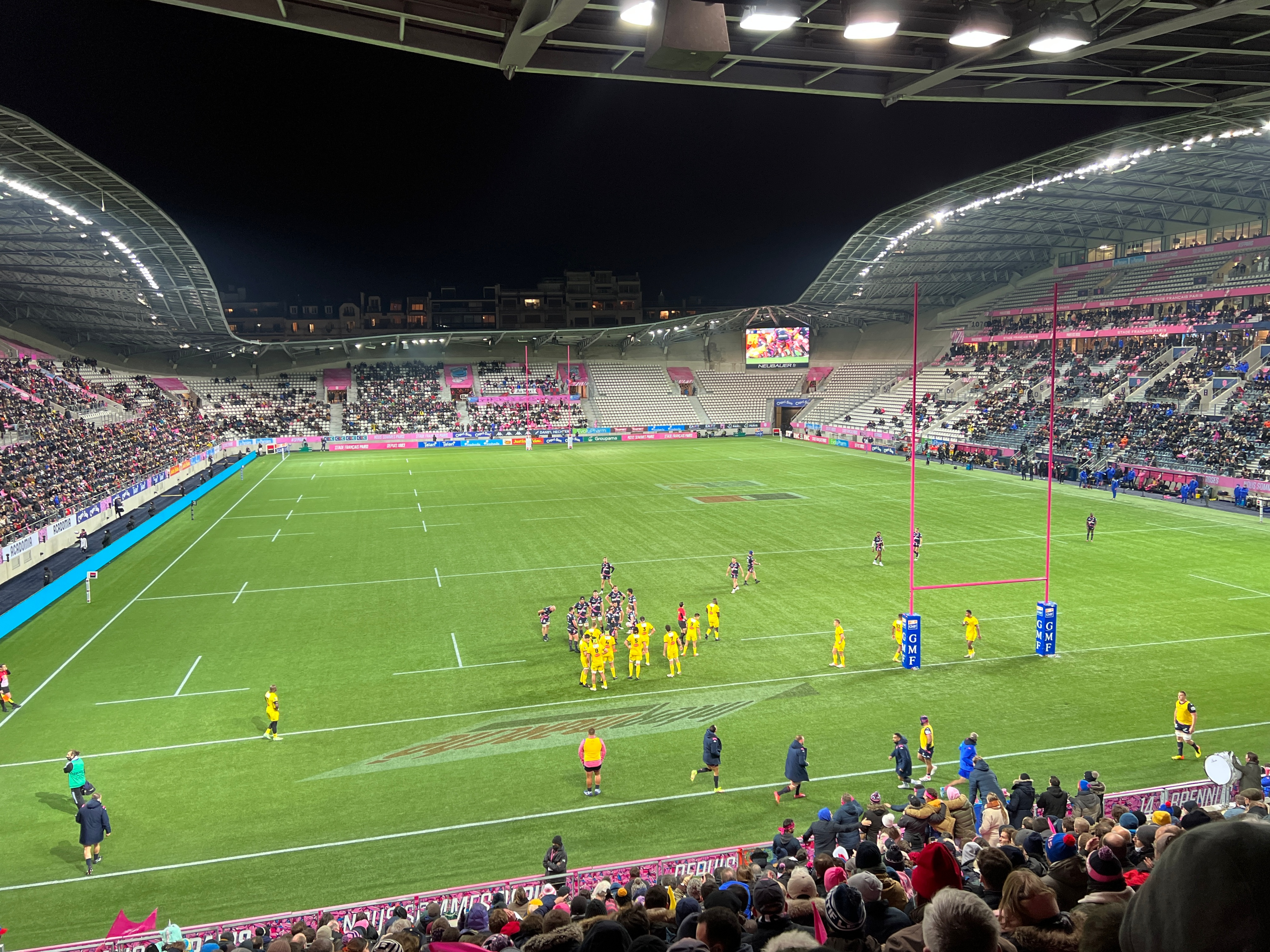
The stadium during a Stade Français game, looking towards the west.

The stadium was opened in October 1925, and is named after the athlete Jean Bouin, the 5000 metre silver medalist from the 1912 Olympics. It was the venue for the France Sevens leg of the World Rugby Sevens Series in 2005, 2006, and 2017–20. Before its temporary closure for an expansion project that began in summer 2010, it seated 12,000 people, The stadium reopened in 2013 with seating for 20,000 spectators. To accommodate the expansion, Stade Français moved its primary home ground to Stade Sébastien Charléty, also in Paris, for 2010–11. Stade Jean-Bouin hosted the semi-finals, third-place match, and final of the 2014 Women's Rugby World Cup. Since 2018, the Paris Saint-Germain Féminines football team also plays its home matches at Stade Jean-Bouin. Stade Jean-Bouin hosted the opening ceremony of the 2018 Gay Games written and directed by Rodolph Nasillski.

In March 2023, the American Football team Paris Musketeers announced that they would host their home games for the 2023 European League of Football season at Stade Jean-Bouin.

In February 2025, then Ligue 2 side Paris FC announced that they would be playing at the Stade Jean-Bouin from the 2025–26 season onward. The club also earned promotion to Ligue 1 for that season.

In July 2025, rugby league side Catalans Dragons announced they would move their 2026 home fixture against Wigan Warriors to the Stade Jean-Bouin in the French capital. This was done in celebration of the club's 20 year participation of competing in the Super League, in addition to celebrating 30 years of French clubs competing in the British rugby league system.
