= International Gay Figure Skating Union =

Figure skating governing body at the Gay Games

The International Gay Figure Skating Union (IGFSU) is currently the international governing body for figure skating at the Gay Games. Established in 1991 by Laura Moore and Arthur Luiz, the IGFSU sanctioned the figure skating events at the Gay Games beginning with the 1994 Games IV in New York. The IGFSU has formed relations with the Ice Sports Industry ((ISI) and the International Skating Union (ISU). The IGFSU states on its website that the organization “strive[s] to support LGBTQ+ skaters, coaches, [and] judges...[and] encourages skaters to lobby their country's governing bodies to become more inclusive.”

== History ==
Laura Moore skated on a same-sex team with her partner Linda Carney when she proposed the addition of figure skating events to the Gay Games. Although her request was initially denied due to doubts that figure skating events would be successful during the summer Gay Games, her efforts eventually succeeded and she, along with Arthur Luiz, established the International Gay Figure Skating Union to sanction the figure skating events. The IGFSU hosted figure skating for the first time at the 1994 Gay Games in New York, which Moore deemed a “landmark event,” as it allowed her and her partner to participate in a Gay Games competition. The IGFSU experienced relatively low activity for several years until it rebounded during the lead-up to the 1998 Gay Games in Amsterdam, but complications between the Amsterdam organizers, the ISU, and the IGFSU led to its cancellation. In October 1999, the IGFSU joined the Federation of Gay Games as an Organizational Director. In August 2001, the IGFSU partnered with the Ice Skating Industry (ISI), and saw its first collaboration with the International Skating Union (ISU) in 2018 for the Paris Gay Games X.

== Figure skating at the Gay Games ==
The International Gay Figure Skating Union has sanctioned the figure skating events at the following Gay Games:

- Gay Games IV, New York 1994
- Gay Games V, Amsterdam 1998 (competition canceled; held as exhibition)
- Gay Games VI, Sydney 2002
- Gay Games VII, Chicago 2006
- Gay Games VIII, Cologne 2010
- Gay Games IX, Cleveland 2014
- Gay Games X, Paris 2018
- Gay Games XI, Guadalajara 2023

=== Amsterdam Gay Games V ===
At the 1998 Gay Games in Amsterdam, the ISU refused a last-minute sanction request because same-gender teams violated the ISU definition of a team as one man and one lady. After ISU officials threatened punishment against its members (both skaters and judges), including a permanent ban from the ISU if they participated in the Gay Games events, the figure skating competition was forced to be canceled and was instead held as an exhibition and open practice. However, Moore argued that the cancellation of the competition was not the fault of the ISU, but rather the Amsterdam organizers for ever requesting a sanction from the ISU, especially on such short notice. Moore stated, “It was inappropriate for them ever to apply for a sanction because a Gay Games competition cannot fit into the structure of the ISU." As a result of the ISU's refusal to sanction the games, some interpretations presented the act as homophobic rather than a genuine inability to sanction an event at the last minute, such as an NBC Sports article claiming that the ISU refused to sanction the event because same-gender teams would contradict the ISU rulebook.

=== Paris Gay Games X ===
The Paris 2018 Gay Games is notable for its collaboration with the ISU for the first time in its history. After the disappointing cancellation of the figure skating events at the Amsterdam Gay Games, the IGFSU did not attempt further collaboration with the ISU until the lead-up to the Gay Games X in Paris. Although skaters expressed concerns that collaboration with the ISU would result in the removal of same-sex team events, IGFSU founder Laura Moore provided reassurance that they would not allow the Gay Games to exclude participation from same-sex teams. As a result, the IGFSU, the Federation of Gay Games, and the French Federation of Ice Sports formed a compromise: the French Federation of Ice Sports agreed to sanction part of the event using ISU rules, while the IGFSU sanctioned the other half of the competition using ISI rules. Although the ISU did not sanction the events, it agreed not to take disciplinary action against its members who participated, which elicited positive reactions. Alan Lessik, a local skater with the IGFSU, stated, “The International Gay Figure Skating Union is very excited about this change,” while Roger Brigham wrote that the breakthrough with ISU for the Paris Gay Games “signal[ed] the end to a heart-wrenching battle that has waged since the 1998 Gay Games in Amsterdam." Bradley Erickson, the president of the IGFSU at the time, said, “My biggest hope is that it feels like a natural add-on to the traditional Gay Games experience."

=== Guadalajara Gay Games XI ===
The most recent Gay Games took place in Guadalajara on November 8-10, 2023. The figure skating competition was held in Pista de Hielo Bugambilias and was run by the IGFSU under ISI rules. Skaters were required to obtain an ISI membership and follow the ISI guidelines for programs if coming from the ISU.

== Relationships with ISU/ISI ==
The International Gay Figure Skating Union has historically experienced a complicated relationship with the ISU, especially following the conflict between the two organizations that led to the cancelation of the figure skating competition at the Amsterdam Gay Games. Currently, the IGFSU's website states that “they are open to collaboration with the International Skating Union." However, in hopes of promoting LGBTQ+ acceptance and inclusion, they have tended to favor collaboration with organizations such as the Ice Sports Industry (ISI). In August 2001, the IGFSU officially became an administrative member of the ISI. In an August 2001 newsletter, the IGFSU stated, “Without hesitation, from our first contact with ISI, they have been enthusiastic about having us on board." ISI's emphasis on inclusivity aligned with IGFSU's goals. In particular, the ISI's addition of a “Couples” discipline (any two skaters regardless of gender) allowed for same-gender teams to compete at the Gay Games, in contrast with the ISU's strict definition of “team” as one man and one lady, dating back to the 1950s. Furthermore, ISI does not apply gender-based restrictions on costuming, in contrast to ISU and USFSA rules at the time, which stated that men had to wear full-length trousers and women had to wear skirts. Despite collaboration with ISI, many skaters were members of the ISU and still faced the risk of disciplinary action for participation in the Gay Games, ending only with the Paris 2018 Gay Games.

Recent interest has surfaced in allowing for same-gender teams following Skate Canada's redefinition of “team” as “Partner A and Partner B,” but the ISU's definition of “team” as one man and one woman currently remains in place. At an ISU meeting about six months after Skate Canada's announcement, ice dancer Kaitlyn Weaver asked if the ISU was planning to incorporate a similar revision to its gender rules. Shawn Rettstatt, the ISU technical committee chair, stated that the ISU had begun to form plans for revision, which would be voted on by members at the ISU International Congress.

== Barriers to LGBTQ+ participation in figure skating ==
Although Skate Canada's rulebook change to allow for same-gender teams received positive feedback, others have feared that “the sport was repositioning itself as a grooming area for gay pedophiles." It has also been pointed out that biases may come from figure skating's history as an “aesthetic” sport. Especially in ice dance, a discipline that is heavily artistry-based, skaters often choose a program with a romantic theme, and “a team's perceived chemistry seems to influence scoring." Mary Louise Adams suggested marketability as another barrier to LGBTQ+ participation when she wrote, “Skating is being straightened up. The straighter it gets, the more marketable its skaters become." Furthermore, a writer for the Toronto Star has stated concerns about fair play, as "man-man pairs would create a competitive advantage" if allowed to compete against male-female teams.

== See also ==
- IGFSU
- ISI
- ISU
- Federation of Gay Games
