= 2023 Gay Games =

LGBTQ multi-sport event in Hong Kong and Mexico

Gay Games 11 Hong Kong – Guadalajara 2023
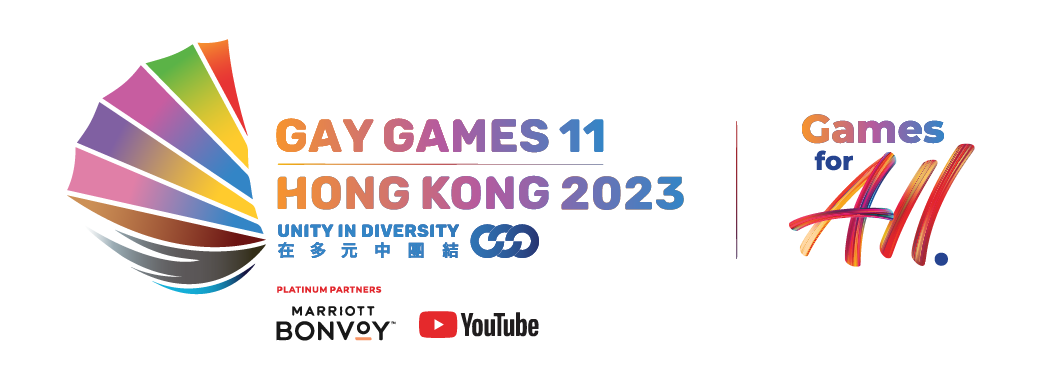
- Host city: Hong Kong and Guadalajara, Mexico
- Motto: Unity in Diversity 在多元中團結; GGHK Games for All. Juntos Creando Historia
- Edition: 11th
- Sports: Hong Kong: Badminton, Dodgeball, Dragon Boat Racing, Field Hockey, Fencing, Football (Soccer), Marathon: Full & Half, Open Water Swimming, Swimming, Road Races: 5 km & 10km, Mah Jong, Martial Arts, Rowing, Rugby Sevens, Sailing, Squash, Table Tennis, Tennis, Trail Running
- Events: 36 sports & Arts & Culture events
- Opening: 3 November 2023
- Closing: 11 November 2023
- Website: gghk2023.com/en/

The XI Gay Games 2023, also known as Gay Games 11, GGHK2023, GGGDL2023 and Hong Kong – Guadalajara Gay Games 2023, were an international multi-sport event and cultural gathering organised by, but not limited to lesbian, gay, bisexual, and transgender (LGBTQ+) athletes, artists and musicians, known as the Gay Games. It was held from 3 to 11 November 2023, in both Hong Kong and Guadalajara, Mexico.

Originally planned to take place from 11 to 19 November 2022, it was eventually rescheduled as a result of the COVID-19 pandemic in Hong Kong.

== Bidding process ==
In 2014, Dennis Philipse (a Dutch citizen living in Hong Kong for a long time) founded the community group "OUT in HK" to build an active community in Hong Kong. He remembered the 1998 Gay Games in Amsterdam and dreamed of bringing the Gay Games to Asia for the first time in its 40-year history. In 2014, he approached the Gay Games Federation to join the bidding process and built the volunteer organization GGHK from the ground up. The bidding process included the submission of a 300-page bid book proposal. After being shortlisted against Washington, D.C., and Guadalajara, Mexico, in March 2017, all shortlisted cities organized a four-day inspection visit for inspectors in May 2017. In October 2017, each shortlisted city had to make its final presentations in Paris, followed by voting and the announcement of the winner. Hong Kong was announced as the host city of the 11th Gay Games, at a gala event at the Hotel de Ville in Paris, on 30 October 2017. They won with a clear majority of votes, in the first round of voting by the delegates of the Federation of Gay Games. It is the first time that the Gay Games will be held in Asia.

The "longlist" of cities interested in bidding to host Gay Games XI in 2022 was announced in April 2016. An unprecedented seventeen cities were interested in bidding. On 30 June 2016, the Federation of Gay Games announced that eleven cities had submitted their Letter Of Intent to formally bid. Anaheim, Atlanta, Des Moines, Madison, Minneapolis and San Antonio decided not to pursue their option to bid. On 31 July 2016, nine cities submitted their second registration fee to remain in the bid process. Both Cape Town and Tel Aviv dropped out at this stage, stating an intention to bid for Gay Games XII in 2026. On 30 November 2016, Bid Books were submitted by eight candidate cities with Los Angeles dropping out at this stage.

A shortlist of three Candidate Cities was announced on 1 March 2017. Guadalajara, Hong Kong and Washington, DC, hosted site visits before the final decision on the host city was made in Paris on Monday 30 October.

On 14 February 2022, Guadalajara was added as the co-host of this games.

Shortlisted Candidate Cities
Hong Kong (original host)
(Mexico) Guadalajara (co-host)
(United States) Washington DC
Longlisted Candidate Cities
(United States) Austin, TX
(United States) Dallas, TX
(United States) Denver, CO
(United States) Salt Lake City, UT
(United States) San Francisco, CA

Dropout Candidate Cities
(United States) Anaheim, CA
(United States) Atlanta, GA
(South Africa) Cape Town
(United States) Des Moines, IA
(United States) Los Angeles, CA
(United States) Madison, WI
(United States) Minneapolis, MN
(Israel) Tel Aviv

== Postponement and co-hosting ==
In September 2021, the organisers announced that the 2022 Gay Games would be postponed one year, to November 2023, due to the ongoing COVID-19 pandemic and Hong Kong's strict travel quarantine protocols.

Due to the uncertain situation in Hong Kong, in February 2022, after 7 years (of which the last 2 years full-time) in volunteer capacity, Dennis Philipse stepped down from his role as leader to focus on his professional life. The decision was also made to co-host the Gay Games 11 event between Hong Kong and Guadalajara (Mexico), as Guadalajara was the 2nd winner running up. The two cities held nearly half of the sports competitions of the games.

== Opening ceremony ==
The opening ceremony was originally scheduled for 11 November 2022, before being postponed to 3 November 2023. It was held in Hong Kong at the Queen Elizabeth Stadium in the Wan Chai area. A March-in parade was held, with the GGHK Hosting Committee leading the march, followed by the board of the Federation of Gay Games, representatives of the city of San Francisco which hosted the first Gay Games, athletes from participating nations, and representatives of Hong Kong. The event was not open to the public. A lion dance was also held with an intro short film. The following speakers spoke:

- FGG Co-president Joanie Evans spoke on behalf of the FGG,
- Convenor of the Executive Council Regina Ip on behalf of the Hong Kong SAR government
- Co-chair Alan Lang speaking on behalf of the GGHK Hosting Committee
- Pablo Macedo Riva, Consul General for Mexico in Hong Kong and Macau
- FGG Vice President of Programming Yann Schneider to bestow the FGG Tom Waddell Award to Roger Brigham of Oakland, California USA and Emy Ritt of Paris, France.
- GGHK Director of Badminton Donald Tim to officiate the Officials Oath
- GGHK Director of Football Avery Fung to officiate the Athletes Oath

Musical performances were also performed on stage.

== Events and venues ==
The games featured 22 sport together with arts & culture events throughout Hong Kong.

In June 2023, The Hong Kong Free Press reported that track and field events, field hockey and Rugby 7s were to be removed from the programme after low registration numbers.

=== Sports ===
==== Guadalajara ====
- Athletics
- Athletics 5k-10k
- Athletics Marathon and Half
- Badminton
- Basketball
- Beach Volleyball
- Bowling
- Cheerleading
- Dance Sport
- Diving
- Dodgeball
- Figure Skating
- Football Elevens
- Football Sevens
- Golf
- Powerlifting
- Softball
- Swimming
- Tennis
- Volleyball
- Water Polo
- Wrestling

==== Hong Kong ====
- Trial Running
- Tennis
- Table Tennis
- Swimming
- Squash
- Rowing
- Road Race 10k
- Road Race 5k
- Open Water Swimming
- Martial Arts
- Marathon Half
- Marathon Full
- Mahjong
- Football (Soccer)
- Fencing
- Dragon Boat
- Dodgeball
- Badminton

== Participating nations ==
- Australia
- Austria
- Barbados
- Cambodia
- Canada
- Chile
- Chinese Taipei
- Denmark
- France
- Germany
- Great Britain
- Greece
- India
- Ireland
- Italy
- Japan
- Kazakhstan
- Kenya
- Malaysia
- Netherlands
- New Zealand
- Nigeria
- Norway
- Philippines
- Serbia
- Singapore
- South Africa
- South Korea
- Spain
- Switzerland
- Trinidad and Tobago
- USA

== Controversies ==
=== National Security Law enforcement ===
In 2021, the Taiwanese delegation announced that they will not send their athletes to the 2022 Gay Games for fear that members of the team could be arrested under the Hong Kong national security law, enacted in 2020.

In June 2023, 5 prominent Hong Kong human rights activists call for the Gay Games to be canceled citing concerns for safety of LGBTQ participants after a crack down on protests under the Hong Kong national security law. The activists criticised the organisers of the event saying "the GGHK leadership team has betrayed the values and principles of the Gay Games, which purport to celebrate inclusion and promote human rights. Instead, they have aligned themselves with pro-authoritarian figures responsible for widespread persecution against the people of Hong Kong.".

In October 2023, seven Hong Kong lawmakers said they thought that the Gay Games may infringe on the national security law and called for the 2023 Gay Games to be banned in Hong Kong.

== See also ==
- Federation of Gay Games, the sanctioning body of the Gay Games
- Principle 6 campaign
