= Mary C. Dunlap =

American lawyer (1948–2003)

- Born: May 25, 1948; Napa, California
- Died: January 17, 2003 (aged 54)
- Occupation: Lawyer

Mary Cynthia Dunlap (May 25, 1948 – January 17, 2003) was an American civil rights lawyer based in San Francisco, California. She directed San Francisco's Office of Citizen Complaints (OCC).

== Early life and education ==
Dunlap was born in Napa, California, the daughter of Frank Leslie Dunlap and Betty Marion McBean Dunlap. Her father was a lawyer. She attended Napa High School, earned a bachelor's degree at the University of California, Berkeley in 1968, and completed a Juris Doctor degree at UC Berkeley School of Law in 1971. In law school, she and other students founded the Boalt Hall Women's Association, and took over a restroom for the association's office.

== Career ==
In 1973, Dunlap co-founded of a non-profit law firm specializing in sex discrimination law, Equal Rights Advocates, with Wendy Webster Williams and Nancy Davis. In 1976 she debated Phyllis Schlafly on the Equal Rights Amendment at Mills College. In 1977, she represented a pregnant teacher forced to take maternity leave in Berg v. Richmond Unified School District. In 1984, she represented women in a class-action suit against laundries for discriminatory price differences between services for men's and women's clothing, saying "ring-around-the-collar ought to cost the same to remove, whether a man or a woman put it there". In 1987, she represented the Gay Games before the Supreme Court, in San Francisco Arts & Athletics, Inc. v. United States Olympic Committee. In 1989, she represented Eleanor Swift in her lawsuit against Boalt Hall over tenure. She supported Black firefighters in a civil rights challenge to the San Francisco Fire Department's hiring practices. She was involved in the early work of the National Center for Lesbian Rights.

Dunlap was appointed director of San Francisco's Office of Citizen Complaints in 1996. In that role, she oversaw the office that investigated complaints against city police officers. She taught at the Hastings College of Law, Golden Gate University, Stanford University, and the University of San Francisco School of Law.

== Publications ==
- "The Equal Rights Amendment and the Courts" (1975)
- "The Constitutional Rights of Sexual Minorities: A Crisis of the Male/Female Dichotomy" (1978)
- "Attorneys' Fees against Government Defendants; Economics Requires a New Proposal" (1979)
- "Harris v. McRae" (1979)
- "Toward Recognition of A Right to Be Sexual" (1981)
- "Feminist Discourse, Moral Values, and the Law—A Conversation" (1985, with Ellen C. DuBois, Carol Gilligan, Catharine A. MacKinnon, and Carrie Menkel-Meadow)
- "Sexual Speech and the State: Putting Pornography in Its Place" (1987)
- "The F Word: Mainstreaming and Marginalizing Feminism" (1988)
- "AIDS and Discrimination in the United States: Reflections on the Nature of Prejudice in a Virus" (1989)
- "The Lesbian and Gay Marriage Debate: A Microcosm of Our Hopes and Troubles in the Nineties" (1991)
- "Are We Integrated Yet? Pursuing the Complex Question of Values, Demographics and Personalities" (1994)
- "Gay Men and Lesbians down by Law in the 1990's USA: The Continuing Toll of Bowers v. Hardwick " (1994)

Dunlap also wrote and published her poetry. Andrew Sullivan included one of her poems in his Same-Sex Marriage, Pro and Con: A Reader (1997).

== Personal life and legacy ==
Dunlap was diagnosed with pancreatic cancer in 2001, and kept an online journal of her treatment and experiences; she died in 2003, at the age of 54, survived by her partner of almost 18 years, Maureen Mason. In 2004, the Berkeley Women's Law Journal dedicated a special issue to tributes to Dunlap. In 2005, the first Mary Dunlap Fellowships were awarded at Berkeley, and the first Mary C. Dunlap Memorial Lecture on Sex, Gender & Social Justice was held. Her work with the Gay Games is featured in the documentary Claiming the Title: Gay Olympics on Trial (2009).
