= 2018 Gay Games =

LGBT multi-sport event in Paris, France

X Gay Games Paris 2018
- Host city: Paris
- Country: France
- Motto: All equal
- Nations: 91
- Athletes: 10,317
- Events: 36 sports
- Opening: August 4, 2018
- Closing: August 12, 2018
- Main venue: Stade Jean-Bouin
- Website: www.paris2018.com

The 2018 Gay Games, also known as Gay Games 10 or Gay Games X, were an international multi-sport event and cultural gathering organized by, and specifically for lesbian, gay, bisexual, and transgender (LGBT) athletes, artists and musicians. It was held from August 4 to August 12, 2018, in Paris, France. Approximately 10,000 athletes from 91 nations participated in 36 sports and cultural events. It was the first time they took place in a French-speaking city. The motto was All Equal.

It was an international sporting and cultural event, which was intended to be open to everyone. The objective was to fight against all forms of discrimination (sexual orientation, gender identity, disability) through the practice of sport, to show the diversity of the LGBT community and the general population. 40,000 visitors were expected.

The 2018 Gay Games were estimated to have boosted the economy of Paris by $118m.

== Bidding process ==
On July 31, 2012, the FGG announced that seven cities had been approved as prospective bidders. The groups were from Amsterdam, Netherlands; Limerick, Ireland; London, United Kingdom; Orlando, Florida, United States; Paris, France; and a group proposing to host the Gay Games in either Rio de Janeiro or São Paulo, Brazil.

By August 31, 2012, letters of intent to bid had been received from all groups except those in Brazil. In December 2012, the FGG announced that several requests from bidders to add new sports to the program of the games. Of these requests, that for the inclusion of polo was rejected, while those for archery, boxing, fencing, pétanque, roller derby and wheelchair rugby were approved. Of these, boxing, pétanque, roller derby and wheelchair rugby were included in the bids of the three finalist bidding organizations.

Bid books were provided by February 28, 2013, with a Q&A held over April and May 2013. A shortlisting vote took place on May 31, 2013, resulting in the shortlisting of Limerick, London and Paris as the final three cities to continue on the 2018 Bid cycle. Shortlisted cities received a 4-day visit (inspection sites) from a team of FGG inspectors (4 delegates + 1 CM) in July 2013. The final vote took place in Cleveland (Ohio, USA) during the 2013 Annual General Assembly. On 7 October, Paris was elected host city for the 2018 Gay Games.

Shortlisted Cities
Paris, France
(Republic of Ireland) Limerick, Ireland
London, United Kingdom
Non-Shortlisted Cities
Amsterdam, Netherlands
Orlando, United States

The bid committee obtained the support of the Minister of Sports Valérie Fourneyron, the Mayor of Paris, Anne Hidalgo and the President of the Île-de-France Region Jean-Paul Huchon, as well as the Olympic champion Laura Flessel. The official launch took place on October 2, 2017.

== Organization ==
=== Organizing Association ===
The event was organized by the "Paris 2018" association, created in 2012 and declared to be of general interest. It was co-chaired by Michel Geffroy (2012-February 2014) and Chris Fanuel (2012-May 2014), then Manuel Picaud (February 2014-March 2019) and Evelyne Chenoun (February–June 2015) and Pascale Reinteau (March 2017-March 2019). The association was dissolved in March 2019.

=== Finance ===
The organization had a planned cost of approximately 4 million € and the estimate of the economic benefits was 58 million €. Half of the financing was provided by crowdfunding, a quarter by the public authorities and the last quarter by a partnership with private companies. The head of sponsorship described the great difficulties he had in obtaining these few supports. The infrastructures were made available by the City of Paris as well as the State and the Île-de-France Region. The economic impact was calculated after the event by the independent institute of the University of Kent: the impact reached 66 million € to which must be added 41 million € of impact on employment, i.e. more than 100 million €.

== Opening ceremony ==
The community village on the forecourt of Hôtel de Ville, Paris was inaugurated on Saturday August 4 at 9 a.m. On this occasion, the International Memorial Rainbow Run took place, a race dedicated to victims of AIDS, breast cancer and discrimination.

The ceremony itself took place at the Stade Jean-Bouin from 5 p.m. There was the parade of athletes by nation and a big show around the theme of coming out and equality with the presence of Ada Vox, drag queen awarded in the United States. Were present in particular the mayor of Paris Anne Hidalgo, the Minister of Sports Laura Flessel and the couturier Jean-Paul Gaultier. It continued with a gala evening at the Grand Palais with DJ Offer Nissim.

Opening ceremony images

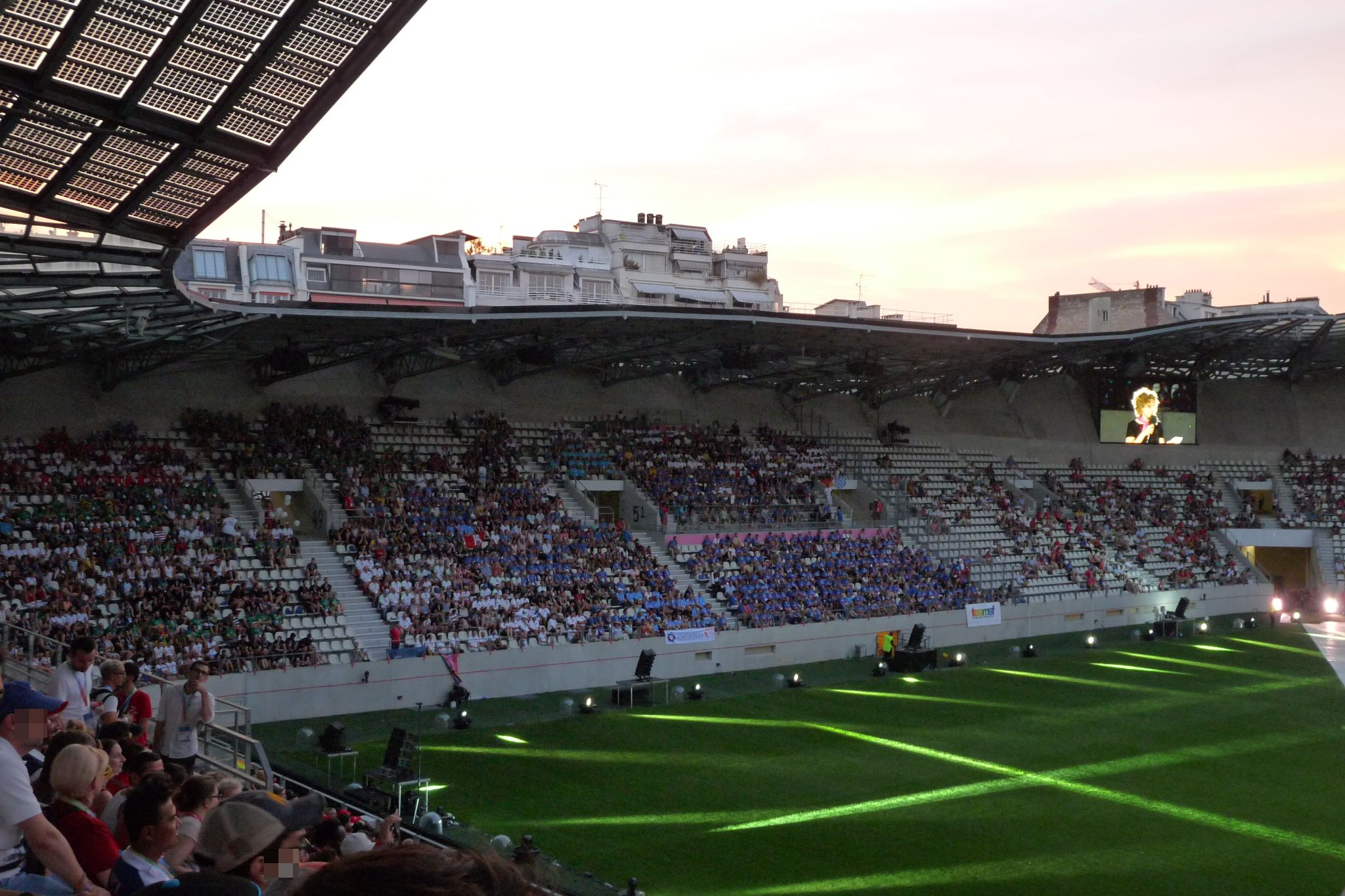

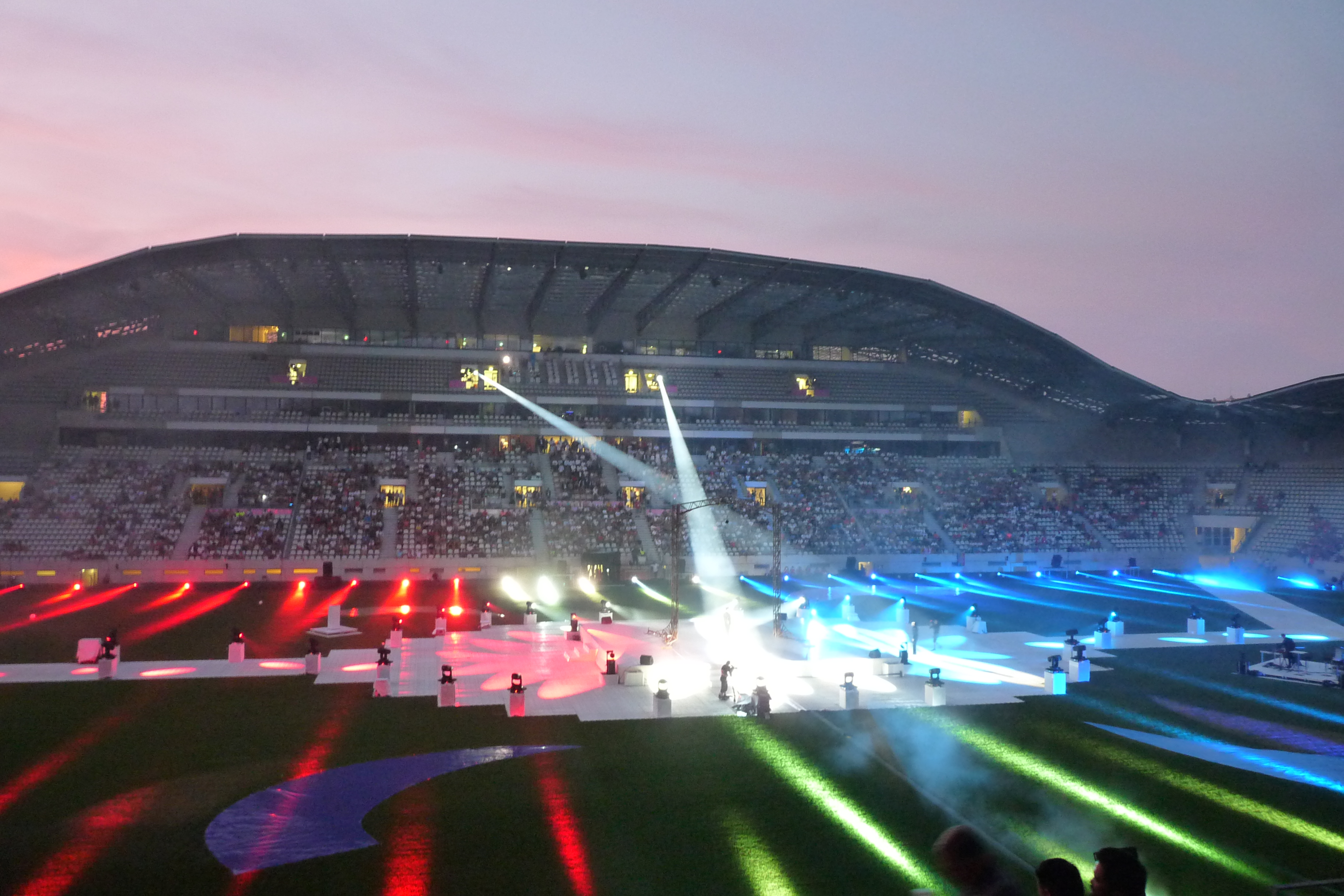

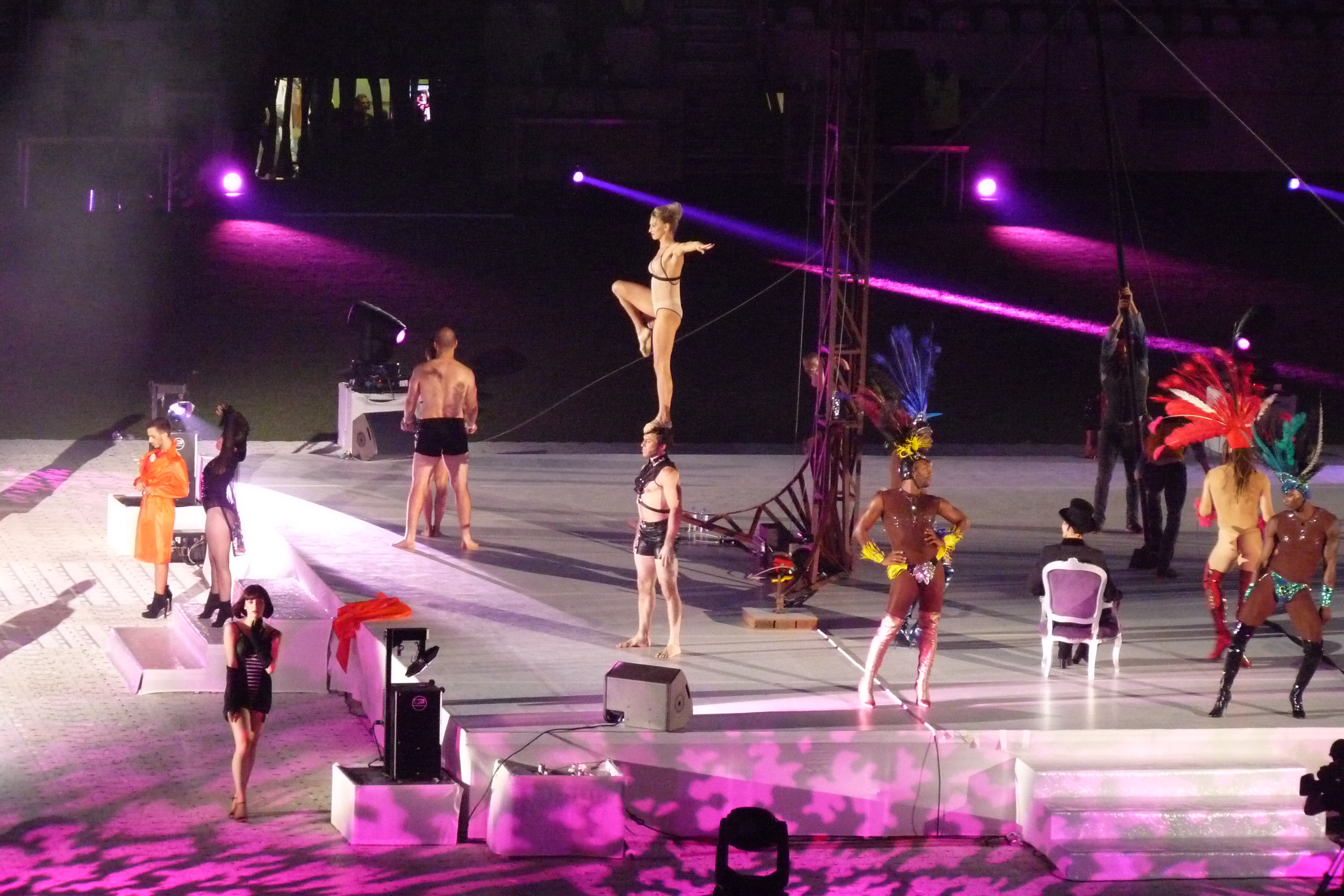

== Sport ==
The events concerned more than 36 sports disciplines. The objective of the events was the pleasure of sport, surpassing oneself, rather than performance. All participants get a medal.

The disciplines can be mixed, open to a gender that does not usually enter these competitions (for example synchronized swimming for men, with the participation of the Paris Aquatique association), or even original with the "pink flamingo".

For trans people, the registration (except in the discipline of wrestling) is under their chosen gender and not necessarily that of the civil status.

The events (participation and show) are accessible to people with disabilities. Teams composed of able-bodied and disabled people can exist as is the case for fencing.

The relevance of such an event can be compared with a 2018 Ifop survey for the Jaurès Foundation which gives the information that 19% of LGBT people have already been discriminated against in a sports club.

== Culture ==
14 cultural events were planned in the official program. In the Monday evening shows on the forecourt of the Hôtel de Ville, there was in particular a show by the magician Mandragore.

== Closing ceremony ==
It took place on the esplanade of the Hôtel de Ville on August 11 and was followed by a festive evening at the Docks de Paris.

== Attendees ==
10,300 participants from 91 nations on five continents were expected. Registrations were individual and not in the name of a national team.

Some participants come from countries where homosexuality is criminalized: Sierra Leone, Egypt, Russia, Saudi Arabia, etc.

The presence of a delegation from Taiwan caused some diplomatic turmoil.

== See also ==
- Federation of Gay Games, the sanctioning body of the Gay Games
- Gay Games
