= Mary Knight Dunlap =

Scientist and veterinarian

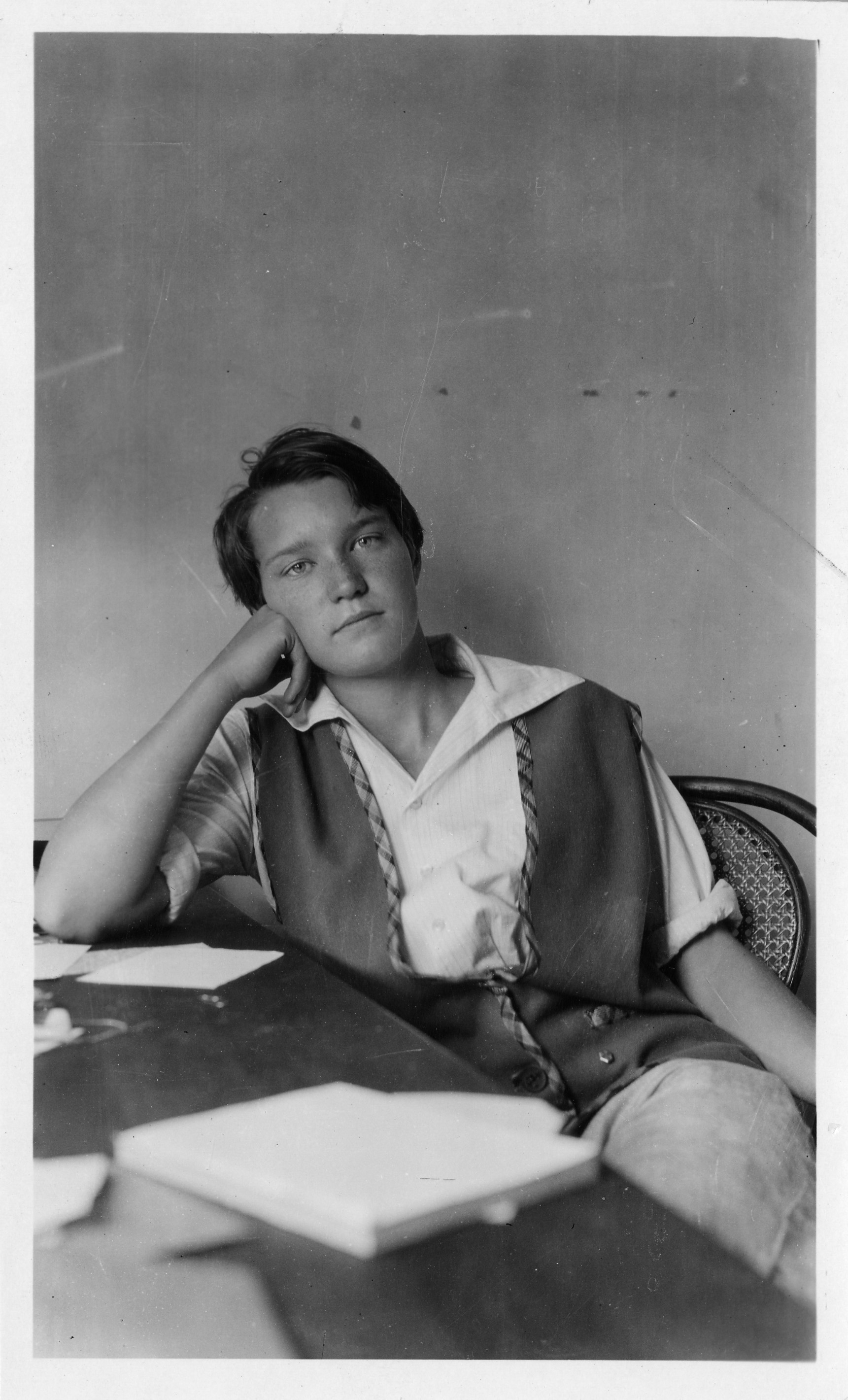
- Born: 1910
- Died: 1992 (aged 81–82)
- Education: Colorado A&M
- Scientific career
- Fields: Veterinary Medicine

Mary Knight Dunlap (1910–1992) founded the Association of Women Veterinarians in 1947.

Dunlap was from Baltimore, Maryland. In 1926, she began a four-year degree in veterinary medicine at Colorado A&M; however, she dropped out after her second year. She continued to pursue her interest in veterinary medicine and wrote abstracts and reports of meetings for the North American Veterinarian and other publications.

In 1947, Dunlap founded the Women's Veterinary Medical Association, now known as the Association of Women Veterinarians Foundation. She wrote, "through our organization we should offer guidance and help where it is needed, so that others will avoid our mistakes and most easily find happiness and success."

Dunlap edited and contributed to Dr. Joseph Arburua's book, Narrative of Veterinary Medicine in California. She worked in the toxicology department of the University of California, San Francisco College of Medicine until poor health led to her resignation.
