= Tom Waddell =

Founder of Gay Games (1937–1987)

Tom Waddell next to the original Gay Olympic Games poster, showing "Olympic" covered due to the lawsuit over the name

Tom Waddell (born Thomas Flubacher; November 1, 1937 – July 11, 1987) was an American medical doctor and decathlete who competed at the 1968 Summer Olympics, and founder of the Gay Olympics (later known as the Gay Games).

Adopted by former vaudeville acrobats, Waddell excelled in athletics and eventually attended medical school. He competed in the 1968 Summer Olympics, and after a career-ending injury, he started a successful medical practice in San Francisco. Inspired by his experience in a gay bowling league, Waddell founded the Gay Olympics, emphasizing sportsmanship, personal achievement, and inclusiveness. He also had a daughter with lesbian athlete Sara Lewinstein. Diagnosed with AIDS in 1985, Waddell died in 1987. His life and contributions to LGBTQ history have been posthumously honored in multiple ways.

== Early life ==
Waddell was born Thomas Flubacher in Paterson, New Jersey, to a Catholic German-American family. His parents separated when he was in his teens, and at the age of fifteen he went to live with Gene and Hazel Waddell, for whom he did chores; they adopted him six years later. The Waddells were former vaudeville acrobats and encouraged Tom to take up gymnastics. Gene Waddell is one of the men in the famous photograph of acrobats balancing atop the Empire State Building. In high school, Tom Waddell excelled in athletics.

Waddell attended Springfield College in Massachusetts on a track scholarship. Originally majoring in physical education, he switched to pre-medicine following the sudden death of his best friend and co-captain of the gymnastics team, an event that moved him deeply. At Springfield, he competed on the gymnastics and football teams. In the summer of 1959, Tom worked at a children's camp in western Massachusetts, where he met his first lover, socialist Enge Menaker, who was then 63 years . They remained close for the rest of Menaker's life, which ended in 1985 when he was 90 years old.

== Medical career ==
Waddell attended medical school at New Jersey College of Medicine, a division of Seton Hall University, and in 1965 undertook his medical internship at Beth El Hospital, Brooklyn. In 1965, he traveled from Brooklyn to participate in the civil rights movement in Selma, Alabama.

Drafted into the United States Army in 1966, Waddell became a preventive-medicine officer and paratrooper. Entering a course in global medicine, he protested when he found out that he would be deployed to Vietnam. Expecting a court-martial, he was instead sent to train as a decathlete for the 1968 Olympics.

After discharge from the army, Waddell undertook medical residencies at Georgetown University and Montefiore Medical Center. At Georgetown, he did research on viruses at the Walter Reed Army Medical Center in Washington, D.C. In 1970, he began a graduate fellowship at Stanford University.

Waddell established his private practice on 18th Street in the Castro District of San Francisco in 1974. He also served in the Middle East as medical director of the Whittaker Corporation from 1974 through 1981. Part of his job entailed serving as personal physician for a Saudi prince and a Saudi businessman and he eventually became the team physician for the Saudi Arabian Olympic team at the 1976 Summer Olympics.

Waddell was employed at the City Clinic in San Francisco's Civic Center area; after his death, it was renamed for him.

== Sporting career ==
He traveled on a United States Department of State-sponsored track and field tour of Africa in 1962.

At the 1968 Summer Olympics in Mexico City, Waddell placed sixth among the 33 competitors. He broke five of his own personal records in the 10 events.

In 1972, in a track meet in Hawaii, he injured his knee in a high jump, which ended his career as a competitive athlete.

== Gay Olympics ==
Soon after returning to San Francisco in 1972, Waddell joined a gay bowling league. It inspired him to consider organizing a gay sporting event modeled on the Olympics. He followed through with the idea in the early 1980s. The first Gay Olympics was to take place in San Francisco in 1982 in the form of a sports competition and arts festival. However, a few weeks before the event was to begin, the International Olympic Committee (IOC) sued Waddell's organization over its use of the word "Olympic."

Despite the IOC having not previously protested when other groups had used the name, they alleged that allowing "Gay Olympics" would injure them. They succeeded in securing an injunction nineteen days before the first games were to begin. The games, now renamed the "Gay Games," went forward.

== Personal life ==
While Waddell was working at Stanford University in 1970, he met Lee Bryan, with whom he had a five-year relationship.

In 1975, Waddell met landscape designer Charles Deaton, 12 years his senior, and they became lovers. An October 11, 1976 issue of People magazine featured the couple in a cover article. They were the first gay couple to appear on the cover of a major national magazine.

In 1981, while founding the Gay Games, Waddell met two people with whom he formed major relationships. One was public relations agent Zohn Artman, with whom he fell in love and began a relationship. The other was lesbian athlete Sara Lewinstein. Both Waddell and Lewinstein had wanted a child, and they decided to have one together. Their daughter, Jessica, was born in 1983. To protect Jessica's and her mother's legal rights, Waddell and Lewinstein married in 1985.

== Death ==
In 1985, Waddell was diagnosed with AIDS. He participated in Gay Games II in 1986, winning the gold medal in the javelin event. He died on July 11 the following year, aged 49, in San Francisco, California.

Waddell's battle against HIV/AIDS is one of the subjects of the award-winning 1989 documentary Common Threads: Stories from the Quilt. His autobiography, Gay Olympian, which he co-authored with sports writer Dick Schaap, was published in 1996.

== Tributes ==
In 2013, Waddell was inducted into the Legacy Walk, an outdoor public display which celebrates LGBT history and people.

In 2013, Waddell was inducted into the inaugural class of the Gay & Lesbian Sports Hall of Fame.

In 2014, a street in San Francisco formerly named after Lech Wałęsa was, due to a homophobic comment by Wałęsa, renamed Dr. Tom Waddell Place. The Tom Waddell Health Center had been located at the end of the street but in 2013 had been renamed the Tom Waddell Urban Health Center, combined with another health clinic, and relocated to a nearby location on Golden Gate Avenue.

In 2014, Waddell was one of the inaugural honorees in the Rainbow Honor Walk, a walk of fame in San Francisco's Castro District honoring LGBTQ people who have "made significant contributions in their fields."

== See also ==
- Homosexuality in modern sports
- LGBTQ people in sports in the United States
- Principle 6 campaign
