= Amateur Sports Act of 1978 =

1978 American amateur sporting law

- Long title: An Act to promote and coordinate amateur athletic activity in the United States, to recognize certain rights for United States amateur athletes, to provide for the resolution of disputes involving national governing bodies, and for other purposes.
- Nicknames: Ted Stevens Olympic and Amateur Sports Act
- Enacted by: the 95th United States Congress
- Effective: November 8, 1978

Citations
- Public law: 95-606
- Statutes at Large: 92 Stat. 3045

Codification
- Titles amended: 36 U.S.C.: Patriotic Societies and Observances
- U.S.C. sections amended: 36 U.S.C. ch. 2205 § 371; 36 U.S.C. ch. 2205 §§ 372-382b; 36 U.S.C. ch. 2205 §§ 391-396

Legislative history
- Introduced in the Senate as S. 2727 by Ted Stevens (R–AK) on March 10, 1978; Committee consideration by Senate Commerce, Science, and Transportation, House Judiciary; Passed the Senate on May 8, 1978 (Passed); Passed the House on October 13, 1978 (Passed) with amendment; Senate agreed to House amendment on October 14. 1978 (Passed); Signed into law by President Jimmy Carter on November 8, 1978

The Amateur Sports Act of 1978, signed by President Jimmy Carter, gave official recognition to the United States Olympic Committee (now United States Olympic & Paralympic Committee) and provides for national governing bodies for each Olympic sport. The Act provides important legal protection for individual athletes.

== Background ==
Prior to the adoption of the Act in 1978, the Amateur Athletic Union (AAU) represented the United States on international competition matters and regulated amateur sports generally. By default, it became the national arbiter of amateur standing – and thus eligibility – for U.S. entrants to the then supposedly "all-amateur" Olympic Games. Avery Brundage, who held similar declaratory power as IOC President from 1952 to 1972, had assumed the office after heading the AAU.

The AAU had adopted arbitrary rules which prohibited women from participating in running events and prohibited any runner who had raced in the same event as a runner with a shoe-company sponsorship. Congress adopted the Act in response to criticisms of the AAU, effectively removing that organization from any governance role.

The AAU now continues as a voluntary organization largely promoting youth sports. While it still has a major role in promoting track, it is now best known for sponsoring youth basketball competitions.

== Overview ==
The Act charters the U.S. Olympic Committee, which in turn can charter a national governing body (NGB) for each sport, such as USRowing, USA Swimming, the United States Fencing Association, the United States Ski Team, USA Track & Field, USA Shooting, or U.S. Figure Skating. Each NGB in turn establishes the rules for selecting the United States Olympic Team and promotes competition in that sport.

The Act requires that active athletes (defined as athletes who have represented the United States in international competition within the last ten years) must hold 20 percent of the voting power of any board or committee in an NGB. The Act also provides athletes with due process and appeal rights concerning eligibility disputes.

The Act gives exclusive rights of usage of the words Olympic and Olympiad to the Olympic Committee.

== 1998 revision ==
The Ted Stevens Olympic and Amateur Sports Act is a United States law (codified at 36 U.S.C. Sec. 220501 et seq. of the United States Code) that charters and grants monopoly status to the United States Olympic Committee, and specifies requirements for its member national governing bodies for individual sports.

The current version of the Act was sponsored by Ted Stevens, then-Senator from Alaska, and adopted in 1998. It is an update to the previous Amateur Sports Act of 1978 that considers changes like the elimination of the amateurism requirement for participation in most international sports (the admission of professionals was caused by the extensive cheating of the Soviet Union that listed its best pros as soldiers and broke the Olympic rules), expansion of the USOC's role to include the Paralympic Games, increased athlete representation, and protection of the USOC against lawsuits involving athletes' right to participate in the Olympic Games.

The United States Olympic Committee warned it would use the law against the "Redneck Olympics", prompting it to change its name to the Redneck Games; though it has given special dispensation to the Special Olympics.
