= Gay Games =

Worldwide multi-sport and cultural event

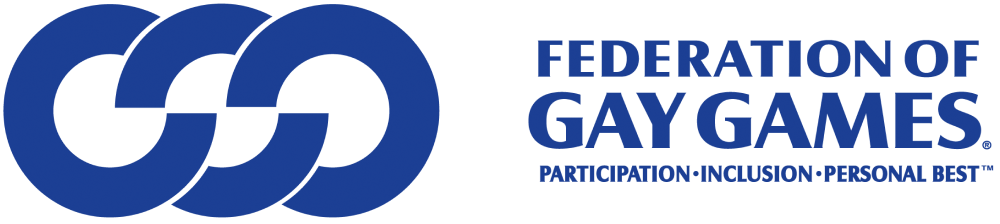

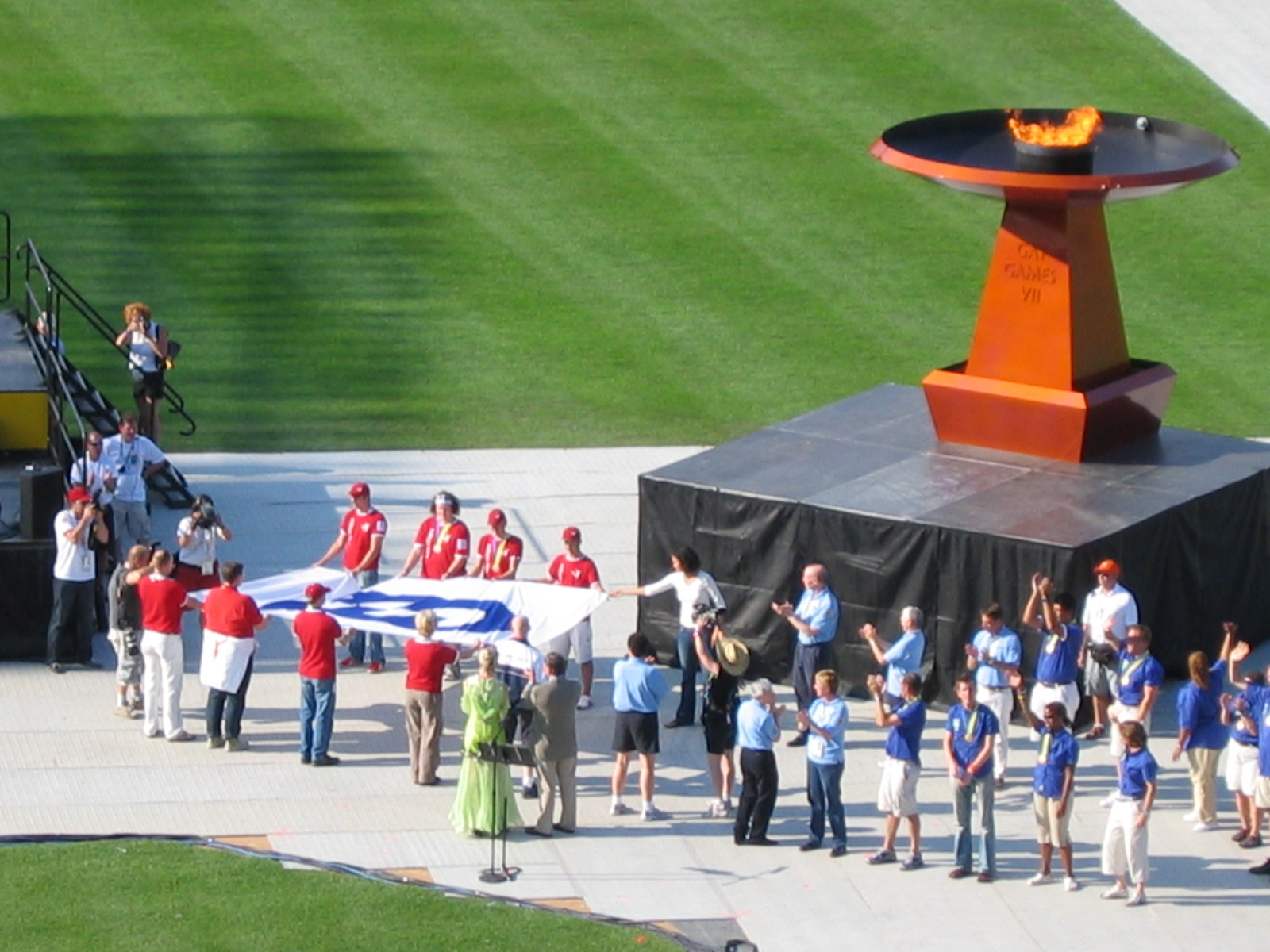
- Gay Games 2006 Closing Ceremony in Chicago, USA – Handing off the flag to the Cologne, Germany contingent, host of Gay Games 2010
- Inaugurated: 1982
- Organiser: Federation of Gay Games
- Website: www.gaygames.org

The Gay Games, formerly the Gay Olympics, is a worldwide sport and cultural event that promotes acceptance of sexual diversity, featuring lesbian, gay, bisexual, transgender, and queer (LGBTQ) athletes, artists and other individuals.

The Gay Games have some similarities with the Olympic Games, such as the Gay Games flame that is lit at the opening ceremony. Similar to the EuroGames, the games are open to all who wish to participate, without regard to sexual orientation, and there are no qualifying standards. Competitors come from many countries, including those where homosexuality remains illegal and hidden.

The 1994 Gay Games, held in June in New York City to coincide with the 25th anniversary of the Stonewall riots, the modern start of the LGBTQ movement in the United States, "overtook the Olympics in size" with 10,864 athletes compared to 9,356 at the 1992 Barcelona Olympics and 10,318 at the 1996 Atlanta Olympics.

== History ==
=== Founding ===
Founded as the Gay Olympics, the games were started in the United States in San Francisco, California, in 1982, as the brainchild of Olympic decathlete (Mexico City 1968) and medical doctor Tom Waddell, Brenda Young, and others, whose goals were to promote the spirit of inclusion, participation, and personal growth in a sporting event. Waddell wanted to recreate the Olympics' power to bring people of various different backgrounds together through the international language of sport, and the organizers of the first event strived to accommodate differences and achieve gender parity.

=== Lawsuit over 'Gay Olympics' name ===
Tom Waddell, the former Olympian who helped found the games, intended them to be called the "Gay Olympics", but a lawsuit filed less than three weeks before 1982's inaugural Gay Olympics forced the name change. This forced volunteers to suspend the sales of buttons and t-shirts in order to remove the terms "Olympic" and "Olympiad" from medals, souvenirs, t-shirts, signs, and programs, which would cost the organization an estimated loss between $15,000 and $30,000.

Event organizers were sued by the International Olympic Committee (IOC) under the U.S. Amateur Sports Act of 1978, which gave the United States Olympic Committee (USOC) exclusive rights to the word Olympic in the United States. Defendants of the lawsuit contended that the law was capriciously applied and that if the Special Olympics were not similarly prohibited, the Gay Olympics should not be either.

Others, like Daniel Bell, cite the IOC's long history of protecting the Olympics brand as evidence that the lawsuit against the "Gay Olympics" was not motivated by discrimination against gays. Since 1910 the IOC has taken action, including lawsuits and expulsion from the IOC, to stop certain organizations from using the word "Olympics." Annual "California Police Olympics" were held for 22 years, from 1967 through 1989, after which, the word Olympics was no longer used for the event. The Supreme Court ruled for the USOC in San Francisco Arts & Athletics, Inc. v. United States Olympic Committee.

A 2009 documentary film, Claiming the Title: Gay Olympics on Trial, was created in the United States and was previewed at several film festivals. The subject was also included in a 2005 film by David Sector, Take the Flame! Gay Games: Grace Grit & Glory.

In the years since the lawsuit, the Olympics and the Gay Games have set aside their initial hostilities and worked cooperatively together, successfully lobbying to have HIV travel restrictions waived for the 1994 Gay Games in New York and the 1996 Summer Olympics in Atlanta.

=== 1980s: Media impact of AIDS on the Gay Games ===
Before and during the time of the 1986 Gay Games there was mass media about Acquired Immunodeficiency Syndrome (AIDS) and how it was affecting the gay community. With the number of LGBTQ members at the Gay Games the founder Waddell took this time to try to break the stereotype of the AIDS with a show of athleticism the Gay Games had to offer. This also was a time that volunteers would provide safe sex materials along with condoms to educate the public.

=== Plans to launch Gay Winter Games in Fall 1986 ===
Plans to launch a complementary Gay Winter Games, scheduled for February 1986 in Minneapolis-St. Paul, Minnesota, collapsed, due to a lack of sufficient funding and logistical problems. There have been no subsequent attempts to launch a Gay Winter Games since, although Whistler, British Columbia, hosts an annual gay winter-sports festival, as well the European Gay Ski Week in Val Thorens, France, every year in march.

=== Schism in LGBT sports communities over Gay Games VII ===
In 2001, the bidding organization from Montreal, Quebec, won the right to negotiate with the FGG for a licensing agreement to host the 2006 Gay Games, but after two years of failed negotiations Montreal broke off talks at the 2003 FGG annual meeting in Chicago. There were three main points of contention, over which neither party could agree:

- The size of the event
- The size of the budget – especially the planned break-even participation point
- Financial transparency

In a weakening global economy following international terrorist attacks, including the September 11 attacks, the FGG wanted Montreal to be able to plan for a successful Gay Games even if participation did not meet Montreal's optimistic projection of 24,000 participants, twice the level of participation of the previous Gay Games in 2002. Due to financial problems in previous events, the FGG also asked for transparency into Montreal 2006's financial activities. After Montreal refused to continue talks, the FGG held a second round of bidding in which Chicago and Los Angeles bidders, who had put forth well-received bids to host the 2006 games in the first round along with Montreal and Atlanta, chose to bid. Ultimately, the FGG awarded Gay Games VII to Chicago Games, Inc.

The Montreal organizing committee nevertheless decided to proceed to hold an athletic and cultural event without the sanction of the FGG; this plan developed into the first edition of the World Outgames, and the creation of its licensing body, the Gay and Lesbian International Sport Association.

Due to limited personal and organizational resources, many individual and team participants were forced to choose between Gay Games Chicago and World Outgames Montreal, a situation exacerbated by the two events being a week apart. The closing ceremony of Gay Games Chicago on July 22, 2006, was only seven days before the opening ceremony of World Outgames Montreal on July 29, 2006. This meant that those who competed or performed in Chicago would have little recovery time before Montreal. The split resulted in a lower quality of athletic competition at both events because neither could claim the whole field of competitors. Team and individual sports were hurt alike.

Few teams were able to field complete squads for both events. In wrestling, 100 wrestlers competed in Chicago (comparable to previous Gay Games), but only 22 competed in Montreal, by far the lowest number for any major international tournament. There were some advantages to the games being so close together time wise and location wise. For some overseas participants who had to travel far, the convenience of the two events being only a week apart and not far from each other enabled them to attend both. Many did not attend at all. After Chicago drew 9,112 sport and cultural participants, of which 7,929 were from the US. Montreal drew 10,248 athletes, 1,516 Conference Attendees and 835 people to the cultural component of the games reflecting more than 111 countries – more 60% of the organization's original projections."

Since 2006, the need for a secondary global multisport event has been the subject of much debate, especially after the final financial figures for 2006 were released. In 2012, a round of negotiations between the FGG and GLISA ended after a mutually agreed deadline. The board of GLISA unanimously agree to the proposal set forth by the negotiation teams, however the FGG board did not reciprocate. The 7th Chicago Gay Games concluded with a net zero debt, while the Montreal World Outgames concluded with 5.3 million Canadian dollars in debt.

== Federation of Gay Games ==
The Federation of Gay Games (FGG) is the sanctioning body of the Gay Games which was founded in 1982 by Tom Waddell, after he dealt first-hand with the prejudice towards gay athletes and their inability to openly participate in sporting events. The Federation of Gay Games hosts the world's biggest cultural and sporting event for the LGBTQ community every four years. The Federation of Gay Games was founded on the principles of "participation, inclusion, and personal best" and continues to support the LGBT community not only through the Gay Games but through scholarships for underprivileged members. The Federation of Gay Games continues to expand throughout the world and accepts members of any sexual orientation and nationality to participate in the games or contribute. The FGG is planning on hosting the next Gay Games in 2026 in Valencia.

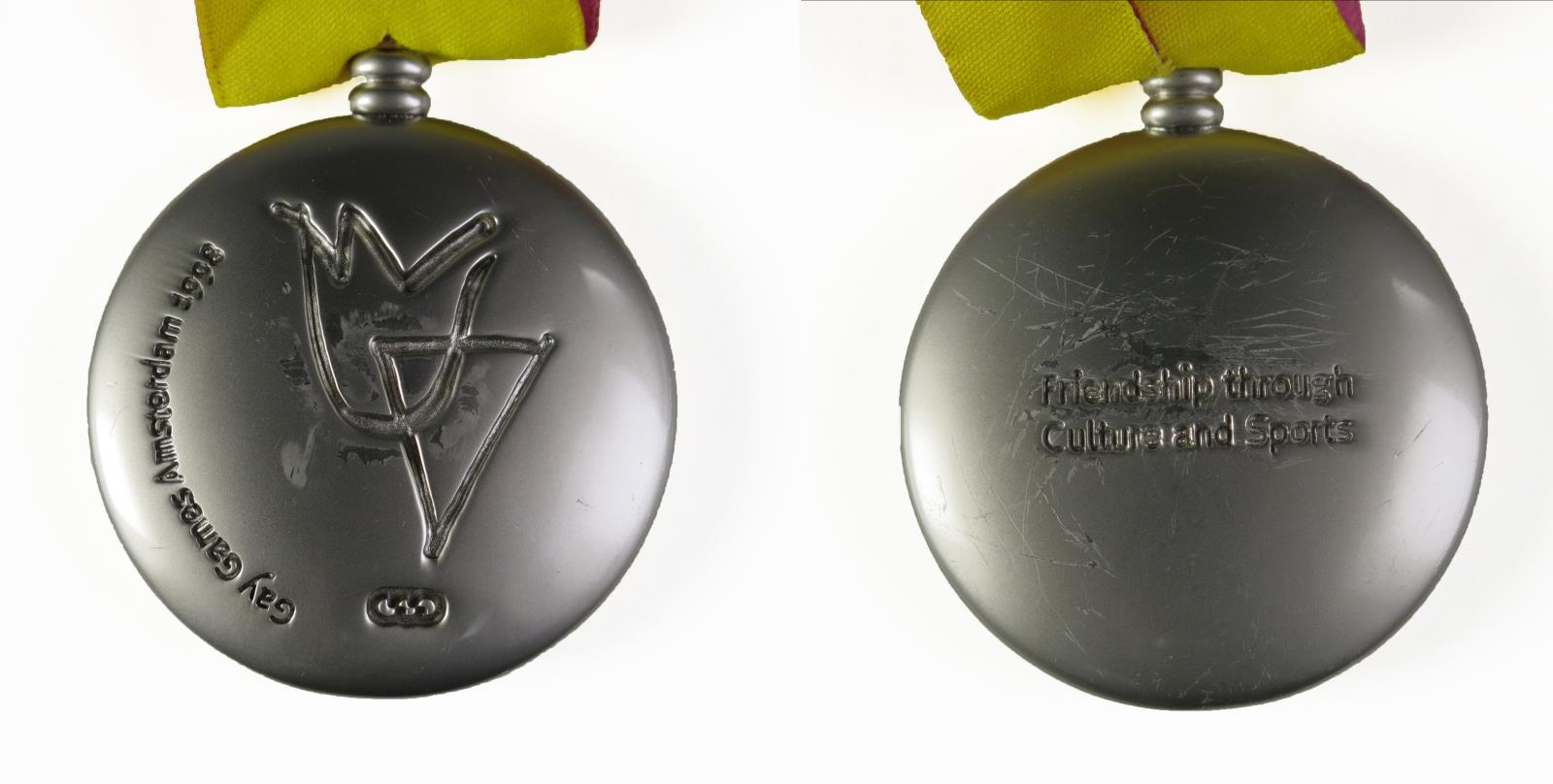
Amsterdam Gay Games participants' medal designed by Marcel Wanders (1998)

From its statement of concept and purpose:

The purpose of The Federation of Gay Games, Inc. (the “Federation”) shall be to foster and augment the self-respect of lesbian, gay, bisexual, transgender, and all sexually-fluid or gender-variant individuals (LGBT+) throughout the world and to promote respect and understanding from others, primarily by organising and administering the international quadrennial sport and cultural event known as the "Gay Games."

== Host nations and cities ==
The Gay Games are hosted by cities around the globe. So far, the event has only been hosted twice in the same city (San Francisco in 1982 and 1986 for the first two games).

Host cities of the Gay Games

Year	No.	Host city
1982	1	San Francisco, United States
1986	2	San Francisco, United States
1990	3	Vancouver, Canada
1994	4	New York City, United States
1998	5	Amsterdam, Netherlands
2002	6	Sydney, New South Wales, Australia
2006	7	Chicago, United States
2010	8	Cologne, Germany
2014	9	Cleveland-Akron, United States
2018	10	Paris, France
2023	11	Hong Kong and Guadalajara, Mexico
2026	12	Valencia, Spain
2030	13	Perth, Western Australia, Australia

== Past Gay Games ==
=== Gay Games I: San Francisco 1982 ===
The 1982 games took place in San Francisco from August 28 to September 5, 1982. Singer Tina Turner performed at the opening ceremonies, and Stephanie Mills performed at the closing ceremonies. San Francisco was chosen as the location for the first Gay Games not only because it was the home of founder Tom Waddell, but also because the games had support from local government and essential services, and because there was a large gay and lesbian population in San Francisco that could serve as volunteers and leaders. The opening ceremonies, held in Kezar Stadium, began with former U.S. Olympians, George Frenn and Susan McGreivy lighting a flame that had been carried on a torch run across America, beginning in New York at the Stonewall Inn. The original sports that were offered at the first Gay Games were; basketball, billiards, bowling, cycling, diving, golf, marathon, physique, powerlifting, soccer, softball, swimming, tennis, track and field, volleyball and wrestling. 1,350 competitors whose origins ranged from over 170 cities worldwide competed in the first Gay Games. In order to achieve greater inclusion and diversity, the organizers of the first Gay Games created outreach committees to attract and recruit athletes from minority groups including people of color, women, and rural lesbians and gays. Because Waddell disliked the nationalism of major sporting events like the Olympics, participants at the first games represented their cities rather countries, and competitive elements such as medal tallies, medal ceremonies, and recording athletic records were banned.

=== Gay Games II: San Francisco 1986 ===
The 1986 games took place in San Francisco from August 9 to 17, 1986. Singers Jennifer Holliday and Jae Ross were the featured performers during the closing ceremonies. There was an increase of competing athletes in the second Gay Games participants to over 3,500.

=== Gay Games III: Vancouver 1990 ===
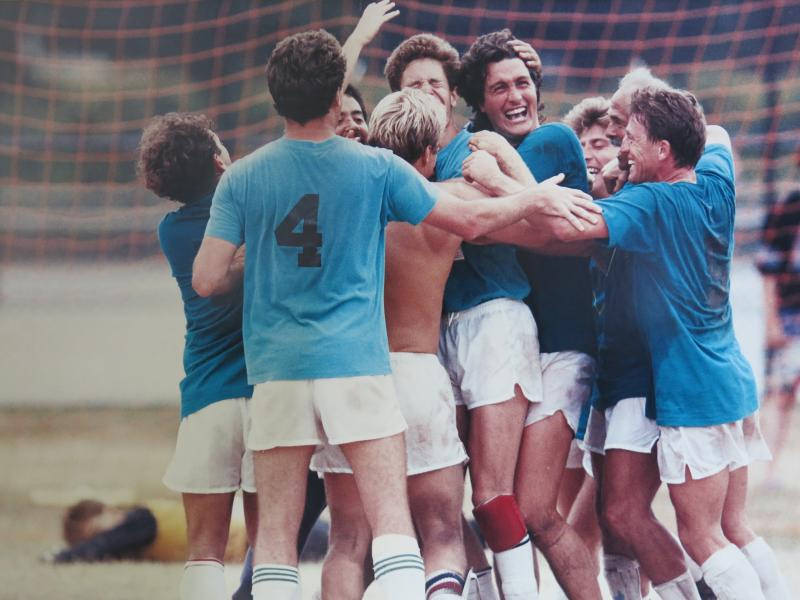
The San Francisco Spikes soccer team at the Gay Games 1990

The 1990 games took place in Vancouver, British Columbia, from August 4 to 11, 1990. Approximately 7,300 athletes took part in 27 sports, with another 1,500 cultural participants attending. This was the first games to be held outside the United States, and it is also notable for being the first games in which Masters world records were set (two, in swimming). The opening and closing ceremonies were held at BC Place Stadium, which, 20 years later, hosted the 2010 Winter Olympics opening and closing ceremony, making it a historic venue for both events.

The event was also heralded by controversy from social conservatives. A Fraser Valley church's members took out full page ads in The Vancouver Sun and The Province condemning the event as proof of an "impending sodomite invasion" and encouraging residents to gather at Empire Stadium to pray against the event. The government of then-Premier Bill Vander Zalm refused to fund the event.

Original video documentation, photographs, and textual records related to Celebration '90 Gay Games III, originally gathered by Forward Focus, artist Mary Anne McEwen's production company and official videographer of the Games. The items are available via VIVO Media Arts Centre's archive, both in-person by appointment or digitally online. The fonds includes 143 unedited 30-minute Betacam recordings of sporting competitions, cultural events, opening and closing ceremonies, backstage activities and interviews with organizers, athletes, artists, community representatives, and opponents. The fond also includes 240 photographs, Celebration ’90 ephemera, and extensive textual materials, including the Official Program. McEwen was a Vancouver-based LGBTQ activist, Gayblevision co-founder, and co-organizer of the first Out On Screen Film and Video Festival. The footage was shot in anticipation of a feature-length documentary entitled, "Legacy: The Story of the Gay Games" that McEwen was unable to complete due to insufficient funding. McEwen, a longtime VIVO member, bequeathed her personal archive to VIVO hoping that this footage would be made widely available.

=== Gay Games IV: New York 1994 ===
The 1994 games took place in New York City from June 18 to 25, 1994.

The games coincided with the 25th-anniversary events of the Stonewall riots and were themed on "Unity". Actor Sir Ian McKellen gave the closing address at Yankee Stadium on June 25, 1994.

There were over 15,000 participants that either competed in the sporting events or in cultural ceremonies in the Gay Games of 1994. Greg Louganis, multiple-time World and Olympic Champion diver, served as the announcer and performed a spectacular three-meter springboard exhibition between events. The sporting events of Gay Games IV expanded to thirty one from previous years, including but not limited to, flag football, figure skating, and the first ever internationally sanctioned women's wrestling.

=== Gay Games V: Amsterdam 1998 ===
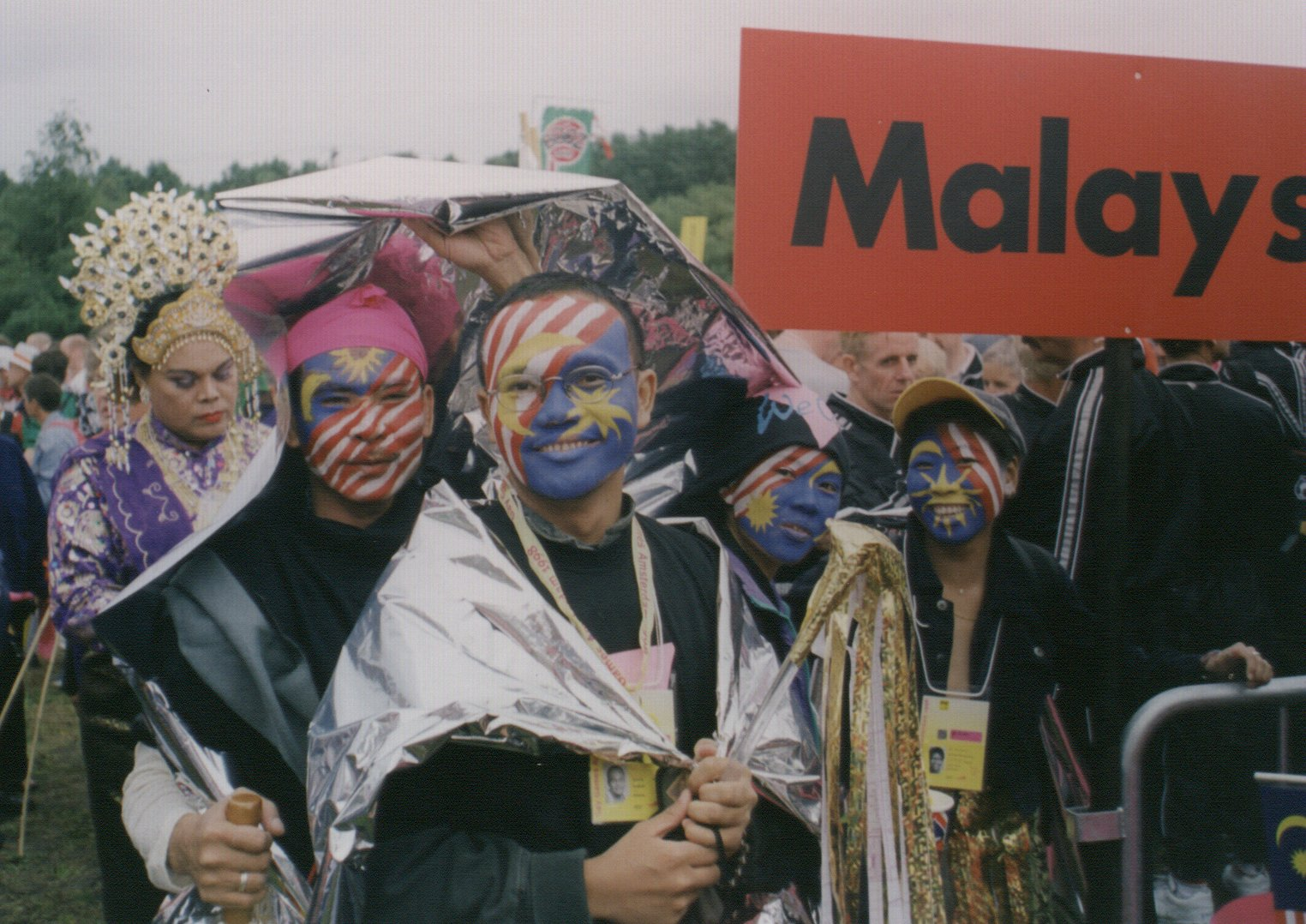
Malaysian delegation at the 1998 Games in Amsterdam

The 1998 games took place in Amsterdam, Netherlands, from August 1 to 8, 1998. The opening and closing ceremonies took place in the Amsterdam Arena. The participants' medal was designed by the noted Dutch designer Marcel Wanders.

=== Gay Games VI: Sydney 2002 ===
The 2002 game took place in Sydney, New South Wales, from November 2 to 9, 2002. Sydney won the bid to host the games from other contenders which were Montreal, Toronto, Long Beach/Los Angeles and Dallas. The Games opening included a speech by out gay High Court of Australia Justice Michael Kirby and were officially opened by New South Wales Governor Professor Marie Bashir. When Gay Games VI was chosen to be in Sydney, Australia it was partially because of already present LGBTQI sport teams. The Sydney Gay Games were the first in the Southern Hemisphere and this was emphasized by the games theme "Under new skies".

=== Gay Games VII: Chicago 2006 ===
Gay Games VII were held in Chicago, Illinois, from July 15 to July 22, 2006. For more on the controversy surrounding Chicago's selection as host city, see Schism in LGBT sports communities over Gay Games VII below.

=== Gay Games VIII: Cologne 2010 ===
On March 16, 2005, the FGG announced that Cologne, Germany; Johannesburg, South Africa; and Paris, France, were the official candidate cities for Gay Games VIII in 2010. Cologne was elected at the FGG annual meeting in Chicago on November 14, 2005.

The games were held in Cologne from July 31 to August 6, 2010. This marked the second time the games were held in Europe, with the first being in Amsterdam in 1998.

=== Gay Games IX: Cleveland and Akron 2014 ===
On March 17, 2009, the FGG announced that groups from Boston, Massachusetts; Cleveland, Ohio; and Washington, D.C., were finalists for the bidding to host Gay Games IX.

On September 29, 2009, at the FGG Site Selection Meeting in Cologne, Germany, Cleveland was chosen as presumptive host of Gay Games IX in 2014. The host organization, Cleveland Special Events Corporation, later expanded the host city to include nearby Akron, Ohio. They also chose to style their event as "Gay Games 9" rather than the traditional Roman numeral "Gay Games IX".

=== Gay Games X: Paris 2018 ===
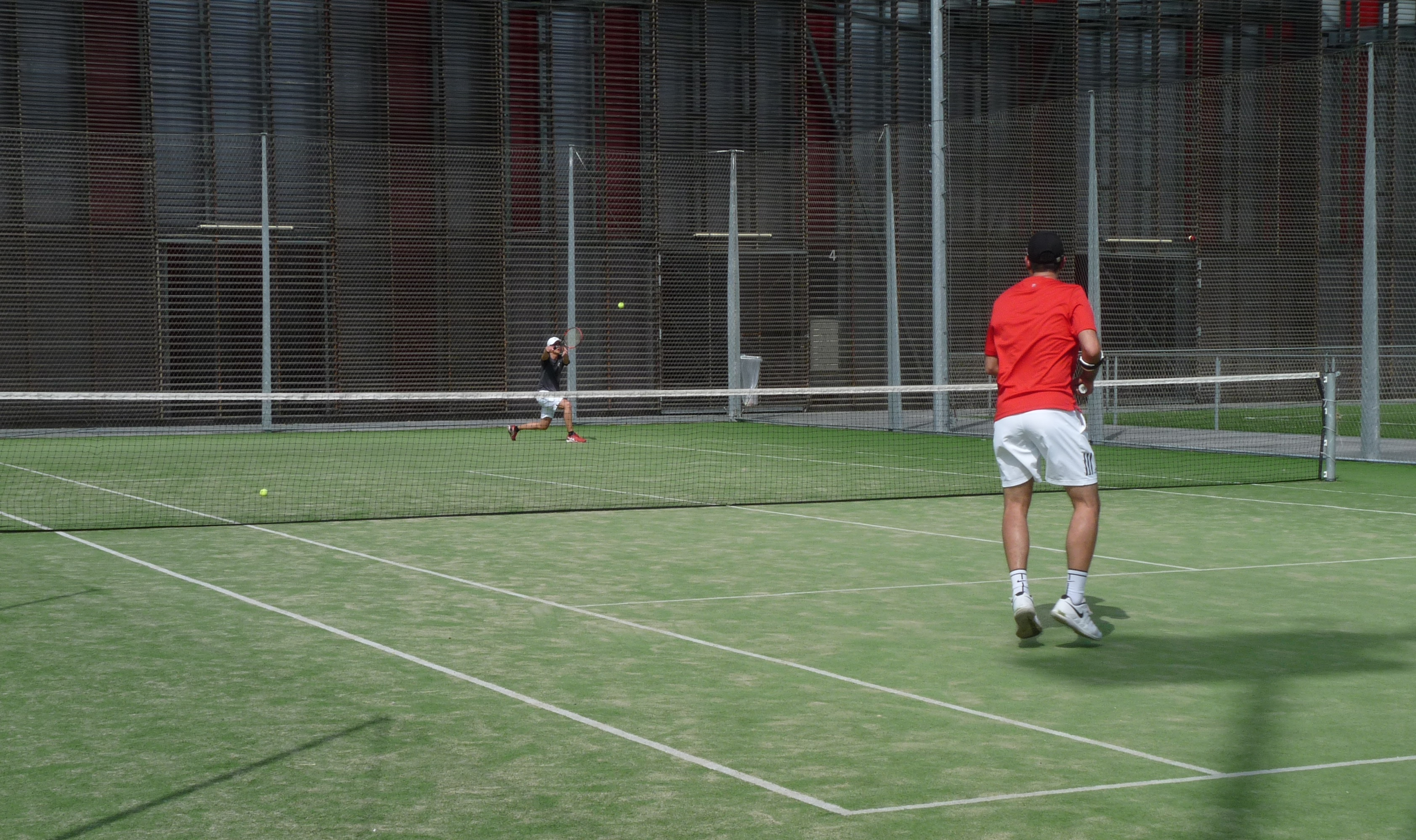
Tennis competition at the Gay Games 2018

On July 31, 2012, the FGG announced that seven cities had been approved as prospective bidders. The groups were from Amsterdam, Netherlands; Limerick, Ireland; London, United Kingdom; Orlando, Florida, United States; Paris, France; and a group proposing to host the Gay Games in either Rio de Janeiro or São Paulo, Brazil.

By August 31, 2012, letters of intent to bid had been received from all groups except those in Brazil.

In December 2012, the FGG announced that several requests from bidders to add new sports to the program of the games. Of these requests, that for the inclusion of polo was rejected, while those for archery, boxing, fencing, pétanque, roller derby and wheelchair rugby were approved. Of these, boxing, pétanque, roller derby and wheelchair rugby were included in the bids of the three finalist bidding organizations.

Bid books were provided by February 28, 2013, with a Q&A held over April and May 2013. A shortlisting vote took place on May 31, 2013, resulting in the shortlisting of Limerick, London and Paris as the final three cities to continue on the 2018 Bid cycle. Shortlisted cities received a 4-day visit (inspection sites) from a team of FGG inspectors (4 delegates + 1 CM) in July 2013. The final vote took place in Cleveland (Ohio, USA) during the 2013 Annual General Assembly. On 7 October, Paris was elected host city for the 2018 Gay Games.

Shortlisted Cities
Paris, France
(Republic of Ireland) Limerick, Ireland
London, United Kingdom
Non-Shortlisted Cities
Amsterdam, Netherlands
Orlando, United States

=== Gay Games XI: Hong Kong – Guadalajara 2023 ===
Hong Kong was announced as the host city of the 11th Gay Games, at a gala event at the Hotel de Ville in Paris, on October 30, 2017. They won with a clear majority of votes, in the first round of voting. It is the first time that the Gay Games have been held in Asia.

The "longlist" of cities interested in bidding to host Gay Games XI in 2022 was announced in April 2016. An unprecedented seventeen cities were interested in bidding. On 30 June 2016, the Federation of Gay Games announced that eleven cities had submitted their Letter Of Intent to formally bid. Anaheim, Atlanta, Des Moines, Madison, Minneapolis and San Antonio decided not to pursue their option to bid. On July 31, 2016, nine cities submitted their second registration fee to remain in the bid process. Both Cape Town and Tel Aviv dropped out at this stage, stating an intention to bid for Gay Games XII in 2026. On November 30, 2016, Bid Books were submitted by eight candidate cities with Los Angeles dropping out at this stage.

A shortlist of three Candidate Cities was announced on March 1, 2017. Guadalajara, Hong Kong and Washington, DC, hosted site visits before the final decision on the host city was made in Paris on Monday 30 October, where Hong Kong was announced as the host city.

Due to issues relating to the global coronavirus pandemic, the date of the Games was pushed back from 2022 to 2023. On 14 February 2022, Guadalajara was added as the co-host of this games.

Shortlisted Candidate Cities
Hong Kong (original host)
(Mexico) Guadalajara (co-host)
(United States) Washington DC
Longlisted Candidate Cities
(United States) Austin, TX
(United States) Dallas, TX
(United States) Denver, CO
(United States) Salt Lake City, UT
(United States) San Francisco, CA

Dropout Candidate Cities
(United States) Anaheim, CA
(United States) Atlanta, GA
(South Africa) Cape Town
(United States) Des Moines, IA
(United States) Los Angeles, CA
(United States) Madison, WI
(United States) Minneapolis, MN
(Israel) Tel Aviv

Both events were attended by over five thousand participants across the two sites, who took part in a week of sports and culture.

The overwhelming tone of the comments from the Hong Kong participants was positive and appreciative. Participants and attendees congratulated the organizers on a job well done, expressing enjoyment and meaningful experiences at the Gay Games in Hong Kong. Many thanked the committee for their hard work, appreciating the inclusive atmosphere, and expressing gratitude for making history and supporting the LGBTQ+ community. There's acknowledgment of the difficulties faced, but the general sentiment is one of praise and thankfulness for a successful event in Hong Kong.

Participants in Mexico overwhelmingly expressed gratitude and praise for the Gay Games in Guadalajara. They describe it as a life-changing and pure experience that blends sport, culture, coexistence, and community. Many commended the organizers, highlighting the fantastic overall organization and the meaningful connection to local culture. Despite some acknowledging challenges, the general sentiment is one of appreciation, excitement, and a strong desire to participate again, particularly in Valencia 2026. The positive experiences range from the warmth of kindness, excellent event management, and the welcoming nature of Guadalajara to the joy of being part of a global LGBTQ+ community.

=== Gay Games XII: Valencia 2026 ===
Gay Games XII was held from June 27 through July 4, 2026, in Valencia, Spain. There were 41 sports events. The games were met with protests and graffiti. The opening ceremony suffered from sound problems. Heat made some competitions difficult.

==== Selection ====
The Federation of Gay Games published the call for interested cities on 19 December 2019, and the official RFI was issued on January 31, 2020. Prospective bidding cities had to submit the response to the RFI by February 21, 2020. At the early stage, evidence on social media existed for a bid by Brisbane, Australia and Brighton & Hove, United Kingdom. Anecdotal evidence from the 2022 bid process also suggested that Tel Aviv, Israel, would bid again, seeking to bring the Gay Games to the Middle East for the first time, although this did not materialise. The press release issued on February 29 by the FGG stated: "The Federation of Gay Games has received a record number of expressions of interest from cities around the globe desiring to be the host of the twelfth Gay Games XII to be held in 2026!" A shortlist of three Candidate Cities was announced on March 1, 2021. On November 11, 2021 in Brighton, Valencia, Spain was selected as the host for 2026.

Below is the official list of the candidate cities:

Shortlisted Candidate Cities	Country
(Spain) Valencia	Spain
(Germany) Munich	Germany
(Mexico) Guadalajara	Mexico
Longlisted Candidate Cities	Country
(Australia) Brisbane	Australia
(Canada) Toronto	Canada
(Chinese Taipei) Taipei	Taiwan
(New Zealand) Auckland	New Zealand
(United States) San Diego	US
Dropout Candidate Cities	Country
(Brazil) São Paulo	Brazil
(Republic of Ireland) Dublin	Ireland
(Netherlands) Amsterdam	Netherlands
(Portugal) Lisbon	Portugal
(South Africa) Cape Town	South Africa
(South Africa) Durban	South Africa
(United Kingdom) Liverpool	UK
(United States) Austin	US
(United States) Fort Lauderdale	US
(United States) Minneapolis	US
(United States) New Orleans	US
(United States) Seattle	US

== Future Gay Games ==
=== Gay Games XIII: Perth 2030 ===
The bidding process for Gay Games XIII 2030 opened in January 2024, with 21 cities on 6 continents showing interest. On October 27th, the leader of the 2030 site selection process announced in Valencia, Spain, that Perth, Western Australia, is the winner for the Gay Games XIII in 2030.

The Gay Games XIII in Perth, Western Australia will be the second to be hosted in the Southern Hemisphere, as well as the second ever held in Australia after Sydney, New South Wales, hosted the Games in 2002.

Below is the list of candidate cities which submitted bids for the Gay Games XIII:

Shortlisted Candidate Cities	Country
(Australia) Perth	Australia
(United States) Denver	US
Longlisted Candidate Cities	Country
(Australia) Adelaide	Australia
(New Zealand) Auckland	New Zealand
(South Africa) Cape Town	South Africa
(Canada) Edmonton	Canada
(Germany) Frankfurt	Germany
(Australia) Melbourne	Australia
(Chinese Taipei) Taipei	Taiwan
(Canada) Vancouver	Canada
Dropout Candidate Cities	Country
(Greece) Athens	Greece
(United States) Atlanta	US
(United Kingdom) Birmingham	UK
(United States) Boston	US
(South Africa) Johannesburg	South Africa
(United Kingdom) Liverpool	UK
(United States) Miami	US
(United States) Oak Creek	US
(United States) San Diego	US
(Brazil) São Paulo	Brazil
(United States) Seattle	US

== See also ==
- EuroGames (LGBT sporting event)
- International Gay and Lesbian Football Association
- International Gay Figure Skating Union
- List of LGBT sportspeople
- Principle 6 campaign
