= 1986 Gay Games =

LGBT multi-sport event in San Francisco, California, US

II Gay Games San Francisco 1986
- Host city: San Francisco, California, United States
- Athletes: 2,000
- Events: 17 sports
- Opening: August 9, 1986
- Closing: August 17, 1986

The 1986 Gay Games (Gay Games II) were held in San Francisco, California, United States from August 9 to August 17, 1986.

The opening ceremony had Rita Mae Brown as master of ceremonies, and also featured Gwen Avery, the Barbary Coast Cloggers, Leona Jiles, Nepata Mero, Ron Murphy and his Choir, Sharon McNight, Calvin Remsberg (from the cast of Cats), the Golden Gate Precision Dancers, and the Lesbian/Gay Band of America. The closing ceremony was emceed by Armistead Maupin and featured Cabaret Gold Award winner Jae Ross with Jennifer Holliday as the main star.

== Events ==
Events	August									Venue
Events	9th	10th	11th	12th	13th	14th	15th	16th	17th	Venue
Opening and closing ceremonies										Kezar Stadium
Basketball										San Francisco State University; Kezar Pavilion
Bowling										Park Bowl
Cycling										Lake Merced
Golf										Harding Park
Marathon										Streets of San Francisco
Physique										Civic Auditorium
Pool (Billiards)										Park Bowl
Powerlifting										San Francisco State University
Racquetball										UC Berkeley
Soccer										W. Sunset Park
Softball										Moscone Field
Swimming and Diving										Laney College, Oakland
Tennis										San Francisco City College; Golden Gate Park
Track & Field										San Francisco State University
Triathlon										Tilden Park, Berkeley
Volleyball										San Francisco City College; Kezar Pavilion
Wrestling										Kezar Pavilion
