= 2018 IGLFA World Championship =

Tournament details
- City: Paris (France)
- Dates: 5–11 August 2018
- Teams: 54 (from 19 associations)

Final positions
- Champions: West Hollywood SC (Men's 11s D1); Stonewall FC (Men's 11s D2); SUD AU CUL (Men's 7s); Rosa Bonheur (Women's 7s)

The 2018 IGLFA World Championship was the 23rd officially recognized world championship event for the IGLFA. It was held in Paris, France from August 5 through 11 as the football (soccer) competition part of the 2018 Gay Games. Panamboyz United and FC Paris Arc en ciel served as the official co-hosts of the tournament, with support from the IGLFA and French Football Federation. All matches took place at Tremblay Park.

Federal Triangles Soccer Club (FTSC) were the defending world champions, while Stonewall F.C. were four-time defending Gay Games champions.

Nearly 900 participants in roughly 60 teams - some for 11v11 competition, some for 7v7 - were registered for the championship. They represented 54 different clubs from 19 total nations. This made the IGLFA competition at the 2018 Gay Games the largest IGFLA world championship event since the 19th IGLFA championship (played as part of the 2010 Gay Games) in Cologne.

In the men's 11s D1 final, West Hollywood Soccer Club (LA Eclipse) beat Village Manchester FC on penalties after a 1 - 1 draw, winning the IGLFA again 21 years after their last win (as LA Suns) in 1997.

== Tournament structure ==
Two weeks before the tournament, the official Paris 2018 website and the Facebook event for the tournament differed slightly in the number of teams per competition and in available competitions. The official site claimed 14 DI men's 11s teams, 21 DII men's 11s teams, 8 DI men's 7s teams, 6 DII Men's 7s teams, and 11 Women's 7s teams; the official Facebook event claims 32 Men's 11s teams (down from 35) that would be split evenly into DI and DII after the preliminary phase, 14 men's 7s teams (no divisional split), and 12 women's 7s teams (up from 11). (All men's teams are open to have female participants.)

Co-hosts Panamboyz United clarified the discrepancy in a Facebook post, confirming the absolute merger of the men's 7s competition and the preliminary-phase merger of the men's 11s competition, the latter similar to what occurred in the IGLFA Unity Cup the previous year. That is, the men's 11s competition will begin with all 32 teams pooled into group regardless of registered division, followed by two separate knockout brackets, with the 16 higher-ranked teams from the groups in the "DI" bracket and the 16 lower-ranked teams from the groups in the "DII" bracket. As each team in the 11s competition was guaranteed to play 7 games (all 60 minutes except for the medal-qualifying semifinals and finals which will be a full 90 minutes each), this suggested that the losers in any round of the knockout phase will play fellow losers in subsequent rounds for a total of four placements games per team after their three group games. The groups in the 11s competition would be structured such that each team was only expected to play one opponent who initially registered for the other division - with the exception of one group, the exception likely a function of the fact that initial registration on the official website suggested 50% more DII teams than DI teams.

However, official tournament documents released the Sunday before games started revealed further alterations to the tournament format. The Men's 7s competition was reduced back to 14 teams (after 15 had been previously posted to Facebook), and was split back into an 8-team DI bracket and 6-team DII group phase for placement games. The Women's 7s competition was reduced to 10 teams, and would include two 4-team playoff brackets and one return game for the 9th and 10th teams. Finally, the Men's 11s competition would include four 8-team playoff brackets instead of two 16-team playoff brackets, reducing the total number of games per team from seven to six. The four brackets were called D1, D2 elite, D2-B (effectively D3), and D2-C (effectively D4), where each playoff bracket would include the 8 teams who finished in the corresponding ranks in the eight 4-team groups. The official website was also ultimately updated to show these changes in team counts.

Further slight changes to both 7s competitions were required after one team in each forfeited out of their last group stage match, in addition to one women's team forfeiting the entire competition the morning the group stage began.

== Participating clubs ==
Co-hosts FC Paris Arc en ciel posted the official list of participating teams to Facebook the day after the tournament structure was announced, (with an additional men's 7s team,) though did not specify whether the men's/open teams had initially registered as DI or DII. The official list was later updated before games began, revealing the addition of Ballboys Hamburg in a joint team with Panamboyz United, two team mergers in the Women's competition as well as the addition of the SF Spikes to the Philadelphia Falcon's squad, and one merger in the Men's 7s competition. Trophies were awarded to the top three teams in D1, D2 Elite (DII), and both 7s competitions, and to the top teams in D2-B (DIII) and D2-C (DIV).

Team		Men's 11s				Men's 7s		Women's 7s	
Team		DI	DII	DIII	DIV	DI*		DI*	
ADA The Hauge	(Netherlands)								×
ARDHIS FC	(France)	•							
Austin Goldstars; Twin City Jacks	(United States) (Texas) (United States) (Minnesota)				•				
Ballboys Hamburg; Panamboyz United	(Germany) (France)			•					
BeesCats Soccer Boys	(Brazil)					•			
BNP Paribas; Haraga United	(France) (Algeria)						×		
Boston Strikers	(United States) (Massachusetts)			•			•		
Caramellas Nice; Cluj; Graz	(France) (Romania) (Austria)								•
Cork Rebels FC	(Republic of Ireland)					•			
Didesex AC	(Mexico)			•				•	
Hackney WFC	(England)							•	
Dublin Devils FC	(Republic of Ireland)	•					•		
Leftfooters FC	(England)						•		
East End Phoenix FC	(England)				•				
Estrela Nova	(Brazil)								×
FC Paris Arc en ciel	(France)								•
Federal Triangles Soccer Club	(United States) (Washington, D.C.)		•		•	•			
Philadelphia Falcons	(United States) (Pennsylvania)					•		•	
San Francisco Spikes	(United States) (California)				•			•	
Flying Bats WFC	(Australia)							•	
GFC Friends Prague	(Czech Republic)					•			
GMadrid; Samurai	(Spain) (Japan)			•					
HotScots FC	(Scotland)			•					
Kaethes Tanten	(Germany)								•
Les Fuegos	(France)								•
Lobos Mexico	(Mexico)		•						
London Falcons FC	(England)			•					
London Titans FC	(England)				•				
Los Dogos DAG	(Argentina)	•							
Minnesota Gray Ducks	(United States) (Minnesota)		•						
New York Ramblers	(United States) (New York (state))	•				•	•		
Racing Pop	(France)						#		
Rain City Soccer Club	(United States) (Washington (state))			•					
Rosa Bonheur	(France)							•	
San Diego Sparks	(United States) (California)			•					
Soho FC	(England)					•			
Stockholm Snipers IF	(Sweden)	•							
Stonewall F.C.	(England)	•	•		•				
SUD AU CUL	(France)					•			
Sydney Rangers FC	(Australia)		#						
Team München e.V. Streetboys	(Germany)		•						
Trowbridge Tigers FC	(England)					•			
Toronto United	(Canada)		•						
Vancouver United	(Canada)				•				
Village Manchester F.C.	(England)	•			•				
West Hollywood SC	(United States) (California)	•							
Yorkshire Terriers FC	(England)		•						
Zorros Mexico	(Mexico)						•		
54	19	32				14		10	

* columns for the 7s competitions are divided by which teams qualified for the medals brackets
× team forfeited before/during group stage
# team forfeited before/during finals stage

=== By nation ===
Clubs in italics have won multiple IGLFA medals at previous events. Individual team name as they appear in the team announcement Google Drive are in parentheses.

- Algeria (1): Haraga United
- Argentina (1): Los Dogos DAG
- Australia (2): The Flying Bats Women's Football Club, Sydney Rangers FC
- Austria (1): (Cluj & Graz & Nice United)
- Brazil (2): BeesCats Soccer Boys, Estrela Nova
- Canada (2): Toronto United, Vancouver United
- Czech Republic (1): GFC Friends Prague
- England (10): East End Phoenix FC, Hackney Women's FC, Leftfooters FC (LeftDevils FC), London Falcons FC, London Titans FC, Soho FC, Stonewall FC (Cubs; Lions; Pride), Trowbridge Tigers FC, Village Manchester FC (first; reserves), Yorkshire Terriers FC
- France (9): ARDHIS FC, BNP Paribas, Caramellas Nice (Cluj & Graz & Nice United), FC Paris Arc en ciel, Les Fuegos, Panamboyz United, Racing Pop, Rosa Bonheur, SUD AU CUL
- Germany (3): Ballboys Hamburg, Kaethes Tanten, Streetboys München (Team München e.V.)
- Ireland (2): Cork Rebels FC, Dublin Devils FC (LeftDevils FC)
- Japan (1): (GMadrid-Samurai)
- Mexico (3): Didesex AC, Lobos Mexico, Zorros Mexico
- Netherlands (1): ADA The Hauge
- Romania (1): (Cluj & Graz & Nice United)
- Scotland (1): HotScots FC
- Spain (1): (GMadrid-Samurai)
- Sweden (1): Stockholm Snipers IF
- United States (11): Austin Goldstars (Jacks & Goldstars), Boston Strikers, Federal Triangles Soccer Club (Rainbow Unicorns; Balls Deep State; FTSC/Falcons), Minnesota Gray Ducks, New York Ramblers (Ramblers; 7s; Steal Your Manblers), Philadelphia Falcons, Rain City Soccer Club (Jet City Strikers), San Francisco Spikes, San Diego Sparks, Twin City Jacks (Jacks & Goldstars), West Hollywood SC

== Results ==
=== Preliminary stage ===
==== Men's 11s ====
Group 1
Pos	Team	Pld	W	D	L	GF	GA	GD	Pts
1	Dublin Devils FC	3	3	0	0	7	1	+6	9
2	Minnesota Gray Ducks	3	2	0	1	10	2	+8	6
3	London Falcons FC	3	1	0	2	2	3	−1	3
4	Balls Deep State	3	0	0	3	0	13	−13	0

August 6, 2018
09:00 CEST

Balls Deep State (United States)	0–4	(Republic of Ireland) Dublin Devils FC

Field 1, Tremblay Park
10:30 CEST

Minnesota Gray Ducks (United States)	2–0	(England) London Falcons FC

15:00 CEST

Minnesota Gray Ducks (United States)	7–0	(United States) Balls Deep State

16:30 CEST

London Falcons FC (England)	0–1	(Republic of Ireland) Dublin Devils FC

August 7, 2018
10:30 CEST

Minnesota Gray Ducks (United States)	1–2	(Republic of Ireland) Dublin Devils FC

15:00 CEST

London Falcons FC (England)	2–0	(United States) Balls Deep State

Group 2
Pos	Team	Pld	W	D	L	GF	GA	GD	Pts
1	West Hollywood SC	3	3	0	0	6	0	+6	9
2	Stonewall Cubs	3	1	1	1	3	2	+1	4
3	Panamboyz United	3	0	2	1	1	4	−3	2
4	San Francisco Spikes	3	0	1	2	0	4	−4	1

August 6, 2018
12:00 CEST

West Hollywood SC (United States)	3–0	(France) (Germany) Panamboyz United-Ballboys Hamburg

Field 1, Tremblay Park
13:30 CEST

San Francisco Spikes (United States)	0–2	(England) Stonewall Cubs

18:00 CEST

West Hollywood SC (United States)	2–0	(United States) San Francisco Spikes

August 7, 2018
09:00 CEST

Panamboyz United-Ballboys Hamburg (France) (Germany)	1–1	(England) Stonewall Cubs

16:30 CEST

Panamboyz United-Ballboys Hamburg (France) (Germany)	0–0	(United States) San Francisco Spikes

August 9, 2018
11:00 CEST

West Hollywood SC (United States)	1–0	(England) Stonewall Cubs

Group 3
Pos	Team	Pld	W	D	L	GF	GA	GD	Pts
1	Los Dogos Argentina	3	3	0	0	4	0	+4	9
2	Rainbow Unicorns	3	2	0	1	12	1	+11	6
3	San Diego Sparks	3	1	0	2	5	5	0	3
4	Stonewall Pride	3	0	0	3	1	16	−15	0

August 6, 2018
09:00 CEST

Rainbow Unicorns (United States)	9–0	(England) Stonewall Pride

Field 2, Tremblay Park
10:30 CEST

San Diego Sparks (United States)	0–1	(Argentina) Los Dogos

15:00 CEST

Rainbow Unicorns (United States)	3–0	(United States) San Diego Sparks

16:30 CEST

Stonewall Pride (England)	0–2	(Argentina) Los Dogos

August 7, 2018
10:30 CEST

Rainbow Unicorns (United States)	0–1	(Argentina) Los Dogos

15:00 CEST

Stonewall Pride (England)	1–5	(United States) San Diego Sparks

Group 4
Pos	Team	Pld	W	D	L	GF	GA	GD	Pts
1	ARDHIS FC	3	3	0	0	12	1	+11	9
2	Sydney Rangers FC	3	1	1	1	4	5	−1	4
3	HotScots FC	3	1	1	1	4	7	−3	4
4	Vancouver United	3	0	0	3	0	7	−7	0

August 6, 2018
12:00 CEST

ARDHIS FC (France)	5–0	(Scotland) HotScots FC

Field 2, Tremblay Park
13:30 CEST

Vancouver United (Canada)	0–1	(Australia) Sydney Rangers FC

18:00 CEST

ARDHIS FC (France)	4–0	(Canada) Vancouver United

August 7, 2018
09:00 CEST

HotScots FC (Scotland)	2–2	(Australia) Sydney Rangers FC

16:30 CEST

ARDHIS FC (France)	3–1	(Australia) Sydney Rangers FC

18:00 CEST

HotScots FC (Scotland)	2–0	(Canada) Vancouver United

Group 5
Pos	Team	Pld	W	D	L	GF	GA	GD	Pts
1	Village Manchester FC	3	3	0	0	6	0	+6	9
2	Lobos Mexico	3	1	1	1	4	3	+1	4
3	Jet City Strikers	3	1	0	2	3	7	−4	3
4	London Titans	3	0	1	2	1	4	−3	1

August 6, 2018
09:00 CEST

VMFC First (England)	1–0	(England) London Titans FC

Field 3, Tremblay Park
10:30 CEST

Jet City Strikers (United States)	1–3	Lobos Mexico

15:00 CEST

VMFC First (England)	4–0	(United States) Jet City Strikers

16:30 CEST

London Titans FC (England)	1–1	Lobos Mexico

August 7, 2018
10:30 CEST

VMFC First (England)	1–0	Lobos Mexico

15:00 CEST

London Titans FC (England)	0–2	(United States) Jet City Strikers

Group 6
Pos	Team	Pld	W	D	L	GF	GA	GD	Pts
1	Stonewall Lions	3	3	0	0	13	1	+12	9
2	Toronto United	3	1	1	1	4	6	−2	4
3	Didesex AC	3	1	1	1	4	6	−2	4
4	VMFC Reserves	3	0	0	3	1	9	−8	0

August 6, 2018
12:00 CEST

Stonewall Lions (England)	4–0	(England) VMFC Reserves

Field 3, Tremblay Park
13:30 CEST

Toronto United (Canada)	1–1	(Mexico) Didesex AC

18:00 CEST

Stonewall Lions (England)	5–1	(Canada) Toronto United

August 7, 2018
09:00 CEST

VMFC Reserves (England)	1–3	(Mexico) Didesex AC

16:30 CEST

VMFC Reserves (England)	0–2	(Canada) Toronto United

August 9, 2018
11:00 CEST

Stonewall Lions (England)	4–0	(Mexico) Didesex AC

Group 7
Pos	Team	Pld	W	D	L	GF	GA	GD	Pts
1	Stockholm Snipers	3	2	1	0	12	0	+12	7
2	Yorkshire Terriers FC	3	2	1	0	7	1	+6	7
3	Boston Strikers	3	1	0	2	4	9	−5	3
4	East End Phoenix FC	3	0	0	3	0	13	−13	0

August 6, 2018
09:00 CEST

Stockholm Snipers (Sweden)	0–0	(England) Yorkshire Terriers FC

Field 4, Tremblay Park
10:30 CEST

Boston Strikers (United States)	3–0	(England) East End Phoenix FC

15:00 CEST

Stockholm Snipers (Sweden)	7–0	(United States) Boston Strikers

16:30 CEST

Yorkshire Terriers FC (England)	5–0	(England) East End Phoenix FC

August 7, 2018
10:30 CEST

Stockholm Snipers (Sweden)	5–0	(England) East End Phoenix FC

15:00 CEST

Yorkshire Terriers FC (England)	2–1	(United States) Boston Strikers

Group 8
Pos	Team	Pld	W	D	L	GF	GA	GD	Pts
1	New York Ramblers	3	3	0	0	5	0	+5	9
2	Team München	3	2	0	1	4	1	+3	6
3	GMadrid-Samurai	3	1	0	2	2	6	−4	3
4	Jacks and Goldstars	3	0	0	3	1	5	−4	0

August 6, 2018
12:00 CEST

New York Ramblers (United States)	1–0	(Germany) München Streetboys

Field 4, Tremblay Park
13:30 CEST

Jacks and Goldstars (United States)	1–2	(Spain) (Japan) GMadrid-Samurai

18:00 CEST

New York Ramblers (United States)	2–0	(United States) Jacks and Goldstars

August 7, 2018
09:00 CEST

München Streetboys (Germany)	3–0	(Spain) (Japan) GMadrid-Samurai

16:30 CEST

New York Ramblers (United States)	2–0	(Spain) (Japan) GMadrid-Samurai

18:00 CEST

München Streetboys (Germany)	1–0	(United States) Jacks and Goldstars

==== Women's 7s ====
Group 1
Pos	Team	Pld	W	D	L	GF	GA	GD	Pts
1	Philly Falcons/SF Spikes	4	3	1	0	12	4	+8	10
2	Flying Bats WFC	4	2	1	1	7	4	+3	7
3	FC Paris Arc-En-Ciel	4	2	1	1	9	5	+4	7
4	Cluj & Graz & Nice United	4	1	0	3	6	12	−6	3
5	Kaethes Tanten	4	0	1	3	1	10	−9	1

August 6, 2018
10:30 CEST

Philly Falcons/SF Spikes (United States)	0–0	(France) FC Paris Arc-En-Ciel

Field 5, Tremblay Park
12:00 CEST

Cluj & Graz & Nice United (Romania) (Austria) (France)	1–3	(Australia) Flying Bats WFC

13:30 CEST

Kaethes Tanten (Germany)	1–5	(United States) Philly Falcons/SF Spikes

15:00 CEST

FC Paris Arc-En-Ciel (France)	5–3	(Romania) (Austria) (France) Cluj & Graz & Nice United

16:30 CEST

Flying Bats WFC (Australia)	0–0	(Germany) Kaethes Tanten

August 7, 2018
09:00 CEST

Philly Falcons/SF Spikes (United States)	4–1	(Romania) (Austria) (France) Cluj & Graz & Nice United

10:30 CEST

FC Paris Arc-En-Ciel (France)	0–2	(Australia) Flying Bats WFC

15:00 CEST

Kaethes Tanten (Germany)	0–1	(Romania) (Austria) (France) Cluj & Graz & Nice United

16:30 CEST

Philly Falcons/SF Spikes (United States)	3–2	(Australia) Flying Bats WFC

18:00 CEST

FC Paris Arc-En-Ciel (France)	4–0	(Germany) Kaethes Tanten

Group 2
Pos	Team	Pld	W	D	L	GF	GA	GD	Pts
1	Rosa Bonhuer	4	4	0	0	13	1	+12	12
2	Didesex Mexico/Hackney United	4	3	0	1	22	5	+17	9
3	Les Fuegos	4	2	0	2	9	6	+3	6
4	ADA The Hauge	4	1	0	3	4	24	−20	3
5	Estrela Nova	4	0	0	4	0	12	−12	0

August 6, 2018
10:30 CEST

Didesex/Hackney (Mexico) (England)	3–0	(Brazil) Estrela Nova
	forfeit

Field 6, Tremblay Park
12:00 CEST

ADA The Hauge (Netherlands)	1–6	(France) Les Fuegos

13:30 CEST

Rosa Bonhuer (France)	5–1	(Mexico) (England) Didesex/Hackney

15:00 CEST

Estrela Nova (Brazil)	0–3	(Netherlands) ADA The Hauge
	forfeit

16:30 CEST

Les Fuegos (France)	0–2	(France) Rosa Bonhuer

August 7, 2018
09:00 CEST

Didesex/Hackney (Mexico) (England)	15–0	(Netherlands) ADA The Hauge

10:30 CEST

Estrela Nova (Brazil)	0–3	(France) Les Fuegos
	forfeit

15:00 CEST

Rosa Bonhuer (France)	3–0	(Netherlands) ADA The Hauge
	forfeit

16:30 CEST

Didesex/Hackney (Mexico) (England)	3–0	(France) Les Fuegos

18:00 CEST

Estrela Nova (Brazil)	0–3	(France) Rosa Bonhuer
	forfeit

==== Men's 7s ====
Group 1
Pos	Team	Pld	W	D	L	GF	GA	GD	Pts
1	SUD AU CUL	3	3	0	0	26	1	+25	9
2	FTSC/Falcons	3	2	0	1	9	8	+1	6
3	New York Ramblers	3	1	0	2	4	13	−9	3
4	LeftDevils FC	3	0	0	3	2	19	−17	0

August 6, 2018
10:30 CEST

FTSC/Falcons (United States)	6–0	(England) (Republic of Ireland) LeftDevils FC

Field 7, Tremblay Park
12:00 CEST

SUD AU CUL (France)	9–0	(United States) New York Ramblers

15:00 CEST

FTSC/Falcons (United States)	0–7	(France) SUD AU CUL

16:30 CEST

LeftDevils FC (England) (Republic of Ireland)	1–3	(United States) New York Ramblers

August 7, 2018
09:00 CEST

FTSC/Falcons (United States)	3–1	(United States) New York Ramblers

10:30 CEST

LeftDevils FC (England) (Republic of Ireland)	1–10	(France) SUD AU CUL

Group 2
Pos	Team	Pld	W	D	L	GF	GA	GD	Pts
1	Steal Your Manblers	3	3	0	0	12	2	+10	9
2	Trowbridge Tigers FC	3	2	0	1	5	5	0	6
3	Racing Pop	3	1	0	2	17	8	+9	3
4	Boston Strikers	3	0	0	3	3	22	−19	0

August 6, 2018
10:30 CEST

Steal Your Manblers (United States)	3–0	(England) Trowbridge Tigers FC

Field 8, Tremblay Park
12:00 CEST

Racing Pop (France)	14–2	(United States) Boston Strikers

15:00 CEST

Steal Your Manblers (United States)	2–1	(France) Racing Pop

16:30 CEST

Trowbridge Tigers FC (England)	1–0	(United States) Boston Strikers

August 7, 2018
09:00 CEST

Steal Your Manblers (United States)	7–1	(United States) Boston Strikers

10:30 CEST

Trowbridge Tigers FC (England)	4–2	(France) Racing Pop

Group 3
Pos	Team	Pld	W	D	L	GF	GA	GD	Pts
1	BeesCats	3	3	0	0	27	6	+21	9
2	Cork Rebels FC	3	2	0	1	6	9	−3	6
3	Haraga United	3	0	0	3	4	18	−14	0

August 6, 2018
10:30 CEST

BeesCats (Brazil)	7–1	(Republic of Ireland) Cork Rebels FC

Field 9, Tremblay Park
13:30 CEST

BeesCats (Brazil)	11–2	(Algeria) (France) Haraga/BNP Paribas

16:30 CEST

Cork Rebels FC (Republic of Ireland)	4–2	(Algeria) (France) Haraga/BNP Paribas

Group 4
Pos	Team	Pld	W	D	L	GF	GA	GD	Pts
1	GFC Friends Prague	3	3	0	0	9	1	+8	9
2	Soho FC	3	0	1	2	4	6	−2	1
3	Zorros Mexico	3	0	1	2	6	16	−10	1

August 6, 2018
12:00 CEST

Zorros Mexico	3–3	(England) Soho FC

Field 9, Tremblay Park
15:00 CEST

Zorros Mexico	0–4	(Czech Republic) GFC Friends Prague

18:00 CEST

Soho FC (England)	1–2	(Czech Republic) GFC Friends Prague

Scheduled crossover matches were 1v3, 2v2, and 3v1

August 7, 2018
09:00 CEST

BeesCats (Brazil)	9–3	Zorros Mexico

Field 9, Tremblay Park
10:30 CEST

GFC Friends Prague (Czech Republic)	3–0	(Algeria) (France) Haraga/BNP Paribas
	forfeit

Field 9, Tremblay Park
15:00 CEST

Cork Rebels (Republic of Ireland)	1–0	(England) Soho FC

Field 7, Tremblay Park

=== Finals stage ===
==== Men's 11s DI ====
Quarter-finals
August 9, Field 1, 16:30 CEST
(Republic of Ireland) Dublin Devils FC	1
(United States) New York Ramblers	0
August 9, Field 2
(United States) West Hollywood	2
(Sweden) Stockholm Snipers	0
August 9, Field 3
(Argentina) Los Dogos	0
(England) Stonewall Lions	1
August 9, Field 4
(France) ARDHIS FC	0
(England) VMFC First	2

Semi-finals
August 10, Field 3, 09:00 CEST
(Republic of Ireland) Dublin Devils FC	1
(United States) West Hollywood	2
August 10, Field 4, 09:00 CEST
(England) Stonewall Lions	1
(England) VMFC First	3

Final
August 11, Honnor Field, 11:55 CEST
(United States) West Hollywood	1(5)
(England) VMFC First	1(4)
Third place
August 10, Field 3, 15:00 CEST
(Republic of Ireland) Dublin Devils FC	2
(England) Stonewall Lions	3

Placement bracket

Semi-finals
August 10, Field 1, 09:00 CEST
(United States) New York Ramblers	0
(Sweden) Stockholm Snipers	3
August 10, Field 2, 09:00 CEST
(Argentina) Los Dogos	3(2)
(France) ARDHIS FC	3(4)

Fifth place
August 10, Field 2, 15:00 CEST
(Sweden) Stockholm Snipers	2
(France) ARDHIS FC	1
Seventh place
August 10, Field 1, 15:00 CEST
(United States) New York Ramblers	3
(Argentina) Los Dogos	2

==== Men's 11s DII ====
Called "D2 Elite" in tournament documents

Quarter-finals
August 9, Field 1, 15:00 CEST
(United States) Minnesota Gray Ducks	2
(Germany) Munchen Streetboys	0
August 9, Field 2
(England) Stonewall Cubs	2
(England) Yorkshire Terriers FC	0
August 9, Field 3
(United States) Rainbow Unicorns	3
(Canada) Toronto	0
August 9, Field 4
(Australia) Sydney Rangers	0
(Mexico) Lobos	2

Semi-finals
August 10, Field 3, 10:30 CEST
(United States) Minnesota Gray Ducks	0
(England) Stonewall Cubs (GG)	1
August 10, Field 4, 10:30 CEST
(United States) Rainbow Unicorns	1(4)
(Mexico) Lobos	1(3)

Final
August 11, Honnor Field, 09:00 CEST
(England) Stonewall Cubs	4
(United States) Rainbow Unicorns	1
Third place
August 10, Field 4, 15:00 CEST
(United States) Minnesota Gray Ducks	3
(Mexico) Lobos	0

Placement bracket

Semi-finals
August 10, Field 1, 10:30 CEST
(Germany) Munchen Streetboys	2(3)
(England) Yorkshire Terriers FC	2(2)
August 10, Field 2, 10:30 CEST
(Canada) Toronto	4
(Australia) Sydney Rangers	0

Fifth place
August 10, Field 4, 16:30 CEST
(Germany) Munchen Streetboys	2
(Canada) Toronto	0
Seventh place
(forfeit)
(England) Yorkshire Terriers FC	3
(Australia) Sydney Rangers	0

==== Men's 11s DIII ====
Called "D2-B" in tournament documents

Quarter-finals
August 9, Field 1, 13:30 CEST
(England) London Falcons FC	1
(Spain) (Japan) GMadrid-Samurai	0
August 9, Field 2
(France) Panamboyz	8
(United States) Boston Strikers	1
August 9, Field 3
(United States) San Diego Sparks	0
(Mexico) Didesex	1
August 9, Field 4
(Scotland) HotScots FC	0(1)
(United States) Jet City Strikers	0(4)

Semi-finals
August 10, Field 3, 12:00 CEST
(England) London Falcons FC	1
(France) Panamboyz	2
August 10, Field 4, 12:00 CEST
(Mexico) Didesex	2
(United States) Jet City Strikers	1

Final
August 10, Field 2, 16:30 CEST
(France) Panamboyz	0(4)
(Mexico) Didesex	0(3)
Third place
August 10, Field 1, 16:30 CEST
(England) London Falcons FC	0(4)
(United States) Jet City Strikers	0(5)

Placement bracket

Semi-finals
August 10, Field 1, 12:00 CEST
(Spain) (Japan) GMadrid-Samurai	3
(United States) Boston Strikers	0
August 10, Field 2, 12:00 CEST
(United States) San Diego Sparks	0(5)
(Scotland) HotScots FC	0(4)

Fifth place
August 10, Field 3, 18:00 CEST
(Spain) (Japan) GMadrid-Samurai	1
(United States) San Diego Sparks	0
Seventh place
August 10, Field 3, 16:30 CEST
(United States) Boston Strikers	1
(Scotland) HotScots FC	4

==== Men's 11s DIV ====
Called "D2-C" in tournament documents

Quarter-finals
August 9, Field 1, 12:0 CEST
(United States) Balls Deep State	2
(United States) Jacks & Goldstars	4
August 9, Field 2
(United States) San Francisco Spikes	3
(England) East End Phoenix FC	0
August 9, Field 3
(England) Stonewall Pride	0(4)
(England) VMFC Reserves	0(3)
August 9, Field 4
(Canada) Vancouver	1(2)
(England) London Titans FC	1(4)

Semi-finals
August 10, Field 3, 13:30 CEST
(United States) Jacks & Goldstars	0(3)
(United States) San Francisco Spikes	0(4)
August 10, Field 4, 13:30 CEST
(England) Stonewall Pride	0
(England) London Titans FC	4

Final
August 10, Field 2, 18:00 CEST
(United States) San Francisco Spikes	0(4)
(England) London Titans FC	0(3)
Third place
August 10, Field 1, 18:00 CEST
(United States) Jacks & Goldstars	1(2)
(England) Stonewall Pride	1(3)

Placement bracket

Semi-finals
August 10, Field 1, 13:30 CEST
(United States) Balls Deep State	0
(England) East End Phoenix FC	3
August 10, Field 2, 13:30 CEST
(England) VMFC Reserves	0(3)
(Canada) Vancouver	0(4)

Fifth place
August 10, Field 5/6, 16:30 CEST
(England) East End Phoenix FC	0
(Canada) Vancouver	1
Seventh place
August 10, Field 7/8, 16:30 CEST
(United States) Balls Deep State	0
(England) VMFC Reserves	3

==== Women's 7s DI ====
Semi-finals
August 9, Field 5, 12:00 CEST
(United States) Philadelphia Flacons & SF Spikes	0
(Mexico) (England) Didesex/Hackney	4
August 9, Field 5, 13:30 CEST
(France) Rosa Bonheur	4
(Australia) Flying Bats WFC	1

Final
August 11, Field 5, 10:45 CEST
(Mexico) (England) Didesex/Hackney
(France) Rosa Bonheur
Third place
August 10, Field 6, 13:30 CEST
(United States) Philadelphia Flacons & SF Spikes	4
(Australia) Flying Bats WFC	1

==== Women's 7s placement ====
Semi-finals
August 9, Field 5, 15:00 CEST
(France) FC Paris Arc en Ciel	2(2)
(Germany) Kaethes Tanten	2(1)
August 9, Field 5, 16:30 CEST
(France) Les Fuegos	5
(Romania) (Austria) (France) Cluj & Graz & Nice United	0

Fifth place
August 10, Field 5, 13:30 CEST
(France) FC Paris Arc en Ciel	3
(France) Les Fuegos	2
Seventh place
August 10, Field 5, 12:00 CEST
(Germany) Kaethes Tanten	0
(Romania) (Austria) (France) Cluj & Graz & Nice United	1

==== Men's 7s DI ====
Quarter-finals
August 9, Field 7, 12:00 CEST
(France) SUD AU CUL	8
(England) Soho FC	0
August 9, Field 8, 12:00 CEST
(United States) Steal Your Manblers	2
(Republic of Ireland) Cork Rebels FC	1
August 9, Field 7, 13:30 CEST
(Brazil) BeesCats	16
(England) Trowbridge Tigers FC	0
August 9, Field 8, 13:30 CEST
(Czech Republic) GFC Friends Prague	2
(United States) FTSC/Falcons	3

Semi-finals
August 9, Field 8, 15:00 CEST
(France) SUD AU CUL	8
(United States) Steal Your Manblers	0
August 9, Field 8, 16:30 CEST
(Brazil) BeesCats	7
(United States) FTSC/Falcons	1

Final
August 11, Field 5, 09:00 CEST
(France) SUD AU CUL	3
(Brazil) BeesCats	2
Third place
August 10, Field 5, 15:00 CEST
(United States) Steal Your Manblers	3
(United States) FTSC/Falcons	1

==== Men's 7s placement ====
Losers' bracket

Semi-finals
August 9, Field 7, 15:00 CEST
(England) Soho FC	0
(Republic of Ireland) Cork Rebels FC	3
August 9, Field 7, 16:30 CEST
(England) Trowbridge Tigers FC	0
(Czech Republic) GFC Friends Prague	3

Fifth place
August 10, Field 7, 13:30 CEST
(Republic of Ireland) Cork Rebels FC	0
(Czech Republic) GFC Friends Prague	5
Seventh place
August 10, Field 6, 12:00 CEST
(England) Soho FC	3
(England) Trowbridge Tigers FC	0

Lower placement

- The intended group phase for the lower Men's 7s teams was abandoned when one of the five remaining teams after the group phase ( (France) Racing Pop) also forfeited. Of the four "group" matches scheduled for August 9, only two were played, with each of the four remaining teams having played one game each. Thus, the competition was adapted to treat the played games as placement semifinals.

Semi-finals
August 9, Field 6, 12:00 CEST
(United States) NY Ramblers	3
(United States) Boston Strikers	1
August 9, Field 6, 15:00 CEST
(Mexico) Zorros	2
(Republic of Ireland) (England) LeftDevils FC	4

Ninth place
August 10, Field 6, 15:00 CEST
(United States) NY Ramblers	5
(Republic of Ireland) (England) LeftDevils FC	0
Eleventh place
August 10, Field 8, 13:30 CEST
(United States) Boston Strikers	2
(Mexico) Zorros	3

== Full time results ==
=== Men's 11s ===
- 1- (United States) West Hollywood SC (Los Angeles, USA) (D1 gold medal)
- 2- (England) Village Manchester FC First (Manchester, UK) (D1 silver medal)
- 3- (England) Stonewall FC Lions (London, UK) (D1 bronze medal)
- 4- (Republic of Ireland) Dublin Devils FC (Dublin, Ireland)
- 5- Stockholm Snipers IF (Stockholm, Sweden)
- 6- Ardhis FC (France)
- 7- (United States) New York Ramblers (New York, USA)
- 8- Los Dogos (Buenos Aires, Argentina)
- 9- (England) Stonewall FC Cubs (London, UK) (D2 gold medal)
- 10- (United States) FTSC Rainbow Unicorns (Washington, DC, USA) (D2 silver medal)
- 11- (United States) Minnesota Gray Ducks Soccer (Minneapolis, USA) (D3 bronze medal)
- 12- Lobos México LGBT (Ciudad de Mexico, Mexico)
- 13- Team München Streetboys (Munchen, Germany)
- 14- Toronto United (Toronto, Canada)
- 15- (England) Yorkshire Terriers FC (Leeds, UK)
- 16- Sydney Rangers FC (Sydney, Australia)
- 17- Panamboyz United/Ballboys Hamburg (Paris, France/Hamburg, Germany)
- 18- Didesex Deporte Lgbt (Ciudad de Mexico, Mexico)
- 19- (United States) Jet City Strikers Rain City SC (Seattle, USA)
- 20- (England) London Falcons FC (London, UK)
- 21- GMadrid Sports/Samurai (Madrid, Spain/Japan)
- 22- (United States) San Diego Sparks (San Diego, USA)
- 23- HotScots FC (Edinburgh, Scotland, UK)
- 24- (United States) Boston Strikers Soccer Club (Boston, USA)
- 25- (United States) San Francisco Spikes SC (San Francisco, USA)
- 26- (England) London Titans FC (London, UK)
- 27- (England) Stonewall FC Pride (London, UK)
- 28- (United States) TC Jacks/Austin Goldstars (Minnesota/Austin, USA)
- 29- Vancouver United OFK (Vancouver, Canada)
- 30- (England) East End Phoenix FC (London, UK)
- 31- (England) Village Manchester FC Reserves (Manchester, UK)
- 32- (United States) FTSC Balls Deep State (Washington, DC, USA)

=== Men's 7s ===
- 1- Sud Au Cul (France) (gold medal)
- 2- BeesCats Soccer Boys (Rio de Janeiro, Brazil) (silver medal)
- 3- (United States) NYR Steal Your Manblers (New York, USA) (bronze medal)
- 4- (United States) FTSC/Falconsoccer (Washington/Philadelphia, USA)
- 5- (Czech Republic) GFC Friends Prague (Prague, Czechia)
- 6- (Republic of Ireland) Cork Rebels FC (Cork, Ireland)
- 7- (England) Soho FC (London, UK)
- 8- (England) Trowbridge Tigers FC (Trowbridge, UK)
- 9- (United States) NY Ramblers 7s (New York, USA)
- 10- (England) (Republic of Ireland) Leftdevils Leftfooters/Dublin Devils (London, UK/Dublin, Ireland)
- 11- Zorros LGBT (Ciudad de Mexico, Mexico)
- 12- (United States) Boston Strikers Soccer Club (Boston, USA)
- 13- Racing Pop (France)
- 14- Haraga United/BNP Paribas (Algeria/France)

=== Women's 7s ===
- 1- Rosa Bonheur (France) (gold medal)
- 2- (England) Didesex/Hackney (Mexico/London, UK) (silver medal)
- 3- (United States) Philadelphia Falcons/SF Spikes (Philadelphia/San Francisco, USA) (bronze medal)
- 4- Flying Bats WFC (Australia)
- 5- FC Paris Arc en Ciel (France)
- 6- Les Fuegos (France)
- 7- Kaethes Tanten (Germany)
- 8- Cluj/Graz/Nice United (Romania/Germany/France)
