= Cowley (surname) =

- Gender: Unisex
- Language: English

Origin
- Languages: 1. English; 2. Irish; 3. Manx

Cowley is a surname in the English language.

== Etymology ==
The surname Cowley has numerous origins. In some cases it originated as a habitational name, derived from any of the several places in England named Cowley. One such place, in Gloucestershire, is derived from two Old English elements: the first, cu, meaning "cow"; the second element, leah, meaning "woodland clearing". Two other places are located in Derbyshire which are derived from the Old English col, meaning "coal" (in reference to charcoal). Another place is located near London, which can has two possible derivations: the first is from the Old English cofa, meaning "shelter" or "bay"; the second possibility is that this place name is derived from the Old English personal name Cofa. Other places are located in Buckinghamshire, Devon, Oxfordshire, and Staffordshire: these place names are thought to be derived from elements meaning "the wood or clearing of Cufa", although they may also contain topographical elements as well. In some cases the surname Cowley is derived from the Irish-language surname Mac Amhlaoibh, meaning "son of Amhlaoibh". The surname Cowley can also be of Manx language origin, where it has the same meaning as that of Irish, and has a variant, Kewley.

== Families ==
The surname has been borne by a noted Irish family, who were one of the so-called 'Ten Tribes of Kilkenny'. The ten families bore the surnames Archdekin, Archer, Cowley, Knaresborough, Langton, Lawless, Ley, Ragget, Rothe, and Shee. Of the ten, only the Shees were considered to be of Irish ancestry; the nine others, including the Cowleys, were of English origin.

== People with the surname ==
- Abraham Cowley (1618–1667), English poet
- R Adams Cowley (1917–1991), American surgeon
- Alan Cowley (1934–2020), British professor of chemistry
- Sir Alfred Cowley (1848–1926), Australian politician
- Alfred Edmeads Cowley (1849–1916), missionary in Sindh, then in western India
- Ambrose Cowley, 17th century English explorer
- Anne Cowley, American astronomer
- Sir Arthur Cowley (librarian) (1861–1931), Bodley's Librarian at the University of Oxford
- Bill Cowley (1912–1993), Canadian ice hockey player
- Charles Henry Cowley VC (1872–1916), British naval officer
- Danny Cowley (born 1978), English professional football coach
- Darren Cowley (born 1976), English former cricketer
- Edward Cowley, New Zealand-Samoan facilitator, entertainer and drag queen
- Elizabeth Jill Cowley (born 1940), British botanist
- Elwood Cowley (born 1944), Canadian former educator and politician
- Ern Cowley (1892–1975), Australian rules footballer
- Francis Cowley (born 1957), English former professional footballer
- Garrick Cowley (born 1982), British rugby player
- Gillian Cowley (born 1955), Zimbabwean hockey player
- Hannah Cowley (artist) (born 1984), British actress and director
- Hannah Cowley (writer) (1743–1809), English dramatist and poet
- Harry Cowley (1890–1971), British social activist
- Jack Cowley (1877–1926), English footballer
- James Cowley (1919–2009), British soldier
- Jason Cowley (born 1966), British journalist, magazine editor and writer
- Jerry Cowley (born 1952), Irish barrister, doctor and politician
- Joe Cowley (baseball), (born 1958), American former professional baseball player
- Joe Cowley (sportswriter), American journalist
- John Cowley (disambiguation)
- Joy Cowley (born 1936), New Zealand novelist
- Leonard Philip Cowley (1913–1973), American Roman Catholic bishop
- Malcolm Cowley (1898–1989), American novelist
- Mario Coyula Cowley, Cuban architect and architectural historian
- Matthew Cowley (1897–1953), American missionary and Mormon leader
- Matthias F. Cowley (1858–1940), American Mormon leader
- Michael Cowley, Australian physiologist
- Neil Cowley (born 1972), British jazz pianist
- Nigel Cowley (born 1953), English former county cricketer
- Patrick Cowley (1950–1982), American musician
- Peter Cowley, British jump racing Champion Jockey (1908)
- Peggy Cowley (1890–1970), American landscape painter
- Philip Cowley, British political scientist
- Richard Cowley (died 1619), English actor
- Richard Colley (c. 1690–1758), the grandfather of Arthur Wellesley, 1st Duke of Wellington, changed his surname to Wesley after he inherited estates from his cousin, Garret Wesley, in 1728
- Robert Cowley (judge) (c. 1470–1546), English-born judge who was Master of the Rolls in Ireland
- Robert Cowley, American military historian
- Roger Cowley (1939–2015), British physicist
- Russell Cowley (born 1983), British ice hockey player
- Samuel P. Cowley (1899–1934), American FBI agent
- Sarah Cowley (disambiguation)
- Simon Cowley (cricketer) (born 1979), English former cricketer
- Simon Cowley (born 1980), Australian former breaststroke swimmer
- Steven Cowley (born 1959), British physicist
- Terence Cowley (1928–2012), Australian cricket player
- Walter Cowley (c. 1500–1548), Irish lawyer and politician
- Wanda Cowley (1924–2017), New Zealand children's writer
- Wayne Cowley (born 1964), Canadian retired professional ice hockey player

=== Fictional ===
- George Cowley, one of the main characters in the TV series The Professionals
