= List of IGLFA member clubs =

The following football clubs (soccer teams) cater to gay or lesbian members and have previously been, or are current member clubs of the IGLFA. Many of the clubs host multiple teams.

== Argentina ==
- Los Dogos DAG
- S.A.F.G.

== Australia ==
- Flying Bats Women's Football Club
- Sydney Rangers Football Club

== Belgium ==
- Pink Devils Mechelen

== Canada ==
- Downtown Soccer Toronto
- Montreal Queer Soccer Club
- Out For Kicks Vancouver Gay Soccer Club
- Toronto United

== Czech Republic ==
- GFC Friends Prague

== Denmark ==
- Pan Fodbold

== France ==
- C.A.R.G.O.
- FC Paris Lutece
- Panamboyz United
- Paris Arc en ciel

== Germany ==
- androGym
- anyway Hot Shots
- Ballboys Hamburg
- Cream Team Cologne
- Kicking Deerns
- Leinebagger Hannover
- Manndecker Frankfurt
- Queerschießer Osnabrück
- Rosa Panther Nürnberg
- Rosa Teufel
- SC AufRuhr
- SC Sternschanze
- Startschuss Hamburg
- Streetboys Munchen
- Stuttgart Ballboys
- Vorspiel Berlin
- Warminia Bielefeld
- Weiberkram e.V.
- Wildboys Karlsruhe

== Great Britain ==
- Charlton Invicta (London)
- Leicester Wildecats
- London Titans
- London Falcons GFC
- Soho FC (London)
- Stonewall F.C. (London)
- Trowbridge Tigers
- Village Manchester FC
- Leftfooters FC (London)
- Mersey Marauders
- Birmingham Blaze
- Nottingham Lions
- Yorkshire Terriers
- Cardiff Dragons
- Hotscots (Edinburgh)
- Saltire Thistle (Glasgow)
- Newcastle Panthers
- Swansea Galaxy FC
- BLAGSS (Brighton)
- Devon Lions (Exeter)

== Iceland ==
- S.C. Styrmir

== Ireland ==
- Dublin Devils F.C.
- Cork Rebels

== Italy ==
- King Kickers
- Black Angels Team
- Godado Mediolanum

== Mexico ==
- AZKATL
- Colima
- DIDESEX AC
- Halcones Gay Sport Mexico
- Imperial MX
- Lobos Mexico
- Tri Gay
- Zorros

== Russia ==
- FC Krylya
- Moscow Minders

== Serbia ==
- Femslam Belgrade

== Spain ==
- G Madrid Sports
- Panteres Grogues

== Sweden ==
- Stockholm Snipers

== United States ==
- Albany Empire
- Austin Goldstars
- Boston Strikers

Baltimore Queer Soccer Club

- CMSA Soccer Club (Chicago)
- Denver GLSC
- Denver Gay Soccer Goal Miners
- Dallas Oak Lawn Soccer Club
- Federal Triangles Soccer Club (Washington D.C.)
- Florida Storm Soccer Club
- Hotlanta Soccer Club
- Long Beach Waverunners FC
- Lobos USA
- Longbeach Waverunners
- Milwaukee Gay Football Club
- Minnesota Gray Ducks
- NetRippers F.C. (Portland)
- New York Ramblers
- Our For Kicks - Detroit Drive
- Philadelphia Falcons
- Rain City Soccer Club (Seattle)
- San Diego Sparks
- San Francisco Spikes
- Twin Cities Jacks
- United F.C. (Florida)
- West Hollywood Soccer Club
