= IGLFA Unity Cup =

Tournament details
- City: Miami Beach (United States)
- Dates: 29 May – 2 June 2017
- Teams: 17 (from 8 associations)

Final positions
- Champions: SAFG (D1); Stockholm Sinpers/Pan Fobold (D2)
- Runners-up: Seattle Stonewall (D1); London Titans (D2)
- Third place: Los Dogos DAG (D1) (D2)
- Fourth place: London/Toronto Stonewall F.C. (D1) (D2)

Tournament statistics
- Matches played: 48

The 2017 IGLFA Unity Cuty was a special international tournament for the IGLFA. It was held in Miami Beach from May 29 through June 2 as part of the 2017 World OutGames. This was the first official IGLFA tournament to be played as part of the World OutGames after the OutGames spun off from the Gay Games, in which the IGLFA usually has its officially recognized world championship events.

The tournament was won by the Seleccion Argentina Futbolistas Gay, their third IGLFA title after a shared Div. 2 win at the 19th IGLFA championship (played as part of the 2010 Gay Games) in Cologne and an outright Div. 1 win at the 20th IGLFA championship in Mexico City. It was the highest-attended international IGLFA tournament by number of clubs (17, from 8 countries) since the 19th IGLFA championship, though had less total teams (16) than the 21st IGLFA championship played as part of the 2014 Gay Games in Ohio.

== Organization ==
As the tournament was already being run mainly by the IGLFA, soccer was just one of three sports to have survived when the OutGames officials announced the morning that the OutGames were to begin that most sporting events and all non-sporting events of the OutGames were to be cancelled, due to a combination of poor turnout for other sports and poor organizational skills by the OutGames officials.

== Tournament structure ==
The Unity Cup ended up unique among IGLFA tournaments in that the "divisions" normally used by IGLFA were determined by the results of the first round of play, as opposed to teams playing in separate divisions based on registration.

The teams were divided into two groups of three and two groups of five. The teams in groups A and B (three teams each) played all opponents in both groups A and B, for five total group stage games. The teams in groups C and D (five teams each) played all opponent in the opposite group, also for five total group stage games.

The four first-place teams at the end of the group stage qualified for the Div. 1 semifinals, while the four second-place teams qualified for the Div. 2 semifinals. Both sets of semifinals were A vs C and B vs D.

This was not the original structure of the tournament, based on the list shown at the Miami OutGames Soccer page which does show registered divisions; the change is likely a function of the collapse of the OutGames. The groups and playoffs structure still reflect this original structure, as the original Division 1 had just six teams, with the Division 1 playoffs being listed on official posters on the A/B half (three teams per group).

== Participating clubs ==
Three teams had originally registered for the tournament but ultimately did not participate: two registered Men's/Mixed Div.2 teams (Burkina Initiative and the San Diego Sparks) and one registered women's team (Malideni). One participating team – Pan Copenhagen – does not appear to have originally registered. All four teams that qualified for the Div.1 playoffs had originally registered as Div.1 teams; a fifth qualified for and won the Div.2 playoffs.

Team^{Reg. Div.}		Div. 1	Div. 2	Open
Didesex AC^{2}	(Mexico)			•
Lobos Mexico^{2}	(Mexico)			•
Los Dogos DAG^{1}	(Argentina)	•		
London Titans^{2}	(England)		•	•
Philadelphia Falcons^{2}	(United States) (Pennsylvania)			•
SAFG^{1}	(Argentina)	•		
San Francisco Spikes^{2}	(United States) (California)		•	
Seattle Stonewall^{1}	(United States) (Washington (state))	•		
Shooting Stars^{2}	???			•
Stockholm Snipers^{1} Pan Fobold Copenhagen^{NA}	(Sweden) (Denmark)		•	
Stonewall F.C.^{1} Toronto^{1}	(England) (Canada) (Ontario)	•		
Storm United^{2}	(United States) (Florida)			•
Sydney Rangers^{1}	(Australia)			•
Village Manchester FC^{2}	(England)			•
Zorros Mexico^{2}	(Mexico)		•	

== Results ==
=== Group stage ===
Note: Scores for the fifth and final matches in group play are generally unavailable. Unless explicitly referenced, the results of the final matches are inferred from knowing which teams made the playoffs.

Group A

Pos	Team	Pld	W	D	L	GF	GA	GD	Pts
1	Los Dogos DAG	4	3	1	0	12	1	+11	10
2	Titans 2 Brewers	4	1	3	0	4	3	+1	6
3	Storm United	4	0	1	3	4	9	−5	1

Group B

Pos	Team	Pld	W	D	L	GF	GA	GD	Pts
1	London/Toronto	4	1	2	1	4	5	−1	5
2	Zoros Mexico	4	2	0	2	3	8	−5	6
3	Philadelphia Falcons	4	1	1	2	4	6	−2	4

May 29, 2017
10:30 EDT

Los Dogos DAG (Argentina)	0-0	(England) London Titans 2 Brewers

Field 1, Miami Beach

Storm United (United States)	0-2	Zorros Mexico

Field 2, Miami Beach

London/Toronto Stonewall F.C. (Canada) (England)	1-1	(United States) Philadelphia Falcons

Field 3, Miami Beach

May 29, 2017
13:30 EDT

Los Dogos DAG (Argentina)	3-1	(United States) Storm United

Field 1, Miami Beach

London Titans 2 Brewers (England)	2-1	(United States) Philadelphia Falcons

Field 2, Miami Beach

London/Toronto Stonewall F.C. (Canada) (England)	2-0	Zorros Mexico

Field 3, Miami Beach

May 30, 2017
09:00 EDT

Los Dogos DAG (Argentina)	3-0	(Canada) (England) London/Toronto Stonewall F.C.

Field 1, Miami Beach

London Titans 2 Brewers (England)	1-1	(United States) Storm United

Field 2, Miami Beach

Philadelphia Falcons (United States)	0-1	Zorros Mexico

Field 3, Miami Beach

May 30, 2017
12:00 EDT

Los Dogos DAG (Argentina)	6-0	Zorros Mexico

Field 1, Miami Beach

London Titans 2 Brewers (England)	1-1	(Canada) (England) London/Toronto Stonewall F.C.

Field 2, Miami Beach

Storm United (United States)	2-3	(United States) Philadelphia Falcons

Field 3, Miami Beach

June 1, 2017
10:30 EDT

Los Dogos DAG (Argentina)	DAG	(United States) Philadelphia Falcons

Field 1, Miami Beach

London Titans 2 Brewers (England)	TBC	Zorros Mexico
	^{A}

Field 2, Miami Beach

Storm United (United States)	1-3	(England) (Canada) London/Toronto Stonewall F.C.

Field 3, Miami Beach

Group C

Pos	Team	Pld	W	D	L	GF	GA	GD	Pts
1	Seattle Stonewall	4	3	0	1	11	3	+8	9
2	San Francisco Spikes	4	2	0	2	2	9	−7	6
3	London Titans XXL	4	1	1	2	7	6	+1	4
4	Sydney Ranges	4	1	0	3	3	7	−4	3
5	Didesex AC	4	0	1	3	0	12	−12	1

Group D

Pos	Team	Pld	W	D	L	GF	GA	GD	Pts
1	SAFG	4	4	0	0	17	0	+17	12
2	Stockholm/Copenhagen	4	2	1	1	4	4	0	7
3	Lobos Mexico	4	3	0	1	7	4	+3	9
4	Village of Manchester	4	2	0	2	6	4	+2	6
5	Shooting Stars	4	1	0	3	3	11	−8	3

May 29, 2017
09:00 EDT

Seattle Stonewall (United States)	0-3	(Argentina) SAFG

Field 1, Miami Beach

London Titans XXL (England)	0-2	(England) Village of Manchester

Field 2, Miami Beach

San Francisco Spikes (United States)	1-0	Shooting Stars

Field 3, Miami Beach

Didesex AC (Mexico)	0-3	Lobos Mexico

Field 4, Miami Beach

Sydney Rangers (Australia)	0-2	(Sweden) (Denmark) Stockholm/Copenhagen

Field 5, Miami Beach

May 29, 2017
12:00 EDT

Seattle Stonewall (United States)	3-0	(Sweden) (Denmark) Stockholm/Copenhagen

Field 1, Miami Beach

London Titans XXL (England)	1-3	Lobos Mexico

Field 2, Miami Beach

San Francisco Spikes (United States)	1-0	(England) Village of Manchester

Field 3, Miami Beach

Didesex AC (Mexico)	0-3	Shooting Stars

Field 4, Miami Beach

Sydney Rangers (Australia)	0-3	(Argentina) SAFG

Field 5, Miami Beach

May 30, 2017
10:30 EDT

Seattle Stonewall (United States)	3-0	Lobos Mexico

Field 1, Miami Beach

London Titans XXL (England)	5-0	Shooting Stars

Field 2, Miami Beach

San Francisco Spikes (United States)	0-1	(Sweden) (Denmark) Stockholm/Copenhagen

Field 3, Miami Beach

Didesex AC (Mexico)	0-3	(Argentina) SAFG

Field 4, Miami Beach

Sydney Rangers (Australia)	3-1	(England) Village of Manchester

Field 5, Miami Beach

May 30, 2017
13:30 EDT

Seattle Stonewall (United States)	5-0	Shooting Stars

Field 1, Miami Beach

London Titans XXL (England)	1-1	(Sweden) (Denmark) Stockholm/Copenhagen

Field 2, Miami Beach

San Francisco Spikes (United States)	0-8	(Argentina) SAFG

Field 3, Miami Beach

Didesex AC (Mexico)	0-3	(England) Village of Manchester

Field 4, Miami Beach

Sydney Rangers (Australia)	0-1	Lobos Mexico

Field 5, Miami Beach

June 1, 2017
09:00 EDT

Seattle Stonewall (United States)	v	(England) Village of Manchester

Field 1, Miami Beach

London Titans XXL (England)	v	(Argentina) SAFG

Field 2, Miami Beach

San Francisco Spikes (United States)	v	Lobos Mexico
	^{B}

Field 3, Miami Beach

Didesex AC (Mexico)	S/C	(Sweden) (Denmark) Stockholm/Copenhagen
	^{C}

Field 4, Miami Beach

Sydney Rangers (Australia)	v	Shooting Stars

Field 5, Miami Beach

^A Either a draw or loss for Zorros as they had been in 1st place 1pt ahead of Stonwall after 4 matches but ultimately placed 2nd in group B
^B Either a draw or loss for Lobos as they had been in 2nd place 2pts ahead of Stockholm/Copenhagen after 4 matches but ultimately missed the playoffs
^C A win for Stockholm/Copenhagen as they had been in 3rd place 2pts behind of Lobos after 4 matches but ultimately qualified for the playoffs

=== Playoffs ===
==== Division 1 ====
SFs: SAFG over London/Toronto (3–1), Seattle over Dogos (--)

Bronze: Dogos over London/Toronto (--)

Gold: SAFG over Seattle (1–0)

==== Division 2 ====
SFs: Stockholm/Copenhagen over Zorros (--), Titans 2 over Spikes (1–0)

Bronze: Spikes TBC Zorros (--)

Gold: Stockholm/Copenhagen over Titans 2 (1–0)
