= 2014 IGLFA World Championship =

Tournament details
- City: Akron, Ohio (United States)
- Dates: 9–15 August 2014
- Teams: 13 (from 5 associations)

Final positions
- Champions: Stonewall F.C. (D1 men); San Francisco Spikes (D2 men); Toronto United (women)
- Runners-up: New York Ramblers(D1 men); United FC (D2 men); Federal Triangles (women)
- Third place: United FC (D1 men); Lobos Mexico (D2 men)
- Fourth place: SAFG (D1 men); Cleveland Fury (D2 men)

Tournament statistics
- Matches played: 59
- Goals scored: 221 (3.75 per match)

The 2014 IGLFA World Championship was the 21st officially recognized world championship event for the IGLFA. It was held in Akron, Ohio from August 9 through 15th as the football (soccer) competition part of the 2014 Gay Games.

The tournament was won by three-time defending Gay Games soccer champions Stonewall F.C. from London, England (after finishing third in the group stage) for their fourth consecutive Gay Games title and tenth overall IGLFA title.

== Participating clubs ==
Team		Men's DI	Men's DII	Women's
Cleavland Fury	(United States) (Ohio)		•	
Didesex AC	(Mexico)		•	
Federal Triangles Soccer Club	(United States) (Washington, D.C.)	•	•	•
Lobos Mexico	(Mexico)		•	
Out for Kicks Detroit Drive	(United States) (Michigan)		•	
Out for Kicks Vancouver Red Stars	(Canada) (British Columbia)	•		
Philadelphia Falcons	(United States) (Pennsylvania)		•	
New York Ramblers	(United States) (New York (state))	•	•	
SAFG	(Argentina)	•		
San Francisco Spikes	(United States) (California)	•	•	
Stonewall F.C.	(England)	•		
Toronto	(Canada) (Ontario)		• •	•*
United FC	(United States) (Florida)	•	•	

*The Toronto Women also participated in the Men's D2 competition

== Results ==
=== Men's Div.I ===
==== Group stage ====
Top four qualify to DI semifinals.

Pos	Team	Pld	W	D	L	GF	GA	GD	Pts
1	New York Ramblers	6	5	1	0	18	3	+15	16
2	SAFG	6	4	1	1	12	7	+5	13
3	Stonewall F.C.	6	4	0	2	13	7	+6	12
4	United FC	6	2	3	1	8	5	+3	9
5	Federal Triangles	6	1	1	4	4	6	−2	4
6	San Francisco Spikes	6	1	0	5	5	13	−8	3
7	OFK Vancouver	6	1	0	5	4	20	−16	3

==== Playoffs ====
Semi-finals
1	New York Ramblers	5
4	United FC	0
2	SAFG	1
3	Stonewall F.C.	3

Championship
1	New York Ramblers	1
3	Stonewall F.C.	2

SAFG did not play the third-place match; third place was awarded to United FC.

=== Men's Div.II ===
==== Group stage ====
Top two teams from each group advance to semifinals.

===== Bracket A =====
Pos	Team	Pld	W	D	L	GF	GA	GD	Pts
1	San Francisco Spikes	5	5	0	0	16	1	+15	15
2	Cleavland Fury	5	4	0	1	22	5	+17	12
3	Philadelphia Falcons	5	3	0	2	22	5	+17	9
4	Federal Triangles	5	2	0	3	5	18	−13	6
5	Toronto Women	5	1	0	4	2	24	−22	3
6	Toronto Selfies	5	0	0	5	0	19	−19	0

===== Bracket B =====
Pos	Team	Pld	W	D	L	GF	GA	GD	Pts
1	United FC	5	4	0	1	14	6	+8	12
2	Lobos Mexico	5	3	1	1	18	2	+16	10
3	Didesex AC	5	3	1	1	13	9	+4	10
4	Toronto United	5	2	2	1	7	1	+6	8
5	New York Ramblers	5	0	1	4	6	22	−16	1
6	Detroit Drive	5	0	1	4	4	20	−16	1

==== Playoffs ====
Semi-finals
A1	San Francisco Spikes	1
B2	Lobos Mexico	0
B1	United FC (KftPM)	2*
A2	Cleavland Fury	2

Championship
A1	San Francisco Spikes	1
B1	United FC	0
Bronze Medal
A2	Cleavland Fury	1
B2	Lobos Mexico	2

=== Women's Div. ===
With only two teams registered to play, full competition was canceled, with only a final played. While the official Gay Games 9 results site names the runner-up as "Global FC", both the official IGLFA site and the FTSC site claim FTSC were the second-place team. The Toronto Women defeated the Federal Triangles Women by a score of 5–1.
