= International Gay and Lesbian Football Association =

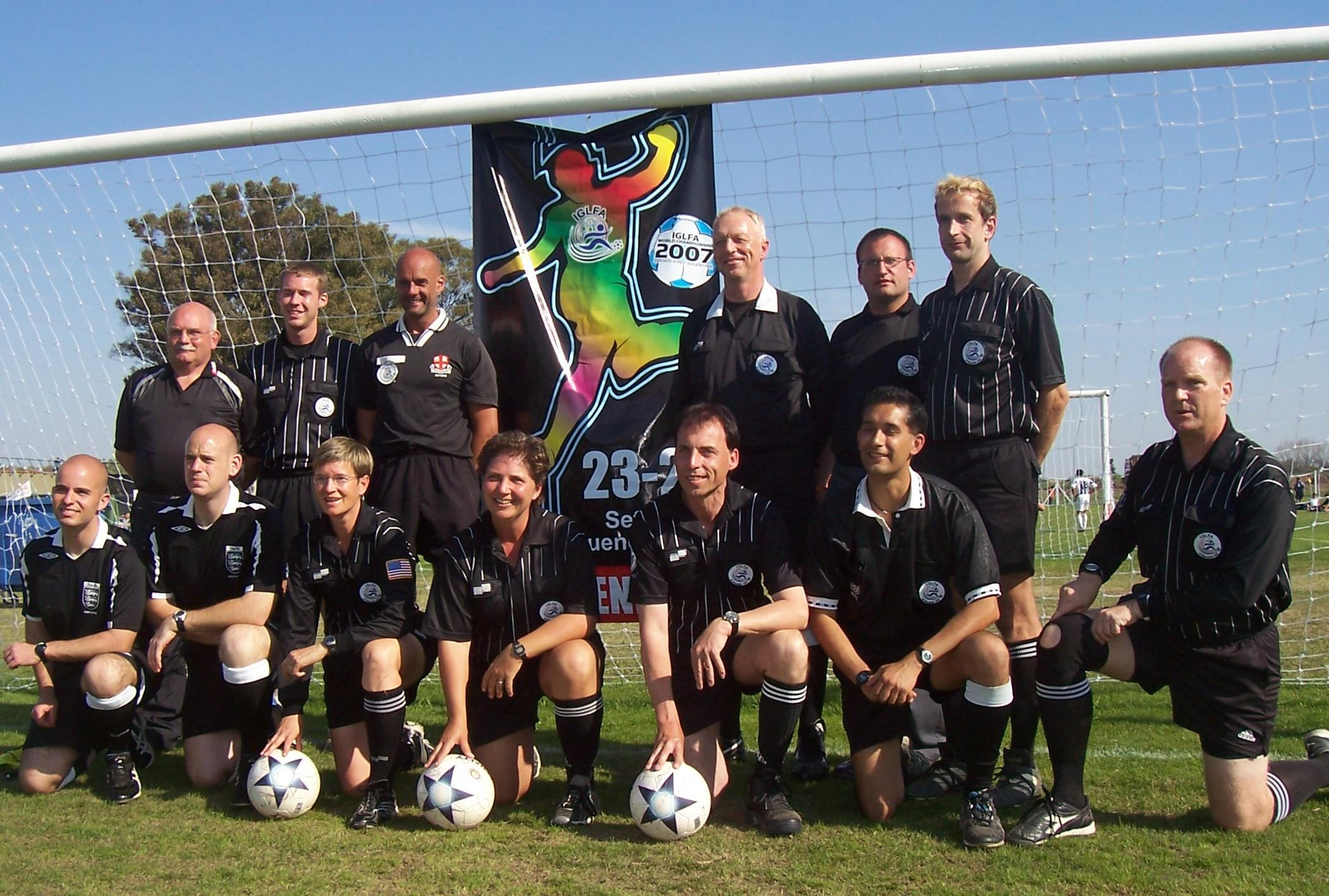
Referees of IGLFA in the Buenos Aires World Cup.

The International Gay and Lesbian Football Association (IGLFA) is an international organization which was founded in 1992 with the intention of promoting association football (known as soccer in the United States and football in most of the rest of the world) in the LGBTQ+ community and to promote queer football to the world at large.

The IGLFA is the governing body of LGBT football and regulates the association football portion of the Gay Games as well as the Official IGLFA World, North American and European Championships.

== History ==
While the IGLFA was formed in 1992, LGBT football teams competed against each other at the first Gay Games in 1982, and an autonomous international championship event was held annually beginning in 1987. Beginning in 1992, a European competition has been held by the IGLFA, though it is separate from the currently-recognized European championship which began in 2011; a North American championship also began in 2011. The IGLFA World Championships were held every year from 1992 to 2010, but now are held only on even-numbered years; odd-numbered years are currently used for the continental championships and other competitions. However, due to the COVID-19 pandemic, there was no 2020 world championship nor any 2021 regional championships.

Beginning in 2019, IGFLA also began recognizing the Sin City Classic, the largest annual LGBT sports event in the world, as the official indoor championship, though the Las Vegas tournament had held soccer tournaments for many years before. This tournament is otherwise known as the IGLFA World Indoor Championship.

All IGLFA tournaments are split into Mixed Gender and Female competitions. Whilst the majority of participants in the mixed gender competition are male, all genders are permitted to participate.

As of February 2020, 39 tournaments have been held, including 7 tournaments before IGLFA, 23 IGLFA World Championships, 4 IGLFA Euro Championships, 2 IGLFA North American championships, 2 official indoor championships, and 1 IGLFA Unity cup. Stonewall FC is the most successful mixed gender club, having won 11 times (1995, 2000, 2001, 2002, 2006, 2008, 2009, 2010, 2011, 2014, 2019). Other clubs who have won the male competition multiple times are San Francisco Spikes (7 times), Cream Team Cologne (3 times), West Hollywood Soccer Club (3 times), SAFG Argentina (2 times), Federal Triangles Soccer Club (2 times), and the Minnesota Gray Ducks (2 times). There are currently no repeat Champions in the female competition.

== World championships ==
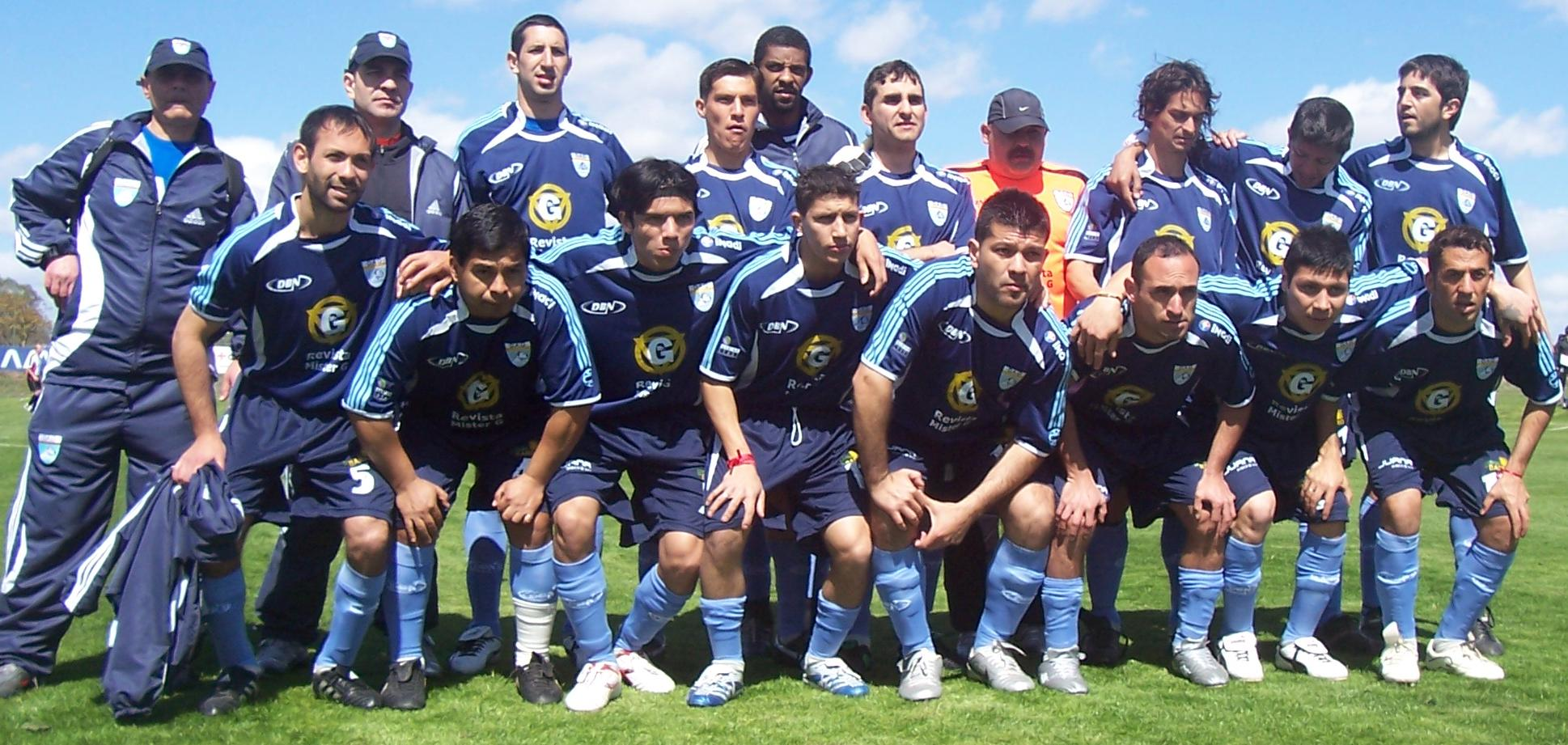
Los Dogos DAG, champions of Buenos Aires Gay World Cup (2007).

The association is affiliated with the Federation of Gay Games and awards the annual Tom Waddell Memorial Trophy (created in 1988) to the winner of its mixed gender tournament (held as part of the Gay Games in years when that event is held).

=== Tournaments and champions ===
Below is a summary of Mixed Gender Div.1, Mixed Gender Div.2, and Female champions at IGLFA's major international tournaments and their predecessors. Parentheses indicate the number of times a city has hosted or the number of times a team has won Div.1 titles and therefore crowned as IGLFA World Champions. Italics represent indoor championships.

Year	Tournament	Host	Mixed Div. 1 Champions	Mixed Div. 2 Champions	Female Div. 1 Champions
1982	Gay Games I	San Francisco	San Francisco Spikes	Not Held / Unknown	Not Held
1983 to 1985	Not Held			Not Held / Unknown	Not Held
1986	Gay Games II	San Francisco (2)	San Francisco Spikes (2,3,4,5)	Not Held / Unknown	Team San Francisco
1987		Denver	San Francisco Spikes (2,3,4,5)	Not Held / Unknown	Not Held
1988		Seattle	San Francisco Spikes (2,3,4,5)	Not Held / Unknown	Not Held
1989		Boston	San Francisco Spikes (2,3,4,5)	Not Held / Unknown	Team Toronto
1990	Gay Games III	Vancouver	Los Angeles Suns	Not Held / Unknown	San Francisco Scotts
1991		Atlanta	San Francisco Spikes (6)	Not Held / Unknown	Not Held
1992	IGLFA WC I	New York City	San Diego Sparks	Boston Strikers	New York Electra
1993	IGLFA WC II	Los Angeles	San Francisco Spikes (7)	Not Held	Not Held
1994	IGLFA WC III; Gay Games IV	New York City (2)	Cream Team Cologne	Cincinnati Sharks	Colorado Beaver Trappers
1995	IGLFA WC IV	Berlin	London Stonewall Lions	Not Held	Team Frankfurt
1996	IGLFA WC V	Dallas	German All-Stars	Not Held	Not Held
1997	IGLFA WC VI	Washington, D.C.	Los Angeles Suns (2)	Philadelphia Falcons	Stochastic Force (Washington D.C., USA)
1998	IGLFA WC VII; Gay Games V	Amsterdam	Cream Team Cologne (2,3)	Los Angeles Eclipse	Team Joost (Netherlands)
1999	IGLFA WC VIII	Fort Lauderdale	Cream Team Cologne (2,3)	Not Held	Berlin Magic Pirates
2000	IGLFA WC IX	Cologne	London Stonewall Lions (2,3,4)	London Apprentices	Towanda 2000 (USA)
2001	IGLFA WC X	London	London Stonewall Lions (2,3,4)	Not Held	Aztec Parma
2002	IGLFA WC XI; Gay Games VI	Sydney	London Stonewall Lions (2,3,4)	The Americans SC	Amhurst Aztecs (USA)
2003	IGLFA WC XII	Boston (2)	Americas SC	Florida Storm	Boston Strikers
2004	IGLFA WC XIII	San Francisco (3)	Florida Storm	Not Held	SF Spykes
2005	IGLFA WC XIV	Copenhagen	Paris PAEC	Japan	Pan Fodbold, Hilde Brand (Denmark)
2006	IGLFA WC XV; Gay Game VII	Chicago	London Stonewall Lions (5)	Boston Strikers	Thunderkitten Madison Wisconsin
2007	IGLFA WC XVI	Buenos Aires	Los Dogos DAG (Argentina)	West Hollywood	Not Held
2008	IGLFA WC XVII	London (2)	London Stonewall Lions (6,7,8,9)	Leicester Wildecats (UK)	Hackney Women's FC (United Kingdom)
2009	IGLFA WC XVIII	Washington, D.C. (2)	London Stonewall Lions (6,7,8,9)	Seattle Jet City Strikers	Philadelphia Falcons exhibition
2010	IGLFA WC XIX; Gay Games VIII	Cologne (2)	London Stonewall Lions (6,7,8,9)	tie: SAFG (Argentina); Los Angeles Eclipse	Hobbergasen Erlangen (Germany)
2011	IGLFA Euro I	Manchester	London Stonewall Lions (6,7,8,9)	London Falcon	Not Held
2011	IGLFA NAmer I NAmer Outgames II	Vancouver (2)	United FC	New York Ramblers	Not Held
2012	IGLFA WC XX	Mexico City	SAFG (Argentina)	Not Held	Not Held
2013	IGLFA Euro II	Dublin	Village Manchester FC	Insaka FC (Ireland)	Alternativa (Russia)
2014	IGLFA WC XXI; Gay Games 9	Cleveland/Akron	London Stonewall Lions (10)	San Francisco Spikes	Toronto United Women
2015	IGLFA Euro III	Hamburg	Vorspiel Berlin I	Cream Team Cologne	FC Krylya
2015	IGLFA NAmer II	Madison	Federal Triangles Soccer Club (1,2)	Not Held	Not Held
2016	IGLFA WC XXII	Portland	Federal Triangles Soccer Club (1,2)	Vancouver SC	Not Held
2017	IGLFA Unity Cup; World OutGames IV	Miami	SAFG (Argentina) (2)	Stockholm Snipers/Pan Fobold	Not Held
2018	IGLFA WC XXIII; Gay Games 10	Paris	West Hollywood Soccer Club (LA Eclipse) (3)	London Stonewall Cubs	Rosa Bonheur
2019	IGLFA Indoor I 2019 Sin City Classic	Las Vegas (ind.)	Minnesota Gray Ducks	San Diego Sparks	Didesex (Mexico)
2019	IGLFA Euro III; EuroGames 2019	Rome	London Stonewall Lions (11)	G Madrid Sports	Jumping Potatoes (Austria)
2020	IGLFA Indoor II; 2019 Sin City Classic	Las Vegas (ind.)	Minnesota Gray Ducks (2)	AZKATL (Mexico)	
2021	Not Held				
2022*	IGLFA Indoor III; 2022 Sin City Classic	Las Vegas (ind.)			West Hollywood Soccer Club
2022*	IGLFA WC XXIV; 30th anniversary worldwide	Washington, D.C. (3)	Federal Triangles Soccer Club	Federal Triangles Soccer Club	West Hollywood Soccer Club
2022*	IGLFA WC XXIV; 30th anniversary worldwide	Sydney (2)	West Hollywood Soccer Club	Minnesota Gray Ducks	West Hollywood Soccer Club
2023*	IGLFA Indoor IV; 2023 Sin City Classic	Las Vegas (ind.)			
2023*	IGLFA NAmer III	St. Pete		CANCELED	
2024	IGLFA Indoor V 2024 Sin City Classic	Las Vegas (ind.)			
2024	IGLFA WC XXV	Buenos Aires (2)			

*The Sydney tournament is still considered part of the 2022 30th anniversary celebrations despite taking coinciding with WorldPride in Feb. 2023.

=== Medalists ===
The following is a list of all clubs that have earned multiple medals at IGLFA-recognized tournaments (since 1992).

Legend

- ## — Mixed gender 1st Division
- ## — Mixed gender 2nd Division
- ## — Mixed gender 3rd Division
- ## — Female 1st Division
- ## — Female 2nd Division
- Italics — Indoor championship
- * — Shared result (combined team or tie)

Club	'92	'93	'94	'95	'96	'97	'98	'99	'00	'01	'02	'03	'04	'05	'06	'07	'08	'09	'10	'11	'12	'13	'14	'15	'16	'17	'18	'19	'20
Argentina
Los Dogos DAG																1st			3rd		3rd					3rd			
Seleccion Argentina Futbolistas Gay SAFG																	2nd		1st*		1st					1st			
Denmark
Pan Fodbold (Copenhagen)														1st								2nd				1st*		3rd*	
France
FC Paris Lutece																						1st		2nd					
Germany
Cream Team Cologne			1st		3rd		1st	1st	2rd	2nd	3rd								3rd					1st					
Streetboys Munchen							2nd				2nd																		
Ireland
Dublin Devils FC																				1st		2nd		2nd					
Mexico
AZKATL																												2nd	1st
AZKATL																													1st
Didesex																											2nd*	1st	
LOBOS																							3rd						3rd
South Africa
The Chosen Few															3rd		2nd												
Sweden
Stockholm Snipers																								3rd		1st*		3rd*	
United Kingdom
Hackney Women's FC															2nd		1st										2nd*		
London Falcons																	3rd			1st								2nd	
London Stonewall [Lions, Apprentices, Cubs]		3rd	2nd	1st	2nd	2nd	3rd		1st	1st	1st				1st	2nd	1st	1st	1st	1st			1st				3rd	1st	
London Stonewall [Lions, Apprentices, Cubs]									1st		2nd						2nd										1st	2nd	
London Titans [XXL, 2Brewers]																2nd						2nd		2nd		2nd		3rd	
Village Manchester FC														2nd						2nd		1st					2nd		
United States
Boston Strikers	1st											1st			1st					2nd									2nd
Dallas Oak Lawn						2nd	2nd																						
Federal Triangles (D.C.)	2nd		3rd											2nd				3rd					2nd	1st	1st		2nd		
Florida Storm												1st	1st		2nd														
Hotlanta SC				3rd								3rd																	
Los Angeles Cobras	2nd	2nd																											
Madison Wisconsin															1st														
Madison Wisconsin															1st														
Minnesota Gray Ducks																											3rd	1st	1st
Minnesota Gray Ducks																												2nd	3rd
Minnesota Gray Ducks																													3rd
New York Ramblers	3rd		3rd								3rd	3rd	3rd		3rd					1st			2nd						
Philadelphia Falcons						1st												1st									3rd*		
Philadelphia Falcons																		2nd											
San Francisco Spikes	3rd	1st		2nd		3rd		2nd		3rd			2nd			3rd							1st		2nd			3rd	
San Francisco Spikes													1st														3rd*		
San Diego Sparks	1st											2nd						3rd		3rd								1st	3rd
Rain City FC [Jet City Strikers, Stonewall FC] (WA)																		1st	2nd	2nd						2nd			
Team Americas SC											1st	1st																	
Twin City Jacks																									2nd				2nd
United FC (FL)																		2nd	2nd	1st			3rd						
United FC (FL)																							2nd						
West Hollywood SC [LA Suns, LA Eclipse, Rockets]			2nd			1st	1st		2nd						2nd	1st		2nd	1st*								1st	3rd	2nd
West Hollywood SC [LA Suns, LA Eclipse, Rockets]																													2nd

== See also ==
- Gay Football Supporters Network
- List of IGLFA member clubs
