= Robert Broughton =

Robert Broughton may refer to:

- Robert Broughton (activist) (born 1950), Canadian cycling activist
- Robert Broughton (cricketer) (1816–1911), English amateur cricketer
- Robert Broughton (MP) (died 1506), English landowner, soldier and Member of Parliament for Suffolk
- Robert Edwards Broughton (1780/1–1860), English army officer and magistrate

== See also ==
- Bob Broughton (1917–2009), American camera effects artist
