= 2016 IGLFA World Championship =

Tournament details
- City: Portland, Oregon (United States)
- Dates: 6–13 August 2015
- Teams: 8 (from 2 associations)

Final positions
- Champions: Federal Triangles (D1 men); Vancouver Out for Kicks (D2 men)
- Runners-up: San Francisco Spikes (D1 men); Twin Cities Jacks (D2 men)

Tournament statistics
- Matches played: 35

The 2016 IGLFA World Championship was the 22nd officially recognized world championship event for the IGLFA. It was held in Portland, Oregon from August 6 through 13, officially hosted by NetRippers F.C.. Group stage and semifinal matches were played at West Delta Park, while final and exhibition matches were played at Providence Park, home of the Portland Timbers (MLS) and Portland Thorns FC (NWSL).

The tournament was won by Federal Triangles Soccer Club from Washington, D.C., the club's second major title after winning the North American championship the previous year. Defending IGLFA world (and Gay Games soccer) champions Stonewall F.C. from London, England did not participate.

== Participating clubs ==
Team		Men's DI	Men's DII	Open	Women's
NetRippers F.C.	(United States) (Oregon)	•		• •	•
New York Ramblers	(United States) (New York (state))	•	×	•	
San Francisco Spikes	(United States) (California)	•	•		
Federal Triangles Soccer Club	(United States) (Washington, D.C.)	•		•	
Out for Kicks Vancouver Red Stars	(Canada) (British Columbia)		• •		
San Diego Sparks	(United States) (California)	•			
Twin Cities Jacks	(United States) (Minnesota)		•		
Rain City SC Scandal	(United States) (Washington (state))				×

×While the official website teams list has three NY Ramblers teams, only two are seen on the schedule & results pages. The registered Seattle women's team similarly did not appear to participate.

== Results ==
=== Men's Div.I ===
==== Group stage ====
Each team played the other four teams once each. Top four qualify to DI semifinals; fifth place to consolation match.

Pos	Team	Pld	W	D	L	GF	GA	GD	Pts
1	New York Ramblers	4	3	1	0	11	5	+6	10
2	Federal Triangles	4	3	1	0	8	3	+5	10
3	San Diego Sparks	4	1	1	2	4	7	−3	4
4	San Francisco Spikes	4	0	2	2	3	6	−3	2
5	NetRippers Black	4	0	1	3	2	7	−5	1

==== Playoffs ====
San Francisco beat New York 4–2 on penalties after playing to a 0–0 draw to advance to the final in Providence Park.

There, they fell 0–1 to Federal Triangles on a 62' free kick goal by FTSC player Zach Straus.

=== Men's Div.II ===
==== Group stage ====
Each team played all other teams once, plus one rematch each (VFC-Spikes and Jacks-United). All four teams qualify to DII semifinals.

Pos	Team	Pld	W	D	L	GF	GA	GD	Pts
1	Vancouver FC	4	4	0	0	10	0	+10	12
2	Twin Cities Jacks	4	3	0	1	7	4	+3	9
3	San Francisco Spikes	4	1	0	3	4	9	−5	3
4	Vancouver United	4	0	0	4	0	8	−8	0

==== Playoffs ====
One of the two semifinals pitted both Out for Kicks sides against each other, with the club's A-team (Vancouver FC) predictably prevailing 6–1.

Vancouver FC then went on to win the final in Providence Park by beating the Twin Cities Jacks by a score of 1–0.

=== Open Div. ===
==== Group stage ====
Each team played all other teams once, plus one rematch each (Gold-Green and Girls-Triangles). Top two teams to open exhibition final.

Pos	Team	Pld	W	D	L	GF	GA	GD	Pts
1	NetRippers Gold	4	3	1	0	24	15	+9	10
2	NetRippers Green	4	2	1	1	21	13	+8	7
3	NY Golden Girls	4	2	0	2	15	18	−3	6
4	Federal Triangles	4	0	0	4	10	24	−14	0

=== Consolation and Exhibition Matches ===
==== DI Div. Consolation/Memorial Match ====
The NetRippers Black competitive squad met the NetRippers 77 squad in a match that was played in memory of NetRippers member Sammy Rodriguez, who was crucial to bringing IGLFA WC22 to Portland. The game ended as a 2–2 draw.

==== Open Div. Exhibition Final ====
NetRippers Green and Gold played to a 2–2 draw in a half-hour (two fifteen-minute halves) exhibition final.

==== Women's Div. Exhibition ====
With only two teams registered to play, full competition was canceled with the Seattle team opting to not participate in the tournament; only an exhibition women's match of all Portland-based players with two twenty-minute halves was played.
