= A. E. Cowley =

A. E. Cowley may refer to:

- Alfred Edmeads Cowley
- Arthur Ernest Cowley
