= John Cowley =

John Cowley may refer to:

- John Cowley (actor) (1923–1998), Irish actor
- John Cowley (British Army officer) (1905–1993), British Army general
- John Cowley (cricketer) (1885–1957), English cricketer
- John Cowley (entomologist) (1909–1967), English entomologist
- John Cowley (racing driver), racing driver who competed at the Bathurst 12 Hour
- John Duncan Cowley (1897–1944), British librarian and author
- John Lodge Cowley (1719–1787), English cartographer, geologist and mathematician
- John M. Cowley (1923–2004), professor at Arizona State University

== See also ==
- Jack Cowley (1877–1926), English footballer
