= Kewley =

Kewley is a surname of Manx origin, derived from Mac Amhlaoibh, meaning "son of Amhlaoibh". It may refer to the following notable people:

- Edward Kewley (1852–1940), English sportsman who played rugby union for England and cricket for Lancashire
- James Kewley Ward (1819–1910), Canadian lumber merchant and politician
- Jennifer Kewley Draskau (died 2024), Manx linguist and historian
- Jeremy Kewley (born 1960), Australian actor; convicted of multiple sexual offences of 16 boys
- John Kewley, several people
- Kevin Kewley (born 1955), English retired professional footballer who played in both England and the United States
- Lisa Kewley, Australian Hubble Fellow in Astronomy at the University of Hawaii Institute for Astronomy
- Vanya Kewley (died 2012), Anglo-French journalist and documentary maker

== See also ==
- Cowley (surname)
