= Edward Cowley =

New Zealand drag queen

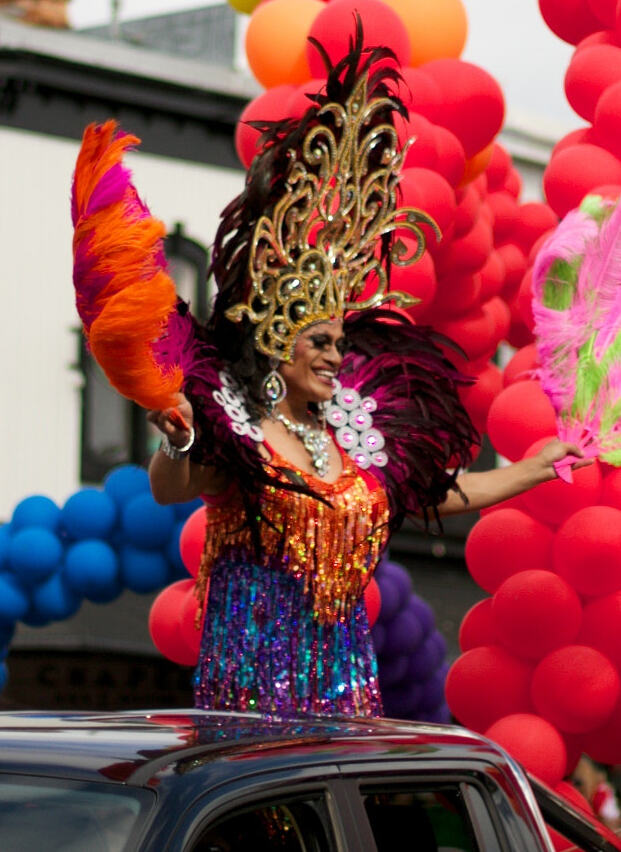
- Edward Cowley performing as Buckwheat at the Auckland Pride Parade in 2013
- Other name: Buckwheat
- Occupation: Drag queen

Edward Cowley is a New Zealand drag queen.

== Career ==
Performing as the drag queen Buckwheat, named after the Our Gang character, Cowley has been active in Auckland's entertainment scene for approximately thirty years, including national television, events with national politicians, hosting an annual flight from New Zealand to the Sydney Mardi Gras and been party to a high-profile media standards complaint. He is a regular feature of the Auckland Pride Parade.

Cowley worked for the New Zealand AIDS Foundation for almost ten years, working in Pacific and Men's outreach.

Cowley competed at the 2010 Cologne Gay Games, coming fifth in the body building. His preparation was filmed for a 20/20 special on drag queens losing weight. He also competed in charity boxing.
