= Gay Football Supporters Network =

The Gay Football Supporters Network ("GFSN") is a U.K. non-profit organisation founded in early 1989 by a small group of gay football fans. This group went on to campaign for the view that homosexuality did not preclude an active interest in and support for the game and the GFSN now encompasses Supporting, Campaigning and Playing elements.

== History and set-up ==
The Gay Football Supporters Network, founded by William Lehauli, began meeting at the Salmon & Compasses public house in Chapel Market, North London in early 1989; it later expanded into a truly national organisation across the UK and now also includes Republic of Ireland citizens as members.

== Supporting ==
The GFSN divides the country up into "regions", with each region having a co-ordinator. This co-ordinator is responsible for arranging social events for members in that region, and members regularly meet to attend matches or simply watch a game at a local pub.

Football fans of different ages and genders meet regularly to discuss their favourite sport and chat. Each co-ordinator submits a monthly report on activities & social events, and these reports are then included in the network's monthly newsletter, which is emailed to members.

== Campaigning ==
As well as providing a forum for gay football supporters to meet, the GFSN also campaigns against anti-homosexual discrimination in support of the FA's "Football For All" programme. The FA encourages all clubs to endorse a gay-tolerant position, parallelling similar calls in the 1980s for clubs to support racial tolerance. The GFSN has worked in collaboration with Paddy Power and Stonewall to support the anti-homophobia rainbow laces initiative.

A monthly GFSN newsletter regularly features articles taken from the national press relating to the topic. The network has also featured in articles printed in The Independent, AXM and The Times.

== Playing ==
Some members prefer to play rather or as well as to watch, and around the UK new football clubs have emerged as members come together to play. The two longest established teams still in existence are Leicester Wildecats FC and Village Manchester FC; both formed in 1996. Teams from the Republic of Ireland are welcomed as associate members and often attend GFSN tournaments.

=== GFSN League ===
Rivalries formed between a number of the members and their clubs, leading to the formation of the GFSN National 11-a-side League in 2002.

Four clubs initially entered the league; Bristol Panthers F.C, Leftfooters F.C, Yorkshire Terriers F.C. and Leicester Wildecats F.C. The inaugural winners of this competition were the Bristol Panthers.

The current champions (2012-13 season) are London Falcons GFC.

=== Tournaments ===
5- or 6-a-side tournaments are hosted by clubs across the country, which are extremely popular events for teams and players to meet-up and socialise. Yorkshire Terriers and Leicester Wildecats have held annual tournaments for more than the last ten years. Other clubs to host tournaments include London Titans FC, Hotscots FC and Bristol Panthers FC.

Leftfooters FC hosted an annual 11-a-side tournament in April at Regent's Park, which is also open to inclusion from European teams.

== GFSN Summer Get-together ==
Coinciding with the GFSN Annual General Meeting of members, a 5-a-side tournament is held with almost all the UK's gay teams taking part over a weekend in late May or early June. It is widely accepted to be the biggest and most anticipated event organised by the GFSN, enabling players and members to socialise over the weekend. A "host" city is chosen each year - voted for by GFSN members throughout the preceding autumn. The result is announced at the annual GFSN Christmas Dinner.

AGM

The GFSN Annual General Meeting is usually held the Sunday morning after the Saturday activities (tournament, watching professional games, party). Here various agenda items are discussed and the members can vote on the committee members for the next 12 months. Venues for the AGM have ranged from bars to Cardiff's Millennium Stadium.

Tournament

The tournament was dominated by the Leicester Wildecats for the first 6 years, but has since been claimed by Brighton Bandits (now called GFC Brighton & Hove) and Yorkshire Terriers, who successfully defended their title in 2006. In 2005, the competition format was altered slightly. All teams initially compete together in a group stage, with the winners progressing to the knock-out phase of the main trophy. Teams that are knocked out of the main competition then transfer to the "Vase" trophy - a less prestigious (yet equally competitive) knock-out competition, with the winner claiming a trophy that is usually a cheap, rusting item bought from a local bric-a-brac store (to emphasise the lack of grandeur compared with the main tournament).

This change was introduced to give competing teams more opportunity to play football, instead of being knocked out early on in the tournament after a short number of games.

Year	Venue	Winners	Vase Winners
1998	(England) Blackpool	Leicester Wildecats	
1999	(England) Brighton	Leicester Wildecats	
2000	(England) Manchester	Leicester Wildecats	
2001	(England) Brighton	Leicester Wildecats	
2002	(England) Birmingham	Leicester Wildecats	
2003	(Wales) Cardiff	Leicester Wildecats	
2004	(England) Blackpool	Brighton Bandits	
2005	(Scotland) Glasgow	Yorkshire Terriers	Leftfooters FC
2006	(England) Newcastle	Yorkshire Terriers	Leicester Wildecats
2007	Dublin	Dublin Devils	Yorkshire Terriers
2008	(England) Liverpool	Nottingham Ballbois	
2009	(Wales) Cardiff	London Falcons GFC	
2010	(England) Blackpool	London Titans	Mersey Marauders
2011	(England) Brighton	Stonewall FC (London)	Stonewall FC 2 (London)
2012	(Scotland) Glasgow	Village Manchester 1	Village Manchester 2
2013	(England) Manchester	London Romans	Village Manchester 2
2014	(England) Leeds	Mersey Marauders	
2015	(England) Norwich		
2016	(England) Leicester	Village Manchester 1	
2017	(England) Manchester	Stonewall FC	Nottingham Lions 1
2018	(England) Newcastle	Newcastle Panthers 1	London Titans Darlings
2019	(England) Liverpool	Mersey Marauders	
2020	No tournament due to Covid	n/a	n/a
2021	(England) Blackpool	East End Phoenix	Village Manchester 3
2022	(England) London	Village Manchester 1	
2023	(Scotland) Glasgow	Village Manchester 1	
2024	(Wales) Cardiff	Mersey Marauders	
2025	(England) Blackpool	Village Manchester 1	
2026	(England) Manchester	Village Manchester 1	London Falcons
The GFSN Vase trophy was introduced for the 2005 competition. 2017 had four divisions. 2021 had five divisions. 2026 had 8 groups that became six divisions.

== See also ==
- GFSN National League
- Homosexuality in association football
- International Gay and Lesbian Football Association
- List of IGLFA member clubs
- List of LGBT sportspeople
