= Charlton Invicta F.C. =

English football club

Charlton Invicta Football Club is a football club based in London, England.

== History ==
Charlton Invicta was founded in 2011. Charlton Invicta have competed in the London Unity League from 2012 and are part of the Gay Football Supporters Network. The club was formerly named Bexley Invicta. The club then became a trust-funded community offshoot of English professional side Charlton Athletic. As a result, the club became the first LGBTQI+ inclusive team to have affiliations with a professional football club.

Even before that, Bexley were known to the community trust of Charlton Athletic. The club is a LGBTQ+-inclusive football club, with both straight and LGBTQ+ players. The club has received a Grassroots Football Award at the Football v Homophobia Awards.
