= Sarah Cowley =

Sarah Cowley may refer to:

- Sarah Cowley (athlete) (born 1984), New Zealand track and field athlete
- Sarah Cowley (nurse), British district nurse and academic
- Sarah Cowley, ambassador of the United Kingdom to Latvia (2013–2017)

== See also ==
- Sarah Crowley, Australian professional triathlete
