= John Kewley =

John Kewley may refer to:

- John Kewley (mine engineer) (1832–1905), captain of the Snaefell mine, Isle of Man
- John Kewley (priest) (1860–1941), Anglican Archdeacon of Man, 1912–1938
