= Robert Edwards Broughton =

British Army officer

Robert Edwards Broughton (1780/1–1860) was a British Army officer, barrister and magistrate. He was elected a Fellow of the Royal Society in 1842.

== Early life and background ==
He was the son of the Rev. Thomas Broughton (1849/50–1811), vicar of Twerton and rector of Bristol St Peter; and grandson of Thomas Broughton. Thomas Duer Broughton was an older brother, and Samuel Daniel Broughton a younger brother, and their mother's name was Jane.

Broughton entered the Inner Temple; its records (for Robert Edward Broughton), show this to be in 1806, that his father's residence was then in Cotham, and that he was the second son. An officer of the 2nd Somerset Militia, he joined the army in 1807 as an ensign.

== Army officer ==
Broughton was a lieutenant in the 9th Foot in 1807, promoted captain in 1812. For his service in the Peninsular War he received the Army Gold Medal with three clasps (Vimeiro, Fuentes de Oñoro, Salamanca). He had worked for two years in Spain as a judge-advocate; after that he exchanged into the Buffs temporarily for a promotion, and served under Colin Campbell, William Gomm and John Shelton.

At the period of the Treaty of Paris of 1814, Broughton took part in the allied occupation of the city. Then, based at Farnham, he studied at the Royal Military College under Howard Douglas. Having married, he left the army on half pay in 1818.

== Later life ==
In 1821 Broughton published a pamphlet "On the Agriculture of this Kingdom". Called to the bar in 1825, he went the home (South Eastern) circuit. He was involved in the chancery case of 1829 following the death in 1826 of John Farquhar, in the role of a trustee. He was a replacement for his brother Henry Arthur Broughton, a solicitor who died in 1832.

In 1833 Broughton was elected a member of the Athenaeum Club, London. He later came onto its Committee of Management. In 1844 he spoke favourably of the role of the RSPCA. Hollis wrote of the RSPCA as an outlier among the groups of "moral reformers", in the way "it built up its own inspection force". Broughton told its annual meeting '"You are the handmaid — the support — the carriers into effect of the acts of the legislature."

=== Police magistrate ===
Broughton was appointed a Metropolitan Police Magistrate by Sir Robert Peel, the Home Secretary, in 1827, sitting on the police court in Shoreditch, at Worship Street. This appointment as a London stipendiary magistrate came at a period when legal training was not a requirement: the Shoreditch bench had had no barrister in the period 1808 to 1816. The model was the Bow Street Office, and the period was just before the foundation of a London police force.

In 1831, there were three Shoreditch magistrates, William Bennett [sic], Samuel Twyford and Broughton. William Be(n)net or Benett was called to the bar in 1806, and appointed a police magistrate in 1817. In 1834 Twyford and Broughton received thanks for their administration of poor relief.

Giving evidence to Parliament's Select Committee on Drunkenness in 1834, Broughton stated that the Beerhouse Act 1830 had had the effect of reducing the public houses that served food, in favour of the gin palace. Broughton's evidence was cited in an 1849 prize essay on "Juvenile Depravity" by the Rev. Henry Worsley.

To the Select Committee on Metropolis Police Officers in 1837, Broughton spoke about intemperance. He was also critical of the inadequate powers given to magistrates by the Distress (Costs) Act 1817, stating that the act was "so trifling, so insignificant in itself that it really leaves us nearly powerless" to deal with the realities of distraint. He was speaking at that time as the senior magistrate at Worship Street, Samuel Twyford having moved to Bow Street Police Court in 1836.

William Grove became the junior magistrate at Worship Street. In 1840 Broughton clashed with Mr. Hamlin, overseer under the New Poor Law of the workhouse in St Luke's parish, over the treatment of a destitute prostitute, Jane Coffee, he as magistrate had sent there for relief. In 1844 he wrote answers on criminal procedure for the 8th Commission Report. In 1846 the junior magistrate at Worship Street was Peregrine Bingham the younger.

Broughton left his post as magistrate at Shoreditch and moved to Marylebone, replacing there John Rawlinson who died in 1847. He remained a police magistrate almost to the end of his life, resigning in 1860.

== Death ==
Robert Edwards Broughton died at home at Melbourne Place, 33 Dorset Square on 29 June 1860, aged 79. John Hampden Gurney, a friend, officiated at the funeral service, and he was buried in East Finchley Cemetery.

== Family ==
Broughton married Caroline Louisa Chamier (died 1873 at age 82), third surviving daughter of John Chamier (died 1832) and his wife Grace Burnaby (daughter of Sir William Burnaby, 1st Baronet), and sister of Frederick Chamier; his brother Thomas had married the eldest daughter Georgiana Sophia in 1814.

Of their children:

- Robert John Porcher Broughton (1816–1911) was a solicitor and cricketer. He married in 1847 Louisa Heaton-Ellis, daughter of Charles Heaton-Ellis of Wyddial Hall and his wife Louisa Stracey, sister of Henry Stracey.
- Henry Vivian Broughton (1818–1893) was a cleric.
- Howard Chamier Broughton (third son, died 1832), died at age 12.
- Harriet Emma (died 1902), eldest daughter, married in 1861 Charles St Clare Bedford (1809–1900), Coroner of Westminster, as his second wife.

Julia Marianne Broughton, the second daughter, died in Bedford in 1898. Maria Leslie Cooper, the last surviving daughter, died in 1911.
