= Kinnon MacKinnon =

Canadian researcher (born 1985)

Kinnon Ross MacKinnon (born 1985) is a Canadian social scientist who researches detransition, gender-affirming healthcare, and gender and sexual minorities. MacKinnon is an Assistant Professor of social work at York University in Toronto.

MacKinnon was also the first trans man powerlifter to win a gold medal at the Gay Games.

== Early life and education ==
MacKinnon was born in Antigonish, Nova Scotia in 1985. He was a junior national athlete from an early age, competing in skiing and snowboarding.

MacKinnon earned a BA from Saint Mary's University in 2007, a BSW from York University in 2010, and a MSW from Toronto Metropolitan University in 2011. He obtained a PhD in Public Health Sciences at the Dalla Lana School of Public Health, University of Toronto.

In 2014, four years after beginning his transition, he became the first transgender person to win a gold medal in powerlifting at the Gay Games. He competed in the male 75 kilogram weight category, pulling a 450-pound deadlift (based on his own 158 pounds, 2.85 times his body mass). In 2015, MacKinnon was named a "Sport Hero" by the Inspire Awards, alongside other LGBTQ+ athletes, Fallon Fox and Mark Tewksbury. His lifelong participation in sports and experiences as a transgender athlete influenced his early interests as a researcher and commitment to LGBTQ+ health promotion and social inclusion.

== Career and research ==
MacKinnon's career as a researcher has focused on understanding gender-affirming healthcare, and the emerging topic of gender detransition. He is an assistant professor of social work at York University in Toronto.

MacKinnon's research has attempted to establish a clearer understanding of how many detransition, and their motivation. According to MacKinnon, between 5 and 10 per cent of people detransition due to a change in their identity.

In 2024, he presented this research at several academic conferences, such as the Pediatric Endocrine Society meeting and at the bi-annual conference of the World Professional Association of Transgender Health in Lisbon, Portugal.

MacKinnon is a frequent media commentator and his research has been covered by major media organizations such as Reuters, The New York Times, Der Spiegel, the Canadian Broadcasting Corporation, Slate, PinkNews, The Atlantic, and The Walrus. MacKinnon was interviewed about his research on detransition for a piece by CBC's The National on youth gender health care. He is an active science communicator and has written about using TikTok to share research with the public.

== Selected publications ==
- 2021. Examining TikTok's potential for community-engaged, digital knowledge mobilization with equity-seeking groups With Kia, H., & Lacombe-Duncan, A. Journal of Medical Internet Research.
- 2021. Preventing "regret": An institutional ethnography of gender-affirming medical care assessment practices in Canada. With Ashley, F., Kia, H., Lam, J., Krakowsky, Y. & Ross, L.E. Social Science & Medicine, 291, 1-9
- 2023. (De)Transphobia: Examining the socio-politically driven gender minority stressors experienced by people who detransitioned. Bulletin of Applied Transgender Studies. With W. Ariel gould, Florence Ashley, Gabriel Enxuga, Hannah Kia and Lori Ross. Bulletin of Applied Transgender Studies 1 (3-4): 235-259
- 2023. Transition-related care experiences and perspectives of individuals who Discontinued their transition or detransitioned in canada. With Gould, W.A., Enxuga, G.E., Ashley, F., Kia, H., Lam, J.H.S., Abramovich, A. & Ross L.E. PLOS One.
- 2024. Discontinuation of gender-affirming medical treatments: Prevalence and associated features in a non-probabilistic sample of transgender and gender-diverse adolescents and young adults in Canada and the United States. With Jeyabalan, T., Strang, J.F., Delgrado-Ron, J.A., Lam, J.H.S., Gould, W.A., Cooper, A., and Salway, T. Journal of Adolescent Health.
