= James Cowley =

British Army officer

Major James Charles Cowley OBE DCM (12 November 1919 – 21 December 2009) was awarded the Distinguished Conduct Medal (DCM) for gallantry whilst serving with the 5th Battalion The Coldstream Guards in Belgium on 9 September 1944.

The Company of which Cowley was CSM was involved in an attack on the village of Hephen in northern Belgium. All the Company platoon commanders had become casualties during the period prior to the attack. The Company Commander was killed during the assault on the village. Cowley assumed command of the Company under most difficult circumstances and held its position which was well forward of its objectives.

Cowley was RSM Glider Pilot Regiment during 1942–43. Following the Second World War he was Regimental Sergeant Major (RSM) 1 (Guards) Parachute Battalion and RSM 1st Battalion Coldstream Guards. He served in the Suez Canal Zone, BAOR and Cyprus. Cowley was commissioned in 1953. He was Camp Commandant of the HQ 1st Independent Guards Brigade Group at Shorncliffe, Kent in 1957 to 1958, when they moved to Cyprus for first, the Iraq emergency in June that year, and following that internal security duties which included being posted to Limassol and Nicosia, returning afterwards to Tidworth Camp. He was promoted to major in the Coldstream Guards in 1964. He retired from the Army in 1968.

Cowley was appointed Military Knight of Windsor in 1981. He was appointed Officer of the Order of the British Empire (OBE) in 1996. He was President of the DCM League and the Gallantry Medallists League from 1974 to 2000. He was a Vice Patron of The Gallantry Medallists' League from 2000.

Major James Cowley OBE DCM died on 21 December 2009. His ashes are in The Deans Cloister in St. George's Chapel in Windsor Castle
