= Robert Broughton (cricketer) =

English cricketer

Robert John Porcher Broughton (11 July 1816 – 15 June 1911) was an English amateur cricketer who played from 1836 to 1864.

== Life ==
Robert Broughton was the son of Robert Edwards Broughton, born at Farnham in Surrey and educated at Harrow School. He matriculated at Clare College, Cambridge in 1835, graduating B.A. 1840 and M.A. 1845.

Mainly associated with Cambridge University and Marylebone Cricket Club (MCC), he made 26 known appearances in important matches. Broughton was an outstanding fielder who specialised at cover point. His grandson, John Cowley, also played.

Broughton died at Callipers Hall, Chipperfield, Hertfordshire in 1911.

== Family ==
Broughton married in 1847 Louisa Heaton-Ellis, daughter of Charles Heaton-Ellis of Wyddial Hall and his wife Louisa Stracey, sister of Henry Stracey.

== Bibliography ==
- Haygarth, Arthur (1996) [1862]. Scores & Biographies, Volume 1 (1744–1826). Kennington: Frederick Lillywhite. ISBN 978-19-00592-23-9.
- Haygarth, Arthur (1997) [1862]. Scores & Biographies, Volume 2 (1827–1840). Kennington: Frederick Lillywhite. ISBN 978-19-00592-23-9.
