= Richard Archdekin =

Richard Archdeacon, alias McGillacuddy (1616–1690), was an Irish Jesuit who wrote Catholic works in both English and Irish.

== Life ==
He entered the Society of Jesus at Mechlin on 28 September 1642. He was in due time enrolled among the professed fathers of the order. He was teaching humanities in 1650, he studied under the Jesuits at Antwerp and Lille, and he arrived at the Professed House at Antwerp 26 March 1653.

For six years, he taught humanities and was professor of philosophy, moral theology, and Holy Scripture for a long period, chiefly at Louvain and Antwerp. His death occurred in Antwerp on 31 August 1693.
