= John Cowley (cricketer) =

English cricketer

Personal information
- Full name: John Norman Cowley
- Born: 7 February 1885; Marylebone, London, England
- Died: 5 August 1957 (aged 72); Bovingdon, Hertfordshire, England
- Relatives: Robert Broughton (grandfather)

Domestic team information
- Years: Team
- 1908–1911: Hertfordshire

Career statistics
Competition	First-class
Matches	1
Runs scored	0
Batting average	0.00
100s/50s	0/0
Top score	0
Catches/stumpings	0/–
- Source: Cricinfo, 25 December 2018

John Norman Cowley (7 February 1885 – 5 August 1957) was an English first-class cricketer.

Born in Marylebone, he was the grandson of first-class cricketer Robert Broughton. Cowley made his debut in minor counties cricket for Hertfordshire against Cambridgeshire at Fenner's in 1908. He played infrequently for Hertfordshire up until 1911, making a total of five appearances in the Minor Counties Championship. He appeared in a first-class cricket match for the Free Foresters against Oxford University at Oxford in 1914. Batting twice in the match, he was dismissed without scoring by John Heathcoat-Amory in the Free Foresters first-innings, while in their second-innings he was dismissed by Orme Bristowe for the same score. He served in the London Regiment during World War I, initially as a private before promotion to lieutenant in February 1915. He died in Bovingdon, Hertfordshire in August 1957.
