= Jack Cowley =

English footballer

Personal information
- Full name: John Bennett Cowley
- Date of birth: 3 February 1877
- Place of birth: Burton upon Trent, Staffordshire, England
- Date of death: 21 December 1926 (aged 49)
- Position: Left half

Senior career*
Years	Team	Apps	(Gls)
–	Hinckley Town		
1899–1902	Lincoln City	68	(3)
1902–1907	Swindon Town	78	(4)
- * Club domestic league appearances and goals

John Bennett Cowley (3 February 1877 – 21 December 1926) was an English footballer who made 68 appearances in the Football League playing for Lincoln City. He played at left half. He also played in the Southern League for Swindon Town.
