= 2014 Gay Games =

LGBT multi-sport event in Ohio, United States

IX Gay Games Cleveland-Akron 2014
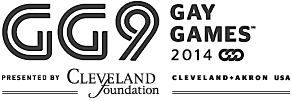
- Host city: Cleveland; Akron
- Country: United States
- Motto: Go all out
- Nations: 50
- Athletes: 8,000
- Events: 37 sports
- Opening: August 9, 2014
- Closing: August 16, 2014
- Opened by: Barack Obama
- Main venue: Quicken Loans Arena
- Website: www.gg9cle.com

The 2014 Gay Games, also known as Gay Games 9 or Gay Games IX, were an international multi-sport event and cultural gathering organized by, and specifically for lesbian, gay, bisexual, and transgender (LGBTQ) athletes, artists and musicians. It was held from August 9 to August 16, 2014 in Cleveland, with some events being held in the nearby city of Akron, Ohio. An estimated 8,000 athletes from more than 50 nations participated in 37 sports and cultural events.

== Bidding process ==
Bids
Boston, Massachusetts, United States
Washington, D.C., United States
Cleveland-Akron, Ohio, United States
Cancelled
Miami, Florida, United States

According to the Federation of Gay Games (FGG), fourteen cities expressed interest in hosting the event. During its annual meeting in Cape Town on October 28, 2008, the FGG announced that four American cities made the deadline and were thus in the running to host the games: Boston, Cleveland, Miami, and Washington, D.C. Of these cities, Boston, Cleveland, and Washington, D.C. submitted bid books by the deadline. The FGG selected Cleveland as the host city on September 29, 2009 during its annual meeting in Cologne, Germany.

== Sponsors ==
On April 13, 2013, the Cleveland Foundation announced a US$250,000 grant as the presenting sponsor of the event, which was to be known as "The 2014 Gay Games presented by the Cleveland Foundation," marking the first time the Gay Games had had a presenting sponsor. In addition to local support from sponsors such as the Cleveland Clinic, the Cleveland Cavaliers, and the Cleveland Indians, the Games saw major corporate sponsorship from large companies like Coca-Cola, Marriott, and United.

The United Church of Christ became the first religious denomination to be a major sponsor of the Gay Games as a fourth-tier silver sponsor of the Gay Games in 2014.

Also announced as a major sponsor was Ernst & Young, with cash and in-kind services.

== Opening ceremony ==
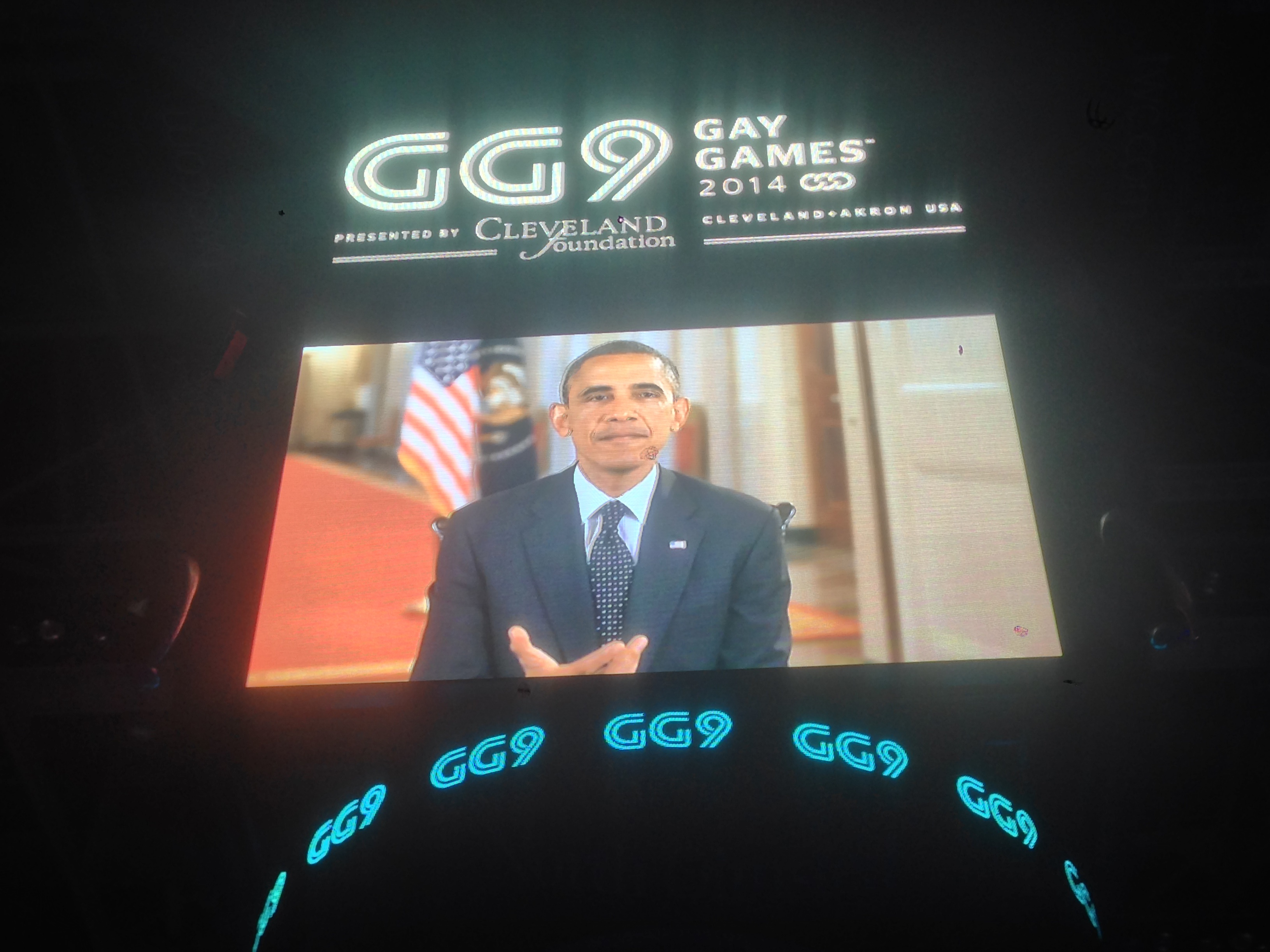
President Barack Obama makes a surprise appearance at the ceremony via video.

The opening ceremony began at 7:00 p.m. on Saturday, August 9, at Quicken Loans Arena. Featured stars at the ceremony included singer, dancer and radio host Lance Bass, Broadway actress Andrea McArdle, Alex Newell from Glee, former Olympian Greg Louganis, and The Pointer Sisters. President of the United States Barack Obama made a surprise video appearance.

== Events and venues ==
The Games featured 37 disciplines of sport and cultural events throughout Cleveland-Akron region.

=== Cleveland ===
Event	Venue
Athletics: road races (5k)	Cleveland Metroparks Zoo
Aquatics: Open Water Swim	Edgewater Park
Badminton	Veale Center (Case Western Reserve University)
Basketball	Woodling Gymnasium
Basketball	CSU Recreation Center (Cleveland State University)
Beach volleyball	Wendy Park (Whiskey Island)
Bodybuilding	Public Music Hall
Cheer	Public Music Hall
Dancesport	Renaissance Cleveland Hotel
Darts	Renaissance Cleveland Hotel
Diving	Robert F. Busbey Natatorium (Cleveland State University)
Racquetball	Veale Center (Case Western Reserve University)
Rowing	Rivergate Park
Sailing	Edgewater Yacht Club
Squash	Veale Center (Case Western Reserve University)
Swimming	Robert F. Busbey Natatorium (Cleveland State University)
Synchronized swimming	Robert F. Busbey Natatorium (Cleveland State University)
Table tennis	Veale Center (Case Western Reserve University)
Tennis	Malaga Complex (Cleveland State University)
Triathlon	East 9th Street Pier at Voinovich Park (North Coast Harbor)
Water polo	Veale Natorium (Case Western Reserve University)
Wrestling	Horsburgh Gymnasium (Case Western Reserve University)
Volleyball	Huntington Convention Center of Cleveland

==== Ceremonies and other events ====
Event	Venue
Chorus	State Theatre
Closing ceremony	Cleveland Mall
Opening ceremony	Quicken Loans Arena
Team band competition	State Theatre

=== Akron ===
Event	Venue
Athletics: road races (10k)	Mustill Store Trailhead
Football (soccer)	Copley Road Soccer Complex
Golf	Firestone Country Club
Marathon and Half marathon start/finish	Akron Civic Theatre
Martial arts	John S. Knight Center
Softball	Cascade Valley Metro Park
Softball	Colonial Salt Field
Softball	Firestone Stadium
Track and field	Lee R. Jackson Track and Field Complex (University of Akron)

=== Other sites ===
Event	Venue	Location
Bowling	The Game of Wickliffe	Wickliffe
Cycling (Criterium)	Downtown Lakewood	Lakewood
Cycling (Road Race/Circuit Race)	Cleveland Metroparks Brecksville Reservation	Brecksville
Cycling (Mountain biking)	Cleveland Metroparks Mill Stream Run Reservation	Strongsville
Figure skating	Serpentiti Arena	Lakewood
Flag football	Barton-Bradley Recreation Field	North Olmsted
Ice hockey	OBM Arena	Strongsville
Pool billiards	Dave & Busters	Westlake
Rock climbing	Kendall Cliffs Climbing Gym	Peninsula
Rodeo affiliated event	Summit County Fairgrounds	Tallmadge

== Records set ==
Brian Jacobson, at age 40, lowered the Masters long course world record in the 50 free to 23.31.

Ida Keeling set the fastest known time by a 99-year-old woman for the 100-meter dash at 59.80 seconds; at the time the relevant USA Track & Field webpage did not include a 100-meter record for US women older than the 90–94 age division.

Kinnon MacKinnon, at age 28, became the first openly transgender man to earn a gold in powerlifting at the Gay Games.

== See also ==
- Federation of Gay Games, the sanctioning body of the Gay Games
- Gay Games
- Principle 6 campaign
- Cleveland-Akron 2014 Home Page
