= Alfred Edmeads Cowley =

Missionary to India

Alfred Edmeads Cowley (1849–1916) was a Church Missionary Society missionary to Sindh Mission or Karachi Mission – then-part of Western India before the independence in 1947.

== Biography ==
Cowley was born in 1849 at Fairford, Rupert's Land—then part of British North America, and now part of Manitoba, Canada. Having been ordained as a deacon on 25 February 1872, he was sent as a Church Missionary Society (CMS) missionary to Karachi, chief station of Sindh Mission in 1872, where he served till 1876 – Sindh Mission was begun in 1850 as a mission to Muslims after the Sindh Province was annexed by British Raj in 1843 – In 1852, a school was started on own expense by Colonel Preedy, the first magistrate of Karachi; later, that school came as a gift to CMS in running the school after his transfer – James Sheldon was the first CMS missionary to Sindh Mission in 1854.

On account of ill health, he returned to England on 14 February 1876, but was later transferred to North-West America to assist his aged-father. Between 1876 and 1881, he was an incumbent for St. Clement's Church, Mapleton – St. Clement's Church became independent of the CMS in 1879. In 1879, he married Hart Davies, principal of Principal of the Ladies' College in Winnipeg, Manitoba. In spite of receiving an offer to return to India in 1880, but could not be carried into effect.

He was made an Honorary Canon in 1910 after serving in positions like rector of St. James, Winnipeg—Assiniboine, and later at Headingly between 1884 and 1911 – served as assistant secretary of CMS from 1881 to 1887 and CMS's co-secretary from 1887 to 1889 – served as rural dean of Selkirk, Manitoba, from 1888 until 1911.
