= Federal Triangles Soccer Club =

Federal Triangles
- Full name: Federal Triangles Soccer Club
- Nickname: The Feds
- Founded: 1990 (35 years ago)
- Website: http://www.federaltriangles.org/

Federal Triangles Soccer Club, otherwise known as Federal Triangles, the Feds or FTSC, is a coed soccer club founded in 1990 by J. C. Cummings and a group of interested players under the umbrella of the DC Sports Association (the GLBT sports group of the time for the Washington, D.C. area). The club runs several tournaments and leagues throughout the year, including the largest amateur tournament of women's indoor soccer in the US, and sponsors multiple men's and women's fall and spring teams. FTSC also organizes regular pickup games, multiple tournaments, and other events throughout the year, including the Rehoboth Beach Classic, United Night Out (UNO, D.C. United's Pride night), and a Turkey Bowl & Thanksgiving Potluck. FTSC is a member of Team DC and the International Gay and Lesbian Football Association (IGLFA), and has nearly 200 paying member players of its own.

FTSC are the reigning (2015) North American champions and 2016 World IGLFA champions.

== History ==
=== 1990-1995: The Beginning ===
Shortly after founding, many GLBT+ soccer clubs (including the New York Ramblers, the Philadelphia Falcons, and the Atlanta Heat) reached out to the as-of-yet-unnamed FTSC to participate in a large upcoming tournament hosted by Atlanta. The club pulled together a coed team for the 1991 tournament; they did not win any medals at the tournament, but earned a highlight 1-0 win over Atlanta's "B team" on a goal by Glenn Auve with a brilliant assist by Heather Milton. Members of the clubs participating in that tournament, including JC Cummings and Heather Milton from FTSC, would ultimately join together to found the IGLFA the following year. FTSC has participated in all major IGLFA tournaments, though after the 1994 Gay Games a large number of women in the club started their own efforts, leaving FTSC as primarily male for several years.

=== 1996-2000: Tournament Hosts ===
By the mid-1990s the Feds had experienced a number of ups and downs. The arrival of Meade Thayer from Boston took the club to a new, more professional direction. Meade had been one of the strong leaders of the Boston Strikers club. He moved to DC for his work, and the Feds were lucky to have him here. Meade tried a number of new coaching ideas and ultimately the club entered a team into the Washington International Soccer League (WISL).

Meade's new leadership at the club pushed FTSC in a more professional direction in the middle of the decade, officially adding a team into the (WISC), founding the tournament that would evolve into the current Turkey Bowl, founding the Rehoboth Beach Classic (1999), and bidding to host the 1997 edition of IGLFA's annual tournament. FTSC won the bid with a group that had experience with the 1994 FIFA World Cup and the 1996 Summer Olympics as well as support from D.C. United, the DC mayor's office, and the DC city council. The 1997 IGLFA tournament was the largest to date, and included a women's tournament for the first time outside of the Gay Games.

=== 2001-2006: Growth and Renewal ===
The winter of 2003-2004 saw the first ever women’s league teams. By 2005, the club had more than doubled in size. The men's teams also continued to grow, with FTSC sending two teams to the annual IGLFA tournament for the first time.

=== 2007-Present: A Mature Club Thrives ===
FTSC continued its strong growth, breaking past 100 members by the end of 2007. The number of women's teams expanded from 2 in 2006 to 5 by 2011 while the number of men's teams increased to 5 as of 2012. The Summer of Freedom league, host by and for FTSC members, was founded in 2010.

Recently, FTSC has earned major tournament success, winning the 2015 North American Division 1 championship, and the 2016 IGLFA Division 1 World Championship in Portland.

== Honors ==
- IGLFA World Championship / The Gay Games
  - Paris 2018: Silver Medal (Men's Div. 2)
  - Portland 2016: Gold Medal (Men's Div. 1)
  - Cleveland/Akron 2014: Silver Medal (Women's Div. 1)
  - Washington DC 2009: Bronze Medal (Women's Div. 1)
  - Copenhagen 2005: Silver Medal (Men's Div. 2)
  - New York 1994: Bronze Medal (Men's Div. 2)
  - New York 1992: Silver Medal (Men's Div. 2)
- IGLFA North American Championship
  - Madison 2015: Gold Medal (Men's Div. 1)
- World Outgames
  - Montreal 2006: Gold Medal

== Name and logos ==
When founded the club had no name, but was existing as the soccer branch of DC Sports. FTSC's invitation to the 1991 Atlanta tournament forced the club's founding members to come determine a name for the club. The name "Federal Triangles" had a dual purpose: the club originally played games near the Federal Triangle Metro Stop, and the pink triangle is a common LGBT symbol. FTSC's original logo was thus a soccer ball imposed on top of a pink triangle.

== Friends and rivals ==
The Philadelphia Falcons were founded one year before FTSC was, and the two clubs established a close bond very early on. Three FTSC members attended a small tournament hosted by the Falcons in the spring of 1991 and highly enjoyed the experience, returning the favor later that year (but before the Atlanta tournament). The two clubs have sent joint teams to several IGLFA tournaments over the years, especially to those hosted outside the United States, the most recent example being a joint team between the two clubs taking part in the Men's 7s competition at the 2018 IGLFA World Championship.
