= 2010 Gay Games =

LGBT multi-sport event in Cologne, Germany

VIII Gay Games Cologne 2010
- Host city: Cologne
- Country: Germany
- Motto: Be part of it!
- Nations: 70
- Athletes: 9,500
- Events: 35 sports
- Opening: July 31, 2010
- Closing: August 7, 2010
- Main venue: RheinEnergieStadion

The 2010 Gay Games (Gay Games VIII) were an international multi-sport event and cultural gathering organized by, and specifically for lesbian, gay, bisexual, and transgender (LGBTQ) athletes, artists and musicians. It was held from July 31 to August 7, 2010 in Cologne, Germany.

== Bidding process ==
On 16 March 2005, the Federation of Gay Games (FGG) announced that Cologne, Johannesburg, and Paris were the official candidate cities for Gay Games VIII in 2010. Cologne was elected in the FGG annual meeting in Chicago on 13 November 2005. The 2010 Games marked the first time the Games were held in Germany, and the second time in Europe (Amsterdam hosted in 1998). In the 2010 Gay Games was Sir Elton John was announced as the ambassador of the games on November 7.

== Participating nations ==
Athletes from 70 countries participated at the 2010 Gay Games. The most athletes came from Germany (2,955), followed by the United States (2,215), the United Kingdom (841), the Netherlands (658) and France (524).

- Angola
- Argentina
- Australia
- Austria
- Belgium
- Brazil
- Bulgaria
- Canada
- Chile
- China
- Colombia
- Croatia
- Czech Republic
- Denmark
- Dominican Republic
- El Salvador
- Estonia
- Finland
- France
- Germany
- Ghana
- Greece
- Guatemala
- Hong Kong
- Hungary
- Iceland
- India
- Indonesia
- Ireland
- Israel
- Italy
- Jamaica
- Japan
- Kenya
- Latvia
- Liberia
- Lithuania
- Luxembourg
- Mexico
- Montenegro
- Netherlands
- New Zealand
- Norway
- Pakistan
- Peru
- Philippines
- Poland
- Puerto Rico
- Russian Federation
- Singapore
- Slovakia
- Slovenia
- South Africa
- Spain
- Sri Lanka
- Suriname
- Sweden
- Switzerland
- Taiwan
- Tanzania
- Thailand
- Turkey
- United Arab Emirates
- United Kingdom
- United States
- Uruguay

== Opening ceremony ==
German Foreign Minister Guido Westerwelle (who was openly gay) attended the opening ceremony on 31 July 2010.

The Official Anthem for the 2010 Gay Games was "Facing a Miracle" by Taylor Dayne in which she performed live.

Also Sir Elton John was announced as an ambassador of the games on November 7.

== Events ==
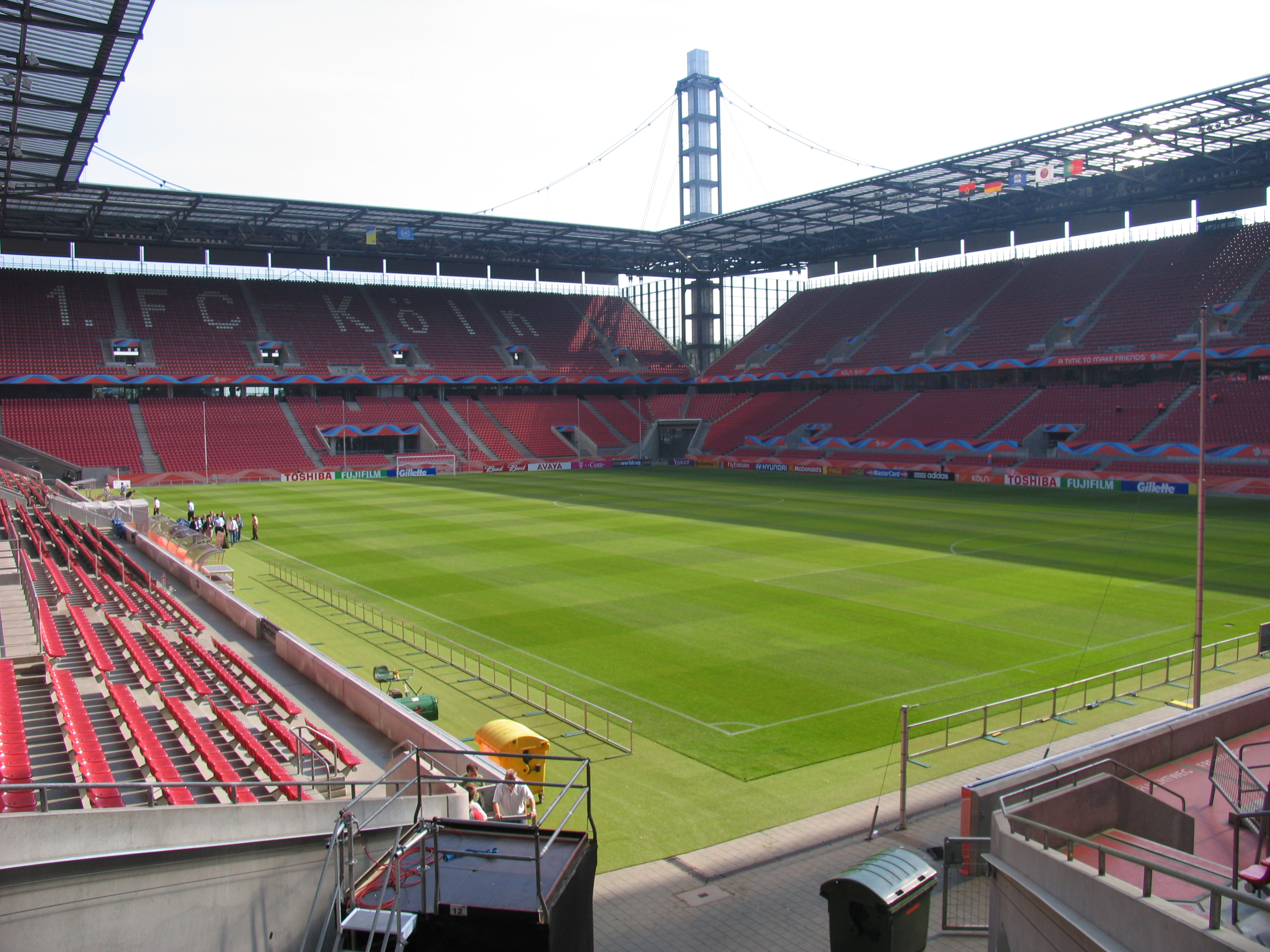
RheinEnergieStadion at Müngersdorfer Sportpark

The event featured 35 sports, accompanied by community and cultural events throughout Cologne and the surrounding area.

Event	Location
Opening and closing ceremonies	RheinEnergieStadion
Synchronized swimming	German Sport University Cologne
Softball	Südstadion Sporting Complex
Cycling	Köln-Longerich
Sailing	Roermond, Netherlands

The 35 disciplines consisted of Badminton, Basketball, Beach-Volleyball, Bodybuilding (Physique), Bowling, Bridge, Chess, Cycling, DanceSport, Diving, Field Hockey, Figure Skating, Golf, Handball, Ice Hockey, Inline Speed Skating, Martial Arts, Pool-Billiards, Powerlifting, Road Races incl. Marathon, Sailing, Soccer (Football), Softball, Sport Climbing, Sport Shooting, Squash, Swimming, Synchronized Swimming, Table Tennis, Tennis, Track and Field Triathlon, Volleyball, Water Polo and Wrestling.

Soccer (football) had the largest participation with more than 1,000 male and female competitors.

== See also ==
- Federation of Gay Games, the sanctioning body of the Gay Games
- Gay Games
- LGBT rights in Germany
- List of LGBT-related organizations
