= New York Ramblers =

- Full name: New York Ramblers Soccer Club
- Founded: 1980
- Website: http://www.nyramblers.com

The New York Ramblers are a soccer club based in New York City, operated by a 501(c)(3) nonprofit organization of the same name. They were founded in 1980 when an ad was placed in the Village Voice looking for gay men interested in playing soccer in an area of Central Park known as the Ramble. This was the birth of the New York Ramblers. The Ramblers provided a space for gay men who enjoyed the sport to meet and socialize outside of the traditional settings of bars and clubs.

Shortly after the beginning of the Ramblers, more gay soccer clubs began forming around the country. In conjunction with this, the original members of these first clubs organized the International Gay and Lesbian Football Association (IGLFA), which today has over twenty women's teams and thirty men's teams in its membership.

The Ramblers have traveled the country and globe participating in various soccer tournaments, from the Philadelphia Pumpkin Patch and Provincetown Classic to the Munich Oktoberfest Tournament and many IGLFA World Championships and Gay Games held throughout the world. The league hosts the New York Indoor Classic held every winter. In addition to weekly matches and practices, the Ramblers also host social events throughout the year and participate in other various leagues in the New York metropolitan area.

Established in 2016 as a means of giving back to the community, the Ramblers Scholarship supports student athletes pursuing an undergraduate education who openly self-identify as LGBT, or as demonstrated and committed straight allies. Ramblers Scholars are awarded for helping to break down stereotypes about LGBT people in sports. As the only scholarship geared toward LGBT student athletes, it serves as a vital resource for many young people who qualify. Following the annual June 1 application deadline, up to two one-time scholarships of $2,500 each are awarded publicly to cover tuition fees.

The principal agenda of the Ramblers is to provide a comfortable and fun space for all people, regardless of their skill, sexual orientation, gender, race or religion; to come together and enjoy the competition and sport of soccer, good friends and to be a part of the ongoing Ramblers family.

== Recent Honors ==
- 2011 North American Outgames - Vancouver
  - Gold Medal (Div. 2)
- 2008 NY Indoor Classic
  - Gold Medal (Div. 2)
- 2007 Toronto International Pride Cup
  - Gold Medal
- 2007 NY Indoor Classic
  - Silver Medal (Div. 1)
- 2006 Pumpkin Patch
  - Silver Medal
- 2006 Gay Games 7
  - Bronze Medal (Div. 1)
- 2006 NY Indoor Classic
  - Silver Medal (Div. 1)
