= Stonewall F.C. =

Association football club in England

Stonewall
- Full name: Stonewall Football Club
- Nickname: Stones
- Founded: 1991
- Ground: London Marathon Community Track, Stratford
- Capacity: 300
- Chairman: Alex Baker
- Manager: Eric Najib/Betty Mayeya
- League: Middlesex County League Premier Division
- 2025–26: Middlesex County League Premier Division, 7th of 17
- Website: http://stonewallfc.com/
Home colours	Away colours	Third colours

Stonewall F.C. is one of Britain's top-ranking LGBTQ+ orientated football teams and the first of its kind to be FA Chartered Standard. The club is open to all, with a sizeable number of players who do not define themselves as LGBTQ+.

Stonewall are affiliated to the London Football Association and play their home games at the London Marathon Community Track, Stratford, London. The club is sponsored by Adidas and EA Sports, and with their support have recently completed the successful launch of a Women/Non-Binary player's branch of the club.

== Structure and current activities ==
Stonewall operates three 11's-focussed teams; the 1sts play in the Middlesex County League Premier Division and the 2nds one step lower in Division 1, both on Saturdays, and the Unity Team in the London Unity League on Sundays. These squads all train during the week, and the club also runs a weekday 5-a-side tournament on Thursdays.

The Women/Non-Binary teams have a 1st, 2nd, and two Development Teams, compete during the week on Sundays, Mondays and Thursdays, and train on Saturdays.

== Club mission and history ==
The club was founded in 1991 by a group of gay footballers including amateur player Aslie Pitter MBE, after Mikko Kuronen put an advert in a gay publication asking for like-minded people to contact him if they were interested in a kickabout on a Sunday. After getting a lot more enquiries than he thought, Stonewall FC was born.

The club's stated mission is "to be a driving force in helping tackle discrimination in the game" be it "homophobia, transphobia or biphobia". The club aims to "be a safe space for anyone who wishes to get involved with football".

In the 2001–02 season, the club won the Middlesex County Football League Senior Division at their first attempt, and were promoted to the Premier Division. The club stayed in the Premier Division until the 2005–06 season when they finished bottom for the second season in a row and were relegated to Division One. After finishing as Runners-up of Division One (Central and East) at the end of the 2008–09 campaign the club were promoted back to the Premier Division. However the club could only stay in the top division of the league for two seasons before being relegated back to Division one (Central and East).

In more recent times the club was promoted back to the Middlesex County Premier Division for the 2017–18 season, but were relegated. After a season of change in the 2018–19 season the club finished 2nd in MCCL D1 and were promoted back to the Premier Division, where they have remained since. The club, in a relatively larger league, equalled its highest (2002–03) league finish of 6th, in the 2021–22 season.

The Women/Non-Binary team trained together for the first time on 8 May 2021 and their Development Team won their Super 5s league for the first time in December 2021.

== Notable games ==
Stonewall's 1sts beat Wilberforce Wanderers 3–1 in a landmark Middlesex County Division 1 game played at Wembley on 30 November 2018, to mark Stonewall and the FA partnering in support of greater diversity in football.

The club also played in the Football for Everyone Cup at The Emirates in 2014, and against Manchester United's LGBTQ+ fan group, the Rainbow Devils, at Old Trafford in 2019.

The Unity Team won the club its first ever LGBTQ+ league on 22 May 2022, beating holders Millwall Romans FC in a must-win final game in LUL (London Unity League) Season 16.

In November 2023, Stonewall won the Gay Games XI in Guadalajara for a record 5th time, defeating Seattle 3–2 in the final.

== Ground and kits ==
Stonewall play their home games at London Marathon Community Track, Stratford, London E20 2ST. This track was built in 2017 as the warm-up track for the 2017 IAAF and IPC World Athletics Championships and is operated as part of the London Stadium. Barn Elms Recreation Ground was their previous home ground.

The Men's 1sts play in blue, the 2nds in red, and the Unity and Women & Non Binary side in a top made up of the colours of the Trans flag. This is one of the first kits of its kind in the world and designed as a show of solidarity with the trans community.

== Honours ==
=== 11-a-side League honours ===
- Middlesex County Football League Senior Division
  - Champions (1): 2001–02
- Middlesex County Football League Division 3
  - Champions (1): 2002–03
- Middlesex County Football League Division one (Central and East)
  - Runners-up (2): 2008–09, 2011–12, 2012–13, 2016–17, 2018–19
- London Unity League
  - Champions (1): 2021–22

=== Cup honours ===
- London AFA Weekend Cup
  - Winners (1): 2015
- Middlesex Federation League Cup
  - Winners (1): 2004
- Middlesex County Football League Premier Division cup
  - Runners-up (1): 2002–03
- Wandsworth And District League Cup
  - Runners up (1): 1993 Wandsworth And District League Cup
    - Runners up (1): 1993

=== LGBTQ+ Cups ===
- Gay Games
  - Gold Medalists (5): 2002 (Sydney), 2006 (Chicago), 2010 (Cologne), 2014 (Cleveland), 2023 (Guadalajara)
  - Silver Medalists (1): 1994 (New York)
  - Bronze Medalists (1): 1998 (Amsterdam)
- European Gay Champions
  - Winners (9): 1992 (Paris), 1993 (London), 1997 (Paris), 2000 (Zurich), 2003 (Copenahagen), 2008 (Barcelona), 2011 (Rotterdam), 2012 (Budapest), 2015 (Stockholm), Helsinki (2016), Rome (2019), Lyon (2025)
  - Runners Up (1): 2004 (Munich)
- IGLFA World Champions
  - Winners (7): 1995 (Berlin), 2000 (Cologne), 2001 (London), 2002 (Sydney), 2006 (Chicago), 2008 (London), 2009 (Washington D.C.)
  - Runners Up (1): 2007 (Buenos Aires)
- London Football For All
  - Winners (1): 2006,
  - Runners Up (1): 2007

=== Minor achievements ===
- Islington Midweek League
  - Champions (1):2001
- Out For Sports
  - Winners (1): 1999 (London)
- West End League
  - Winners (1): 2001

== See also ==
- Gay Games
- Homosexuality in English football
