= Banham =

Banham may refer to:

- Banham (surname)
- Banham, Norfolk
- Banham Conversions
- Banham Poultry
- Banham Zoo
- Banham Patent Locks

== See also ==
- Local Government Commission for England (1992), also known as the Banham Review
- Reddaway v. Banham
