= Michael Foulger =

Managing director of Banham Poultry

Michael Foulger was managing director of Banham Poultry, a firm based in Attleborough. He was also deputy club chairman of EFL Championship club Norwich City

Foulger has been a board member of Norwich City for more than 20 years, after joining as a director in 1996 at the same time as joint majority shareholders Delia Smith and Michael Wynn-Jones joined the board.

A lifelong fan of Norwich, Foulger is credited by the club being "instrumental in supporting Norwich’s Academy", and for providing the money in 2009 that allowed striker Grant Holt to be signed. This amounted to more than £300,000, covering the amount rebated to season-ticket holders following relegation. Two years later, he gave the club £2m in exchange for 80,000 ordinary shares, "for Paul Lambert’s use in the transfer and loan markets".

Foulger owns a racehorse, called Right About Now.
