= Homosexuality in English football =

Presence of LGBTQ players in English football

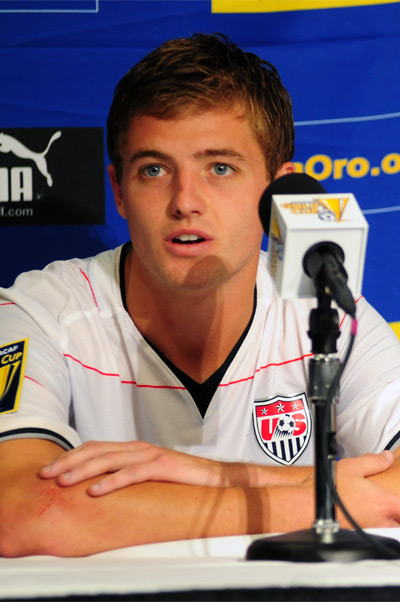
American Robbie Rogers, the 2nd male footballer based in Britain to come out, in 2013; then a free agent, having been released from Leeds United

Homosexuality in English football has been described as a taboo subject by both players and the media. As of January 2026, there are no openly gay male footballers in England's top four men's divisions, with Jake Daniels having left Blackpool F.C. in 2025. Some, such as Peter Clayton, who chairs the FA's "Homophobia in Football" working group, have argued that, in some clubs, there are barriers to male players "coming out", as they are commercial assets which may be damaged. This is complicated by the owners of many clubs being from countries where homosexuality is criminalized.

Conversely, several high-profile England women's players have come out as lesbian including Lily Parr, Lianne Sanderson, Casey Stoney, Kelly Smith, Fara Williams, and Beth Mead, with attitudes around the women's game being more tolerant than the men's.

Homosexuality in England and Wales (but not Scotland or Northern Ireland) was decriminalised in 1967, leading to more liberal public attitudes. While many openly gay politicians and entertainers have remained elected and popular with little comment on their sexuality, men's football has not experienced the same degree of openness. Despite this, or perhaps because of this, rumours in the press or joking between fans and players and even hostile homophobic abuse continue to feature within the game.

In a 2009 survey, most fans said they would like to see homophobia taken out of football, that the FA were not doing enough to tackle the issue and that they would be comfortable to see a player on their team come out of the closet.

== Players and staff in men's football ==
=== Prior to 1967 ===
In 2025, author Grant Bage revealed that while researching former England and Ipswich Town manager Alf Ramsey, he had discovered documents indicating an unnamed Ipswich player had been charged with and had admitted in court to committing an act of gross indecency in 1955, prior to the legalisation of homosexual activity in the United Kingdom. Bage also reported that other documents indicated that Ramsey had supported the player, arguing with the club's directors in favour of his inclusion back in the squad following his conviction.

=== 1990s ===
Justin Fashanu, older brother of fellow footballer John Fashanu, was the first professional footballer to come out as gay, after he agreed to an exclusive with tabloid newspaper The Sun on 22 October 1990. Fashanu claimed to have had an affair with a married Conservative MP who he first met in a London gay bar. A week later, John Fashanu publicly distanced himself from his brother, describing Justin as an "outcast", while Justin's manager Brian Clough famously described him as a "bloody poof". Fashanu was interviewed for the July 1991 cover story of Gay Times, and Fashanu revealed that no club had offered him a full-time contract since the story first appeared. In the morning of 3 May 1998, he was found hanged in a deserted lock-up garage he had broken into, in Shoreditch, London, after visiting Chariots Roman Spa, a local gay sauna. In his suicide note, he stated: "I realised that I had already been presumed guilty. I do not want to give any more embarrassment to my friends and family," in reference to allegations of sexual assault made against him.

=== 2010s ===
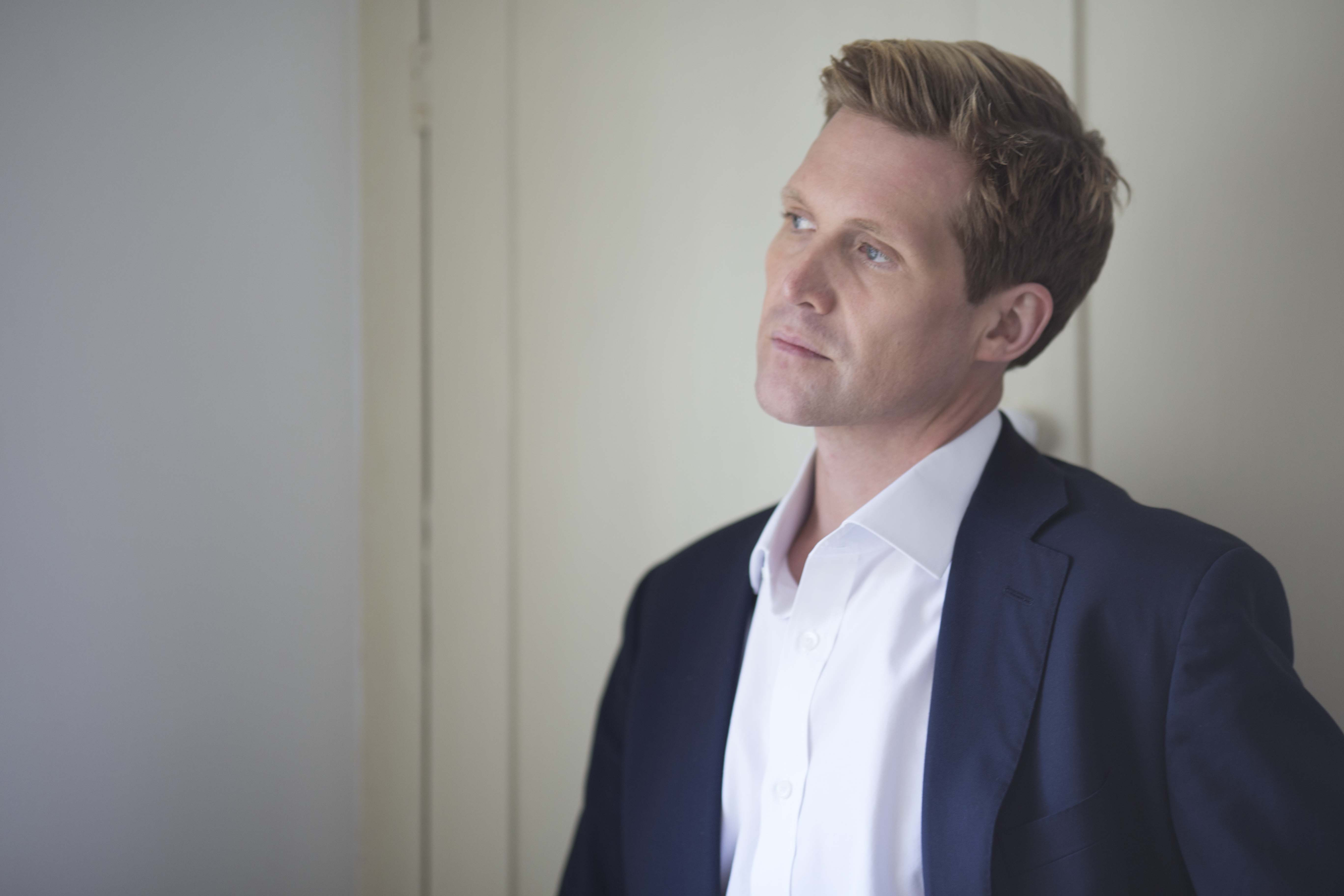
David Haigh was the first openly gay managing director of an English football club.

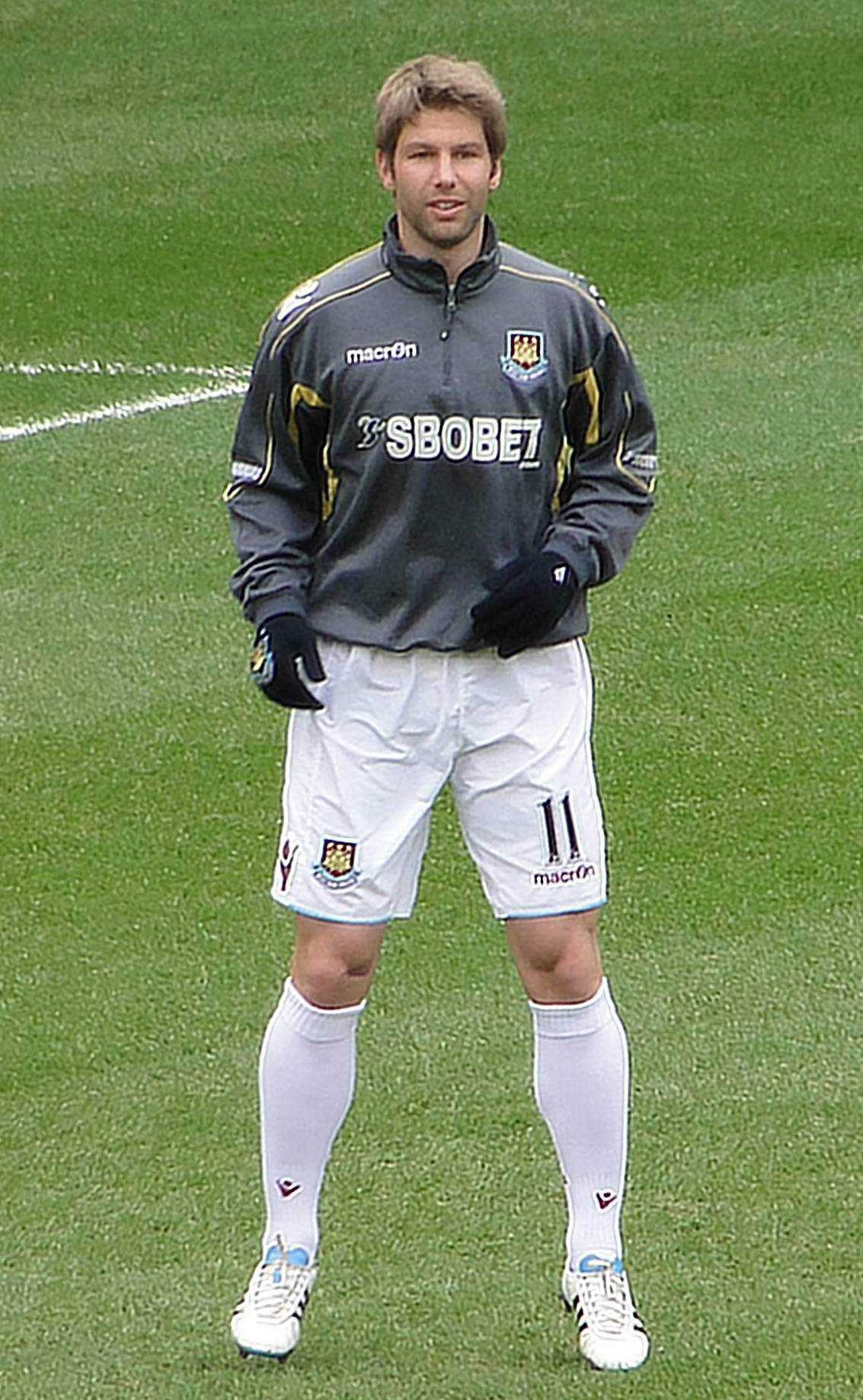
German Thomas Hitzlsperger (pictured) "came out" after retirement from football; he is currently the only openly gay player to have played in England's Premier League.

In February 2013, American Leeds United player Robbie Rogers came out as gay, becoming the second male soccer player in Britain to do so after Justin Fashanu in 1990. Also in 2013, David Haigh became the first openly gay managing director of an English football club.

Liam Davis, a non-league player with Gainsborough Trinity, revealed in 2014 that he had been out as gay for four years; he is the country's only openly gay male semi-professional player.

Following a series of injuries, German player Thomas Hitzlsperger retired from football in September 2013. After his retirement, he came out as gay, the highest-profile male footballer in the world to do so. In November 2017, Pink News credited David Haigh along with Robbie Rogers and Thomas Hitzlsperger with paving the way for LGBT players and managers in football. Hitzlsperger had played in the Premier League while closeted. He stated in January 2014 that he thought it would be a long time before an active player in the league would come out. Players such as John Ruddy, Richarlison and Lucas Digne have spoken about their belief that a gay teammate would be accepted and supported.

In August 2017, Ryan Atkin came out as gay, becoming the first openly gay match official in English football. In 2025, former Premier League referee David Coote came out as gay, saying he had hidden his sexuality during his career for fear of receiving abuse.

In July 2019, an anonymous Twitter account called 'The Gay Footballer' announced that they were a professional footballer playing in the EFL Championship. After saying they intended to come out publicly, they later deleted the account.

=== 2020s ===
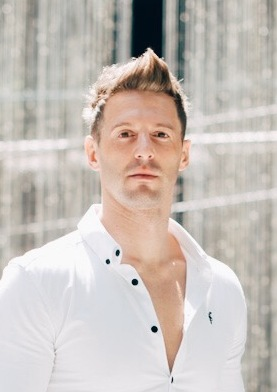
Thomas Beattie came out after retirement

In June 2020, retired player Thomas Beattie came out as gay in an interview with ESPN. In February 2022, he told Goal.com that his career-ending injury was the catalyst for revealing his sexuality.

No player has ever played in the English Premier League while openly gay. In July 2020, a current Premier League player revealed he was gay but would or could not come out.

On 16 May 2022, Blackpool player Jake Daniels came out as gay, making him the only current gay male professional footballer in the UK. He said that doing so would allow him to be "free and confident", and it was described by the BBC as a "watershed moment".

In 2025, retired defender Tony Powell publicly came out as gay. His experiences of being a closeted gay footballer were explored in the documentary The Last Guest of the Holloway Motel. He had, incidentally, been a teammate of Justin Fashanu at Norwich City during the 1970s and 1980s.

As of January 2026, there are no openly gay male footballers in England's top four men's divisions, with Jake Daniels having left Blackpool F.C. when his contract expired in June 2025.

== Homophobia in men's football ==
The gay rights group Stonewall published a report in August 2009 which described English football as "institutionally homophobic". In January 2022, manager Ian Holloway said he felt English football was homophobic. In August 2025, Kick it Out reported a rise in sexism and transphobia.

=== Against homosexual players ===
Justin Fashanu, the first black £1 million footballer, became in 1990 the first footballer to be openly gay. In his autobiography, Brian Clough recounts a dressing down he gave Fashanu after hearing rumours that he was going to gay bars: "'Where do you go if you want a loaf of bread?' I asked him. 'A baker's, I suppose.' 'Where do you go if you want a leg of lamb?' 'A butcher's.' 'So why do you keep going to that bloody poofs' club?'". Fashanu died by suicide in 1998 after he was questioned by police when a seventeen-year-old boy accused him of sexual assault, and it has been suggested that the tragedy and hostility that struck his life after publicly coming out persuaded other gay footballers that coming out would not be a good idea. The coroner said the prejudices he experienced, plus the sexual assault charge he was facing at the time of his death, probably overwhelmed him.

Gay player Thomas Hitzlsperger wrote in his 2024 autobiography that while playing at West Ham, a teammate made a homophobic comment in the dressing room, which caused Hitzlsperger to continue concealing his homosexuality. He added that when that teammate ironically asked the rest what it would be like to have a gay player in the dressing room, another player angrily replied: "And what would be the fucking problem if there was one?"

=== Against heterosexual players ===
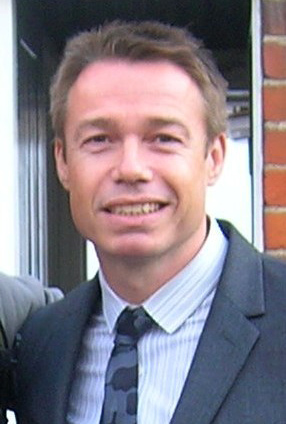
Graeme Le Saux, who received homophobic abuse

Heterosexual players, such as Sol Campbell, Ryan Allsop, Billy Gilmour and Conor Gallagher have been the victim of homophobic abuse by fans. Another heterosexual player, Graeme Le Saux, was homophobically abused by fellow player Robbie Fowler.

Graeme Le Saux, an England international left-back, endured homophobic taunts despite being married to a woman with children. The rumours allegedly began because of his "unladdish hobbies", which included antique collecting, and his university background. He later admitted he had considered quitting the game because of the abuse and the humiliation he felt. One example of the public abuse he suffered came in a Premier League match between Chelsea and Liverpool on 27 February 1999. Le Saux became involved in a running series of taunts with Liverpool striker Robbie Fowler. With Le Saux preparing to take a free-kick, Fowler repeatedly bent over and pointed his backside in the Chelsea player's direction. Despite the obvious taunts, Le Saux, who refused to take the free-kick, was booked for delay of play. Unseen by the match officials, Le Saux later struck Fowler on the edge of the Chelsea penalty area. Both were later charged with misconduct by the FA.

In 2008, Sol Campbell received homophobic abuse from Tottenham Hotspur fans while playing for Portsmouth. Campbell is also married to a woman with three children. Prior to this, in 2005, his brother was jailed for 12 months after assaulting a classmate who suggested that the defender was gay. In 2009, a man and a boy were found guilty of shouting homophobic chants at Campbell in a match between Portsmouth and Spurs. In January 2019, Campbell spoke out about the homophobic abuse he had recently received. He had also been the victim of similar abuse in 2014.

In February 2026, Hull City fans were arrested for homophobic chanting at Chelsea players and fans. Later that month, Cardiff City were charged by the FA following homophobic chanting by its fans, also against Chelsea. Hull were later fined £30,000 for the incident, and some fans were banned.

In March 2026, Manchester United player Jack Fletcher received a 6-match ban after using a homophobic slur during a match.

=== By fans ===
On multiple occasions there have been reports of homophobic chanting by fans attending matches, and arrests made or fines issued to fans and clubs. In December 2011, a Southampton fan was banned for three years for homophobic chanting. In August 2019, Bristol Rovers were fined by the FA for homophobic chanting by their fans. In December 2019, Brighton players were subjected to homophobic abuse by Wolves fans; two people were arrested. On 1 February 2020, two West Ham United fans were arrested in London Stadium by the police for directing homophobic chants towards Brighton & Hove Albion fans during a Premier League match.

In January 2023, there were alleged homophobic chants by Nottingham Forest fans, aimed at Chelsea fans, by Manchester United fans against Everton manager Frank Lampard (who used to play for Chelsea), by Manchester City fans, also aimed at Chelsea, and by Liverpool fans against Chelsea, for which three people were later arrested. The FA said that they would charge the clubs whose fans had targeted Chelsea, with the chant in question having been defined as a homophobic slur by the Crown Prosecution Service in January 2022. In March 2023 there were homophobic chants during a match between Leeds United and Brighton, with Leeds later being fined £150,000. In April 2023, three Wolverhampton Wanderers fans were arrested following homophobic chanting during a match against Chelsea. In July 2023, a Fulham fan was banned for three years for homophobic chants, and later that month, Wolverhampton Wanderers were fined £100,000 due to homophobic chants by their fans. In May 2023, a LGBTQ+ Manchester United supporters group criticised chanting from their own fans against opposition players.

In September 2024, Tottenham Hotspur fans engaged in homophobic chanting against Man Utd. The club was later charged by the FA. In November 2024, a Port Vale fan was ejected for alleged homophobic abuse during a match against Wrexham.

In April 2025, Millwall F.C. was charged after fans had homophobically abused Ben Chilwell. In May 2025, West Ham United were fined £120,000 after fans had used homophobic chants against Chelsea, and in June 2025, Tottenham Hotspur were fined after homophobic slurs from fans against Manchester United.

=== By the press ===
In February 2006, The News of the World claimed that two Premiership footballers were involved in a gay orgy with a figure in the music industry, allegations repeated in The Sun. Despite being unnamed by the papers, Ashley Cole brought legal action and won apologies and damages from both publications.

After England's exit from the 2006 World Cup, Peter Tatchell complained about the "homophobic smearing" against Portugal's Cristiano Ronaldo. The Sun described the player as a "nancy boy" and a "pretty boy".

=== By those in the game ===
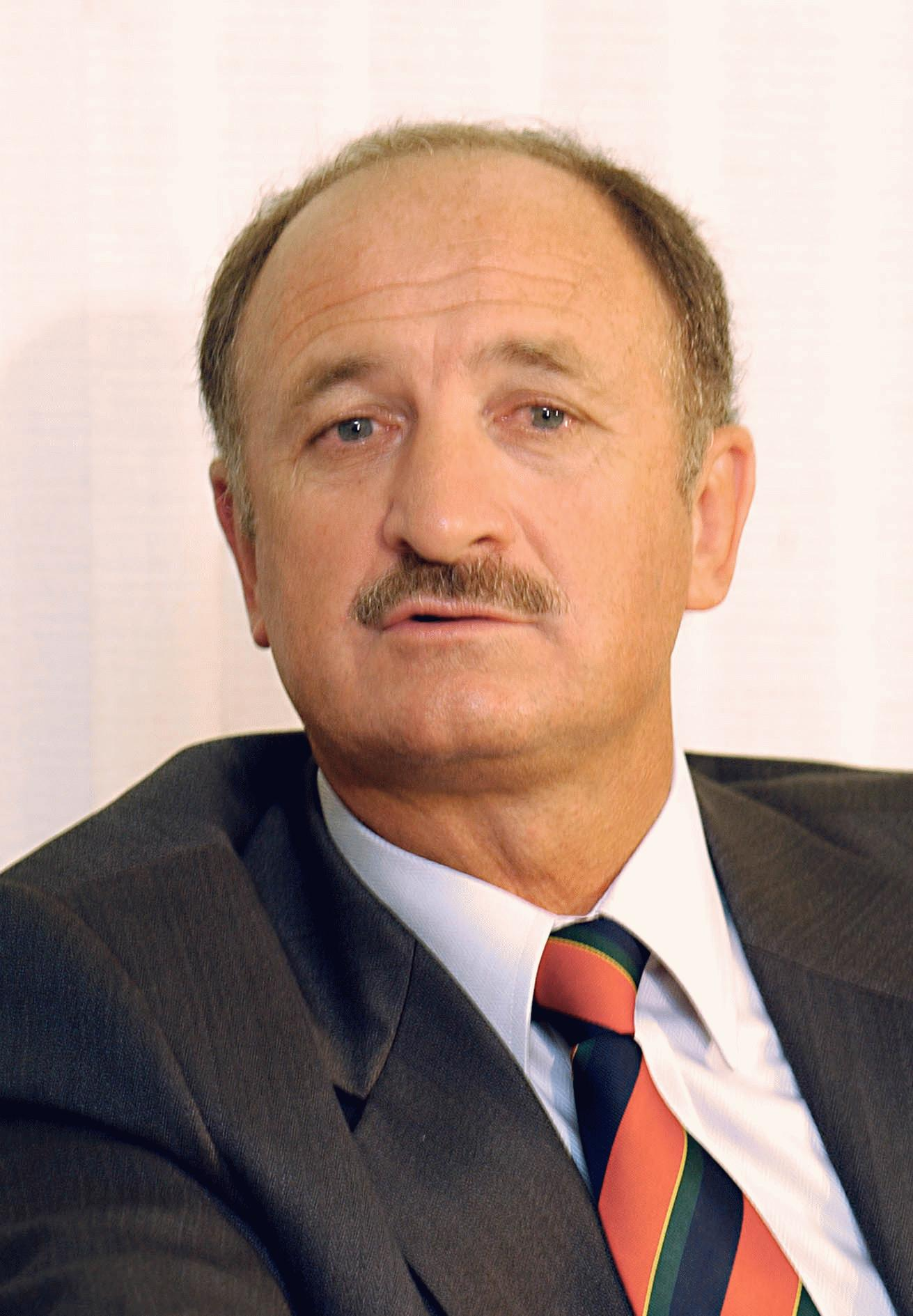
Luiz Felipe Scolari

Ex-Chelsea manager Luiz Felipe Scolari is on record as stating he would have thrown out of the team a player whom he found to be gay. He made the comments during Brazil's 2002 FIFA World Cup campaign. Later, denying that he was homophobic, he stated that his friends "include[d] people whose sexual preference is different from my own".

In November 2005, BBC News ran an article describing how homosexuality was still considered "taboo" in football. Djibril Cissé, partly in jest, had said that he refused to kiss his team-mates after scoring a goal for fear of being thought of as gay. Public relations mogul Max Clifford said that two major clubs had approached him to help make players portray a "straight" image.

I've had players over the years who were single and read books and so others [other players] said they must be gay... I think being openly gay would be something very difficult to live with in football... You can get drunk and beat up your wife and that's quite acceptable, but if someone were to say 'I'm gay', it's considered awful. It's ridiculous.

— Former manager Alan Smith speaking on "the last taboo in football".

In October 2006, England international Rio Ferdinand caused controversy by calling BBC Radio 1 DJ Chris Moyles a 'faggot' live on air, just days after team-mate Paul Scholes was also in trouble for an alleged homophobic remark about him being gay with a funny hairdo. Moyles jokingly asked Ferdinand: "If you had to, who would you rather go out with – Smudger [Alan Smith] or Scholesy [Paul Scholes]?". Ferdinand replied: "That is not my bag that, that is not my game, talking about going out with geezers", and when Moyles suggested he would always prefer Smith, Ferdinand declared: "You're a faggot." He quickly apologised for what he had said, stating "I'm not homophobic".

In 2010, the FA planned to shoot a video designed to discourage anti-gay hate-chants on the terraces. Reportedly, they were unable find a player from the Premier League willing to endorse the video and production was postponed. Pundits believed that players were still scared to associate themselves with homosexuality.

In August 2014, Malky Mackay and Iain Moody were accused of sending each other racist, sexist and homophobic text messages. Moody left his job as sporting director of Crystal Palace as a result. Mackay apologised for the texts. The League Manager's Association defended Mackay, claiming that the texts were merely "banter"; the LMA later apologised for this. Mackay denied being racist, sexist or homophobic.

In April 2014, Colin Kazim-Richards was found guilty of making a homophobic gesture at Brighton fans. In December 2021, Walsall player Manny Monthe was banned for seven matches for making a homophobic comment during a game.

In April 2025, Tranmere player Sam Finley received a 13-match ban and a fine after homophobically abusing an opposition player.

In February 2026, Reading's kitman Richard Bone received a six-game ban after admitting making a homophobic comment against a referee in a match.

== Efforts to reduce homophobia in men's football ==
=== By the FA ===
In 2005, the Football Association held a summit aimed at tackling homophobia in football. In that same year, when the BBC asked all of the twenty Premiership managers their opinions on the issue as part of an investigation, all twenty refused. From 2007 onwards, homophobic chanting at football grounds was explicitly outlawed by the FA.

The prominent gay rights activist Peter Tatchell joined a Football Association campaign against homophobia in football in 2008, but later left stating the organisation does not take the matter seriously.

In February 2012, the FA released a video showing a discussion on homophobia in English football between former players Ady Williams, John Scales and Brendon Batson.

=== By clubs ===
Tottenham Hotspur have a system in place to allow fans to report any anti-gay chanting and Manchester City are the first Premiership club to have been recognised by pressure group Stonewall as a gay-friendly employer.

In 2009, a football team was named after openly gay footballer Justin Fashanu. The Justin Fashanu All-stars is open to both homosexual and heterosexual players. Team members also created initiative and campaign the Justin Campaign (co-founders included artist Jason B. Hall and Juliet Jacques) that got recognized by both the Prime minister and the FA, later transformed into a more international 'Football v Homophobia' campaign. In February 2014, it was revealed that only 11 of the Premier League's 20 teams, and only 17 of the Football League's 72 teams, had joined the 'Football v Homophobia' campaign.

In July 2012, Liverpool F.C. announced their participation in Liverpool Pride, and in August of the same year, Liverpool F.C. became the first Premier League club to officially be represented at a UK pride event. Liverpool F.C. have also hosted the Football v Homophobia tournament early in 2012.

In December 2013, Leeds United became the first Stonewall Diversity Champion in English football, championing gay equality within the club and wider football. Openly gay managing director David Haigh organized a Pride-themed game despite the owners being from a country that criminalizes homosexuality. He said:

“I had a spectacular falling out with the owners after what was essentially ‘Gay Day’ at Leeds – we had Robbie there, we had Stonewall banners all around the ground. I angered them massively. I didn’t care, it was the right thing to do."

Former Leeds United player Robbie Rogers, who was one of the first male professional footballers to come out as gay, launched his 'Beyond It' anti-discrimination charity with David Haigh at the club.

In 2013, Stonewall in conjunction with Paddy Power, launched the 'Right Behind Gay Footballers' campaign, distributing rainbow coloured laces to every professional football player in the UK. The aim of the campaign was to ask players to show support for gay football players and to "kickstart a fundamental change in attitude." Players from 52 different clubs wore the laces to show support for gay players, and the campaign received over 320 million Twitter impressions, making it one of the most successful Twitter campaigns in the UK to date.

In 2014, Stonewall teamed up with Paddy Power again, in addition to Metro and the Premier League, to lead the second year on the 'Right Behind Gay Footballers' campaign.

In 2015, Ryman Premier Division team, Dulwich Hamlet, hosted a friendly match against Stonewall FC, the Gay World Champions, on Wednesday 11 February (KO – 7.30pm). The match coincided with Lesbian Gay Bisexual Transgender History Month, which took place throughout February. It also formed part of Dulwich Hamlet's ongoing anti-homophobia campaign. Dulwich won the match 6–0.

In November and December 2024, Premier League clubs launched a 'Rainbow Laces' campaign, which included club captains wearing rainbow armbands. Ipswich captain Sam Morsy refused on "religious" grounds, whilst Crystal Palace captain Marc Guehi wrote "Jesus loves you" on his rainbow armband, which he said was a message of "truth and love and inclusivity". Both players were spoken to by the FA, but no further action was taken. Manchester United also abandoned their plan to wear supporting jackets after one player refused to take part, with The Athletic naming Noussair Mazraoui. Gay ex-footballer Thomas Hitzlsperger later applauded the captains who did wear the rainbow armbands.

=== By authorities ===
In 2022, the Crown Prosecution Service for England and Wales decided that a chant commonly used by fans to mock Chelsea F.C. players could be considered a hate crime. The slang term, "rent boys," a slang for male sex workers, was used as a dig at the area's historic reputation as a gay hotspot.

=== By fans ===
One survey by Staffordshire University in 2010 showed that more than 90% of football fans would not hold any hostility to a footballer coming out, and suggested that most fans would stand by a gay player who played for their club. The survey showed that most fans expected there would be an openly gay footballer by 2015, and that this would be good for improving the attitude towards homosexuality in the sport.

=== By players ===
Heterosexual Swedish international and former Arsenal and West Ham United midfielder Freddie Ljungberg endured questions over his sexuality "due to his bachelor lifestyle and love of musicals and fashion". Despite denying the speculation, he told the New York Times that "I don't mind at all. I am proud of that. I love fashion, and I think so many gay people have amazing style. So that is a compliment to me."

The Guardian's Secret Footballer columnist said in 2011 that a gay player would be accepted in a typical dressing room, and instead said that the worry for any would-be gay player would be the abuse from the terraces.

In August 2023, player Aaron Ramsdale, whose brother is gay, said he would begin calling out homophobia in the sport.

=== Coming out publicly ===
Arguments have been made for and against gay and bisexual male players to come out publicly.

==== Barriers ====
Figures such as agent Max Clifford have advised gay players to keep their sexuality a secret for the sake of their careers, saying that to be openly gay would potentially damage their playing prospects. This would also apply abroad, where even if accepted in England a gay player might face a new barrier if he wished to play in a country less accepting of homosexuality. Coming out would undoubtedly bring a gay player abuse from the terraces, and perhaps elsewhere too; this would affect some players more than others.

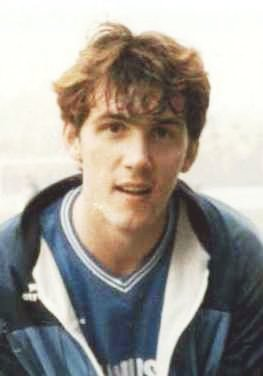
Tony Cascarino recommended that gay players keep their sexuality secret.

"It's a very sad state of affairs. But it's a fact that homophobia in football is as strong now as it was 10 years ago. If you'd asked me in 2000 whether I thought we'd have a famous, openly gay footballer by 2010 I would have said yes.

— Max Clifford says why he would and has advised gay players to stay closeted.

The reaction to Justin Fashanu after he publicly came out may set a worrying precedent for those considering whether to publicly announce their sexuality.

"Would a player mind if he found out a team-mate was gay? Probably. Players wouldn't want to be left alone with him, they wouldn't want to shower with him. Before you rush to criticise, would you find it acceptable for a man to walk around a women's dressing-room? More importantly, team-mates would be self-conscious around the player. The sexual banter would develop an uncomfortable edge if it continued. It is an undesirable scenario for a manager, since an uneasy and divided squad is not a recipe for success. A gay player himself would probably feel equally ill-at-ease. Dressing-rooms are like perverted nudist camps. Immature, wild places, little self-contained states where the normal rules of common decency and acceptable behaviour do not apply. Sexual activity and bodily functions are props players use for pranks and banter."

— Former Republic of Ireland international Tony Cascarino expresses a gay player's worst fears and believes that football dressing rooms are not mature enough to accept gay players.

==== In favour of coming out ====
Burnley goalkeeper Anders Lindegaard said that "homosexuals are in need of a [footballing] hero".

"You hate to see homophobia out there, and you don't want to hear it or have it in the clubs, but if there are any gay players they should just come out. That may sound heartless, and I am sure if you are gay there are all sorts of fears and worries, but I do think football can probably cope with it."

— Former Scotland and Chelsea player Pat Nevin was teased by teammates for his interest in the arts despite his heterosexuality, however, Nevin was unaffected by the jibes and feels that homophobia in football is overestimated.

On the occasion of 2019's World Pride, the Boumerang Foundation published a report aiming to debunk the myth that footballers coming out as gay damages their commercial viability. The publication, authored by Rayyan Dabbous from New York University, analyzes the media appeal of LGBT figures such as Anderson Cooper and Neil Patrick Harris, whose coming out did not hinder their ability to take on roles perceived as "masculine" such as moderating a presidential debate or portraying playboy Barney Stinson in How I Met Your Mother.

== Women's football ==
=== Players and staff ===
Several high-profile England women's players have come out as lesbian including Lily Parr, Lianne Sanderson, Casey Stoney, Kelly Smith, Fara Williams, and Beth Mead, with attitudes around the women's game being more tolerant than the men's.

English Football Hall of Fame inductee Lily Parr was openly a lesbian at a time when female homosexuality, whilst (unlike male homosexuality) not illegal, was very much a taboo in British society. She totalled 967 goals in her career between 1919 and 1951.

In August 2010, Hope Powell, the openly gay coach of the England women's team, was named in 68th place on The Independent newspaper's Pink List of influential lesbian and gay people in the UK.

Many players have come out since then, including Casey Stoney, captain of the England women's team, who came out in February 2014. In recent years far more players have come out with several high-profile players entering civil partnerships or marriage with their partners once they became legal in 2005 and 2015 respectively.

=== Homophobia ===
Though lesbian and bisexual players are generally more accepted in women's football than men's, they do still experience homophobia. In November 2024, couple Sam Kerr and Kristie Mewis were subjected to homophobic abuse after announcing they were expecting a baby together.

== LGBTQ teams and organizations ==
The Gay Football Supporters Network was founded in 1989 to campaign for gay rights in English football. In 2002, the GFSN National League was formed by GFSN members who wanted to participate in amateur competition as well as support major professional teams. The league continues today and consists of gay teams.

Stonewall F.C. was founded in 1991 by Aslie Pitter and others after he faced homophobia while playing on existing teams. Stonewall Football Club is currently Britain's highest-ranking gay football team and are on the verge of going semi-professional.

In 2009, a football team was named after openly gay footballer Justin Fashanu. The Justin Fashanu All-stars is open to both homosexual and heterosexual players. Team members also created initiative and campaign the Justin Campaign (co-founders included artist Jason B. Hall and Juliet Jacques) that got recognized by both the Prime minister and the FA, later transformed into a more international 'Football v Homophobia' campaign. In February 2014, it was revealed that only 11 of the Premier League's 20 teams, and only 17 of the Football League's 72 teams, had joined the 'Football v Homophobia' campaign.

In 2011 the Belfast Telegraph reported the formation of the Belfast Braves, who claimed to be the first lesbian football team in the UK.

TRUK United F.C. is a football club for transgender people. Lucy Clark founded the club in January 2021 after she found that transgender people were contacting her wishing to play football. The club launched a transfeminine team in 2022 and a transmasculine and non-binary team in 2023, the world's first.

In March 2025, footballer Helen Hardy created Manchester Laces, a community that aims to provide an inclusive environment for women and non-binary people who want to play football.

== List of LGBTQ footballers ==
=== Men ===
| Name | Nationality | Career | Date of coming out | Notes & references |
|---|---|---|---|---|
| Justin Fashanu | England | 1978–1997 | 1990 | The first English professional footballer to come out as homosexual. |
| Liam Davis | England | 2004–2019 | 2009 | |
| Aslie Pitter | England | ? | ? | |
| Robbie Rogers | United States | 2005–2017 | 2013 | |
| Thomas Hitzlsperger | Germany | 2001–2013 | 2014 | First openly gay player to have played in the Premier League. |
| Thomas Beattie | England | 2008–2015 | 2020 | |
| Jake Daniels | England | 2022– | 2022 | The second English professional footballer to come out as homosexual. |

=== Women ===
| Name | Nationality | Career | Date of coming out | Notes & references |
|---|---|---|---|---|
| Lily Parr | England | 1919–1951 | ? | |
| Hope Powell | England | 1978–1998 | ? | Managed the England women's team. |
| Megan Harris | England | ? | ? | Lincoln FC player. Partner of Casey Stoney. |
| Lianne Sanderson | England | 1997– | 2010 | England international |
| Casey Stoney | England | 1994– | 2014 | Captain of Team GB at the 2012 Olympics |
| Kelly Smith | England | 1994–2017 | ? | England international |
| Fara Williams | England | 2001–2021 | ? | England international |
| Fran Kirby | England | 2001– | ? | England international |
| Jodie Taylor | England | 2002– | ? | England international |
| Karen Bardsley | England | 2002– | ? | England international |
| Jill Scott | England | 2004– | ? | England international |
| Jess Carter | England | 2004– | ? | England international |
| Demi Stokes | England | 2007– | ? | England international |
| Lucy Staniforth | England | 2007– | ? | England international |
| Rachel Daly | England | 2008– | ? | England international |
| Beth Mead | England | 2010– | ? | England international |
| Bethany England | England | 2011– | ? | England international. Partner of Stephanie Williams. |
| Leah Williamson | England | 2014– | ? | Captain of England international team. |
| Keira Walsh | England | 2014– | ? | England international. |

== See also ==
- LGBTQ people in association football
- Gay Football Supporters Network
- International Gay and Lesbian Football Association
