= Attleborough =

Town in Norfolk, England

Coordinates: 52.52°N 1.02°E

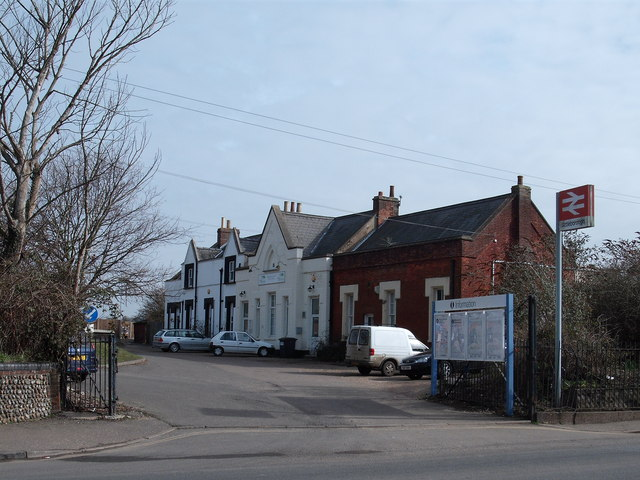
- Attleborough railway station

- Location within Norfolk
- Area: 21.9 km^{2} (8.5 sq mi)
- Population: 10,482 (2011 Census)
  - Density: 479/km^{2} (1,240/sq mi)
- OS grid reference: TM049954
- Civil parish: Attleborough
- District: Breckland
- Shire county: Norfolk
- Region: East
- Country: England
- Sovereign state: United Kingdom
- Post town: Attleborough
- Postcode district: NR17
- Dialling code: 01953
- Police: Norfolk
- Fire: Norfolk
- Ambulance: East of England
- UK Parliament: Mid Norfolk
- Website: Attleborough Town Council

Attleborough is a market town and civil parish located on the A11 road between Norwich and Thetford in Norfolk, England. The parish is in the district of Breckland and has an area of 21.9 square kilometres (8.5 sq mi).

The 2001 Census recorded the town as having a population of 9,702 distributed between 4,185 households, increasing to a population of 10,482 in 4,481 households in the 2011 Census. In 2021 the population was 11,232

Attleborough is in the Mid-Norfolk constituency of the UK Parliament, represented since the 2010 general election by the Conservative MP George Freeman.

Attleborough railway station provides a main line rail service to both Norwich and Cambridge.

== History ==
The Anglo-Saxon foundation of the settlement is unrecorded. A popular theory of the town's origin makes it a foundation of an Atlinge, and certainly burgh (or burh) indicates that it was fortified at an early date. According to the mid-12th century hagiographer of Saint Edmund, Geoffrey of Wells, Athla was the founder of the Ancient and royal town of Attleborough in Norfolk. In the Domesday Book of 1086 it is referred to as Attleburc.

After the Danes swept across Norfolk and seized Thetford, it is believed that the Saxons rallied their forces at Attleborough and probably threw up some form of protection. Although the Saxons put up a vigorous resistance, they eventually capitulated to the Danes and during the time of Edward the Confessor, powerful Danish families like Toradre and Turkill controlled local manors. If local records are correct, nothing but disaster was brought to Attleborough by the Danes, and it took the coming of William the Conqueror to restore some sense of well-being to the area.

Turkill relinquished his hold on the area to the Mortimer family towards the end of William's reign, and they governed Attleborough for more than three centuries. In the 14th century the Mortimer family founded the Chapel of the Holy Cross (being the south transept of Attleborough Church), about a century later, a Sir Robert de Mortimer founded the College of the Holy Cross, and later was added the nave and aisles, to accommodate the congregation.

Following Henry VIII's Dissolution of the Monasteries the building was virtually destroyed by Robert Radcliffe, Lord Fitz Walter, Earl of Sussex, and material from the building was used for making up the road between Attleborough and Old Buckenham. However, this left Attleborough Church with a tower at the east end.

A great part of the town was destroyed by fire in 1559. It was during that period that the Griffin Hotel was built, and it was in the cellars of the Griffin that prisoners on their way to the March Assizes in Thetford were confined overnight, tethered by chains to rings in the wall.

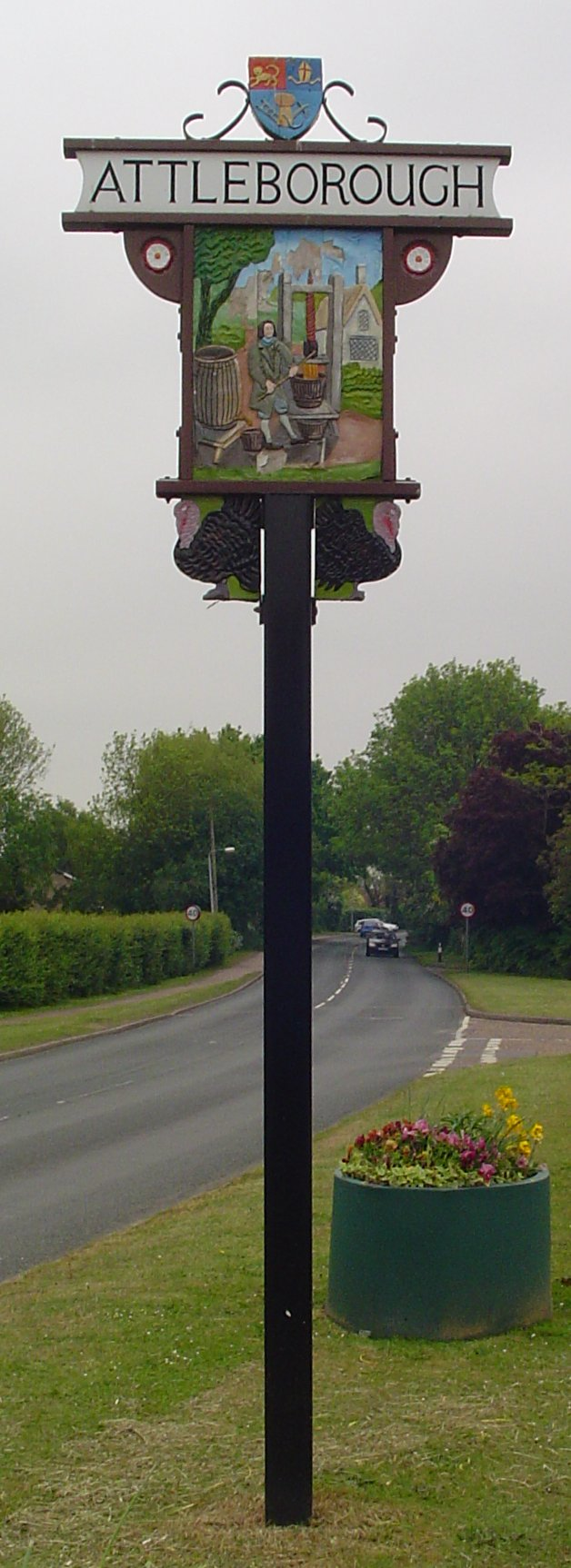
Village sign in Attleborough

The arrival of the prisoners aroused a great deal of public interest, and eventually traders set up a fair whenever they came. This became known as Attleborough Rogues Fair and was held on the market place on the last Thursday in March. Also on the market place festivities took place on Midsummer Day, when the annual guild was held. It appears that there has been the right to hold a weekly Thursday market in the town since 1285. A weekly market is still held and in 2004 returned to Queen's Square where it is presumed the market was originally held.

The first turnpike road in England is reputed to have been created here at the end of the 17th century, Acts of Parliament were passed in 1696 and 1709, "For the repairing of the highway between Wymondham and Attleborough, in the County of Norfolk, and for including therein the road from Wymondham to Hethersett".

The first national census of 1801 listed the population of Attleborough as 1,333. By 1845 Attleborough certainly dominated the surrounding parishes with a population of nearly 2,000, and in that year the railway (Norwich to Brandon) arrived.

The town supported six hostelries: The Griffin – the oldest, the Angel, the Bear, the Cock, the Crown and the White Horse. The Griffin, the Bear and the Cock still operate but the Crown is now a youth centre and the Angel is a building society branch office. Nothing is known of the fate of the White Horse after 1904, although the White Horse building still exists as a private house. There are currently two more public houses: The London Tavern and the Mulberry Tree, which is also a restaurant. At the centre of the town is Queens Square, at one time referred to as Market Hill.

In 1863 a corn exchange was built in the High Street owned by a company of local farmers and in 1896 the Gaymer's cider-making plant was built on the south side of the railway and soon became established as the largest employer in the town. The factory has now closed for cider-making, which has moved to Shepton Mallet in Somerset, but it has since re-opened as a chicken processing plant, and the corn exchange is now a local Indian restaurant.

The First World War affected Attleborough probably for no better or worse than many similar small towns. Five hundred and fifty men joined the armed forces and 96 did not return.

The 1920s saw continuing growth as a market centre, held on a Thursday, the stalls spread along the pavements of Church Street and in an open area by the Angel Hotel opposite the Griffin Inn. It was the turkey sales which made the town a thriving market centre in the 1930s, and thousands were sold each year on Michaelmas Day. Local employment still largely revolved round Gaymer's cider works.

Well into the '30s lighting was by oil lamps, then came the building of the gas works in Queens Road (since demolished, although the Gas Keeper's House is still there). Gradually gas was piped into homes, but it was a slow process.

In the early 1930s the Corn Hall was sold and became a cinema, reaching its heyday in the early '40s.

During 1939 the old post office was sold and it became the Doric Restaurant in Queens Square. It is now the town hall. The new post office was built in Exchange Street.

There were two local airfields during the Second World War, one at Deopham Green (Station 142) and one at Old Buckenham (Station 144).

Structurally the town changed little during the 1950s and there were no great leaps in population growth, other than the arrival of the notorious London gangsters, the Kray twins, who took over a local hostelry. The 1960s were different, the overspill programme and new town development brought new families into south Norfolk. Attleborough had to make decisions for the future and new development zones were designated.

The first estate programme began with the building of the council-owned Cyprus Estate, which has since been complemented by other private housing schemes such as Fairfields and Ollands built mainly in the 1970s, and a large estate on the south side of the town in the 1990s. The traditional traffic route along the A11 trunk road became a bottleneck as it ran both ways along High Street and Church Street, thus in the 1970s a one-way system was opened channelling traffic around the natural ring road surrounding the church. The volume of traffic continued to increase making that change obsolete so the Attleborough bypass was opened in 1984. The bypass was widened and completed in 2007, removing the only single-lane section of the A11 between Thetford and Norwich.

== Churches ==
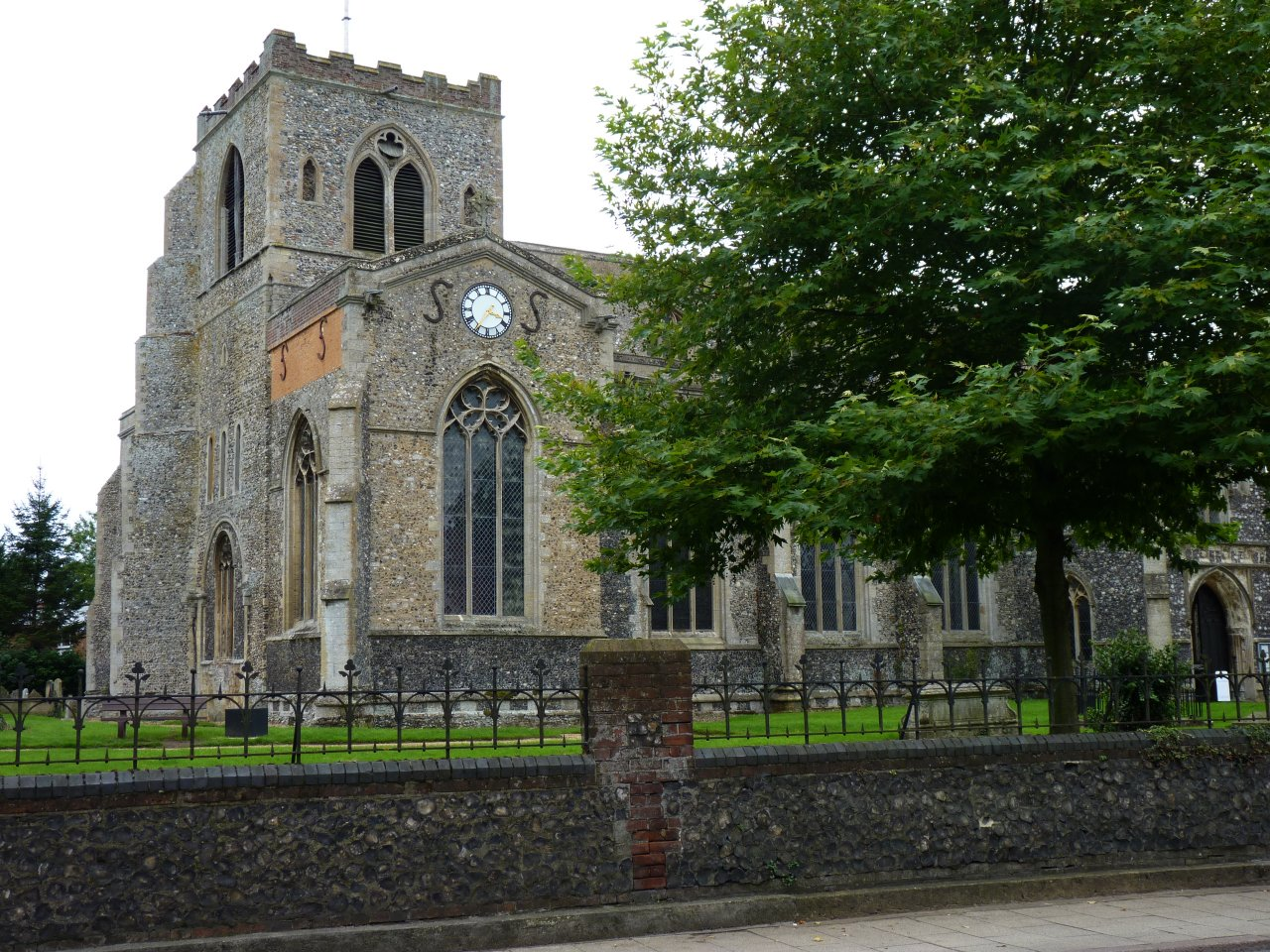
Attleborough parish church

The parish church of the Assumption of the Blessed Virgin Mary is partly Norman and partly 14th century. The east end of the church is Norman and the nave is late 14th century. In 1368 the College of Holy Cross was founded in the Norman part and at that time the nave was built for the use of the parish. The remarkable rood screen has the loft intact for its full width but has been often restored. It is one of the finest rood screens in Norfolk and above are frescoes of ca. 1500, since much-mutilated.

The Eastern Baptist Association meets at the Baptist church in Leys Lane. The Attleborough Methodist church in London Road has stopped holding normal services but still provides rooms to hire for community use. This building was designed by the architect Augustus Scott in Gothic Revival style, and in 1913 replaced the Primitive Methodist building in Chapel Road, since demolished.

== Education ==
There are three schools in the town: Attleborough Academy, Rosecroft Primary School on London Road and Attleborough Primary School on Besthorpe Road. Wymondham College, a large state boarding school, is located just outside of the town.

== Industry ==
Banham Poultry is based in Attleborough. British F4 team Virtuosi Racing and 2024 FIA Formula 2 Team Champion Invicta Racing are based in Attleborough.

== Notable people ==
- The composer Malcolm Arnold lived in the town from the late 1980s until his death in September 2006.
- Brothers and professional footballers John and Justin Fashanu lived in and went to school in Attleborough.
- The racing driver Ayrton Senna (1960–1994) lived in Attleborough during his early years in international motorsport through to his time in Formula One.
- Brandon Francis, (born) Justin Christopher Davis, actor and writer. Lived in and went to school in Attleborough.
- Radoslav Rochallyi, resident in Attleborough in 2001, where he wrote texts for his mathematical poetry.
