= Banham (surname) =

Banham is a surname. Notable people with the surname include:

- Bob Banham (1912–1999), Australian rugby league footballer and coach
- Cliff Banham (fl. 1952), New Zealand footballer
- Frank Banham (born 1975), Canadian-Hungarian ice hockey player
- John Banham (1940–2022), British businessman
- Katharine Banham (1897–1995), English developmental psychologist
- Rachel Banham (born 1993), American basketball player
- Reyner Banham (1922–1988), English architectural critic
- Russ Banham (born 1954), American writer, reporter, and journalist
- Stanley Banham (1913–1984), English cricketer
- Stephen Banham (born 1968), Australian typographer
- Teresa Banham (born 1964), British television and theatre actress
- Tony Banham (born 1959), English historian
