= Jake Daniels =

English footballer (born 2005)

Personal information
- Date of birth: 8 January 2005 (age 21)
- Place of birth: Bispham, England
- Position: Forward

Youth career
- 2012–2022: Blackpool

Senior career*
Years	Team	Apps	(Gls)
2022–2025	Blackpool	1	(0)
2022	→ Bamber Bridge (loan)	5	(1)
2024	→ Bradford Park Avenue (loan)	12	(4)
2024–2025	→ Warrington Rylands 1906 (loan)	33	(5)
- * Club domestic league appearances and goals as of 00:39, 2 December 2025 (UTC)

Jake Daniels (born 8 January 2005) is an English professional footballer who plays as a forward. He became a free agent when his contract with Blackpool expired on 30 June 2025.

== Club career ==
A youth product of Blackpool since the age of seven, Daniels began playing with their U18s in 2021 and was named Blackpool's youth team player of the season for 2020–21, scoring 30 goals for the U18s.

He signed his first professional contract with the club on 25 February 2022, and joined Northern Premier League side Bamber Bridge on loan on 26 March for the remainder of the 2021–22 season. Daniels was sent off on his debut for Bamber Bridge in a 1–0 win against Basford United; he made five appearances in his loan spell, scoring once in a 4–0 win away win at Hyde United.

Daniels made his debut for the Blackpool senior side in a 5–0 EFL Championship loss to Peterborough United on 7 May, coming on as an 81st-minute substitute.

On 3 February 2024, Daniels joined Bradford Park Avenue on loan. He made 12 league appearances for Park Avenue, scoring four times.

On 20 September 2024, he joined Warrington Rylands 1906 on a month-long loan. On 26 October 2024, he scored a goal in a 4–0 win against Ossett United in the first round of the FA Trophy, and was named man of the match. On 18 February 2025, he scored both goals in Warrington's 2–0 victory over Leek Town in the Northern Premier League; he was named man of the match.

== Personal life ==
In May 2022 Daniels came out as gay, aged seventeen, becoming the UK's only male professional footballer to be publicly out at the time, and the first since Justin Fashanu in 1990. He cited fellow footballer Josh Cavallo, Thetford Town manager Matt Morton, and diver Tom Daley as helping him come out. His decision to come out was praised by the then British Prime Minister Boris Johnson, Football Association president Prince William and England captain Harry Kane.

On 29 June, he was shortlisted in the Celebrity of the Year category for the 2022 National Diversity Awards for the "courageous decision" he made the previous month; he also won the Gamechanger Award at the 2023 Virgin Atlantic Attitude Awards, hosted by British gay magazine Attitude.

On 28 October 2024, Sky Sports premiered a short documentary film directed and produced by Michael Gunning called Beneath the Surface about Jake Daniels.

== See also ==
- Homosexuality in modern sports
- Homosexuality in English football
