= Justin Fashanu =

English footballer (1961–1998)

Personal information
- Full name: Justinus Soni Fashanu
- Date of birth: 19 February 1961
- Place of birth: Hackney, London, England
- Date of death: 2 May 1998 (aged 37)
- Place of death: Shoreditch, London, England
- Height: 6 ft 1 in (1.85 m)
- Position: Forward

Youth career
- Norwich City

Senior career*
Years	Team	Apps	(Gls)
1978–1981	Norwich City	90	(35)
1980	→ Adelaide City (loan)	5	(3)
1981	→ Adelaide City (loan)	6	(2)
1981–1982	Nottingham Forest	32	(3)
1982	→ Southampton (loan)	9	(3)
1982–1985	Notts County	64	(20)
1985–1987	Brighton & Hove Albion	16	(2)
1988	Los Angeles Heat	12	(5)
1988–1989	Edmonton Brick Men	35	(22)
1989	Manchester City	2	(0)
1989–1990	West Ham United	2	(0)
1990	Leyton Orient	5	(0)
1990–1991	Hamilton Steelers	29	(10)
1991	Southall	6	(1)
1991	Toronto Blizzard	10	(3)
1991	Leatherhead		
1991	Newcastle United	0	(0)
1991–1993	Torquay United	41	(15)
1993	Airdrieonians	16	(5)
1993	Trelleborg	1	(0)
1993–1994	Heart of Midlothian	11	(1)
1995–1997	Atlanta Ruckus	7	(1)
1997	Miramar Rangers	18	(12)
Total		417	(133)

International career
1979	England Youth	2	(0)
1979	England B	1	
1980–1982	England U21	11	(5)
- * Club domestic league appearances and goals

Justinus Soni "Justin" Fashanu (/ˈfæʃənuː/ FASH-ə-noo; 19 February 1961 – 2 May 1998) was an English footballer who played for a variety of clubs between 1978 and 1997. He was known by his early clubs to be gay, and came out publicly later in his career, becoming the first professional footballer to be openly gay. He was also one of the first footballers to command a £1 million transfer fee, with his transfer from Norwich City to Nottingham Forest in 1981, and had varying levels of success as a player afterwards, until he retired in 1997.

After moving to the United States, in 1998 he was questioned by police when a seventeen-year-old boy accused him of sexual assault. He was charged, and a warrant for his arrest was issued in Howard County, Maryland, on 3 April 1998, but he had already left his flat. According to his suicide note, fearing he would not get a fair trial because of his homosexuality, he fled to England, where he killed himself in London in May 1998. His suicide note stated that the sex was consensual. In 2020, Fashanu was inducted into the National Football Museum Hall of Fame.

== Early life ==
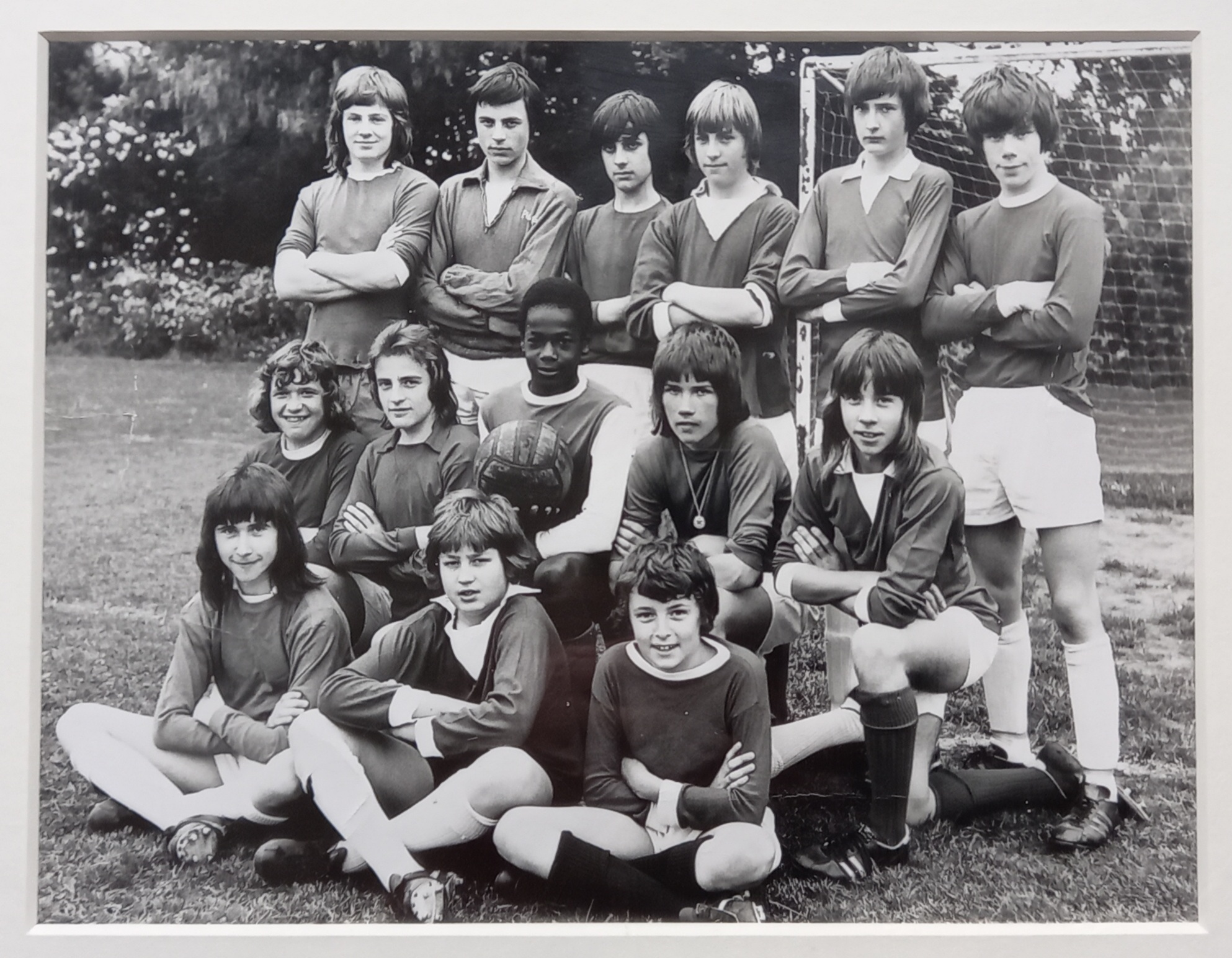
Justin Fashanu with his school football team from Attleborough High School in 1974

Fashanu was the son of a Nigerian barrister living in the UK and a Guyanese nurse named Pearl. When his parents split up, he and his younger brother John were sent to a Barnardo's care home. When he was six, he and John were fostered by Alf and Betty Jackson and were brought up in Shropham, Norfolk.

Fashanu excelled at boxing as a youth, and was rumoured at one time to be pursuing a professional boxing career instead of his footballing career. Fashanu attended Attleborough High School in the 1970s where his talent for football developed, and was spotted by Norwich City Football Club scout John Sainty in a school match against Thetford Grammar School in 1974.

== Football career ==
Fashanu began his career as an apprentice with Norwich City, turning professional in December 1978. He made his league debut on 13 January 1979, against West Bromwich Albion, and settled into the Norwich side, scoring regularly and occasionally spectacularly. In 1980, he won the BBC Goal of the Season award, for a spectacular goal against Liverpool. He managed a total of 103 senior appearances for Norwich, scoring 40 goals. While at the club he was also capped six times for England at under-21 level, although an anticipated call-up to the senior side never materialised. He scored 19 league goals in the 1980–81 season, but it was not enough to prevent the Canaries from being relegated. Fashanu's name had been linked with bigger clubs for some time, and his inevitable departure from Carrow Road came in August 1981 when he signed for Nottingham Forest, becoming Britain's first £1 million black footballer.

His career stalled as his professional relationship with manager Brian Clough deteriorated; Clough, it would appear, was disturbed by the rumours of Fashanu's visits to gay nightclubs and bars. His goals and then confidence dried up as he failed to fit in with the playing and lifestyle demands of Clough, especially after Clough had discovered his homosexuality and barred him from training with the side. He scored just three goals in 32 league games for Forest in 1981–82.

In his autobiography, Clough recounts a verbal dressing-down he gave Fashanu after hearing rumours that he was going to gay bars. "'Where do you go if you want a loaf of bread?' I asked him. 'A baker's, I suppose.' 'Where do you go if you want a leg of lamb?' 'A butcher's.' 'So why do you keep going to that bloody poofs' club?'"

In August 1982, he was loaned to Southampton, scoring three goals in nine appearances. At The Dell, Fashanu settled in well and his promising form helped the "Saints" overcome the sudden departure of Kevin Keegan; manager Lawrie McMenemy would have liked to make the move permanent, but was prevented from doing so by a lack of funds.

In December 1982, he was sold to Forest's local rivals Notts County for £150,000. He scored 20 times in 64 games for the Magpies, although he was unable to prevent them suffering back-to-back relegations, before moving to Brighton & Hove Albion in June 1985 for a fee of £115,000, where a knee injury soon afterwards looked to have finished his career. He went to the United States for surgery and began playing again, firstly with Los Angeles Heat and then to Canada with the Edmonton Brick Men and with the Hamilton Steelers.

He returned to England in 1989 and tried to resurrect his top level playing career, joining Manchester City on 23 October 1989, and played twice in the First Division, but on 20 November, barely a month after joining the club, he moved to West Ham United, later having a trial with Ipswich Town. He joined Leyton Orient in March 1990 and subsequently joined non-league Southall as player-coach, before spending the summer of 1991 back in North America with Toronto Blizzard. After leaving Toronto, he returned to England again to sign for semi-pro team Leatherhead.

In October 1990, he publicly came out as gay in an interview with the tabloid press, becoming the only prominent player in professional English football to do so until Jake Daniels in 2022. Although Fashanu claimed that he was generally well accepted by his fellow players, he freely admitted that they would often joke maliciously about his sexual orientation, and he also became the target of constant crowd abuse because of it.

He began a trial with Newcastle United on 24 October 1991, making one first-team appearance as a sub against Peterborough United. Manager Ossie Ardiles decided not to give him a permanent contract. He signed for Torquay United in the Third Division on 23 November 1991. He was the centre of fan and media attention while at Plainmoor: in particular, his relationship with Coronation Street actress Julie Goodyear featured in tabloid newspapers; but he still managed to impress on the pitch, playing 21 league games that season and scoring 10 goals, though he was unable to save Torquay from suffering relegation from the Third Division.

When Ivan Golac was appointed the manager of Torquay in February 1992, Fashanu was given the role of assistant manager and maintained this position at the end of the season when Golac was replaced by new manager Paul Compton.

On 13 April 1992, Fashanu received a £265 fine and a 28-day driving ban after being found guilty of speeding and failing to produce his driving licence.

In February 1993, with Torquay battling against a second successive relegation, from the new Division Three to the Football Conference, Fashanu applied for the vacant post of manager following Compton's departure, but was turned down in favour of Neil Warnock. Fashanu left Torquay, having scored 15 goals in 41 games for the Gulls. He went on to play for Airdrieonians soon after but was unable to save them from suffering relegation from the Scottish Premier Division. By this point, national Scottish newspaper The Herald said: "Fashanu has had more clubs than Arnold Palmer."

He left Airdrieonians in 1993, playing in Sweden with Trelleborg, before returning to Scotland, joining Heart of Midlothian in July 1993. Fashanu made his Jam Tarts debut, playing 66 minutes before being substituted, in a 2–1 loss against Rangers in the opening game of the season. He provided a goal for John Robertson in a famous 2–1 win against Atlético Madrid in the first leg of the UEFA Cup first round. However, Hearts was eliminated from the tournament after the opposition team overturned a 3–0 lead in the return leg. But Fashanu then had his contract terminated in February 1994 for "unprofessional conduct" (he had attempted to sell false stories regarding him and a number of cabinet ministers to the press), and returned to the United States to coach youth football in Georgia. He later moved to Atlanta Ruckus but was suspended for the playoffs for failure to comply with the terms of his contract, before joining Miramar Rangers in New Zealand in 1997. He then moved to Ellicott City, Maryland, to coach the Maryland Mania, a new professional team in the second division USL A-League, following his officially announced retirement from the professional game.

== Coming out in the press ==
Fashanu agreed to an exclusive with The Sun tabloid newspaper to come out as gay. They ran the headline as "£1m Soccer Star: I AM GAY" on 22 October 1990. He claimed to have had an affair with a married Conservative MP, whom he first met in a London gay bar. "We ended up in bed together at his London flat", he said. A week later, his brother John Fashanu agreed to an exclusive with The Voice under the headline "John Fashanu: My Gay Brother is an Outcast." Justin Fashanu was interviewed for the July 1991 cover story of Gay Times, where the situation was summarised as:

The Sun dragged out the tale with titillating stories of sexual encounters with unnamed MPs, football players and pop stars, which, he claims, were largely untrue. The revelations, nevertheless, earned him a considerable sum of money but he says he was offered even more by others who wanted him to stay in the closet. He admits that he wasn't fully prepared for the backlash that followed and his career in football ... has suffered "heavy damage". Although he's fully fit, no club has offered him a full-time contract since the story first appeared.

In 1992, he agreed to front Loud'n'proud, a new national radio series aimed at young lesbians and gay men, but the pilot with Fashanu presenting was turned down by BBC Radio 5; it was later commissioned, with a female presenter, for BBC Radio 1.

Fashanu was the subject of an early internet meme in 1996 when the BBC opened their poll for the Sports Personality of the Year award to e-mail votes for the first time. An online campaign was organised among students in an attempt to enable him to win the title, but his votes were excluded from the final tally by the show's production team.

== Allegation and suicide ==
In March 1998, a seventeen-year-old stated to police that he had been sexually assaulted by Fashanu after a night of drinking. Homosexual acts were illegal in the US state of Maryland at the time, and the youth stated the act was not consensual but being performed as he awoke. The assault was alleged to have taken place in Fashanu's apartment in Ellicott City, Maryland. Fashanu was questioned about this by the police on 3 April, but he was not held in custody. The police later arrived at his flat with a warrant to arrest him on charges of second-degree sexual assault, first-degree assault, and second-degree assault, but Fashanu had already fled to England.

On the morning of 3 May, he was found hanged in a deserted lock-up garage he had broken into, in Fairchild Place, Shoreditch, London, at the age of 37, after visiting Chariots Roman Spa, a local gay sauna. In his suicide note, he denied the charges, stating that the sex was consensual, and that he had fled to England because he felt he could not get a fair trial due to his homosexuality, and he added: "I realised that I had already been presumed guilty. I do not want to give any more embarrassment to my friends and family." An inquest held in London on 9 September heard evidence from a Scotland Yard detective that the Americans made no request for Fashanu to be found or arrested, and the Coroner stated that he was not a wanted man at the time he hanged himself. The Times and the BBC reported that an arrest warrant had been issued by Howard County District Court on 3 April, that he had been charged with second-degree sexual assault and first-degree and second-degree assaults punishable by up to twenty years in jail, and that Howard County police would have requested his extradition had they known he had fled to England. The inquest recorded a verdict of suicide.

Fashanu's remains were cremated and a small ceremony was held at City of London Cemetery and Crematorium.

John Fashanu later expressed regret for some of the comments he made when his brother came out. In an interview with talkSPORT in 2012, John Fashanu claimed his brother was not gay and was merely an "attention seeker".

== Legacy ==
Fashanu was listed at number 99 in the Top 500 Lesbian and Gay Heroes in The Pink Paper.

In March 2009, a football team, The Justin Fashanu All-stars, was named at a special event in Brighton, supported by the FA. The team, named in his honour, was created by the Justin Campaign, which is a campaign against homophobia in football and promotes the inclusion of openly gay players in football.

In 2017, Netflix released the film, Forbidden Games: The Justin Fashanu Story.

In 2023, a large mural of Fashanu was painted onto the wall of a pub, the Fat Cat and Canary, in Norwich, replacing a mural of former Norwich manager, Daniel Farke.

== See also ==
- Homosexuality in English football
- Josh Cavallo, the first professional Australian player to come out (in 2021), with wide support
- List of suicides of LGBTQ people
