= Gay bathhouses in the United Kingdom =

Places for public gay sex

Gay bathhouses in the United Kingdom are referred to as "gay saunas", as opposed to gay bathhouses, the term more commonly used in North America. There are gay saunas throughout the UK in most major cities, including seven in London.

== Gay saunas ==
=== Current ===
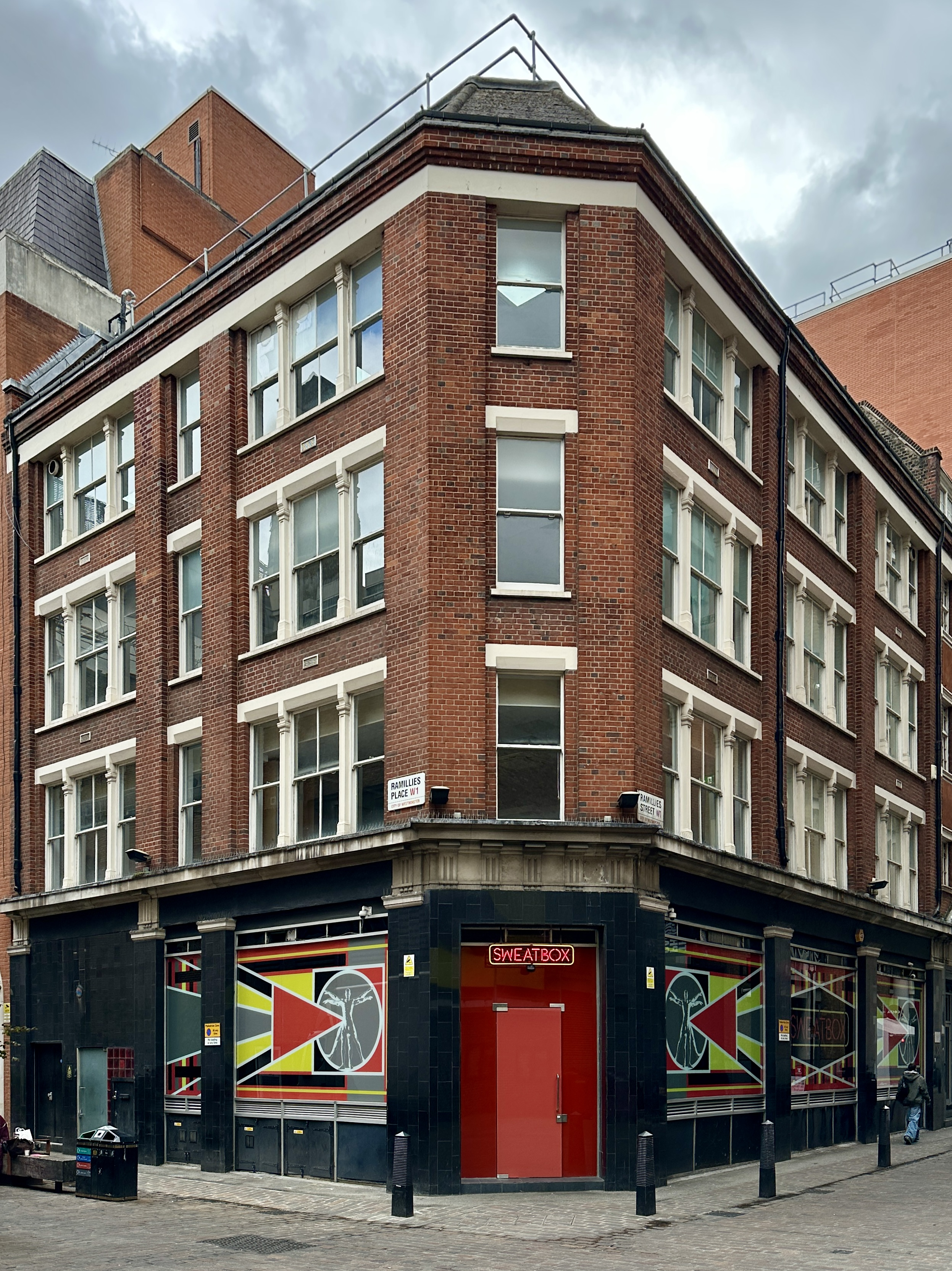
SweatBox Soho, London

Gay saunas in the UK:

- Acqua Sauna, Blackpool, Lancashire
- Basement Complex, Manchester
- ClubZeus Sauna Mansfield, Nottinghamshire
- ClubZeus Sauna Sheffield
- Covent Garden Health Spa (formerly The Stable and Saunabar), London
- Dolphin Sauna, New Brighton, Merseyside
- E15 Club, Stratford, London
- Gentry Spa, Kingston upon Hull, East Yorkshire
- Heroes Health Club, Stourbridge, West Midlands
- Just For You, Birmingham
- Manticore Spa, Plymouth, Devon
- Marco's Health Spa, Kingston upon Hull, East Yorkshire
- ME1 Sauna, Rochester, Kent
- Nero's Sauna, Bury, Greater Manchester
- Number 52, Newcastle upon Tyne
- Outside Sauna, Belfast
- Pennine Sauna, Oldham, Greater Manchester
- Plastic Ivy Sauna, Dewsbury, West Yorkshire
- Pleasuredrome, London
- Portsea Sauna, London
- Sailors Sauna (formerly Chariots), Limehouse, London
- Sauna Sauna Northwich, Northwich, Cheshire
- Saunabar, Bournemouth
- Splash Spa & Leisure, Leicester
- Steam Complex, Armley, Leeds
- Steamer Quay, Torquay
- Steamworks Sauna (formerly The Pound), Edinburgh
- Sweat, Carlisle
- Sweatbox Sauna, London
- The Boiler Room Sauna, Brighton
- The Brighton Sauna, Brighton
- The Greenhouse, Luton, Bedfordshire
- The Greenhouse, Darlaston, West Midlands
- The Greenhouse, Newport, Gwent
- The Locker Room, Kennington, London
- The Pipeworks, Glasgow
- The Pipeworks, Leeds
- Touch Sauna, Swindon, Wiltshire
- Tropics Day Spa, Portsmouth
- W3 Sauna, Blackpool (formerly WetWetWet), Lancashire

=== Closed ===
Former (now closed) gay saunas in the UK:

- Base Sauna (H_{2}O), Manchester
- Base, Newcastle
- Base, Leeds
- Bright 'N' Beautiful Sauna, Brighton
- Celts Sauna, Leicester
- Chariots Farringdon, London
- Chariots Shoreditch, London
- Chariots Streatham, London
- Chariots Vauxhall, London
- Chariots Waterloo, London
- The Cage, Derry
- Club 69, Kingston upon Hull, East Yorkshire
- Club Kudos, Dundee
- CS1, Derby
- CS2, Nottingham
- Eagle 50, Cardiff
- Gator Sauna, Exeter, Devon
- Heat Sauna, Stockport, Greater Manchester
- Helsinki Health Spa, Ipswich, Suffolk
- Jack's Hydro, Bangor
- Legs 800 Club, Walthamstow, London
- Lindum Sauna, Bradford, West Yorkshire
- Men's Micro Sauna (formerly Sauna 61 / Alpha Sauna), Maidstone, Kent
- Number 18, Edinburgh
- Pink Broadway, Southampton, Hampshire
- Sparta (formerly Lads Locker Room), Bristol
- Spartan, Erdington, Birmingham
- Splash Sauna, Liverpool, Merseyside
- Star Steam, Battersea, London
- Steamworks, New Cross, London
- Suite.429, Chelmsford, Essex
- The Bathhouse (formerly The Suite), Bath
- The Boiler Room, Sheffield
- The Frat House, Sheffield
- The Greenhouse, Barnsley
- The Lane, Glasgow
- The Pound, Edinburgh
- Unit 1 Sauna, Rottingdean, East Sussex
- Unit 2 Sauna, Birmingham
- Wellman's Health Studio, Aberdeen
- Wolf Spa, Nottingham

== Chariots ==
Chariots Leisure Ltd at one point operated six gay saunas in London; as of 2020, all are closed, with another open under a different name. These venues were:

- Chariots Shoreditch (opened 1996, closed 2016)
- Chariots Farringdon (opened 1999, closed 2010 due to the Crossrail development).
- Chariots Streatham (opened 1999, closed 2016)
- Chariots Limehouse (2002, previously Sailors Sauna, since c.2013 Sailors Sauna again)
- Chariots Waterloo (opened 2003, previously Wellingtons Health Club, closed 2018)
- Chariots Vauxhall (2005, closed March 2020). In January 2021 Chariots Spa announced that it had gone into liquidation and that Chariots Vauxhall was permanently closed.

In terms of floor-space and capacity, Chariots Shoreditch was the largest gay sauna in the UK.

=== Description ===
Chariots Shoreditch was on three floors, decorated in the style of Roman baths.

On the ground floor was the main entrance with several areas of customer lockers, main shower room, TV lounge with bar/cafe, vending machines, internet area and an inclusive gym with several work-out machines.

The first floor housed a maze of free private cabins of various sizes including orgy rooms and an extensive dark maze (pitch black orgy room and set of cabins).

The second floor had a swimming pool, poolside loungers, two whirlpools (Jacuzzis), two steam-rooms, two hot dry saunas, showers, glory-hole cubicles, a second smaller dark room, outside private smoking area and a porn video/orgy room.

There were free STD testing sessions held at the bathhouse.

Chariots Roman Spa opened in 1997. The management previously ran Rio's, a Kentish Town naturist spa. Originally a warehouse, the Shoreditch redevelopment cost £2.5 million. In 2000 the venue was significantly expanded with the addition of the restaurant, 30 more cubicles, video lounge and internet room. It was announced in February 2016 that the venue would be closing down, and the building would be demolished for a redevelopment of the site.

Chariots Waterloo was on one level on the first floor of the building. It comprised an entrance lobby, locker room, cafe, showers, a steam room, a large sauna later divided in two, dark rooms, glory holes, private rooms and relaxation area.

=== Etiquette ===
Customers were given two towels, a locker key and condoms on entrance. Further condoms were available from wall dispensers. Most people kept the second towel as a dry spare in their locker. The convention was to walk around the bathhouse wearing a towel, though nudity in the dry or steam sauna was normal. Apart from the lounge, cafe area, lockable cabins and within the Jacuzzi, sexual activity occurred anywhere, with anyone free to watch or attempt to join in.

==== Media attention ====
On 2 May 1998, former footballer Justin Fashanu spent the evening in Chariots Shoreditch, before committing suicide nearby that night.

There was significant press interest and internet speculation in 2006 when Chariots Shoreditch was closed for Easter weekend, after a 24-year-old man's body was found. The police investigation found that the death was due to a drugs overdose, but there were no suspicious circumstances.

On Sunday 20 March 2011, the London Fire Brigade were called to attend a fire which was reported to have destroyed most of the ground floor of Chariots Shoreditch. 150 patrons were evacuated, and there were no injuries.

== Notable gay sauna buildings ==
=== Sauna Sauna Northwich ===
Sauna Sauna Northwich is a gay sauna and social venue located in Northwich, Cheshire, and is noted for operating within a building of historical industrial and scientific significance. It is regarded as one of the largest gay sauna venues in the United Kingdom.

=== History ===
The building occupied by Sauna Sauna Northwich predates its current use, and has a long association with Britain's chemical industry. It originally formed part of facilities connected to Brunner, Mond & Co., a chemical manufacturing company founded in 1873 that played a significant role in the development of the British alkali and chemical sectors.

From 1933, the site became associated with research activities at the Winnington Laboratories, operated by Imperial Chemical Industries (ICI) following the merger of several British chemical firms, including Brunner, Mond & Co. The laboratories were active throughout much of the 20th century, and were involved in a range of industrial research programmes. In the same year, chemists Reginald Gibson and Eric Fawcett made the accidental discovery of polyethylene at the Winnington Laboratories while conducting high pressure experiments involving ethylene. Although the initial result was difficult to reproduce, subsequent research led to reliable production methods, and polyethylene later became one of the most widely used plastics worldwide.
