= Banham Group =

Security company

- Industry: Locks, Home Security, Corporate security, CCTV, Burglar Alarms, Safes, Security systems, Padlocks, Access control, Door security
- Founded: 1926
- Founder: William F. Banham
- Headquarters: London, England
- Area served: Greater London, Southern England
- Website: www.banham.co.uk

Banham Group (formerly known as Banham Patent Locks) is a family owned security company. Established in 1926, Banham Group is now the largest supplier of burglary and fire prevention systems in London.

The company's history dates back to 1926, when William F. Banham invented the first automatic latch bolt lock after a series of burglaries on his wife's dress shop. He opened his own locksmith shop on Oxford Street, London, and offered £25 to anyone who could pick or break one of his patented locks.

Banham Group still offers the patented locks and security key registration system as well as other security products and services. Between the years 1968 and 1981, the company created an alarms division, an access control division and opened an Alarm Receiving Centre. Since then, they have received awards from the Metropolitan Police for their alarm systems, and certificates from Secured by Design, the official UK Police flagship initiative, for their locks, shutters, grilles and safes.

The company has a head office in Earlsfield, and showrooms in Kensington, Golders Green and Guildford .

Banham Group moved to its purpose-built headquarters in Earlsfield from their offices in Vauxhall in 2015.

== Companies in the Banham Group ==
- Aegis Alarm Systems
- Banham Patent Locks Ltd
- Banham Close Protection
- Bridger Alarms
- Capstan Security
- Close Link Security
- Banham Keyholding (Formerly CMS Keyholding)
- GSM Security Ltd
- Security 201
- Tara Burglar Alarms
- Tops Security
- Complete Security (Essex)

== Sources ==
- The Glasgow Herald (13 January 1931) p. 8
