= David Haigh =

Football executive

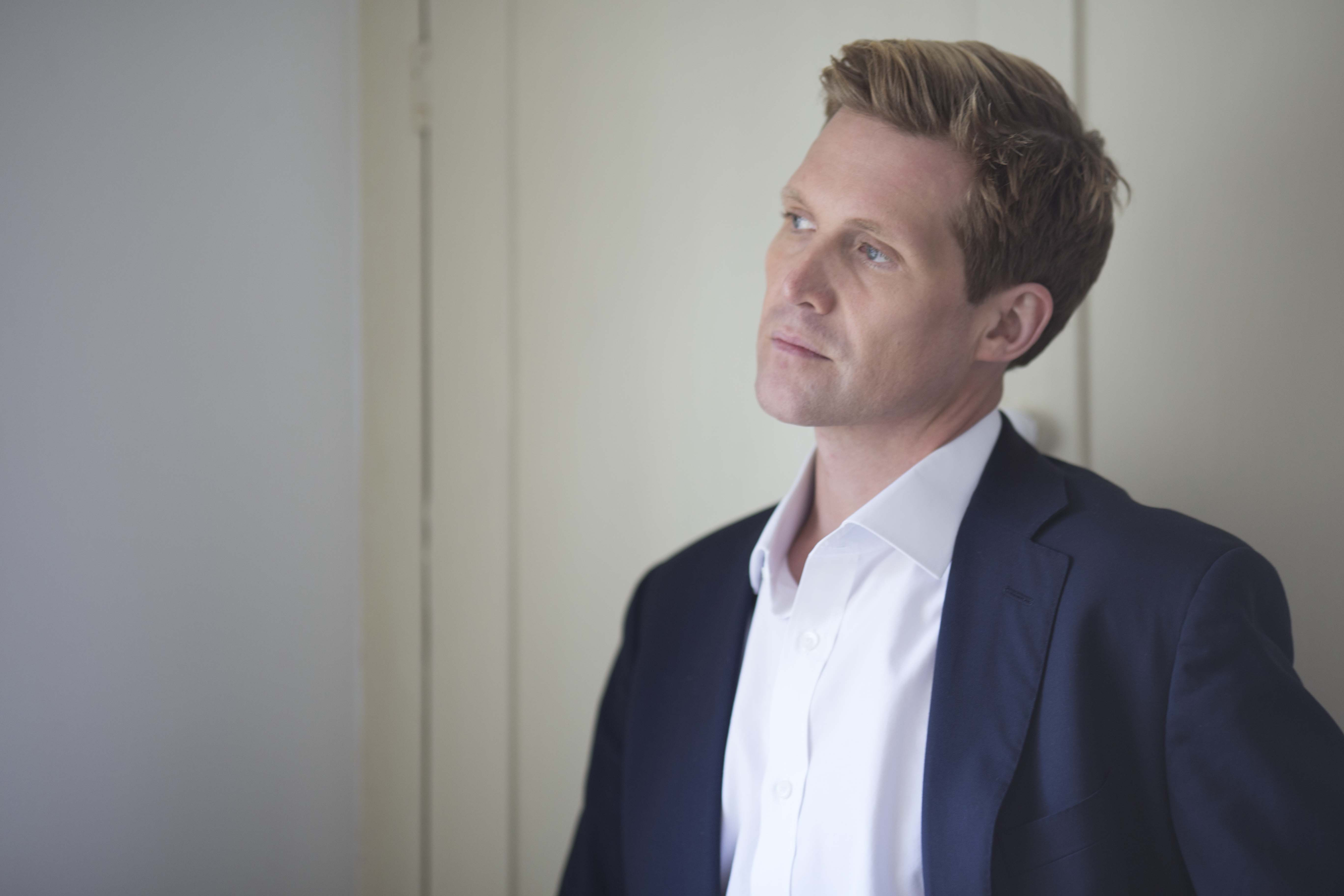
- Born: David Lawrence Haigh; Manchester, England
- Education: University of Southampton

David Lawrence Haigh is an English businessman and former football executive who was managing director of Leeds United Football Club from 2013 to 2014. He was the first openly gay managing director of an English football club.

In 2015, Haigh was convicted of breach of trust by a Dubai criminal court over the misappropriation of funds from his former employer, GFH Capital, and served 22 months in prison. In 2018, the Dubai International Financial Centre (DIFC) Courts ruled that he had fraudulently diverted company funds via false invoices; the English High Court and Court of Appeal subsequently enforced the ruling, and he was declared bankrupt in 2020.

Haigh states that he was tortured and raped while detained; in 2017, a Scottish sheriff in an extradition case accepted his account of his mistreatment. Since his release, he has worked as a self-described human rights lawyer and co-founded the advocacy group Detained International.

== Education ==
Haigh attended Cape Cornwall School, England. He then studied at the University of Southampton, where he graduated with a degree in law and attended law school at the College of Law in London.

== Career ==
Haigh is a solicitor of the Senior Courts of England and Wales but does not hold a practising certificate. Disciplinary proceedings brought against him by the Solicitors Regulation Authority in 2018, relating to his work for GFH Capital, were later stayed by the Solicitors Disciplinary Tribunal in 2023 on the grounds of ill health. He joined law firm Palmer Cowen (later Fairmays LLP) in 2001 and has worked at other law firms including DLA Piper and Akin Gump.

Haigh co-founded, with Radha Stirling, the firm Stirling Haigh, an international dispute resolution and crisis management advisory firm, of which he was managing partner.

He co-founded Detained International in 2018, a London-based legal advocacy NGO providing pro bono legal support to individuals alleging injustice and human rights violations in the United Arab Emirates and the wider Middle East.

Haigh was chairman of Conservatives Abroad UAE and vice-chairman of Gulf Tories.

=== Football ===
Haigh led GFH Capital’s negotiations with the then-owner of Leeds United Ken Bates for the acquisition of the club, announced in November 2012. He joined the Leeds United board in February 2013 and was made managing director on 1 July 2013. He resigned on 11 April 2014, following the purchase of the club by Massimo Cellino.

In November 2013, Haigh and Andre Flowers formed a consortium, Sport Capital, in an unsuccessful attempt to purchase a majority stake in the club from GFH Capital; Sport Capital subsequently brought a £33.5 million claim against GFH Capital.

== Legal proceedings in Dubai and England ==
=== Arrest and criminal conviction (2014–2016) ===
Haigh was arrested in Dubai in May 2014, a month after resigning as Leeds United managing director, over the alleged misappropriation of approximately AED 23.7 million (about US$6.5 million) from GFH Capital. Haigh said he had been lured to Dubai by GFH on the pretext of discussing a new role. In August 2015 he was convicted by the Dubai Criminal Court of breach of trust and sentenced to two years' imprisonment.

On the day of his scheduled release, GFH filed a further criminal complaint alleging Haigh had abused the company on Twitter while in jail; he was acquitted of that charge in March 2016 and returned to the UK, having served 22 months. Haigh has consistently denied the allegations, saying the case was fabricated to prevent him whistleblowing about GFH's own conduct.

=== DIFC civil proceedings (2014–2018) ===
GFH Capital brought parallel civil proceedings against Haigh in the Dubai International Financial Centre (DIFC) Courts. Following a four-day trial in July 2018, which Haigh did not attend, Sir Jeremy Cooke - a retired judge of the High Court of England and Wales - found that Haigh had used false invoices to divert GFH funds into his own and a friend's bank accounts, and ordered him to repay more than £3.8 million plus costs, dismissing his counterclaims. The judgment found the evidence showed Haigh procuring payments of the claimant's funds to himself, concealed by the creation of false invoices, and rejected his contention that the claims had been fabricated to stop him whistleblowing.

=== Proceedings in England (2020–2021) ===
Haigh sought to resist enforcement of the DIFC judgment in the High Court of England and Wales, arguing it had been procured by fraud. In May 2020, Mr Justice Henshaw ruled that Haigh could not establish a case that the claim against him was fictitious, quoting Sir Jeremy Cooke's observation that no coherent explanation had ever been offered for the large sums that reached Haigh's bank accounts via false invoices. Henshaw J found Haigh's non-participation in the enforcement hearing was his "deliberate choice", and a disclosure order carrying a penal notice was issued. The decision was the first English High Court enforcement of a DIFC Courts judgment.

Haigh was refused permission to appeal, with Lady Justice Carr finding the appeal had no real prospect of success and no arguable error of law or fact.

Haigh was declared bankrupt in August 2020, according to the Insolvency Service register. In 2021, GFH took possession of properties connected to Haigh in Cornwall in enforcement of the judgment debt.

=== Private prosecution attempt ===
While detained, Haigh instructed English lawyers to seek a private prosecution of GFH and its former external lawyer for human trafficking and fraud; the application was subsequently withdrawn, and a later challenge by judicial review was dismissed by the High Court in May 2020.

=== Regulatory proceedings ===
In 2018 the Solicitors Regulation Authority issued disciplinary proceedings against Haigh before the Solicitors Disciplinary Tribunal, alleging that he had misappropriated £617,000 held for GFH in the client account of the law firm Gibson Dunn by instructing ten illegitimate payments supported by false invoice details. In March 2023 the tribunal stayed the proceedings on the grounds that medical evidence consistently showed Haigh unfit to participate; the stay may be revisited if he applies for a practising certificate.

== Detention conditions and torture allegations ==
Haigh has stated that during his detention in Dubai he was subjected to torture and rape, describing being taken from his cell at night, beaten, tasered, struck in the face, and forced to hold stress positions to coerce a confession. He stated that he was initially permitted to see his lawyer for only minutes at a time and was denied access to legal documents. Human Rights Watch took up his case after he was detained a second time, one day before his scheduled release, on a slander charge that was later dropped. Upon his return to the UK in 2016, he filed a complaint with the British embassy and called on the UK government to issue clearer travel warnings for the UAE.

In 2017, Haigh gave evidence over two days at Edinburgh Sheriff Court in Lord Advocate (for the Government of the UAE) v. Black, an extradition case in which the UAE sought the extradition of a British national. In the published opinion, Sheriff Thomas Welsh QC described Haigh as "an honest intelligent witness" and stated that he believed Haigh's account of squalid and insanitary detention conditions, that he believed Haigh had been sexually assaulted and raped during his detention, and that he accepted Haigh's evidence regarding the lack of consular protection. The extradition request was subsequently refused.

Haigh stated that he experienced post-traumatic stress disorder following his detention, during which he reported feeling suicidal. He spent two months receiving treatment at the Priory Hospital in 2015.

== Advocacy and Latifa campaign ==
Since his release, Haigh has described himself as a human rights lawyer and crisis manager, campaigning on detention conditions, torture allegations, Interpol red notices, and extradition in the UAE. He founded Haigh International Justice and co-founded the British non-governmental organization Detained International in 2018.

Haigh acted as a representative of Sheikha Latifa bint Mohammed Al Maktoum in her campaign against her father, the ruler of Dubai, and featured in a February 2020 BBC Panorama documentary about her case. In August 2021, Amnesty International's forensic analysis confirmed that Haigh's mobile phone had been infected with NSO Group's Pegasus spyware in August 2020, making him the first British person confirmed to have such forensic evidence on his phone. The infection occurred two weeks after Latifa, with whom Haigh had been in covert contact via a smuggled phone, stopped responding to messages.

== LGBTQ+ advocacy ==
In 2013, Haigh became the first openly gay managing director of an English football club while at Leeds United. Under his tenure, Leeds United became the first Stonewall Diversity Champion in English football, partnering with the charity to promote gay equality within the sport.

In November 2017, PinkNews credited Haigh, along with Robbie Rogers and Thomas Hitzlsperger, with helping to pave the way for openly gay players and managers in association football. Also in 2017, Haigh co-launched the #ComeOut2Play campaign alongside Diva and OutNewsGlobal publisher Linda Riley and Gay Times to support LGBTQ professional footballers considering coming out.

He later served on the management board of the Cornwall County Football Association and chaired its Inclusivity Advisory Group, advising on LGBTQ matters and diversity in Cornish football. Haigh was shortlisted for the National Diversity Awards in the Positive Role Model (LGBTQ) category in both 2020 and 2022.
