= Brandon Francis =

British actor, producer and screenwriter

- Born: Justin Christopher Davis; 9 March 1981 (age 45); Marion, Ohio, United States
- Occupations: Actor, producer, screenwriter
- Years active: 1983–present

Brandon Francis (born Justin Christopher Davis; 9 March 1981) is a British actor, producer and screenwriter.

== Early life ==
Francis was born in Marion, Ohio. He moved to Norfolk, England with his mother and sister when he was three years old.

== Career ==
Francis began his acting career with London's National Youth Theatre. Outside of Britain, he pursued a variety of stage and film projects that took him back to the United States and eventually to Japan. A string of appearances on Japanese television led Francis to divide his time between Tokyo and his home in London.

Notable work includes the documentary film Kicking It. Narrated by Colin Farrell, the documentary premiered at Sundance Film Festival in 2008. The documentary allowed Francis to champion several social causes with which he is actively involved. The New York Times said that the film is "so earnest it hurts" in its treatment of homelessness and poverty.

Francis ventured outside acting when he wrote and produced Bollocks, which premiered in Greece at the Peloponnesian International Film Festival in 2012.

== Charity work ==
Outside of film and television, Francis is active with humanitarian causes. After the devastating 2010 Haiti earthquake, he led efforts to organise fundraising activities in Oxford.

== Filmography ==
=== Film ===
- Kicking It (2008), Himself
- Axed (2012), Sam Weeks
- Bollocks (2012), Bob
- The Legend of Tarzan (2016), Belgian soldier (uncredited)
- Psychic Kusuo (2017)
- Godai: The Wunderkind (2020), James

=== Television ===
- Asu no Kimi ga Motto Suki (2018), Eddie
- Omotenashi no Kiso Eigo (2019), Robert
