= Attleborough Academy =

Location
- 9 Norwich Road; Attleborough, Norfolk, NR17 2AJ; England
- Coordinates: 52°31′12″N 1°01′09″E

Information
- Type: Academy
- Trust: Sapentia Education Trust
- Department for Education URN: 140534 Tables
- Ofsted: Reports
- Headteacher: Neil McShane
- Gender: Coeducational
- Age: 11 to 18
- Houses: Boudicca, Kett, Nelson & Cavell
- Colours: Purple and Blue
- Website: https://www.attleboroughacademy.org/

Attleborough Academy/Attleborough Academy Norfolk (AA/AAN) (formerly Attleborough High School) is a coeducational secondary school and sixth form with academy status, located in Attleborough in the English county of Norfolk.

Previously a community school administered by Norfolk County Council, Attleborough High School became a specialist Mathematics and Computing College in 2008. As part of this, the school became a Microsoft®Academy in 2010. In May 2013 the school launched a consultation on the possibility of converting to academy status. Attleborough High School formally became an academy on 1 January 2014, and was renamed Attleborough Academy Norfolk, sponsored by the TEN Group. Following the restructure of the TEN Group, Attleborough Academy Norfolk became "Attleborough Academy" and is sponsored by the Sapientia Education Trust

Attleborough Academy offers GCSEs, NVQs and BTEC First Certificates as programmes of study for pupils. The sixth form centre offers A Levels and advanced BTECs, some of which are offered in partnership with Wymondham College.

== Academic results ==
For the school's 2019 GCSE results, the Progress 8 score of 0.18, which puts Attleborough Academy in the top 30% nationally for Progress 8, and 67% of students achieved grades 4-9 in GCSE English and Maths; above the Norfolk average of 63.5%.

== 2009 attack threat ==
In March 2009, a 16-year-old student posted a threat on the website Newgrounds stating that he would go to the school with a gas canister, set fire to the building and commit other acts of violence. A Newgrounds user from Montreal, Quebec, Canada notified English authorities via Skype after seeing the threat. The student was found carrying a knife, matches and a plastic gas canister containing flammable liquid, and was arrested for threats to commit criminal damage and possession of an offensive weapon, to which he admitted. He was then held under the Mental Health Act.
