= Stanley Banham =

English cricketer

Stanley Tattersall Banham (21 September 1913 – 29 December 1984) was an English cricketer. He was a right-handed batsman and wicket-keeper who played for Lancashire. He was born in Sharneyford, Bacup, Lancashire and died in Peterborough, Cambridgeshire.

Banham, who played for Bacup in the Lancashire League for seven seasons, made a single first-class appearance for Lancashire during the 1939 season, against the touring West Indians. He did not bat or bowl in the match, and took just a single catch, his victim being Derek Sealy.
