= Stephen Banham =

Australian typographer

Stephen Banham is an Australian typographer, type designer, writer, lecturer and founder of Letterbox, a typographic studio.

== Biography ==
Banham was born in Melbourne in 1968. In 2003 he completed a Master of Design (Research) and in 2019 was awarded a PhD for his work on the proposition of the 'typographic lens'. Banham has been lecturing in the field of typography since 1990.

In 1991 he printed the first small issue of Qwerty, the first in a series of six spiral-bound issues.

Banham has also been a contributor to, or featured in, design publications including Baseline magazine, Emigre, Adbusters, Face, Typo, Eye, Monument, Desktop, Grafik, Comma amongst others. He has spoken at design events in New York, Lebanon, Qatar, New Zealand, England, Spain and Australia. In 2011 he was inducted into the International Society of Typographic Designers (ISTD).
