= Aslie Pitter =

British footballer

Aslie Pitter MBE (born 1960) is a British footballer who joined Stonewall F.C., Britain's first and most successful gay football club, in 1991. He was appointed a Member of the Order of the British Empire (MBE) in the 2011 New Year Honours, "for voluntary service to Stonewall FC".

Pitter grew up in Balham, South London. His parents, Vincent and Evelyn, were Jamaican immigrants. Pitter realised at the age of 10 that he was gay, and dealt with homophobic abuse from his schoolmates. He has played football since his youth for a number of amateur clubs. He was chosen to play midfield for the Sutton United youth team and had a trial at Wimbledon. While playing for his local club, he suffered homophobia from other players and was dropped from the first team to the fourth team after one of his teammates found out that he was gay. Observing that they wanted him gone, Pitter quit. In 1991, after seeing a listing in Capital Gay and Time Out, he joined a group of gay men playing football in Regent's Park. This was Stonewall F.C., the first gay football club in Britain.

In November 2010, he was informed that he would be appointed a MBE for his work against homophobia in football. His father died shortly after, before the honours list was made public in December. Pitter collected his MBE from Buckingham Palace on 8 February 2011 accompanied by his sister, his fiancé, and his future mother-in-law. He was conferred with an Honorary Doctorate by the University of East London in 2011.

Pitter lives in Balham with his husband Alan Glover and works as an assistant manager at Boots. He plays for Stonewall F.C. while also managing and coaching their women and non-binary 1st and 2nds teams.
