= Banham Poultry =

Poultry producer in Norfolk, England

Banham Poultry is a British poultry producer, based in Attleborough, Norfolk, with an annual turnover of £100 million.

In 2018, the company was put up for sale; a few days later, two pest control contractors were found dead near the Banham site.

The company has more than 1,000 employees. The company was bought by Chesterfield Poultry in October 2018.

In late October 2021, Banham Poultry was bought by the Boparan Private Office, owner of poultry processor 2 Sisters Food Group and Bernard Matthews.

In September 2022, Branham Poultry was fined £300,000 for environmental permit violations after over 300 complaints were made regarding the strong odours of rotting carcasses. The company pleaded guilty to failing to keep activities free from odour levels likely to cause pollution outside the abattoir between January 2019 and September 2021. The judge acknowledged practices at Banham Poultry had a "significant effect on the quality of life" in the town.
