= LGBTQ media =

Media made for and/or by LGBTQ people

LGBTQ media or queer media is media created by LGBTQ individuals or groups or for which the primary target audience is LGBTQ people. Prominent types of LGBTQ media include periodicals, films, art, literature, video games, and television.

The first gay journal in the world, Der Eigene, was published in Berlin beginning in 1896. However, for the most part, LGBTQ media emerged in the 20th century, with creators tending towards self-published media due to restrictions and censorship in corporate media. Radio, magazines, newspapers, zines, and public-access television are some such avenues that LGBTQ creators and activists have used. With the rise of the internet, LGBTQ media has also found a home online, with podcasts and internet radio being accessible to a larger audience than traditional print or broadcast media.

LGBTQ media is used for a variety of purposes, including to share news or educational material, for entertainment, and for self-expression. LGBTQ representation in popular media can influence the self-perceptions of LGBTQ people, especially youth.

== Overview ==
Some LGBTQ media is created by out LGBTQ individuals or groups of out LGBTQ people. LGBTQ creators do not always include LGBTQ themes or issues in the media that they produce, but there are often at least subtle references to queerness in these media. LGBTQ media may also be defined by its intended target audience; under this definition, LGBTQ media is created for a primary target audience is LGBTQ people. LGBTQ+ allies are a secondary target audience, and in some instances, as a form of activism, LGBTQ media may also target an audience of people who oppose gay rights.

There have been both positive and negative representations of gay people across popular media, including film, television, literature, press, etc.

LGBTQ representation in the media is powerful, particularly for youth. There have been studies that have shown that media can have an influence on LGBTQ+ people's self-realization, coming out, and current identities.

== Africa ==
=== Namibia ===
Namibian LGBTQ organization The Rainbow Project has broadcast the radio show Talking Pink in the country since 1999.

=== Tunisia ===
In 2018, Shams Rad was founded in the country's capital, Tunis; the station is the self-proclaimed "only gay radio station" in the Arab world. The station airs music and programs discussing LGBTQ issues, but presenters do not "identify themselves as sexually active on air" due to laws in Tunisia that criminalize homosexuality. The station is partially funded by the Dutch embassy. Station director Bouhdid Belhedi has reported receiving death threats for his part in the station.

=== South Africa ===
By 2007, In the Pink was broadcast on Bush Radio in Cape Town, being the country's "only gay radio program". As of 2016, GaySAradio, based in Pretoria, was the country's only LGBTQ radio station.

== Asia ==
=== China ===
Les+ Magazine, a magazine aimed at queer women, was founded in Beijing in 2005.

=== India ===
==== Magazines and newspapers ====
India's first LGBTQ magazines appeared in the 1990s, with Bombay Dost in 1990 and Pravartak in 1991. Prominent zines in the 1990s and 2000s also included Gaysi Zine and Scripts.

==== Radio ====
In July 2017, India's self-proclaimed "first LGBTQ radio show", titled Gaydio, launched. The show was a two-hour weekly program, broadcast in Mumbai and two other cities.

=== Iran ===
In October 2012, Radio Ranginkaman launched as a 30-minute program for the LGBTQ community. Since then, it has grown into its own station, and broadcasts on shortwave, satellite and online radio. It broadcasts in both Dari and Persian.

== Europe ==
LGBTQ periodicals began being published in European countries in the 1970s, and have been published in a number of countries, including Hungary (Mások, 1991) Ireland (Gay Community News, 1988), the Netherlands (Gay Krant, 1980), Romania (Switch, 2005) and Sweden (QX, 1995).

=== Denmark ===
Radio Rosa launched in Copenhagen on June 22, 1983, with the backing of the Danish National Association of Gays and Lesbians. The station closed in 2010.

=== France ===
==== Periodicals ====
France began seeing LGBTQ magazines in the late 1970s, with Gai pied in 1979. The 1980s saw further publications, including Gaie France (1986) and Illico (1988).

==== Radio ====
Clandestine radio broadcasts by lesbians occurred as early as 1978, by the group Les Radioteuses, who were shut down following their first broadcast. The group reorganized as Radio Nanas, and legally in 1981 as Les Nanas Radioteuses.

The early 1980s saw a number of gay and lesbian radio programs in France as state control of radio officially ended. The lesbian radio collective Femmes Entre Elles (Canal Gay Radio Savane, Rennes) produced multiple lesbian programs, as did the broadcasting collective Les Jardins de Selene (Amiens); other collectives also existed in Marseille and Paris.

The Parisian free radio station Fréquence Gaie was launched in 1981; in 1982, it became the "world's first 24-hour gay radio program". Originally aimed primarily at gay men, programs produced by and for lesbians began to increase under the leadership of station president Genevieve Pastre, elected in June 1982. In early 1983, the station was rated fourth in the city in a public opinion survey. Due to financial troubles, the station floundered, and its LGBTQ audience had largely left by 1985.

By 1983, stations broadcasting gay and lesbian programming, called "antennes roses" (English: "Pink stations") existed in at least 27 French towns and cities; by 1984, there were between 36 and 50. In 1984, the first International Meeting of Male and Female Hosts of Homosexual Broadcasts in France was held.

=== Germany ===
==== Periodicals ====
The first gay journal in the world, Der Eigene, was published in Berlin beginning in 1896 by Adolf Brand. A number of LGBTQ periodicals were published in Weimar Germany, including Die Insel (1926) and Das 3. Geschlecht (1930), which is thought to be the first transvestite magazine in history. Weimar Germany was also home to multiple lesbian periodicals, including Die Freundin (1924), Frauenliebe (1926) and Die BIF (mid to late 1920s). These publications had ceased by 1933, with the rise of the Nazi party to power.

In the second half of the 20th century, Siegessäule, established in 1984, became a major LGBTQ periodical in Germany.

==== Radio ====
In August 1985, the twice-weekly LGBTQ program Eldoradio began airing on the Berlin Cable Network. Named after Eldorado, a gay bar in Berlin during the 1920s, the two-hour program had "music, jokes, and self-produced radio plays" during the Sunday time slot, with Wednesday's program focusing on news and reporting. By the end of the year, Eldoradio had joined Radio 100, a "consort of alternative media groups" from Berlin. The show ended in 1989, due to financial troubles, including lack of advertisers.

=== Malta ===
Malta has a DAB station which broadcasts GlitterBeam, an LGBTQ station based in the United Kingdom.

=== Portugal ===
In Portugal, lesbian feminist activists published the zines Organa (1990–1992) and Lilás (1993–2002). In addition to original content, these publications also carried translations of works "by lesbian feminist authors from countries like the United States, the United Kingdom, and France".

=== Spain ===
In Spain, LGBTQ activists began publishing literature of their own in the late 1970s.

In 1991, Madrid-based gay activist group La Radical Gai (LRG) began publishing De un Plumazo, a zine which had six total issues and two dossiers, with its final issue in 1996. The group's 1993 issue was titled Queerzine; it is thought that this was the first usage of "queer" in a Spanish context. Topics covered included HIV/AIDS, politics, art, and literature.

Lesbian activist group Lesbianas Sin Duda (LSD) contributed to some articles in Queerzine, but stated their own zine, Non-Grata, in 1994; this publication had four issues in total. Topic covered included lesbian visibility, HIV/AIDS, art, and Spanish translations of queer theory articles by English-language writers.

=== United Kingdom ===
==== Magazines and newspapers ====
In the United Kingdom, the 1960, 1970s, and 1980s saw a number of LGBTQ magazines and newspapers established, including Arena Three (1964-1971), Gay News (1972-1983), Capital Gay (1981-1995) and Pink Paper (1987-2009). In the 21st century, the U.K. is home to online newspaper PinkNews.

==== Radio ====
In 1982, the community radio program Gaywaves began broadcast on a pirate station Our Radio in London. The two-hour program aired weekly on Wednesday nights. Although the show tried to include some lesbian programming, the program was mostly listened to by gay men, with programming shifting to reflect that. Segments included interviews, news, and skits. Program organizers also tried to incorporate material on the lives of gay men and lesbians outside the U.K.

By the 1990s, the BBC hosted five gay and lesbian radio shows: A Sunday Outing, Gay and Lesbian London, Gaytalk, Loud'n'proud, and Out This Week.

== Middle East ==
The Middle East has seen its first LGBTQ periodicals in the 21st century, including My.Kali, founded in 2007, and El Shad, created in 2014.

The Za'faraan Collective, which focuses on the experiences of LGBTQ migrants in the Middle East, began publishing a digital zine in 2019.

== North America ==
=== Canada ===
==== Comics ====
Beginning in 1987, Canadian lesbian cartoonist Noreen Stevens illustrated the comic strip The Chosen Family, which featured LGBTQ characters and was based on Stevens' own experiences.

==== Periodicals ====
A number of LGBTQ-related periodicals have been published in Canada, in both English and French-speaking communities. Les Mouches fantastiques, the earliest known gay or lesbian periodical on the continent, was published in Montreal from 1918 to 1920. Early Canadian periodicals in the gay rights movement included Gay (1964), TWO (1964), The Body Politic (1971), FILE Megazine (1972), Amazones d'Hier, Lesbiennes d'Aujourd'hui (1982), Perceptions (1983), Wayves (1983), Fugues (1984), and Rites (1984). One of the first queer zines, J.D.s, was published by G.B Jones and Bruce LaBruce from 1985 until 1991.

In 2012, LGBTQ literary magazine Plenitude was launched in Canada.

==== Radio ====
In Canada, the rise of LGBTQ radio programs occurred alongside the expansion of community radio, with the first community radio stations launching in 1974.

On August 9, 1978, Gay News and Views made its debut on CKMS-FM, a community radio station run by the University of Waterloo. The program, the "first regularly scheduled gay radio program in Canada", was produced by the Kitchener-Waterloo Gay Media Collective. In September 1978, Vancouver saw its first gay radio program with Coming Out, broadcast on Vancouver Co-operative Radio (CFRO-FM). In June 1979, the Lesbian Show debuted on CFRO-FM, becoming the country's first lesbian radio program. According to a co-founder of the Lesbian Show, Silva Tenenbein, the show grew out of tensions within the "male-dominated" Coming Out program and larger tensions within the Canadian feminist community.

By the mid-1990s, CITR-FM in Vancouver was broadcasting the program Queer FM.

In April 2007, Proud FM was launched in Toronto, becoming the country's "first mainstream, commercial station" for an LGBTQ audience.

=== United States ===
==== Books and pamphlets ====
The early 1970s saw the publication of texts by lesbian feminists, such as Del Martin and Phyllis Lyon's Lesbian/Woman in 1972 and Jill Johnston's Lesbian Nation in 1973.

In 1977, American gay authors Charles Silverstein and Edmund White released the sex manual The Joy of Gay Sex. In 1982, the Sisters of Perpetual Indulgence published Play Fair!, a brochure about safe sex for gay men.

In 1981, the lesbian feminist S/M organisation Samois, based in San Francisco, published the anthology Coming to Power. The work combined short stories with advice.

==== Comics ====
Beginning in 1983, American lesbian cartoonist Alison Bechdel illustrated Dykes to Watch Out For, a comic strip revolving around a primarily lesbian cast. In 1989, gay cartoonist Eric Orner launched The Mostly Unfabulous Social Life of Ethan Green, a comic strip featuring a gay male protagonist.

==== Film ====
The Motion Picture Production Code, an industry guideline in which Hollywood's motion picture producers agreed to self-censor all major motion pictures from 1934 to 1968, led to LGBTQ invisibility in film in United States film. However, even in the 1960s and 1970s, when LGBTQ representation in film was becoming more commonplace, it was also becoming more homophobic. Gay characters in this time period were represented very negatively, whether that meant they were dangerous and suicidal, or predatory and violent. Examples of such movies include The Children's Hour, The Boys in the Band, Midnight Express, and Vanishing Point.

In 1977, American director Arthur J. Bressan Jr. released Gay USA, thought to be the first documentary by and about LGBTQ people.

In the 1990s, films that included LGBTQ themes, such as The Birdcage, Philadelphia, To Wong Foo Thanks for Everything, Flawless and In & Out were quite popular. 2005, Brokeback Mountain grossed over $178 million and in 2017, Moonlight won the Academy Award for Best Picture along with Actor in a Supporting Role and Adapted Screenplay.

The gay man and heterosexual woman couple has become a popular film genre in recent years. This coupling exists in popular films such as My Best Friend's Wedding, The Object of My Affection, and The Next Best Thing. According to Helene Shugart, writing in Critical Studies in Media Communication, homosexuality is recoded and modified in these films to approve sexism and heteronormativity.

==== Magazines and newspapers ====
Prior to the beginning of the gay rights movement, some gay and lesbian magazines were published in the U.S. Vice Versa, published 1947 and 1948, is the earliest known lesbian periodical in the U.S. The first national distributed lesbian periodical was The Ladder, founded in 1956. Publications in the 1960s included Drum (Philadelphia, 1964) and The Advocate (Los Angeles, 1967). In 1966, midwest gay activist Drew Shafer founded The Phoenix: Midwest Homophile Voice, the first known LGBTQ magazine published in the Midwestern U.S., in Kansas City, Missouri.

The beginning of the gay rights movement, from 1969 through the 1970s, saw a number of LGBTQ newspapers established across the country. These included Come Out! (New York City, 1969), The Gay Blade (Washington, D.C., 1969), Bay Area Reporter (San Francisco Bay Area, 1971), Fag Rag (Boston, 1971), Lavender Woman (Chicago, 1971), Chicago Gay Crusader (1973), Gay Community News (Boston, 1973), the San Francisco Sentinel (1974), Philadelphia Gay News (1976), Gaysweek (New York City, 1977), and San Francisco Bay Times (1978).

Lesbian Connection, founded in 1974, is still in publication as of 2025 and is the longest-running periodical for lesbians in the United States.

==== Radio ====
In 1956, Pacifica Radio became the first known listener-sponsored non-commercial American radio network to allow openly LGBTQ individuals airtime.

One of the nation's earliest LGBTQ radio programs was Lesbian Nation (1972-1973), an interview show created by Martha Shelley, a member of the Daughters of Bilitis and the Gay Liberation Front. In 1975, the LGBTQ interview program Wilde 'n' Stein began broadcasting on Houston's KPFT station. In Hartford, Connecticut, Gay Spirit Radio began airing in November 1980. The program includes interviews, news, and music segments.

==== Television ====
The Code of Practices for Television Broadcasters indirectly prohibited positive homosexual representation from 1952 to 1983, preventing many queer actors in the television field from coming out and further preventing representation of the LGBTQ+ community in commercial television. However, many LGBTQ communities made use of public-access television to broadcast self-created programs. These included variety shows like The Emerald City (1977-1979), Gay Morning America (1984-1985) and Candied Camera (1990s), scripted programs, like soap opera Secret Passions, informational shows (Dyke TV, Gay USA) and interview programs like The Glennda and Brenda Show. In the 1980s, LGBTQ public access programs spoke frankly about the HIV/AIDS crisis, sharing information and educating viewers on the disease.

In 1997, Ellen became the first show to have a gay main character. After this, there was an increase in shows that included recurring gay characters such as Will & Grace, Dawson's Creek, Spin City, ER, Buffy the Vampire Slayer, Nightline, Queer Eye for the Straight Guy, Queer as Folk, The Young and the Restless, Ugly Betty and Glee.

In recent years, there has been a notable increase in the portrayal of LGBTQ+ characters and storylines across a wide range of television genres.

=== Mexico ===
Stereotypical representations of gay men appeared in Mexican cinema throughout the 20th century, and the first films to portray gay characters sympathetically included 1978's El lugar sin límites and 1984's Doña Herlinda and Her Son. Openly gay figures like Chavela Vargas, Juan Soriano, Carlos Monsiváis, and Juan Gabriel were often denigrated in the media for their identity.

A lesbian character appeared in the 1990s series Nada personal, and soon La vida en el espejo was the first telenovela to portray a gay character sympathetically. Over these decades, the New Queer Cinema movement supported many styles of LGBTQ cinema in Latin America.^{:142-143} During the 21st century, mass media began to discuss LGBTQ people and issues more openly.

== Oceania ==
=== Australia ===
LGBTQ literature was heavily censored in Australia during the 20th century. G.M. Glaskin wrote the first openly gay Australian novel, No End to the Way, released in 1967.

Queer culture and media gained visibility during the gay liberation movement in the 1970s. In 1978, the Gay Teachers and Students Group of Melbourne released Young, Gay and Proud, a book aimed at teenagers exploring a gay identity.

On December 1, 1993, Joy Melbourne 90.7, a volunteer-run gay and lesbian station, began broadcasting in Melbourne. The station was the country's first LGBTQ radio station.

=== New Zealand ===
In 1973, the Sisters for Homophile Equality (SHE) in Wellington, New Zealand founded The Circle, which continued to publish until 1986.

In the 1980s, Wellington Access Radio hosted multiple lesbian radio programs. The first of these was Leave the Dishes in the Sink, a feminist program which included some lesbians. In 1984, several lesbians developed an hour-long program, which aired once a month as part of the Womanzone feminist radio collective. In October 1984, the Lesbian Community Radio Programme (LCRP) was established. The weekly show had a variety of content, including news, poetry, educational segments, and updates on local events.

== South America ==
In Brazil, the zine Chanacomchana, published between 1981 and 1987, aimed to organize feminists around lesbian issues.

Gay characters have appeared in Latin American cinema since at least 1923.^{:75} LGBTQ characters were often used symbolically during films of the 1970s and 1980s. During the 1990s and 2000s, the New Queer Cinema movement supported many types of LGBTQ cinema.^{:142-143}

== Podcasts ==
Podcasts, as a form of media that can be independently published and easily accessible via internet, have been used by LGBTQ creators to avoid censorship or other restrictions posed by commercial radio. LGBTQ podcasts cover a variety of genres, including the talk show or interview format (Getting Curious with Jonathan Van Ness), audio dramas (The Penumbra Podcast, Welcome to Night Vale), and educational series focused on LGBTQ culture or history (Making Gay History, Nancy).

== Zines ==
Zines, a type of self-published written work, have been used by LGBTQ creators as a way to share information, fiction, or personal experiences related to LGBTQ identity. As they are self-published, zines allow creators to avoid censorship or other restrictions that publishing houses or authorities might put in place. For example, zines have been used to share health information and to criticize the healthcare system's treatment of LGBTQ people. Spanish LGBTQ activists have used zines to sustain "oppositional mobilization".

One notable LGBTQ zine is American writer Mira Bellwether's Fucking Trans Women.

The Queer Zine Archive Project in Milwaukee, Wisconsin, U.S. is one archive dedicated to this type of LGBTQ media.

== See also ==
- Censorship of LGBTQ issues
- LGBTQ marketing
- Lists of LGBTQ figures in fiction and myth
- List of LGBTQ-related films
- Queer coding
- Queerbaiting
