= Hornsey (disambiguation) =

Hornsey is a district of London, England.

Hornsey may also refer to:

- Hornsey (electoral division), a former electoral division for the Greater London Council
- Municipal Borough of Hornsey, until 1965
- Hornsey (parish), a parish in the historic county of Middlesex
- Hornsey (surname), people with the surname Hornsey
- Hornsey (ward), an electoral ward for the Haringey London Borough Council
- Hornsey (UK Parliament constituency), a former constituency for the House of Commons of the United Kingdom
