= Clitheroe Royal Grammar School =

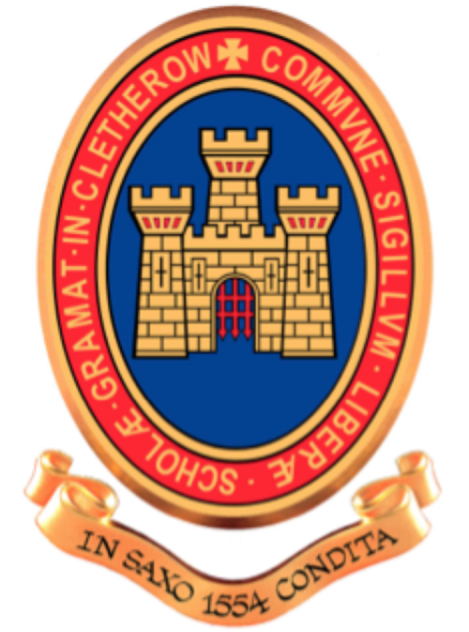

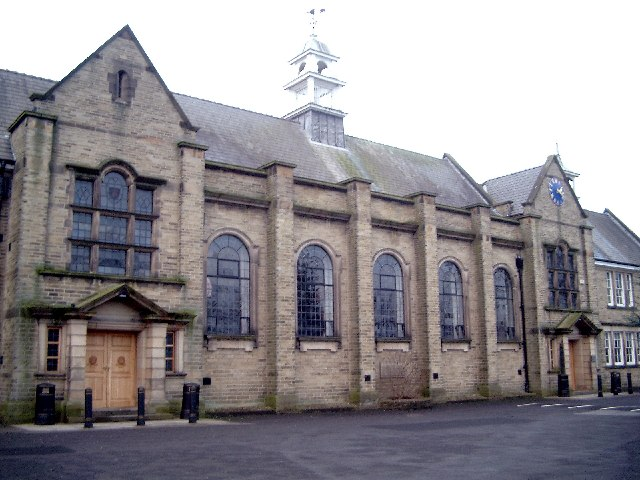

Location
- Chatburn Road; Clitheroe, Lancashire, BB7 2BA; England; 53.88°N 2.38°W

Information
- Type: Grammar school; Academy
- Motto: Latin: In Saxo Condita; "Founded on Rock"
- Established: 1554; 472 years ago
- Department for Education URN: 136390 Tables
- Ofsted: Reports
- Chairman of Governors: Andrew Clayton
- Headteacher: James Keulemans
- Gender: Mixed
- Age: 11 to 18
- Enrolment: 1,336 pupils
- Houses: Curie, Roosevelt, Galileo, Socrates, Turing, Angelou
- School Seal: Latin: Commune Sigillum Liberae Scholae Gramat In Cletherow; Common Seal of the Free Grammar School in Clitheroe
- Website: www.crgs.org.uk

Clitheroe Royal Grammar School is a co-educational grammar school in the town of Clitheroe in Lancashire, England, formerly an all-boys school. It was founded in 1554 as "The Free Grammar School of King Philip and Queen Mary" "for the education, instruction and learning of boys and young men in grammar; to be and to continue for ever."

After forty two years of sharing the school buildings with the boys, the newly-built Girls Grammar School opened in 1957, and merged with the Boys' Grammar School in 1985. CRGS celebrated its 450th anniversary in July 2004. At the same time, Stuart Holt retired as headteacher, having started in 1991. He was succeeded by Judith Child, who was headteacher until 2018. In September 2018, she was replaced by James Keulemans, a former international rugby player.

After becoming a Grant Maintained School in September 1991, Clitheroe Royal Grammar School became a Foundation School with a Foundation under the School Standards and Framework Act 1998. Most recently, on 1 January 2011, the school converted to Academy School Status under the Academies Act 2010.

Clitheroe Royal Grammar School continues to be based on two sites, with the Sixth Form Centre occupying the historic buildings on York Street, and the Main School at the former Girls' Grammar School buildings on Chatburn Road.

== Intake ==
The Main School has a yearly intake of 180 students, increased from 150 in 2022, who have each reached the required standard in the school's entrance examination, with places being offered preferentially to candidates living within the school's defined 'Catchment Area'. Pupils are then divided into six forms, named after the initials of the form tutor, and each assigned a house (C, R, G, S, A and T). The total number of students is roughly 750.

Sixth Form entry is based on GCSE performance and takes in around 330 students per year. The matriculation requirements are five grade Bs at GCSE, with at least a Grade C in English Language and Mathematics, while some subjects also require specific grades in related GCSE subjects.

== Sixth form ==
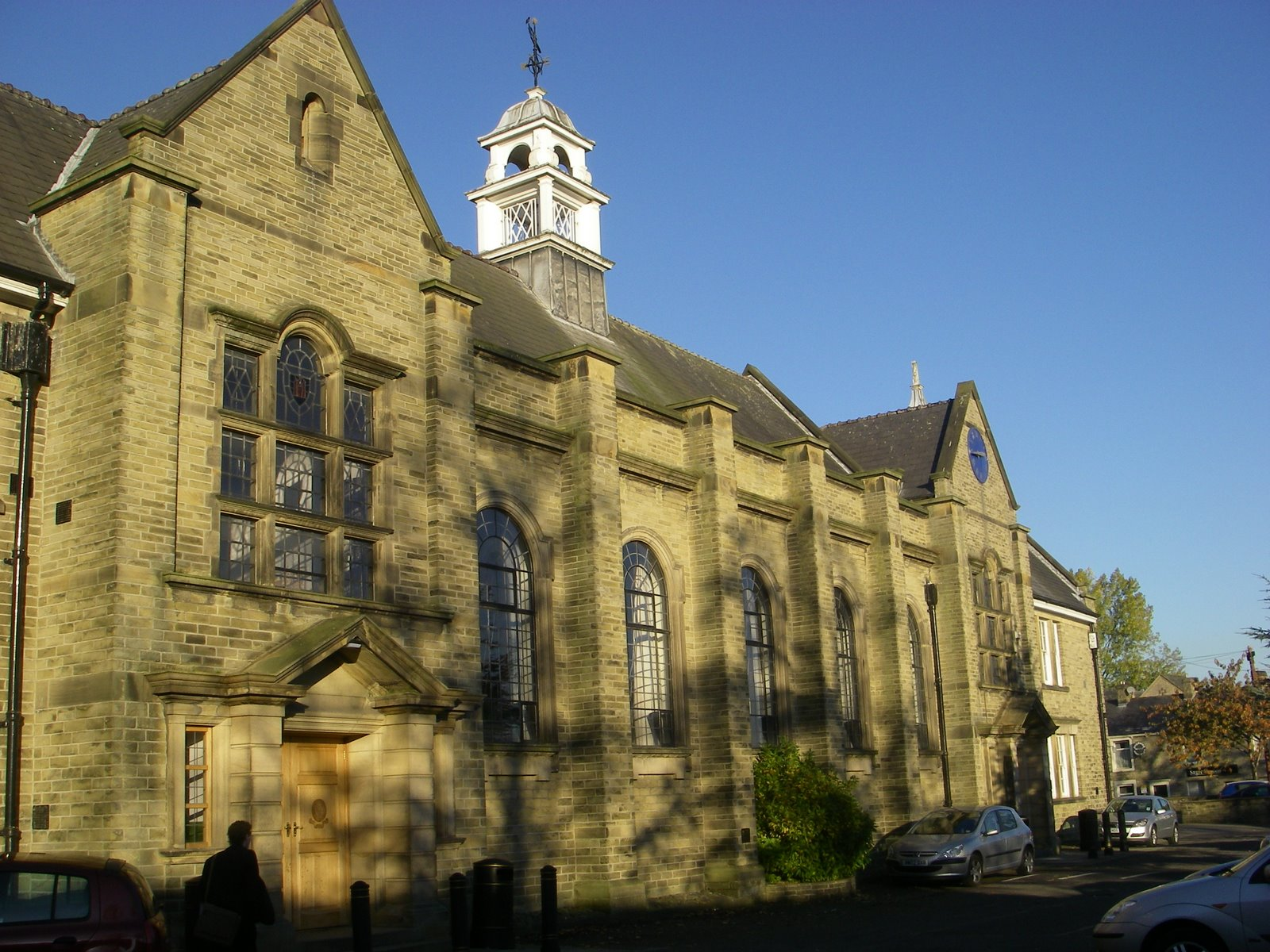
York Street Building

The school was originally based at St Mary's churchyard, and was moved to the York Street site in 1814, in rooms that are now used to teach Art and Foreign Languages. The school was extended in 1878, and again in 1914, to include what is now the Library. In 2009, the site was extended further to create more classrooms and a conference room.

== Commemoration Day ==
Every year the school holds a commemoration day to remember the founding of the school, on St. John the Baptist's Day in the local parish church of Mary Magdalene.

From the Statutes, dated 1622:

We ordaine and be yt a Statute of this Schoole for ever. That from henceforth once every year upon St John Baptists day called Midsommer day in the forenoone there shalbee a Sermon preached in the Church of Clitherow where the Maister Usher and Schoolers of the said Schoole shalbee p'sent before the Governors of the said Schoole and therein shalbee a comemoracon of the foundation of the said Schoole with an exhortation to the said Governors Schoolmr and Usher that they faithfully and diligently p'forme their duties.

Or, modernised:

Let this be a Statute of this school forever. Every year upon St John the Baptist's day (Midsummer's day) in the morning there shall be a Sermon preached in Clitheroe Church where the Master Usher and Scholars of the School shall be sent before the Governors the School and there shall be a commemoration of the foundation of the School with an exhortation to the Governors, Headteacher and Usher that they faithfully and diligently perform their duties.

== School newspaper ==
The school newspaper, the Royal Blazer, was printed three times a year until 2006.

In 2022, a new newspaper was introduced, named the York Street Times. This is published three times a year, and is currently still running.

== Notable former pupils ==
- Sir William Addison (1905–1992), historian and author
- William Blezard (1921–2003), composer
- Pattie Coldwell (1952–2002), television presenter and journalist
- Bryan Cowgill (1927–2008), senior BBC TV executive who devised Grandstand and Match of the Day, Controller of BBC1 from 1974 to 1977
- Martin Dobson (born 1948), footballer for Burnley and England
- Ross Eccles (born 1937), contemporary artist
- Peter Hargreaves (born 1946), co-founder of Hargreaves Lansdown
- Judith Hart, Baroness Hart of South Lanark DBE PC, (1924–1991), senior Labour Party politician, MP for Lanark and Clydesdale
- Jonathan Hinder (born 1990/91), Labour MP for Pendle and Clitheroe
- Michael Hindley (born 1947), Labour MEP from 1984 to 1994 for Lancashire East, and from 1994–9 for Lancashire South
- Captain James King (1750–1784), Royal Navy officer who saw service on Captain Cook's third voyage
- Samantha Murray (born 1989), modern pentathlon London 2012 Silver Olympic Medalist
- Norman Myers (1934-2019), environmentalist
- Amanda Parker (born 1962), Lord Lieutenant of Lancashire since 2023
- Dixon Robinson (1795–1878), Lancashire Lawyer, Steward of the Honor of Clitheroe, landowner, and philanthropist, resident of Clitheroe Castle
- Thomas Starkie (1782–1849), lawyer and jurist
- Jon Schofield (born 1985), Kayak K2 200m London 2012 Bronze Medalist, 2016 Olympic silver medallist.
- Arthur Joseph Wrigley (1902–1983), obstetrician and gynaecologist
- [[Kitt Nelson]] (born 2004), Professional Footballer for [[Preston North End F.C.]]

== See also ==
- Listed buildings in Clitheroe
- List of English and Welsh endowed schools (19th century)
