= Listings magazine =

Genre of periodical

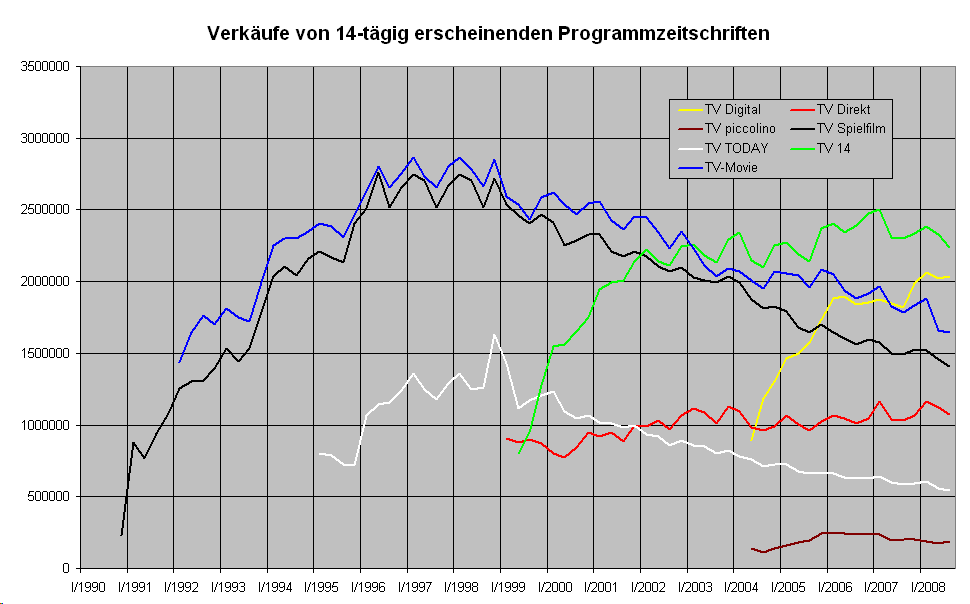
Sales of the fortnightly listings magazines in Germany.

A listings magazine is a publication largely dedicated to publishing information about the upcoming week's events, including broadcast programming, concerts, clubs, theatre performances, and film showings.

The BBC's Radio Times was the world's first listings magazine, founded in 1923 to compete with daily newspapers, which had previously fulfilled that role. In 1932, New York's Cue became the first city-specific listings magazine.

With the expansion of broadcast media, other listings followed, expanding the format to include columns on media production and personalities, such as TV Hebdo (Québec) in Canada and TV Guide in the United States. Broadcast guides are normally published as supplements to Saturday or Sunday newspapers, or are issued weekly or fortnightly. This has become a highly competitive area of publishing.

Other listings magazines originated from a focus on cultural events, such as Time Out magazine in the UK. Most major cities worldwide have one or more such publications.

During the 1970s and 1980s, these magazines, particularly in the UK, played a progressive role as part of the alternative press and gained a reputation for leftward leaning investigative and campaigning journalism. They were among the first consumer magazines to carry lists of "agitprop" events. City Limits was one of the most outspoken of UK-based listings magazines but almost all followed Time Out's lead in dedicating space to lesbian and gay events and clubs. In areas of the UK that had previously been dominated by regional newspapers with a conservative editorial stance, this represented the first time that gay issues received comparable coverage. This was particularly true of Bristol's Venue, Southampton's Due South Magazine, and, to a lesser extent, Manchester's City Life, where the local press (Manchester Evening News) had been, at times, more tolerant.

In Italy, the most important listings magazine has been TV Sorrisi e Canzoni, which reached a weekly circulation of over 2 million during the late 1980s.
