= Edward Kellett-Bowman =

British consultant and politician (1931–2022)

Edward Kellett-Bowman JP
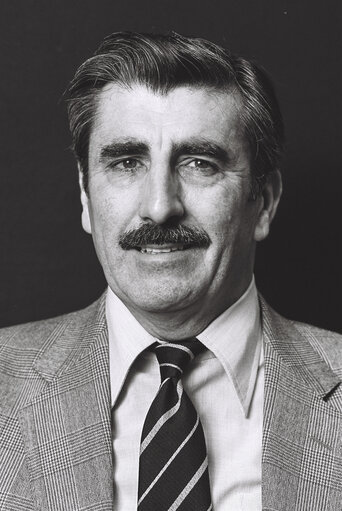

Member of the European Parliament for Itchen, Test and Avon
- In office 9 June 1994 – 10 June 1999
- Preceded by: Constituency established
- Succeeded by: Constituency abolished

Member of the European Parliament for Hampshire Central
- In office 15 December 1988 – 9 June 1994
- Preceded by: Basil de Ferranti
- Succeeded by: Constituency abolished

Member of the European Parliament for Lancashire East
- In office 7 June 1979 – 14 June 1984
- Preceded by: Constituency established
- Succeeded by: Michael Hindley

Personal details
- Born: Edward Thomas Bowman; 25 February 1931
- Died: 22 November 2022 (aged 91)
- Party: Conservative
- Spouses: Patricia Blakemore (m. 1960; died 1970) Elaine Kellett (m. 1971; died 2014)
- Education: Reed's School; Slough College of Technology

Edward Thomas Kellett-Bowman JP (born Bowman; 25 February 1931 – 22 November 2022) was a British business and management consultant. He had a political career as a local councillor and as a Member of the European Parliament (MEP) for the Conservative Party. His work in the European Parliament was effective in shaping policy and he only narrowly missed being chosen to lead the Conservative group.

== Early career ==
Bowman went to Reed's School in Cobham, Surrey and Slough College of Technology. He had technical and management training in textiles from 1951 to 1953, and then worked in textile industry management for two years. He then joined a company of pharmaceutical manufacturing chemists, working as a manager.

== London municipal politics ==
Kellett-Bowman was already active in the Conservative Party as chairman of the Young Conservative Council of London and an executive member of the London Conservative Union. In 1957 Bowman was elected to Holborn Borough Council, but having moved by the time of the next election, in 1959 he was elected to St Pancras Borough Council. He was the Conservative candidate in Pontefract at the 1959 general election.

=== London County Council ===
In 1960, Bowman married Patricia Blakemore, who was one of the most vigorous election agents in the Conservative Party in London. She had already proved her skill as agent for Holborn and St Pancras South in 1959 and gained a marginal seat. In 1961, Edward Bowman was selected as candidate for the same division in the London County Council election, his wife was again agent. Winning the seat for her husband was said to be the happiest moment of her life.

After reorganisation of local government in London, Bowman was defeated in elections to Camden London Borough Council in 1964, but was chosen by the elected councillors as an Alderman. His wife was elected to Barnet London Borough Council in 1968, but soon fell ill and died in February 1970. When Bowman married fellow Camden councillor and Member of Parliament for Lancaster Elaine Kellett (who like him had been widowed) in 1971, the couple joined their names and adopted the surname 'Kellett-Bowman'.

== Business consultancy ==
Kellett-Bowman gave up his job to study for a Master of Business Administration degree at Cranfield Institute of Technology in 1972, and in 1974 became a business and management consultant in private practice. He became a Freeman of the City of London in 1978 and a Liveryman of the Wheelwrights Company in 1979. He was also a Fellow of the Chartered Management Institute.

== European Parliament ==
At the 1979 elections to the European Parliament, Kellett-Bowman was chosen as the Conservative Party candidate for the Lancashire East constituency, which stretched from Blackburn to Nelson, including Clitheroe and Heywood. He won the seat with a majority of over 14,000, although only three out of the eight Parliamentary constituencies making up the seat were Conservative. At the same election, his wife was elected in the neighbouring constituency of Cumbria and Lancashire North.

=== Audit work ===
Kellett-Bowman specialised in budget and audit and in 1981 presented a report about budgetary control at the Joint Research Centre in Ispra near Milan. The report found its funds were managed in way that concealed their details, and an administrative building had been built without permission. In February 1982, Kellett-Bowman criticised the sale of farm surpluses to the Soviet bloc, and accused the European Commission of distorting the foreign policy of the free world.

=== Federalism ===
At the 1984 European Parliament election, Kellett-Bowman lost his seat. He returned to the European Parliament in a byelection in December 1988 in the Hampshire Central constituency. In July 1990 he supported a motion calling for a new constitution for Europe which would give the European Communities a federal structure. The motion also called for economic and monetary union, including a single currency, although others who had voted for the motion said that the translation was inaccurate. Four years later, Kellett-Bowman pointed out that in unambiguous votes on a federal Europe in March 1990 and February 1994 he had voted against.

=== Transit crime ===
As a MEP, Kellett-Bowman served on the governing body of the European People's Party in the late 1990s. He brought in a report to the European Parliament in February 1997 which identified the removal of border controls and a lack of co-operation by member states as being responsible for the rise in organised crime and smuggling. Kellett-Bowman's report led to the European Union setting up a customs investigation body and computerising transit-monitoring systems.

=== Conservative leadership ===
In September 1997, Kellett-Bowman stood for the leadership of the Conservative group of MEPs, and lost by one vote to Edward McMillan-Scott. He made an attack on mergers of accountancy firms in early 1998, urging the Commission to place a lower limit on the number of large firms so that there would never be fewer than five.

== Later career ==
At the 1999 election, Kellett-Bowman was placed seventh on the Conservative Party list in South East England, the lowest of all the sitting MEPs, making it very difficult for him to be elected. In the results the Conservatives won only five seats and thereafter Kellett-Bowman returned to management consultancy.

In February 2006 Kellett-Bowman made a formal complaint to the European Parliament authorities accusing Chris Huhne, then a candidate for the Liberal Democrat leadership, of misusing Parliamentary funds to support his election campaign in Eastleigh during the 2005 general election. Kellett-Bowman denounced Huhne for "fraudulent use of public funds", pointing to the fact that Eastleigh was a marginal constituency. The European Parliament took no regulatory action.

== Personal life and death ==
Kellett-Bowman died on 22 November 2022, at the age of 91.

European Parliament
New constituency	Member of the European Parliament for Lancashire East; 1979–1984	Succeeded by Michael Hindley
Preceded by Basil de Ferranti	Member of the European Parliament for Hampshire Central; 1988–1994	Constituency abolished
New constituency	Member of the European Parliament for Itchen, Test and Avon; 1994–1999	Constituency abolished
