= Cumbria (European Parliament constituency) =

Former European Parliament constituency

- European Parliament constituency
- Boundary within North West England (1979-1984)
- Member state: United Kingdom
- Created: 1979
- Dissolved: 1984
- MEPs: 1

Prior to its uniform adoption of proportional representation in 1999, the United Kingdom used first-past-the-post for the European elections in Great Britain. The European Parliament constituencies used under that system were smaller than the later regional constituencies and only had one Member of the European Parliament each.

Created for the 1979 European Parliament elections in 1979, Cumbria was a single-member constituency formed from the grouping of numerous neighbouring British Parliament constituencies.

The constituency saw only one election under the chosen boundaries, with the county of Cumbria and electors in Westminster constituencies as far south as the Fylde coast electing its MEP as one constituency in 1979 only. In subsequent elections, the constituency became the expanded Cumbria and Lancashire North.

== Boundaries ==
- Barrow-in-Furness; Carlisle; Fylde North; Lancaster; Morecambe and Lonsdale; Penrith and the Border; Westmorland; Whitehaven; Workington

== Members of the European Parliament ==
Election	Member	Party
1979	Elaine Kellett-Bowman	Conservative

== Election results ==
European Parliament election, 1979: Cumbria
Party	Candidate	Votes	%	±%
Conservative	Elaine Kellett-Bowman	104,471	56.4	
Labour	H Little	62,485	33.7	
Liberal	E M (Beth) Graham	16,631	9.0	
Independent	E Burrows	1,596	0.9	
Majority		41,986	22.7	
Turnout		183,587	34.9	
Conservative win (new seat)				
