= Elaine Kellett-Bowman =

British politician (1923–2014)

Dame Elaine Kellett-Bowman DBE
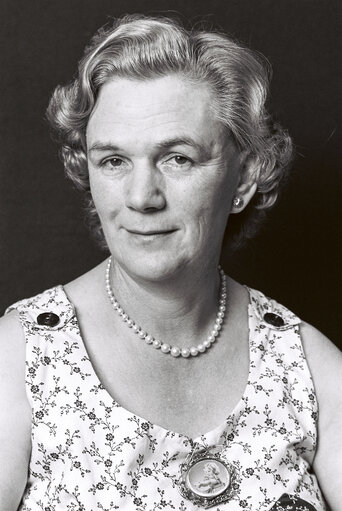
- Official portrait, 1984

Member of Parliament for Lancaster
- In office 18 June 1970 – 8 April 1997
- Preceded by: Stanley Henig
- Succeeded by: Constituency abolished

Member of the European Parliament for Cumbria
- In office 7 June 1979 – 14 June 1984
- Preceded by: Constituency created
- Succeeded by: Sheila Faith for Cumbria and Lancashire North

Personal details
- Born: Mary Elaine Kay; 8 July 1923
- Died: 4 March 2014 (aged 90)
- Party: Conservative
- Spouses: Charles Norman Kellett (m. 1945; died 1959) Edward Bowman (m. 1971)
- Children: 4 (to Charles Norman Kellett)

Dame Mary Elaine Kellett-Bowman, DBE (née Kay; 8 July 1923 – 4 March 2014) was a British Conservative Party politician, serving as Member of Parliament (MP) for the constituency of Lancaster for 27 years from 1970 to 1997. She also served a single term in the European Parliament from 1979 to 1984.

== Life and career ==
Born Mary Elaine Kay to Walter and Edith (née Leather) Kay, she was educated at The Mount School, York, St Anne's College, Oxford, and Barnett House, Oxford, and became a barrister, called to the bar by Middle Temple in 1964. She served as a councillor on Denbigh Borough Council, 1952–55, and the London Borough of Camden, 1968–74. She was also a governor of Culford School in Suffolk from 1963 to 2003.

As Mary Kellett, she contested Nelson and Colne in 1955, South West Norfolk twice in 1959 (including a by-election), and Buckingham in 1964 and 1966. She was MP for Lancaster from 1970 until her retirement in 1997. She also served as a Member of the European Parliament in the British delegation from 1975, and was then elected for Cumbria in 1979. She remained an MEP until 1984, when she stepped down in order to concentrate on her seat in the British Parliament.

=== Capital Gay arson attack ===
In 1987, the London paper Capital Gay's offices were targeted in an arson attack. Tony Banks MP said in the House of Commons, "On a point of order, Mr Speaker. I heard the honorable Member for Lancaster [Kellett-Bowman] say that it was quite right that Capital Gay should have been fire—", at which point he was interrupted by a point of order. Kellett-Bowman responded, "I am quite prepared to affirm that it is quite right that there should be an intolerance of evil."

== Personal life ==
She had four children with her first husband, Charles Norman Kellett, but was widowed in December 1959; her husband died in a car accident in which she suffered head injuries and memory loss.

She married Edward Bowman in June 1971; the couple served alongside each other on Camden Borough Council (as Aldermen) and as Members of the European Parliament; both took the shared surname of 'Kellett-Bowman'.

== Sources ==
- Times Guide to the House of Commons, Times Newspapers Ltd, 1955, 1966, 1992 and 1997 editions.
- Who's Who, 2007 edition
- Wikipedia article Capital Gay

European Parliament
New constituency	Member of the European Parliament for Cumbria; 1979–1984	Constituency abolished see Cumbria and Lancashire North
Parliament of the United Kingdom
Preceded by Stanley Henig	Member of Parliament for Lancaster; 1970–1997	Constituency abolished see Lancaster and Wyre
