= Holborn and St Pancras South (London County Council constituency) =

London County Council constituency

Coordinates: 51.535°N 0.135°W

- Former constituency for the London County Council

Former constituency
- Created: 1949
- Abolished: 1965
- Member(s): 3
- Created from: Holborn, St Pancras South East, St Pancras South West

Holborn and St Pancras South was a constituency used for elections to the London County Council between 1949 and the council's abolition, in 1965. The seat shared boundaries with the UK Parliament constituency of the same name.

== Councillors ==
Year	Name	Party	Name	Party	Name	Party
1949	Marion Patricia Bennett	Conservative	Albert Walker Scott	Conservative	Arthur Warne	Conservative
1952	Ronald Gilbey	Conservative	Lena Jeger	Labour	Arthur Warne	Conservative
1955	Ronald Gilbey	Conservative	Henry Norman Edwards	Conservative	Isita Clare Mansel	Conservative
1958	Louis William Bondy	Labour	Tom Braddock	Labour	Leila Campbell	Labour
1961	Louis William Bondy	Labour	Edward Kellett-Bowman	Conservative	Leila Campbell	Labour

== Election results ==
1949 London County Council election: Holborn and St Pancras South
Party	Candidate	Votes	%	±%
Conservative	Marion Patricia Bennett	12,693		
Conservative	Albert Walker Scott	12,388		
Conservative	Arthur Warne	12,167		
Labour	Lena Jeger	8,740		
Labour	David C. Webster	8,541		
Labour	R. Chinn	8,366		

1952 London County Council election: Holborn and St Pancras South
Party	Candidate	Votes	%	±%
Labour	Lena Jeger	12,274		
Conservative	Ronald Gilbey	11,271		
Conservative	Arthur Warne	11,148		
Conservative	W. J. Ridd	11,128		
Labour	J. Wellwood	10,591		
Labour	A. D. Bermel	10,079		
Liberal	G. J. Byrne	1,084		
Liberal	Isaac Joseph Hyam	814		
Liberal	S. M. P. McKenna	779		
Labour gain from Conservative		Swing		
Conservative hold		Swing		
Conservative hold		Swing		

1955 London County Council election: Holborn and St Pancras South
Party	Candidate	Votes	%	±%
Conservative	Isita Clare Mansel	9,516		
Conservative	Norman Edwards	9,471		
Conservative	Ronald Gilbey	9,454		
Labour	G. F. Lee	6,873		
Labour	J. Papworth	6,834		
Labour	Iris Brook	6,522		
Liberal	D. A. Philips	488		
Liberal	Louis Alfred de Pinna	432		
Liberal	A. C. Harley	401		
Conservative gain from Labour		Swing		
Conservative hold		Swing		
Conservative hold		Swing		

1958 London County Council election: Holborn and St Pancras South
Party	Candidate	Votes	%	±%
Labour	Leila Campbell	7,781		
Labour	Tom Braddock	7,738		
Labour	Louis Bondy	7,430		
Conservative	Norman Edwards	7,293		
Conservative	Ronald Gilbey	7,248		
Conservative	Isita Clare Mansel	7,130		
Liberal	A. S. Harley	544		
Liberal	D. A. Philips	540		
Liberal	Louis Alfred de Pinna	533		
Labour gain from Conservative		Swing		
Labour gain from Conservative		Swing		
Labour gain from Conservative		Swing		

1961 London County Council election: Holborn and St Pancras South
Party	Candidate	Votes	%	±%
Conservative	Edward Kellett-Bowman	10,035		
Labour	Leila Campbell	9,671		
Labour	Louis Bondy	9,412		
Labour	L. P. O'Connor	9,406		
Conservative	Isita Clare Mansel	9,281		
Conservative	S. Jaque	9,259		
Liberal	D. A. Philips	532		
Liberal	A. C. Harley	496		
Liberal	Louis Alfred de Pinna	488		
Conservative gain from Labour		Swing		
Labour hold		Swing		
Labour hold		Swing		
