= Hampshire Central (European Parliament constituency) =

Former European Parliament constituency

- European Parliament constituency
- Boundary within South West England (1984-1994)
- Member state: United Kingdom
- Created: 1984
- Dissolved: 1994
- MEPs: 1

Prior to its uniform adoption of proportional representation in 1999, the United Kingdom used first-past-the-post for the European elections in England, Scotland and Wales. The European Parliament constituencies used under that system were smaller than the later regional constituencies and only had one Member of the European Parliament each.

The constituency of Hampshire Central was one of them.

It consisted of the Westminster Parliament constituencies (on their 1983 boundaries) of Aldershot, Basingstoke, Eastleigh, North West Hampshire, Southampton Itchen, Southampton Test, and Winchester.

== MEPs ==
Elected	Member	Party	Notes
1984	Basil de Ferranti	Conservative	Died in office
1988 by-election	Edward Kellett-Bowman	Conservative	
1994	Constituency abolished		

== Election results ==
European Parliament election, 1984: Hampshire Central
Party	Candidate	Votes	%	±%
Conservative	Basil de Ferranti	84,086	51.7	
SDP	Francis B. Jacobs	39,265	24.2	
Labour	Mike V. Castle	39,228	24.1	
Majority		44,821	27.5	
Turnout		162,579	31.0	
Conservative win (new seat)				

1988 Hampshire Central by-election
Party	Candidate	Votes	%	±%
Conservative	Edward Kellett-Bowman	38,039	49.0	−2.7
Labour	John F. Arnold	16,597	21.4	−2.7
SLD	David Chidgey	13,392	17.3	−6.9
SDP	Earl Attlee	5,952	7.7	New
Green	Mrs. Sally J. Penton	3,603	4.6	New
Majority		21,442	27.6	+0.1
Turnout		77,583	14.1	−16.9
Conservative hold		Swing		

European Parliament election, 1989: Hampshire Central
Party	Candidate	Votes	%	±%
Conservative	Edward Kellett-Bowman	78,651	43.4	−8.3
Labour	Mrs. Angela Mawle	50,977	28.1	+4.0
Green	Mrs. Sally J. Penton	33,186	18.3	N/A
SLD	David Chidgey	18,480	10.2	−14.0
Majority		21,442	15.1	−12.4
Turnout		77,583	14.1	−16.9
Conservative hold		Swing		
