= Mark Ovenden =

British writer and journalist

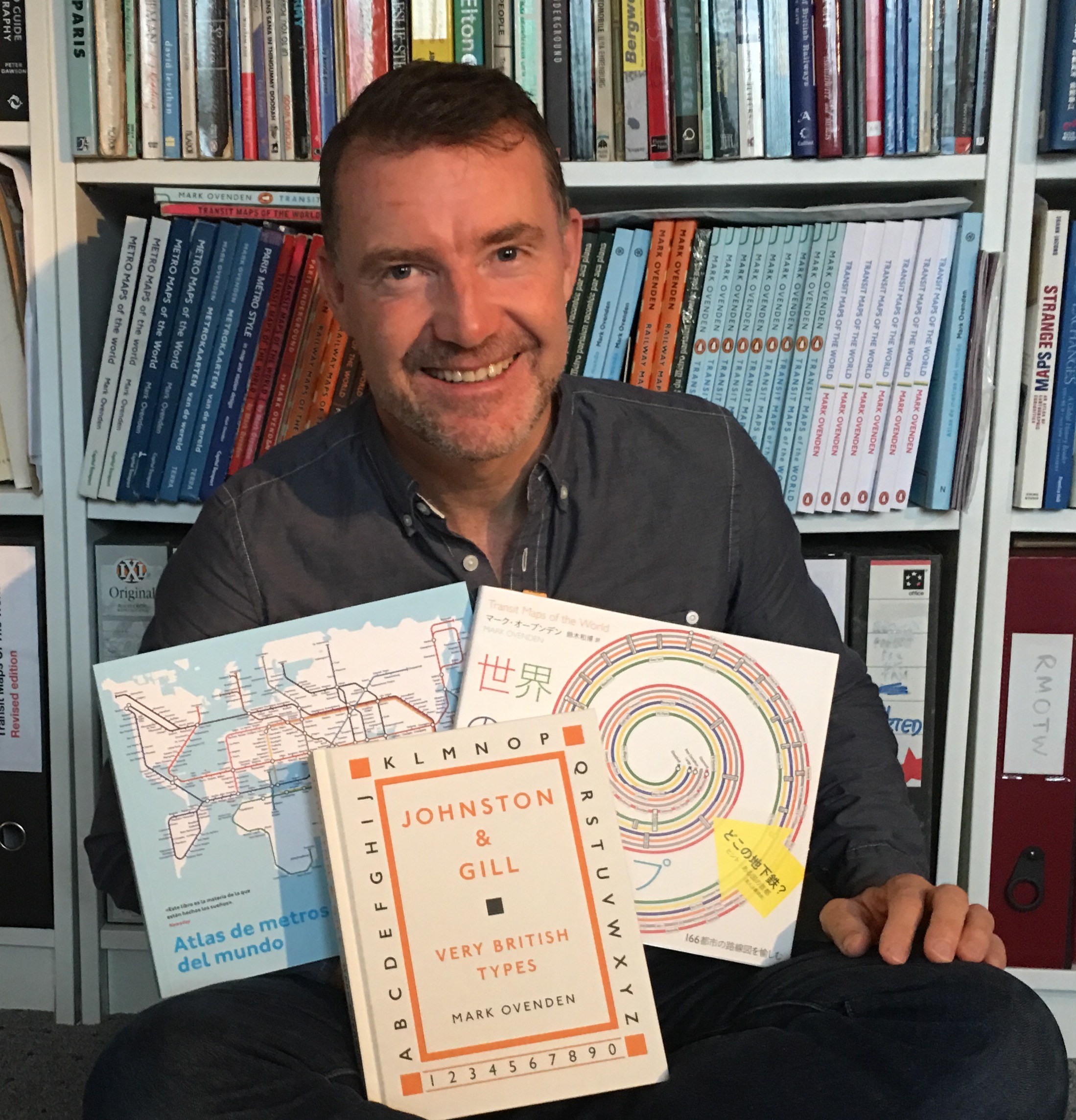
- Ovenden poses with three recent works
- Born: 20 June 1963 (age 63); London, England
- Occupations: Writer and journalist
- Writing career
- Period: 2003–present
- Subject: Rapid transit
- Website: markovenden.com

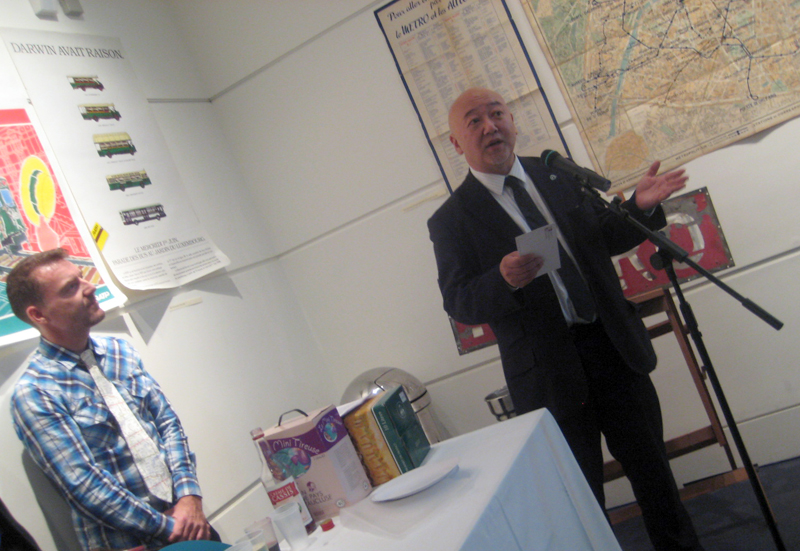
On the left / Yo Kaminagai, Paris Métro designer on the right

Mark Ovenden F.R.G.S. (born 20 June 1963) is a British broadcaster and author who specialises in the subjects of graphic design, cartography and architecture in public transport, with an emphasis on underground rapid transit.

His first book Metro Maps of the World published in 2003 is a guide to the diagrams, plans and maps of underground rapid transit system including images ranging from photos of the systems to rare and historical maps. The book was supported by the UITP, the international association of transport operators, and by the London Transport Museum. A Dutch edition was published in autumn 2006 (titled Metrokaarten van de wereld), and an American edition (entitled Transit Maps of the World) was launched on 30 October 2007 by Penguin Books. Other languages and revisions have followed.

Paris Metro Style in map and station design, was published November 2008. Endorsed by the RATP, it traces the cartographic evolution and graphic design of the Paris Metro. A revised American edition with a different title was published October 2009 and a French language edition was made in 2015.

Railway Maps of the World was published in May 2011 in the USA, a British edition was produced in September 2011. London Underground by Design was published by Penguin Books in January 2013. A celebration of the Johnston typeface centenary and 90th Anniversary of Gill Sans was published in 2016, and in July 2017 Ovenden fronted a television documentary for BBC Four on the subject of Johnston and Gill. and the skyscraper construction boom in Manchester for BBC Radio 4.

Ovenden was previously a journalist, news presenter and radio producer. He was founding editor of Due South Magazine and was half of the independent production company, 'OutSpoken', which made BBC Radio 1's 7-part lesbian and gay series Loud'n'proud in 1993. He also worked for: Kiss 102, as Programme Manager; Kiss 100, newsreader; BBC Radio Five, reporter; BBC Radio 1, producer of the Annie Nightingale show; Planet 24, researcher on GayTimeTV; BBC Two, contributor to Map Man; Ministry of Sound, Head of Radio; LBC, producer; and MTV, music programmer. At Atlantic 252 he was a producer and newsreader and co-presented a review show with Chris Coco. He also spent several years (1990–1993) working for Manchester City Council's Equality Group as a Gay Men's officer, charged with implementing their policy of non-discrimination and giving training sessions to staff countering homophobia, during the period when Section 28 was being enforced.

Ovenden has been an accredited lecturer for The Arts Society since 2019. In 2025 he graduated from the University of York with a master's degree in railway studies. Since March 2025 Ovenden presents a weekly radio show and podcast on Vectis Radio called Chatting Art, Transport, Communications History (the 'CATCH-cast').

== Works ==
- Metro Maps of the World, Capital Transport, London, 2003. ISBN 1-85414-288-7
- Metrokaarten van de Wereld, Terra Lannoo, Arnhem, 2006. ISBN 978-90-5897-583-6
- Transit Maps of the World (Paperback), Penguin, New York, 2007. ISBN 978-0-14-311265-5
- Paris Metro Style in map and station design, Capital Transport, London, November 2008. ISBN 978-1-85414-322-8
- Paris Underground: The Maps, Stations, and Design of the Metro (Paperback), Penguin, New York, October 2009. ISBN 978-0-14-311639-4
- Railway Maps of the World, Viking Adult, New York, 2011. ISBN 978-0-670-02265-6
- Great Railway Maps of the World, Particular Books, London, 2011. ISBN 978-1-84614-391-5
- Vignelli Transit Maps Paperback (with Peter B. Lloyd), RIT Cary Press, Rochester, 2012. ISBN 978-1-93336-062-1
- London Underground by Design, Penguin Books, London, 2013. ISBN 978-184614-417-2
- Transit Maps of the World Expanded and Updated (Paperback), Penguin, New York, 2015. ISBN 978-0-14312-849-6
- Transit Maps of the World Expanded and Updated (Paperback), Particular Books, London, 2015. ISBN 978-0-14198-144-4
- Histoire Du Métro Parisien Racontée Par Ses Plans (l') (with Julian Pepinster) (Paperback), La Vie Du Rail, Paris, 2015. ISBN 978-2-37062-015-6
- 世界の美しい地下鉄マップ (Paperback), Nikkei National Geographic, Tokyo, 2016. ISBN 978-4-86313-360-0
- Atlas de metros del mundo, CaptainSwing, Madrid, 2016. ISBN 978-84-16830-06-0
- Johnston & Gill: Very British Types, Lund Humphries, London, 2016, ISBN 978-1-84822-176-5
- Metrolink: The First 25 Years, Rails Publishing, London, 2017. ISBN 978-1-85414-415-7
- London Underground Architecture & Design Map, Blue Crow Media, London, 2017, ISBN 978-1-912018-66-6
- Airline Maps: A Century of Art and Design (with Maxwell Roberts), Penguin Random House, New York, 2019. ISBN 978-0-14313-407-7
- Paris Metro Architecture & Design Map, Blue Crow Media, London, 2019 ISBN 978-1-91201-852-9
- Underground Cities: Mapping the tunnels, transits and networks of our cities. Frances Lincoln, London, 2020. ISBN 978-1-78131-893-5
- Iconic Transit Maps - The World's Best Designs, Prestel Publishing, London, 2024. ISBN 978-3-79138-025-4
- Histoire Du Métro Parisien Racontée Par Ses Plans (l'), édition enrichie (with Julian Pepinster) (Paperback), La Vie Du Rail, Paris, 2025. ISBN 978-2-37062-137-5
- The Untold Railway Stories, edited by Monisha Rajesh, Duckworth Books, London, 2025. ISBN 978-1-91461-395-1
- Mapping Britain's Railways - The Design History of a Nation on Track, with Andrew Smithers, British Library Publishing, London, 2026. ISBN 9780712355896
