= Bryan Cowgill =

British television executive

- Born: George Bryan Cowgill; 27 May 1927; Clitheroe, Lancashire, England
- Died: 14 July 2008 (aged 81); Stratford-upon-Avon, Warwickshire, England
- Education: Clitheroe Royal Grammar School
- Employer(s): BBC; Thames Television
- Title: Head of Sport for BBC Television (1963–1973); Controller of BBC1 (1974–1977); Managing Director of Thames Television (1977–1985)
- Children: 4

George Bryan Cowgill (27 May 1927 – 14 July 2008) was an English television executive and producer. He began as a copy boy with the Lancashire Evening Post in Preston before working as an editor of the weekly newspaper Clitherone Advertiser and Times in Clitheroe. At the BBC, he was Head of Sport for BBC Television from 1963 to 1973, Controller of BBC1 from 1974 to 1977, and Managing Director of Thames Television from 1977 to 1985. Cowgill also worked as deputy chairman of Mirror Group Newspapers. He was also chairman of United Press International Television News and a director of Independent Television News (ITN). Cowgill was a fellow of the Royal Television Society.

== Early life ==
Cowgill was born in Clitheroe, Lancashire on 27 May 1927, the son of the printer and stationer John Clifford Cowgill and his wife Ada Gertrude (née Hartley). He had a brother. Cowgill went to Pendle Primary School. Between 1938 and 1942, He attended Clitheroe Royal Grammar School and did not gain many qualifications. After leaving school at age 15, Cowgill became a copy boy with the Lancashire Evening Post in Preston, where his grandfather was a printer. In 1943, he joined the Royal Marines, and during the next four years he saw service in Southeast Asia in which he became the 3rd Royal Marines Commando's youngest commissioned officer and rose to the rank of lieutenant.

== Career ==
After Cowgill was demobbed in 1947, he rejoined the Evening Post as a reporter and feature writer, and then from 1950 to 1955 he edited the local weekly paper Clitherone Advertiser and Times in Clitheroe. He joined the BBC on 22 September 1955 as a trainee production assistant in the corporation's Outside Broadcasting Department. In 1957, Cowgill was asked by the BBC's director of outside broadcasting (television) Peter Dimmock to produce the midweek sports magazine programme Sportsview.

In 1958, after directing coverage of athletics at the 1958 British Empire and Commonwealth Games in Cardiff, Cowgill and editor Paul Fox devised the Saturday afternoon sports programme Grandstand, which was an immediate success and ran until 2007. In March 1963, he was promoted to Head of Sport in the BBC Television outside broadcasts group. In this capacity, he introduced the weekly football highlights programme Match of the Day in 1964, Sportsnight in 1968 and BBC2's Sunday cricket coverage. During his tenure the BBC covered an increasing number of ambitious sporting events, including organising extensive coverage as host broadcaster of the 1966 World Cup and showing coverage live by satellite from Mexico of both the 1968 Summer Olympics and 1970 World Cup and the 1972 Summer Olympics from West Germany. His work won him three BAFTAs for the 1960 Summer Olympics, the 1966 World Cup and the 1968 Summer Olympics. In October 1969, Cowgill became head of a new department that was formed by the amalgamation of the television events and television sports departments that began in 1970. Upon its introduction at the 1966 World Cup, he coined the term "Action Replay" for replaying of major events of a sporting event,

In January 1972, Cowgill appeared on the television viewer and feedback programme Talkback. In April 1974, after a decade in charge of the sports department of BBC Television, Cowgill was promoted to Controller of BBC1, the corporation's premier television network, handling its programming and finances. He succeeded Fox, who moved to ITV. His commissions included Multi-Coloured Swap Shop the prison comedy Porridge, the sitcoms The Good Life and The Fall and Rise of Reginald Perrin, Jim'll Fix It and dramas such as When the Boat Comes In and All Creatures Great and Small. Cowgill moved Play For Today and Omnibus, rescheduled the American police series Kojak and introduced Starsky & Hutch to British audiences.

In May 1977, Cowgill was named the director of news and current affairs for radio and television, with a place on the Board of Governors of the BBC effective on 1 October after the board approved the creation of the post. However, he rejected the offer made to him by Ian Trethowan, the Director-General of the BBC, and instead accepted an offer to leave the BBC after more than 20 years to join Thames Television as Managing Director from 3 October, partly due to an increase in salary. Cowgill lured Morecambe and Wise and Mike Yarwood away from the BBC, and oversaw drama programmes such as Rumpole of the Bailey, Minder, A Voyage Round My Father, Edward & Mrs. Simpson and The Bill. He commissioned the Rumpole creator John Mortimer to write the 13-part series Paradise Postponed. He also oversaw Danger Mouse, The Wind in the Willows and a series on the silent movie era, The Silent Years. Cowgill oversaw the development of Thames' companies Euston Films, its film-making subsidiary and the children's animated television maker Cosgrove Hall Productions. He was chairman of United Press International Television News and a director of Independent Television News (ITN).

In 1984, Cowgill, in a foretaste of changes to come within the industry, successfully resisted demands by the Association of Cinematograph, Television and Allied Technicians (ACTT) union for additional payments to use new technology, by maintaining a reduced service while the other ITV contractors met demands for a 20% rise in pay. During Cowgill's tenure at Thames Television he tried to acquire the popular 1980s American soap opera Dallas, which had previously been associated with the BBC, abandoning a gentleman's agreement not to poach purchased programming. Other ITV companies refused to show Dallas if Thames retained it, and this led to Cowgill's resignation on 12 July 1985 at the age of 58. In December, Cowgill was appointed deputy chairman of Mirror Group Newspapers with responsibility for cable and satellite television, radio and video from 1 January 1986. In 1986, he made an appearance on Tyne-Tees Television networked programme Face The Press. Cowgill also worked for the sports agent Mark McCormack's IMGsports management company in its bid to set up a sports channel and consulted with British Satellite Broadcasting.

In June 2006, Cowgill said that "in the context of more than 200 channels" he was in favour of the abolition of the television licence that finances the BBC. His autobiography, Mr Action Replay, was written with Dale le Vack and published in 2006.

== Personal life ==
He was known as "Ginger" for his hair colour and temperament. Cowgill was married twice. His first marriage was to the shop assistant Doreen Thompson, which produced two children and ended in divorce. The second marriage was to the BBC television secretary Jennifer Elizabeth (Jenny) Baker. There were two children of that marriage. He was made a fellow of the Royal Television Society in May 1984. Cowgill died in Stratford-upon-Avon, Warwickshire of an heart attack on 14 July 2008.

Media offices
Preceded by Paul Fox	Controller of BBC1; 1974–1977	Succeeded by Bill Cotton
