= Simon Edge =

British novelist and journalist

- Born: 25 December 1964 (age 61); Chester, England
- Occupations: Novelist and journalist
- Known for: Last editor of Capital Gay; Senior contributing editor of Attitude
- Notable work: The Hopkins Conundrum (2017); The End of the World is Flat (2021)
- Website: www.simon-edge.com

Simon John Edge (born 25 December 1964 in Chester, England) is a British novelist, editor and journalist.

== Education ==
Educated at the King's School, Chester, he went on to receive a master's degree in philosophy from St Catharine's College, Cambridge and has a master's degree in creative writing from City University, where he also taught as a visiting lecturer.

== Career ==
He got his first job in journalism at the Middle East business magazine MEED and went on to be the final editor of Capital Gay. He was on staff at the London Evening Standard and joined the Daily Express in 1999, where he spent many years as a feature writer and theatre critic. He is a former senior contributing editor of Attitude magazine, and is now a senior editor at Eye Books.

== Books ==
He is the author of six satirical novels. Three of them – The Hopkins Conundrum, A Right Royal Face-Off and Anyone for Edmund? – have a biographical element, focusing on Gerard Manley Hopkins, Thomas Gainsborough and Edmund the Martyr, respectively.

The Hopkins Conundrum was described by The Spectator as "a pleasurable literary thriller [in which] Edge wears his Hopkins learning lightly" and by the Daily Express as "enjoyable on every level". It was longlisted for the Waverton Good Read Award 2017–18. A Right Royal Face-Off was described by Gainsborough authority Hugh Belsey as "beguiling" and "beautifully managed and brilliantly resolved". The i newspaper said of Anyone for Edmund?: "Edge's sharp-edged political comedy is guaranteed to have you laughing out loud."

His most recent novels, The End of the World is Flat and In the Beginning, satirise the transgender rights movement. The Times called The End of the World is Flat "nifty, often snort-inducingly funny satire". Writing in The Critic, Josephine Bartosch described In the Beginning as "a pacy satire" and "a stylish retelling of the Maya Forstater tribunal". Also in The Critic, Helen Dale has written of his work: "Edge is not simply holding social foibles and cod science up to ridicule. He's also doing what Aristophanes thought poets should do in circumstances like these: save the city from itself."

He is also the author of With Friends Like These, a critique of the Left's record on gay rights.

== Personal life ==
Edge was married to Ezio Alessandroni, a former Roman Catholic priest, from 2014 until the latter's death from cancer in March 2017. He lives in Suffolk.

== Bibliography ==
=== Non-fiction ===
- Yemen: Arabian Enigma (1992), MEED
- With Friends Like These: Marxism and Gay Politics (1995), Cassell

=== Fiction ===
- The Hopkins Conundrum (2017), Lightning
- The Hurtle of Hell (2018), Lightning
- A Right Royal Face-Off (2019), Lightning
- Anyone for Edmund? (2020), Lightning
- The End of the World is Flat (2021), Lightning
- In the Beginning (2023), Lightning
