= Nigel Wrench =

British radio presenter and reporter

- Born: Stephen Wrench
- Occupations: Radio presenter, Reporter
- Known for: Interviewing Banksy; HIV activism

Stephen Wrench, known professionally as Nigel Wrench, is a British radio presenter and reporter best known for interviewing the artist known as Banksy, and for being the only person to present a live BBC programme while living with an AIDS diagnosis.

== Career ==
=== South Africa ===
Wrench was a radio reporter in the apartheid townships for the Canadian Broadcasting Corporation, National Public Radio, the Australian Broadcasting Corporation and the UK-based Independent Radio News and London Broadcasting Company.

Like many other journalists, he experienced police harassment. In December 1985, he was detained when reporting the illegal return of Winnie Mandela to Soweto.

Reporting on demonstrations in Windhoek, Namibia, in September 1988, he was beaten up by police.

=== BBC ===
In 1989 Wrench joined the BBC as a London-based reporter for the Today programme. In 1990, he was at the prison gates when Nelson Mandela walked free. Wrench reported from a wide variety of other locations for BBC Radio including Jerusalem, St Petersburg, Bucharest, Kyiv and Bosnia.

Wrench was a founding co-host of Out This Week, an LGBT+ news programme on BBC Radio 5 Live for which he won a Sony Radio Award. He later won a New York Radio Award for his 1998 Radio 4 documentary Aids and Me, while also regularly co-presenting the Radio 4 programme PM.

=== Banksy interview ===
Wrench is best known, however, for interviewing the artist known as Banksy on "PM" at the opening of "Turf War", the first Banksy exhibition in London in 2003.

In November 2023, Wrench's full interview with Banksy was released by the BBC in which Banksy reveals his first name as "Robbie", in a podcast which attracted worldwide attention.

=== Archival work ===
In February 2015 Wrench released ZA86, a limited-edition cassette, through specialist label The Tapeworm. A sleeve note describes it as: "apartheid South Africa, 1986, through the headphones of a young radio reporter". A review in The Quietus said: "Few journalists have quite so intimately captured the essence of their era's great moral panics as Nigel Wrench".

Wrench's second cassette for Tapeworm, ZA87, a piece of audio verité documenting a political funeral in Soweto in 1987, was released in March 2021.

Switch Off That Machine, released in May 2025, is a third collection of archive recordings intended, a sleeve note says, as “a warning for the present and the future, from the past of apartheid South Africa", digitally free on Bandcamp and as a limited edition compact disc. Bandcamp rated "Switch Off That Machine" as one of 'The Best Field Recordings of May 2025'.

== HIV activism ==
Wrench came out as HIV-positive in 1994, in a speech while accepting his Sony Radio Award. He wrote extensively about living with HIV and AIDS, including a regular column for the Pink Paper and made a television documentary called From Russia With Love for BBC3 in 2003. He remains the only broadcaster with a declared AIDS diagnosis to broadcast a live BBC Radio programme, after he returned from a brush with death from PCP, an AIDS-related pneumonia, to present “PM” in 1996.
