= Loud'n'proud =

Series on BBC Radio 1

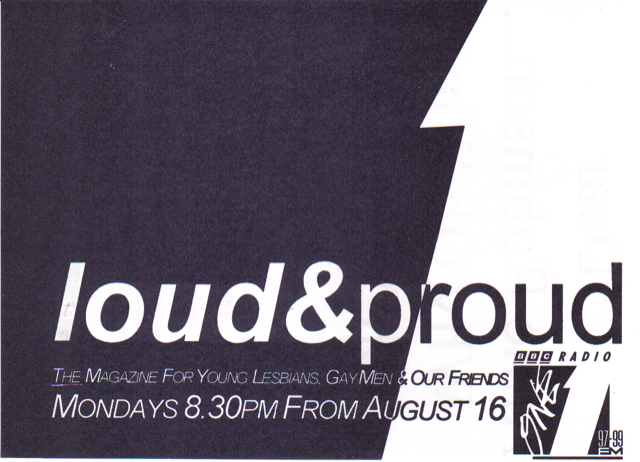
Made by OutSpoken Productions to promote the first series

loud & proud is a series on BBC Radio 1 aimed at young lesbians and gay men and their friends. It was presented by DJ Paulette and broadcast weekly in 1993.

It was made by OutSpoken Productions, an independent production company based in Manchester, run by Christopher Kelly and Mark Ovenden. Although only six programmes (and a Christmas special) were commissioned, it was the first series for gay people on a national UK radio network and was the first radio series in the world to target young gay people.

Such was the prevailing level of homophobia at the time that Conservative Member of Parliament Peter Butler was reported in the press as saying that "The BBC have gone completely out of control. They are following their own agenda. We should cancel their licence fee".

The pilot of the series was first produced by OutSpoken during early 1992 (in the studios of Ocean Sound), with celebrity gay footballer Justin Fashanu as the presenter. It was initially submitted to BBC Radio Five but turned down in May 1992.

When the series began on Radio 1 the following year (16 August 1993), its success and generally favourable press coverage (for example in The Guardian called the programme "an impressive example of public service broadcasting"), encouraged the network to cover London's Gay Pride event for the first time the following year. Those reports into the general days output, also produced by OutSpoken Productions and fronted by Kevin Greening led to Radio 1 becoming a regular fixture at Gay Pride events for several years.

Also, the following year, BBC Radio 5 Live began broadcasting a weekly programme for the LGBTQ community called Out This Week, which aired on that network until the end of the decade.

The term "loud and proud" was also used in 2017 by BBC 6 Music for a celebration of 50 years since the "first steps towards legalising sexual freedom"
