= Ministry of Sound Radio =

British radio station

Coordinates: 51°29′51″N 0°5′58″W

- United Kingdom

History
- First air date: 1999
- Last air date: 2016

Links
- Website: www.ministryofsound.com/radio

The Ministry of Sound Radio (MoS) began service as a UK-based radio station operating since 1999. It was accessible on the Ministry of Sound website as streaming audio until March 2016.

MoS radio's DJs included: DJ Bailey, X-Press 2, Hed Kandi residents Andy Norman and Krystal Roxx, Markus Schulz, DJ Storm, Hospital Records, Matt Darey, Above and Beyond, Todd Edwards, and Mark Knight.

== History ==
The station can trace its history back to a one-hour-long, syndicated radio programme called the "Ministry of Sound Dance Party" which was produced in a tiny studio in the MoS offices using Pro Tools from 1996, by Robert Sharp. He was joined by Gavin Kingsley from 1997, who also sourced DJ mixes which ended up as free CDs on the front of Ministry magazine.

At its height during the late 1990s, the dance party appeared on over 50 radio stations in 38 countries worldwide. The syndication of the show spurred Ministry manager James Bethel to turn the programme into a rolling audio stream which was available on the MoS website from 1998. Gradually older shows and mixes were added to the stream.

== DAB services ==
=== Greater London DAB service ===
Following an independent report, commissioned by Bethel, on the future of MoS radio services, he led an application for a Digital audio broadcasting (DAB) licence for a full-scale radio station. The service was included as part of an application by a consortium called Switch Digital which proposed eight other services (including Heart 106.2, BBC London Live and Jazz FM). There were two other consortia bidding for the licence, but Switch won the Greater London 2 (12A frequency) DAB licence from the then Radio Authority in 1999 to cover an area which included London and most of the Home Counties with ten transmitters.

Bethel recruited the reports authors David Dunne (formerly Head of Music at MTV UK and Kiss 102) and Mark Ovenden (who had worked with Dunne at the same places and was also a former BBC Radio 1 producer). The small team of Sharp, Kingsley, Dunne and Ovenden began ripping thousands of dance tracks into the system, making a station identity and planning a full schedule. Another member of staff hired that year was Wendy Marr. Charlotte Coker joined later, as did Alexander Bartelemy, John Askew, Drew Erskine, Brian Cheetham and Iam Fulton (temporary).

Ministry of Sound Radio began test transmissions from a single PC in Bethel's office during the summer of 2000, while a full studio was constructed opposite the MoS reception desk. The station was also simulcast on the web, where at one point, it became the most listened to dance radio stream and eighth most listened to of any radio stream in the world (December 2001).

The station moved to live programming when the studio was ready, from 21 September 2000. The station was officially launched by Paul Oakenfold with a live mix from inside the club itself. Despite the minuscule audience listening on digital radio at that point, London had 50 DAB stations, Dunne insisted on live DJs being put on air daily from 16:00 to 20:00, with live broadcasts from inside the Ministry club every Sunday morning from 02:00 to 06:00.

The music policy was almost exclusively house–trance–hard house-based, as this style of music was primarily what the club was known for, and R'n'B was already being well-covered on the broadcast band in London. (There was only one regular soul/R'n'B programme: Bobby & Steve's 'Soul Heaven'). When no live programmes were on, the automated Maestro system played out back-to-back music from the playlist or pre-recorded programmes.

During July and August 2000, the station was broadcast live every night from a makeshift studio built into the Ministry's hotel in Ibiza.

On 31 December 2000, Ministry held a New Year's Eve party at the Millennium Dome. The radio station ran a nine-hour, live, outside broadcast from the event, relaying the main dancefloor across London and to the world online.

Such a commitment to a DAB-only radio service was considered a major achievement in the industry and was honoured in 2002, when the station was awarded Gold as Digital Radio Station of the year at the InCar Magazine awards.

In 2001 the station also became the first UK DAB-only station to generate income from a paid-for commercial.

=== Central Scotland DAB service ===
The success of the first feed then led Switch Digital to add Ministry of Sound Radio to its application, for the next DAB service in Central Scotland. Switch won this licence, and from June 2001, it went live across Central Scotland, with a launch party broadcast live from a club in Glasgow. Though at first the rest of the programming was a direct feed of the London service, and no local programming was made, there were plans to augment with local material at a later date.

=== Closure ===
The DAB service was closed in December 2002. The London frequency was taken over by Galaxy FM.

=== Hardware ===
There have been at least two pieces of audio hardware produced with the MoS branding which have been capable of receiving DAB audio broadcasts (despite the station coming off DAB in 2002).

== Central London RSL ==
Dunne and Ovenden led an application for a temporary Restricted Service Licence (RSL) on the FM band in Central London. The Radio Authority awarded this in early 2001. The station went on air 1 October 2001, for a 28-day period on 87.7 MHz in a roughly 3-mile radius (5 km) around the club at Elephant and Castle.

The low-powered signal was supposed to cover a small part of south and central London, but although there were also some pirate stations operating in the city on the same frequency at the time, the MOSR signal was picked up by DXers.

In a turn of events, 40 MoS staff were made redundant during October 2001, while the RSL was still on air, including several of the leading people who had put the RSL package together (ex: Ryan Diedericks, Ryan D).

== Sky Digital ==
In 2005 Ministry of Sound Radio, under the then Head of Radio Robert Sharp, made a short-lived appearance on the Sky Digital platform (Channel 0198).

== Streaming ==
From March 2007, the station expanded further, launching two on-demand channels offering non-stop chill-out and underground sessions. It also launched a gadget for Vista, described as the most advanced Vista gadget in the world.

By April 2010, the live station stream was available via the free iPhone app. Also, it was one of the first radio stations available as an app for Apple's iPad.
