= Leila Campbell =

British politician

Leila Campbell (née Jaffe; 10 August 1911 – 2 October 1993) was a British Labour party politician. She was a former London County Council, Greater London Council and Inner London Education Authority member, and chairman of the Hampstead Theatre Board.

== Early life ==
Campbell was born on 10 August 1911 in Birkenhead, Cheshire to parents Rebecca (née Neiman, 1879–1965) and Myer Jaffe (1883–1961). She was educated at the Belvedere school, Liverpool, trained to be an art teacher and worked as a dress designer and cutter. During the early 1930s the family lived at 41 Parkfield Road, Toxteth, Liverpool and by 1939, they were living at 5 Devonshire Road, Toxteth.

== Career ==
Campbell was active in the Labour Party from the 1930s. At the 1958 London County Council election, she was elected in Holborn and St Pancras South, serving until 1964, when it was replaced by the Greater London Council. On the new body, Campbell represented Camden and also served on Hampstead Borough Council and its successor, Camden London Borough Council, in the Priory ward. She was an alderman on the council from 1971 to 1978.

Campbell devoted much of her time to the Inner London Education Authority, becoming chair of the body in 1977, having served as vice-chair since 1967. She left the role in 1978, and then served on the board of the Hampstead Theatre, and was its chair from 1985 until a few weeks before her death. During her time on the board, she oversaw the theatre's relocation from Hampstead to a new site in Swiss Cottage.

Campbell was a particular supporter of the Central School of Speech and Drama. She served as a governor for several schools: Frank Barnes school for the deaf, the Franklin Roosevelt school for the disabled and the Royal Free Hospital school.

== Personal life and death ==
Campbell moved from Liverpool to South Hill Park, Belsize Park, London. In 1940, she married Andrew Campbell, an election agent for the Labour party, in Kensington, London. The couple had one daughter, lived in Belsize Park, and remained married until the death of her husband in 1968. Her recreations were cooking, theatre, opera and jazz. She would often see a production three times, and after the first occasion invariably murmuring, "That was wonderful, now I have to go away and think about it". Campbell died from cancer on 2 October 1993 at her home in Belsize Park, London, aged 82. Her funeral was held on 11 October 1993 at Golders Green Crematorium.

In 2007, a plaque was erected at Hampstead Theatre in Campbell's honour, reading "This corner of Hampstead Theatre is dedicated to Leila Campbell (1911–1993), Chair and Board member of Hampstead Theatre (1978–1991). Remembered with gratitude for her commitment to this theatre and the local area."
