= Ross Eccles =

English artist and painter

- Paris (1994)
- Born: 13 November 1937 (age 88); Blackburn, England
- Known for: Acrylic painting, watercolor painting, Invention

Ross Eccles (born 13 November 1937) is a contemporary English artist and painter. He has been based in Dublin, Ireland since 1971, and exhibits there regularly. He has also exhibited his work in the UK, France and the US.

== Life and work ==
Ross Eccles was born in Blackburn, England in 1937 . He was educated at Clitheroe Royal Grammar School and later studied Architecture at the Birmingham School of Architecture. He practiced as an architect for 30 years, first in England and then in Canada, before settling in Ireland where he ran his own practice up until 1992. In 1992 he retired from Architecture in order to devote himself to art on a full-time basis.

Ross’s often twisted, abstract style of painting is a reaction to the rigidity and structure that he faced as an architect. His architectural background has undoubtedly influenced his artworks and his subjects frequently include familiar architectural landmarks, although these are painted in an entirely new light that reflects the artist’s own vision, with bold colours and broken lines. His paintings are created to provide a fresh perspective on otherwise mundane subjects and to free the viewer from the confinements and limitations of everyday existence.

Ross often gives demonstrations to school students in the hope that he can get them to see the world around them in a new way and change their mindset in regards to life and art. He believes that conventional teaching “moulds people into similar patterns and suppresses natural individuality”.

His early work and style was influenced by his architectural training and was in the form of architectural sketches and watercolours. In recent years Ross’s style has become looser and his brushstrokes more obvious and less defined as he works more and more with acrylic paint. There is a lot of movement within his works and an emphasis on the importance of colour and light over line. Rather than recreating the subject precisely he wants to re-create the sense of what the eye captures when it looks at the subject and merge that with an element of fantasy to create a fresh vision of an everyday subject matter. His main influences include the Surrealists, the Cubists and the Impressionists .
