= Tottenham (electoral division) =

Electoral division in Greater London, 1973–1986

- Former electoral division for the Greater London Council
- District: Haringey
- Electorate: 48,434 (1973); 45,569 (1977); 46,293 (1981); 43,013 (1983)
- Major settlements: Tottenham
- Area: 754 hectares (7.54 km^{2})

Former electoral division
- Created: 1973
- Abolished: 1986
- Member: 1
- Created from: Haringey

Tottenham was an electoral division for the purposes of elections to the Greater London Council. The constituency elected one councillor for a four-year term in 1973, 1977 and 1981, with the final term extended for an extra year ahead of the abolition of the Greater London Council.

== History ==
It was planned to use the same boundaries as the Westminster Parliament constituencies for election of councillors to the Greater London Council (GLC), as had been the practice for elections to the predecessor London County Council, but those that existed in 1965 crossed the Greater London boundary. Until new constituencies could be settled, the 32 London boroughs were used as electoral areas. The London Borough of Haringey formed the Haringey electoral division. This was used for the Greater London Council elections in 1964, 1967 and 1970.

The new constituencies were settled following the Second Periodic Review of Westminster constituencies and the new electoral division matched the boundaries of the Tottenham parliamentary constituency.

It covered an area of 754 hectares (7.54 km^{2}).

== Elections ==
The Tottenham constituency was used for the Greater London Council elections in 1973, 1977 and 1981. One councillor was elected at each election using first-past-the-post voting.

=== 1973 election ===
The fourth election to the GLC (and first using revised boundaries) was held on 12 April 1973. The electorate was 48,434 and one Labour Party councillor was elected. The turnout was 29.8%. The councillor was elected for a three-year term. This was extended for an extra year in 1976 when the electoral cycle was switched to four-yearly.

1973 Greater London Council election: Tottenham
Party	Candidate	Votes	%	±%
Labour	Andrew Robert McIntosh	8,043	55.73	
Conservative	John Antony Croft	3,360	23.27	
National Independence	Michael Paul Coney	2,924	20.25	
Socialist (GB)	Mrs A Young	109	0.76	
Turnout				
Labour win (new seat)				

=== 1977 election ===
The fifth election to the GLC (and second using revised boundaries) was held on 5 May 1977. The electorate was 45,569 and one Labour Party councillor was elected. The turnout was 35.3%. The councillor was elected for a four-year term.

1977 Greater London Council election: Tottenham
Party	Candidate	Votes	%	±%
Labour	Andrew Robert McIntosh	7,543	46.85	
Conservative	P. E. Hitchens	5,845	36.31	
National Front	PG Holden	1,628	10.11	
Liberal	Katherine Alexander	756	4.69	
National Party	Miss PI Goldfield	333	2.07	
Turnout				
Labour hold		Swing		

=== 1981 election ===
The sixth and final election to the GLC (and third using revised boundaries) was held on 7 May 1981. The electorate was 46,293 and one Labour Party councillor was elected. The turnout was 36.0%. The councillor was elected for a four-year term, extended by an extra year by the Local Government (Interim Provisions) Act 1984, ahead of the abolition of the council.

1981 Greater London Council election: Tottenham
Party	Candidate	Votes	%	±%
Labour	Andrew Robert McIntosh	10,775	64.72	
Conservative	Alan Thomas Amos	3,802	22.83	
Liberal	Katherine Alexander	1,605	9.64	
Constitutional Movement	Alexander Clark	277	1.66	
Workers Revolutionary	Richard D. Goldstein	189	1.14	
Turnout				
Labour hold		Swing		

=== 1983 by-election ===
A by-election was held on 5 May 1983, following the resignation of Andrew Robert McIntosh. The electorate was 43,013 and one Labour Party councillor was elected. The turnout was 39.9%.

Tottenham by-election, 1983
Party	Candidate	Votes	%	±%
Labour	Jennifer Fletcher	8,984	52.37	
Conservative	Peter L. Murphy	5,835	34.01	
Alliance	Alexander S. C. L'Estrange	2,089	12.18	
National Front	John B. Donegan	244	1.42	
Turnout				
Labour hold		Swing		
