= Andrew McIntosh, Baron McIntosh of Haringey =

British Labour politician

The Right Honourable The Lord McIntosh of Haringey PC
- Speaking in the Lords chamber, March 2010

Deputy Chief Whip of the House of Lords Captain of the Yeomen of the Guard
- In office 3 May 1997 – 13 June 2003
- Prime Minister: Tony Blair
- Preceded by: The Lord Chesham
- Succeeded by: The Lord Davies of Oldham

Member of the House of Lords
- Lord Temporal
- Life peerage 17 January 1983 – 27 August 2010

Leader of the Greater London Council Labour group
- In office 1980 – 8 May 1981
- Preceded by: Reg Goodwin
- Succeeded by: Ken Livingstone

Greater London Councillor for Tottenham
- In office 13 April 1973 – 1 March 1983
- Preceded by: New ward
- Succeeded by: Jennifer Fletcher

Personal details
- Born: Andrew Robert McIntosh; 30 April 1933 London, England
- Died: 27 August 2010 (aged 77) London, England
- Party: Labour
- Spouse: Naomi Sargant (m. 1962; died 2006)
- Children: 2

Andrew Robert McIntosh, Baron McIntosh of Haringey, PC (30 April 1933 – 27 August 2010) was a British Labour politician and last elected Principal of the Working Men's College.

== Personal life ==
McIntosh was born at the Royal Free Hospital in Hampstead on 30 April 1933. He was educated at Haberdasher Aske's Hampstead School, the Royal Grammar School, High Wycombe, Jesus College, Oxford and Ohio State University.

In 1962, McIntosh married Naomi Sargant, an academic, and they were together until her death in 2006. They had two sons, and McIntosh became a stepfather to her son from a prior marriage.

McIntosh divided his time between a home in Highgate, London, and one in the Provence region of France. On 27 August 2010, he died from non-Hodgkin lymphoma at his home in Highgate, aged 77. He was cremated, and his ashes were buried at Highgate Cemetery.

== Politics ==
He served as a councillor in the London Borough of Haringey (1964–68). He represented Tottenham on the Greater London Council (1973–83). When Labour won control of the GLC in 1981, McIntosh was leader of the Labour group. A centrist, McIntosh narrowly beat left-winger Ken Livingstone for the leadership. However, the day after Labour won a small majority, he was ousted and Livingstone voted leader of the Labour Group and of the GLC in his place by 30 to 20.

He was raised to the peerage as a life peer on 17 January 1983 as Baron McIntosh of Haringey of Haringey in Greater London. He served as a whip and a culture spokesman in the House of Lords. He was sworn in as a member of the Privy Council in 2002.

Andrew McIntosh was the UK's Minister for the Media and Heritage at the Department for Culture, Media and Sport from 2003 to 2005. His responsibilities included broadcasting and press regulation, heritage and architecture, libraries, and gambling regulation. He was also spokesman in the House of Lords for HM Treasury from 1997 to 2005.

In September 2005, he became a member of the Parliamentary Assembly of the Council of Europe sitting as Chairman of the Assembly's Committee on Culture, Science and Education from January 2010 and chairman of its Sub-Committee on the Media from 2008 to 2009.

Following the passing of a resolution on "Threats to the lives and freedom of expression of journalists" on 27 January 2007 the Council of Europe appointed him its rapporteur on media freedom.

McIntosh became an Honorary Associate of the National Secular Society, a Distinguished Supporter of the British Humanist Association and vice-chair of the All Party Parliamentary Humanist Group.

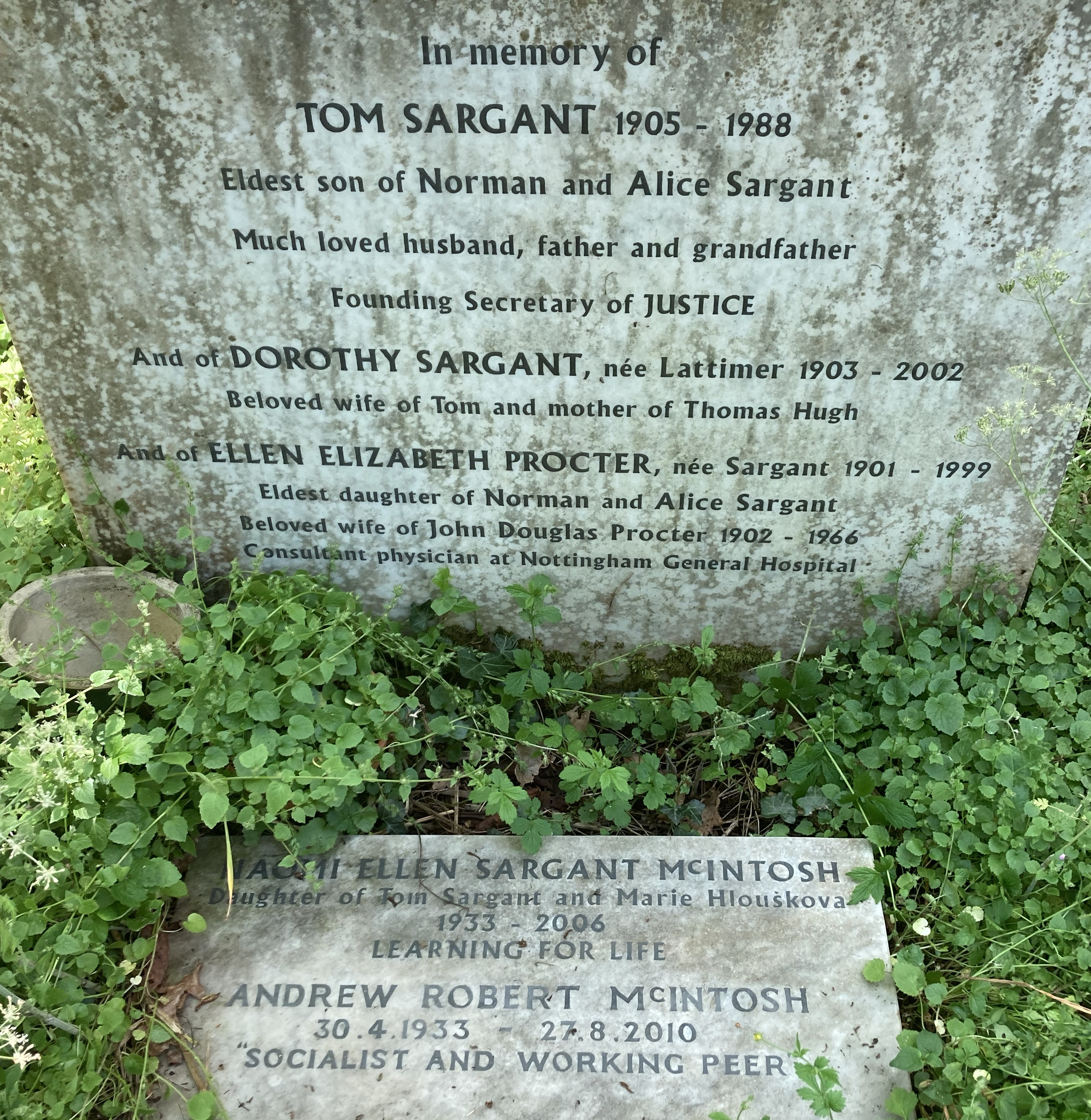
Grave of Andrew and Naomi McIntosh in Highgate Cemetery

== Social and market research ==
McIntosh was a market researcher at Gallup poll (1957–61), Hoover Ltd (1961–63), and Osram (GEC) Ltd (1963–65).

He founded IFF Research (originally named Industrial Facts & Forecasting) in 1965 and was its managing director between 1965 and 1981. He edited the journal of the Market Research Society (MRS; 1963–1967), became MRS chairman (1972–1973), and then its president (1995–1998).

Party political offices
Preceded by Reg Goodwin	Leader of the Labour Party on the Greater London Council; 1980–1981	Succeeded by Ken Livingstone
Preceded by Tessa Blackstone	Chair of the Fabian Society; 1985 – 1986	Succeeded by Austin Mitchell
Political offices
Preceded by The Lord Chesham	Captain of the Yeomen of the Guard; 1997–2003	Succeeded by The Lord Davies of Oldham
