= Ronald Gilbey =

British figure skater, businessman and politician

Alfred Ronald Dashwood Gilbey (20 February 1911 – 31 July 1977) was a British figure skater, businessman and politician.

The son of Colonel Alfred Gilbey and his wife Beatrice née Holland, he was educated at Westminster School. His father was a director of W & A Gilbey, wine and spirit merchants, co-founded by his grandfather and great uncle.

Gilbey was a keen sportsman and figure skater, winning the Amateur Figure Skating Championship at Alexandra Palace, London, in 1930 and 1931, and the International Ice Figure Skating Championship in St Moritz, Switzerland, in 1931. He continued his association with winter sports throughout his life as a member of the British Olympic Council and as chairman of the National Ice Skating Association from 1966 - 1976.

During the Second World War he served in the Royal Air Force.

Following the war, he entered politics in London, as a member of the Conservative Party. He was a member of Westminster City Council from 1945 to 1948. At the 1950 general election he stood unsuccessfully for election to parliament at Greenwich. From 1952 - 1958 he represented Holborn and St Pancras South on the London County Council.

He resigned from the county council in 1958 to become chairman of W & A Gilbey, a post he held for eleven years. At the time Gilbey's was the largest wine and spirits company in the United Kingdom, and he oversaw its merger into International Distillers & Vintners.

Gilbey soon returned to local politics: serving as a member of St Pancras Borough Council from 1959 to 1962. In 1962 he was made a Commander of the Order of the British Empire for political and public services in London. He returned to local government for a third time in 1967 as a member of the Greater London Council representing Haringey until 1973.
