= Wood Green (electoral division) =

Electoral division in Greater London, 1973–1986

- Former electoral division for the Greater London Council
- District: Haringey
- Electorate: 51,975 (1973); 51,581 (1977); 51,027 (1981)
- Major settlements: Wood Green
- Area: 1,115 hectares (11.15 km^{2})

Former electoral division
- Created: 1973
- Abolished: 1986
- Member: 1
- Created from: Haringey

Wood Green was an electoral division for the purposes of elections to the Greater London Council. The constituency elected one councillor for a four-year term in 1973, 1977 and 1981, with the final term extended for an extra year ahead of the abolition of the Greater London Council.

== History ==
It was planned to use the same boundaries as the Westminster Parliament constituencies for election of councillors to the Greater London Council (GLC), as had been the practice for elections to the predecessor London County Council, but those that existed in 1965 crossed the Greater London boundary. Until new constituencies could be settled, the 32 London boroughs were used as electoral areas. The London Borough of Haringey formed the Haringey electoral division. This was used for the Greater London Council elections in 1964, 1967 and 1970.

The new constituencies were settled following the Second Periodic Review of Westminster constituencies and the new electoral division matched the boundaries of the Wood Green parliamentary constituency.

It covered an area of 1,115 hectares (11.15 km^{2}).

== Elections ==
The Wood Greenconstituency was used for the Greater London Council elections in 1973, 1977 and 1981. One councillor was elected at each election using first-past-the-post voting.

=== 1973 election ===
The fourth election to the GLC (and first using revised boundaries) was held on 12 April 1973. The electorate was 51,975 and one Labour Party councillor was elected. The turnout was 31.1%. The councillor was elected for a three-year term. This was extended for an extra year in 1976 when the electoral cycle was switched to four-yearly.

1973 Greater London Council election: Wood Green
Party	Candidate	Votes	%	±%
Labour	Stephen Michael Alan Haseler	10,305	63.74	
Conservative	Rodney Charles Gent	5,862	36.26	
Turnout				
Labour win (new seat)				

=== 1977 election ===
The fifth election to the GLC (and second using revised boundaries) was held on 5 May 1977. The electorate was 51,581 and one Conservative Party councillor was elected. The turnout was 40.9%. The councillor was elected for a four-year term.

1977 Greater London Council election: Wood Green
Party	Candidate	Votes	%	±%
Conservative	Jenefer Gwendolen Anne Riley	9,168	43.47	
Labour	Maureen Harwood	8,109	38.45	
National Front	Keith Squire	2,092	9.92	
Liberal	Mrs AD Viney	905	4.29	
Independent	Denis Hawes	646	3.06	
National Party	Mrs J. Lennox	172	0.82	
Turnout				
Conservative gain from Labour		Swing		

Hawes: North East Tottenham Campaign Against Traffic

=== 1981 election ===
The sixth and final election to the GLC (and third using revised boundaries) was held on 7 May 1981. The electorate was 51,027 and one Labour Party councillor was elected. The turnout was 42.7%. The councillor was elected for a four-year term, extended by an extra year by the Local Government (Interim Provisions) Act 1984, ahead of the abolition of the council.

1981 Greater London Council election: Wood Green
Party	Candidate	Votes	%	±%
Labour	Michael Ward	10,908	50.09	
Conservative	Jenefer Gwendolen Anne Riley	8,159	37.45	
Liberal	Alan N Sherwell	2,010	9.23	
National Front	Anthony J Deboise	359	1.65	
New Britain	Robert G Pritchard	346	1.59	
Turnout				
Labour gain from Conservative		Swing		
