= Naomi Sargant =

British academic, educationist (1933–2006)

Naomi Sargent
- Born: Naomi Ellen Sargent; 10 December 1933; London, England
- Died: 23 July 2006 (aged 72); London, England
- Education: Bedford College, University of London
- Occupations: Academic; television executive
- Spouses: Peter Kelly (m. 1954, divorced); Andrew McIntosh (m. 1962)
- Children: 3

Naomi Ellen Sargant, Baroness McIntosh of Haringey (10 December 1933 – 23 July 2006) was a British television executive and academic specialising in adult education.

== Background ==
The daughter of Thomas Sargant, first secretary of JUSTICE, and Czech-born philologist Marie Hlouskova, Sargant was born in Hornsey, London, on 10 December 1933. She was educated at Friends School Saffron Walden, later graduating from Bedford College, University of London with a degree in sociology.

== Career ==
After an early career in market research and consumer interests (she was an associate of Michael Young on the National Consumer Council) Sargant became a college lecturer in 1967 and joined the new Open University in 1970, for whom (as Pro-Vice-Chancellor (Student Affairs) from 1974 to 1978) she presented the Open Forum programme on radio and television.

Sargant became professor of applied social research in 1978, remaining in the post until leaving the OU in 1981 to join Channel 4 as a senior commissioning editor for educational programming on a channel mandated to dedicate 15% of its output to education.

She left Channel 4 in 1989 and became an executive member of the National Institute for Adult Continuing Education. NIACE published Lifelong Learning: A Brave and Proper Vision Selected writings of Naomi Sargant in 2009 and organises an annual memorial lecture in her honour. NIACE director Alan Tuckett described Sargant at the time of her death as "among the most distinguished adult educators of the post-war era".

== Personal life and death ==
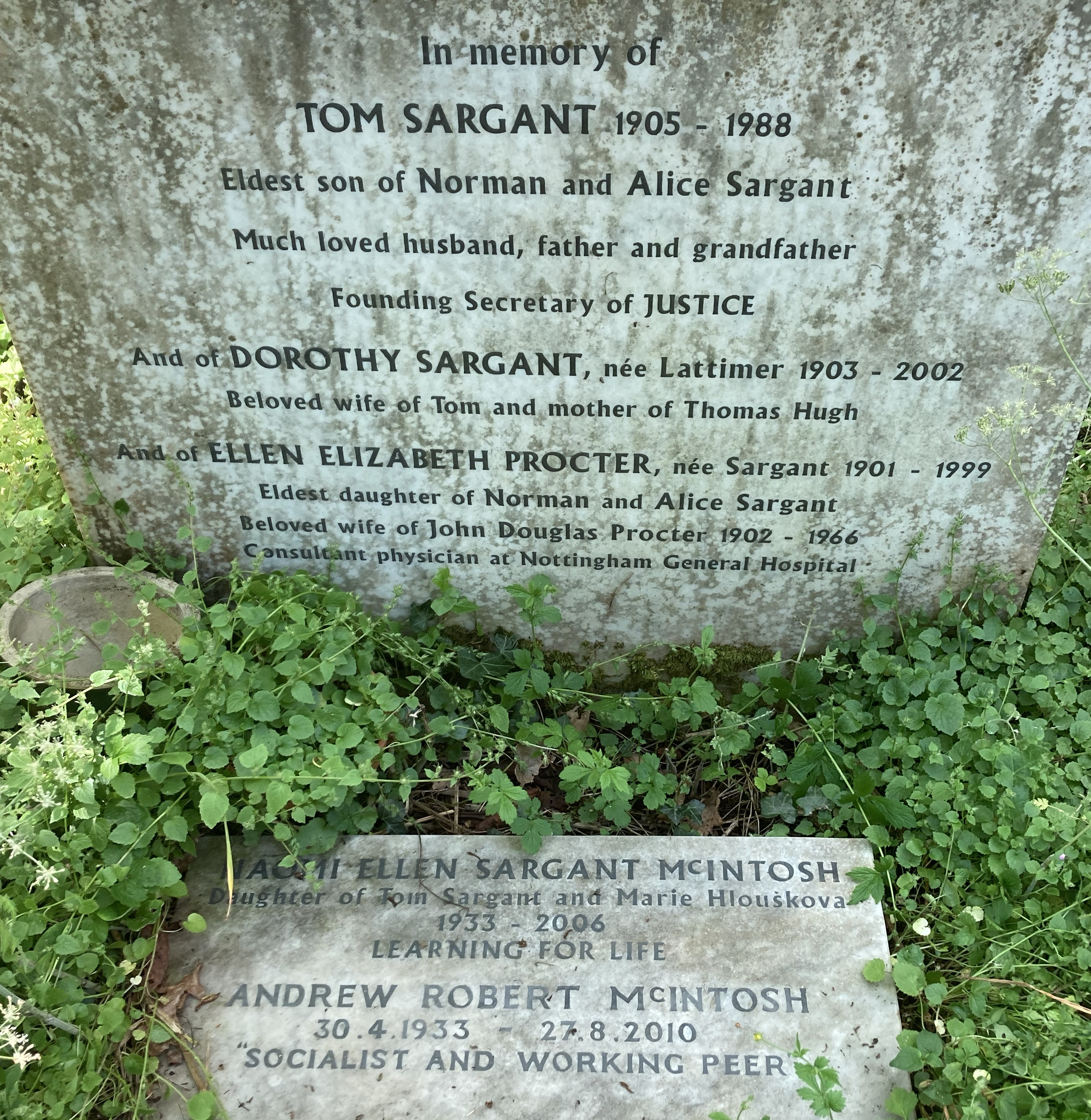
Grave of Naomi Sargant in Highgate Cemetery

Sargant had been married twice, first to Peter Kelly, from 1954 until their divorce, and secondly to Andrew McIntosh, from 1962 until her death in London from cancer on 23 July 2006. She had three sons: David Andrew Kelly (from her first marriage) and Francis Robert McIntosh and Philip Henry Sargant McIntosh (from her second marriage).
