= Haringey (electoral division) =

Electoral division in Greater London, 1965–1973

- Former electoral division for the Greater London Council
- Haringey electoral division boundaries
- District: London Borough of Haringey
- Population: 242,300 (1969 estimate)
- Electorate: 178,541 (1964); 167,952 (1967); 169,270 (1970)
- Area: 7,490.1 acres (30.311 km^{2})

Former electoral division
- Created: 1965
- Abolished: 1973
- Member(s): 3
- Replaced by: Hornsey, Tottenham and Wood Green

Haringey was an electoral division for the purposes of elections to the Greater London Council. The constituency elected three councillors for a three-year term in 1964, 1967 and 1970.

== History ==
It was planned to use the same boundaries as the Westminster Parliament constituencies for election of councillors to the Greater London Council (GLC), as had been the practice for elections to the predecessor London County Council, but those that existed in 1965 crossed the Greater London boundary. Until new constituencies could be settled, the 32 London boroughs were used as electoral areas which therefore created a constituency called Haringey.

The electoral division was replaced from 1973 by the single-member electoral divisions of Hornsey, Tottenham and Wood Green.

== Elections ==
The Haringey constituency was used for the Greater London Council elections in 1964, 1967 and 1970. Three councillors were elected at each election using first-past-the-post voting.

=== 1964 election ===
The first election was held on 9 April 1964, a year before the council came into its powers. The electorate was 178,541 and three Labour Party councillors were elected. With 75,724 people voting, the turnout was 42.4%. The councillors were elected for a three-year term.

1964 Greater London Council election: Haringey
Party	Candidate	Votes	%	±%
Labour	Annie Florence Remington	39,698		
Labour	Louis Albert Vitoria	39,412		
Labour	Gladys Felicia Dimson	39,412		
Conservative	A. G. Brown	31,284		
Conservative	H. H. Godwin-Monck	30,849		
Conservative	N. Muldoon	30,177		
Communist	E. L. Ramsay	5,612		
Turnout				
Labour win (new seat)				
Labour win (new seat)				
Labour win (new seat)				

=== 1967 election ===
The second election was held on 13 April 1967. The electorate was 167,952 and three Conservative Party councillors were elected. With 69,258 people voting, the turnout was 41.2%. The councillors were elected for a three-year term.

1967 Greater London Council election: Haringey
Party	Candidate	Votes	%	±%
Conservative	Lawrence Arthur Bains	35,073		
Conservative	Alfred Ronald Dashwood Gilbey	34,635		
Conservative	Michael Peter Russell Malynn	34,437		
Labour	Annie Florence Remington	27,051		
Labour	Louis Albert Vitoria	26,599		
Labour	Gladys Felicia Dimson	25,878		
Liberal	D. E. Goode	3,493		
Liberal	D. C. M. Lambton	3,451		
Liberal	J. S. F. Parker	3,100		
Communist	E. L. Ramsay	2,820		
Socialist (GB)	A. J. L. Buick	1,277		
Socialist (GB)	J. Carter	1,191		
Socialist (GB)	D. R. M. Davies	1,067		
Turnout				
Conservative gain from Labour		Swing		
Conservative gain from Labour		Swing		
Conservative gain from Labour		Swing		

=== 1970 election ===
The third election was held on 9 April 1970. The electorate was 169,270 and three Conservative Party councillors were elected. With 56,731 people voting, the turnout was 33.5%. The councillors were elected for a three-year term.

1970 Greater London Council election: Haringey
Party	Candidate	Votes	%	±%
Conservative	Lawrence Arthur Bains	26,716		
Conservative	Alfred Ronald Dashwood Gilbey	26,471		
Conservative	Michael Peter Russell Malynn	26,156		
Labour	A. J. R. Chaplin	25,625		
Labour	J. Morrissey	24,949		
Labour	L. D. Gurr	24,890		
Liberal	C. J. Fox	1,997		
Liberal	J. S. F. Parker	1,928		
Liberal	D. H. Edwards	1,910		
Communist	M. Morris	1,337		
Communist	E. L. Ramsay	982		
Homes before Roads	S. J. Hicklin	461		
Homes before Roads	K. B. Phillips	458		
Socialist (GB)	J. Carter	443		
Socialist (GB)	A. J. L. Buick	374		
Homes before Roads	M. A. Thompson	353		
Independent	F. J. Cooper	234		
Socialist (GB)	A. Waite	212		
Independent	K. Borowski	212		
Independent	M. Whittaker	154		
Independent	S. L. Kibble	149		
Union Movement	R. Summers	145		
Independent	P. Kerner	133		
Independent	C. R. Hood	77		
Turnout				
Conservative hold		Swing		
Conservative hold		Swing		
Conservative hold		Swing		

- Cooper/Borowski/Kibble: Bread and Circuses Party
- Whittaker: Campaign for Non-Political Social Awareness
- Kerner: All Night Party
