= Blue Crow Media =

British map publisher

- Founded: 2010
- Founder: Derek Lamberton
- Country of origin: United Kingdom
- Distribution: Turnaround Books
- Publication types: Maps, Books
- Nonfiction topics: Architecture
- Official website: www.bluecrowmedia.com

Blue Crow Media is a London-based independent publisher founded in 2010 by Derek Lamberton. Its early publications include a series of food and drink city guides, and since 2015 the publisher has put out a series of “handsome architectural guides”. The New York Times has described the maps as "part design manifesto, part urban architecture guide".

== History ==
In 2015 Blue Crow Media published their first architecture guide, Brutalist London Map, which was followed by Art Deco London Map, Constructivist Moscow Map, Brutalist Washington Map, Modern Berlin Map , Brutalist Paris Map, Brutalist Sydney Map, Modernist Belgrade Map, Brutalist Boston Map, Concrete New York Map, and Concrete Tokyo Map. London Underground Architecture & Design Map by Mark Ovenden is the first in a new series dedicated to the architecture and design of public transport systems. In 2017, Blue Crow Media’s Lamberton was shortlisted by Edward Stanford Travel Writing Awards for the London Book Fair Innovation in Travel Publishing Award.

In 2025 Blue Crow Media began publishing a series of architectural books. Brutalist Interiors was selected as a 2025 book of the year by the Financial Times.
