= Due South (magazine) =

- Cover of issue 18 from 27 January 1984
- Categories: Listings magazine
- Founded: 1981
- Final issue: 1990
- Country: United Kingdom
- Based in: Southampton

Due South was a British listings magazine which covered the region on the south coast from Bournemouth to Portsmouth. It was based in Southampton.

Due South was among a number of provincial what's-on/entertainment guides produced during the late 1970s and early 1980s in a similar style to London's Time Out, City Limits and Event magazines. Other key regional listings magazines launched in the same period which formed a loose association with Due South included Manchesters City Life, Bristol's Venue, The List, which covered Glasgow and Edinburgh, and Dublin's In Dublin.

Due South was produced fortnightly between 1981 and 1990. Originally the magazine began as a co-operative and was founded in Southampton by art student Mark Ovenden, who became the magazine's editor, and book-publisher Roger Hardingham. It went through various incarnations, including a freesheet, before settling down for several years as a limited company. The second editor was Sally O'Shaungnessy, who had begun as a freelance contributor to the arts pages. The magazine featured on BBC Radio 1s Newsbeat, TVSs 'Coast to Coast' and in the Southampton Evening Echo. The Echo was at that stage the dominant force in local publishing and had a generally conservative outlook. Due South was the region's first credible widely distributed consumer magazine with alternative, generally leftist politics.

== Notable people associated with Due South ==
The magazine was predominantly run by young and enthusiastic volunteers and freelance contributors, many of whom went on to become well-recognised names in their field. Notable writers, photographers and cartoonists commissioned by the magazine and subsequently becoming professional include:

- John Aizlewood Music and sports writer & broadcaster
- Anne-Marie Blatchford Feminist cartoonist
- Tony Crossley illustrator
- Brin Edwards Illustrator
- Martin Fletcher author
- Brian Hooper folk music writer
- Mark Ovenden author and broadcaster
- Jane Penston graphic designer
- Allene Tuck Poet
- Chris Walker jazz music writer
