= Sheila Faith =

British politician

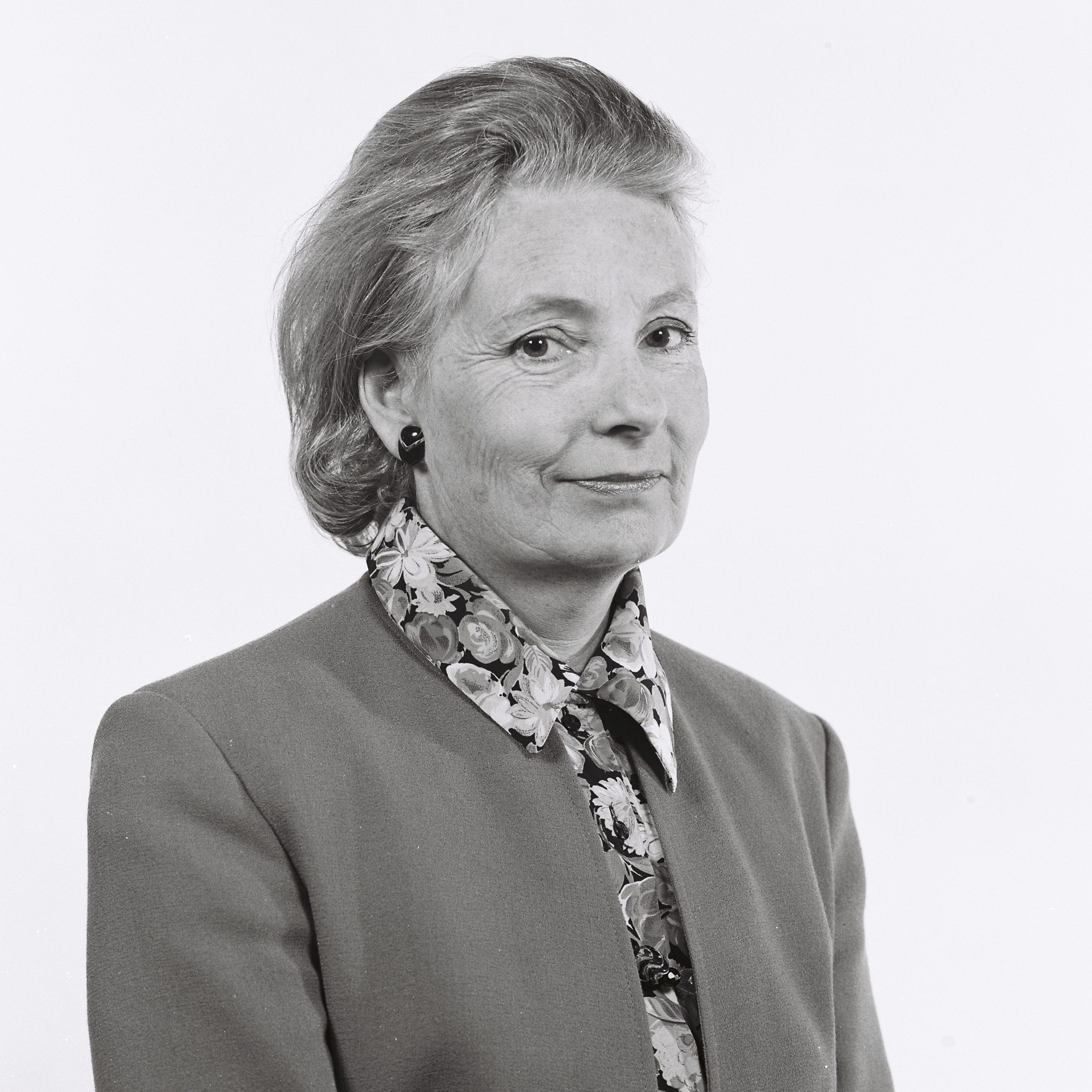
- Official MEP portrait of Faith, 1984

Member of Parliament for Belper
- In office 3 May 1979 – 13 May 1983
- Preceded by: Roderick MacFarquhar
- Succeeded by: Constituency abolished

Member of the European Parliament for Cumbria and Lancashire North
- In office 1984–1989
- Preceded by: Elaine Kellett-Bowman
- Succeeded by: Richard Fletcher-Vane

Personal details
- Born: Irene Sheila Book; 3 June 1928 Newcastle upon Tyne, England
- Died: 28 September 2014 (aged 86) Newcastle upon Tyne, Tyne and Wear, England
- Party: Conservative

Irene Sheila Faith (née Book; 3 June 1928 – 28 September 2014) was a British politician and dental surgeon. She served one term each in the House of Commons and European Parliament as a Conservative. She was a native of Newcastle upon Tyne and attended Newcastle upon Tyne Central High School and the University of Durham.

== Early career ==
Faith qualified as a dental surgeon in 1950, the same year she married Dennis Faith. She was a Justice of the Peace serving on the bench in Northumberland and later in Newcastle upon Tyne. She began her political career in 1970 when she was elected to Northumberland County Council from a division in Newcastle, and served until the area was removed from the county in boundary changes in 1974. She then fought Newcastle upon Tyne Central in the October 1974 general election. From 1975 to 1978 she was a member of Newcastle upon Tyne City Council for the ward of Newburn No. 3.

== Parliament ==
In 1977 Faith was selected as candidate for Belper, a constituency in Derbyshire which was narrowly held by Labour. She managed a reasonable swing in the 1979 general election in line with the national average, which was enough to win the seat by 882 votes. Sheila Faith was one of the two women out of 77 newcomers when she entered the House of Commons in 1979. In Parliament she became known for her internationalism, sat on the committee on unopposed Private bills, and was Secretary of the Conservative backbench Health and Social Services Committee from 1979–83. She spoke on behalf of the pharmacists, nurses, and on medical affairs in general.

Boundary changes due to be implemented at the 1983 general election abolished the Belper constituency, with the majority of the voters going to a new South Derbyshire constituency which was estimated to be easier for Labour to win. Faith decided that she would not offer herself for reselection there, but attempted to get a more winnable seat elsewhere. She attended several selection committees but was not selected, and therefore went out of Parliament after one term. South Derbyshire selected another woman, the younger Birmingham city councillor Edwina Currie, who was elected with a majority of more than 8,000.

== European Parliament and after ==
The decision of Elaine Kellett-Bowman to stand down as Member of the European Parliament for Cumbria in favour of her seat in the British Parliament gave Faith the opportunity to resume a political career at the headquarters of the European Community, of which she was a strong supporter of British membership.

Later, she was elected MEP for Cumbria and Lancashire North in the 1984 European election, and served one term before retiring. She was a member of the Committee on Energy, Research, and Technology. Sellafield was located in the constituency. She was appointed as an unpaid member of the Parole Board of England and Wales from 1991 to 1994 by the Conservative government. Sheila Faith was president of the Cumbria and Lancashire North Constituency Council from 1989–95.

Parliament of the United Kingdom
Preceded by Roderick MacFarquhar	Member of Parliament for Belper; 1979–1983	Constituency abolished
European Parliament
Preceded by Elaine Kellett-Bowman	Member of the European Parliament for Cumbria and Lancashire North; 1984–1989	Succeeded by Richard Fletcher-Vane
