= Gaie France =

French far-right gay magazine

Gaie France, or Gaie France Magazine, was a French monthly magazine for gay readers founded in 1986 by Michel Caignet. It frequently published naked photographs of adolescent boys and was linked closely to the French far-right.

== Historical ==
Gaie France was sold on newsstands and reflected cultural and political ambitions close to the New Right. The director of publication, Michel Caignet, believed that the gay community had a role to play in the perspective of a cultural, political, and artistic renewal within Europe. The magazine was deeply associated with the French far-right, featuring text written by far-right figures like Guillaume Faye and Philippe Randa.

Paul Raisant led the Association of Friends of Gaie France, which published a bulletin called Sparte, homosexualité et tradition in 1987.

The magazine focused heavily on pornographic images of adolescents, and offered money to underage readers willing to send in naked photos of themselves. It frequently contained defences of paedophilia and hosted small ads sections in which paedophiles arranged to meet and rent spaces from each other. In keeping with its racist values, it published articles arguing for the superiority of blond and blue-eyed boys.

Gaie France was prohibited for sale to minors by ministerial decree on May 27, 1992, due to "incitement to paedophilia". It ceased publication in 1993.

== Collaborators ==
- Claude Courouve
- Guillaume Faye
- Pierre Gripari
- Philippe Randa
