= Lancashire South (European Parliament constituency) =

Former European Parliament constituency

- European Parliament constituency
- Boundary within North West England (1994-1999)
- Member state: United Kingdom
- Created: 1994
- Dissolved: 1999
- MEPs: 1

Prior to its uniform adoption of proportional representation in 1999, the United Kingdom used first-past-the-post for the European elections in England, Scotland and Wales. The European Parliament constituencies used under that system were smaller than the later regional constituencies and only had one Member of the European Parliament each.

The constituency of Lancashire South was one of them.

When it was created in England in 1994, it consisted of the Westminster Parliament constituencies of Blackburn, Bury North, Chorley, Hyndburn, Rossendale and Darwen, South Ribble, West Lancashire.

== MEPs ==
Election	Member	Party
1994	Michael Hindley	Labour

== Election results ==
European Parliament election, 1994: Lancashire South
Party	Candidate	Votes	%	±%
Labour	Michael Hindley	92,598	54.3	
Conservative	C.R. (Richard) Topham	51,194	30.0	
Liberal Democrats	J.A. Ault	17,008	10.0	
Green	J.E. Gaffney	4,774	2.8	
Independent	Mrs. Eva Rokas	3,439	2.0	
Natural Law	John C. Renwick	1,605	0.9	
Majority		41,404	24.3	
Turnout		170,618		
Labour win (new seat)				
