= Lancashire East (European Parliament constituency) =

Former European Parliament constituency

- European Parliament constituency
- Boundary within North West England (1979-1984)
- Member state: United Kingdom
- Created: 1979
- Dissolved: 1994
- MEPs: 1

Prior to its uniform adoption of proportional representation in 1999, the United Kingdom used first-past-the-post for the European elections in England, Scotland and Wales. The European Parliament constituencies used under that system were smaller than the later regional constituencies and only had one Member of the European Parliament each.

The constituency of Lancashire East was one of them.

Boundary within North West England (1984-1994)

== Boundaries ==
1979-1984: Accrington, Blackburn, Burnley, Clitheroe, Darwen, Heywood and Royton, Nelson and Colne, Rossendale
1984-1994: Blackburn, Burnley, Heywood and Middleton, Hyndburn, Littleborough and Saddleworth, Pendle, Rochdale, Rossendale and Darwen

== MEPs ==
Elected	Member	Party
1979	Edward Kellett-Bowman	Conservative
1984	Michael Hindley	Labour
1994	Constituency abolished	

== Election results ==
European Parliament election, 1979: Lancashire East
Party	Candidate	Votes	%	±%
Conservative	Edward Kellett-Bowman	77,087	49.9	
Labour	M. Walsh	62,729	40.6	
Liberal	P. R. Easton	12,268	7.9	
Independent Democratic	F. Tyrrall	2,473	1.6	
Majority		14,358	9.3	
Turnout		154,557	33.2	
Conservative win (new seat)				

European Parliament election, 1984: Lancashire East
Party	Candidate	Votes	%	±%
Labour	Michael Hindley	75,711	44.6	+4.0
Conservative	Edward Kellett-Bowman	67,806	39.9	−10.0
Liberal	Gordon Lishman	26,320	15.5	+7.6
Majority		7,905	4.7	N/A
Turnout		169,837	31.8	
Labour gain from Conservative		Swing		

European Parliament election, 1989: Lancashire East
Party	Candidate	Votes	%	±%
Labour	Michael Hindley	96,946	51.5	+6.9
Conservative	Robert W. Sturdy	57,799	30.7	−9.2
Green	Steve P. Barker	20,741	11.0	New
SLD	Mike Hambley	12,682	6.8	−8.7
Majority		39,147	20.8	+16.1
Turnout		188,168	35.5	+3.7
Labour hold		Swing		
