= Hornsey (electoral division) =

Electoral division in Greater London, 1973–1986

- Former electoral division for the Greater London Council
- Hornsey electoral division boundaries
- District: Haringey
- Electorate: 60,734 (1973); 58,485 (1977); 56,246 (1981)
- Major settlements: Hornsey
- Area: 1,162 hectares (11.62 km^{2})

Former electoral division
- Created: 1973
- Abolished: 1986
- Member: 1
- Created from: Haringey

Hornsey was an electoral division for the purposes of elections to the Greater London Council. The constituency elected one councillor for a four-year term in 1973, 1977 and 1981, with the final term extended for an extra year ahead of the abolition of the Greater London Council.

== History ==
It was planned to use the same boundaries as the Westminster Parliament constituencies for election of councillors to the Greater London Council (GLC), as had been the practice for elections to the predecessor London County Council, but those that existed in 1965 crossed the Greater London boundary. Until new constituencies could be settled, the 32 London boroughs were used as electoral areas. The London Borough of Haringey formed the Haringey electoral division. This was used for the Greater London Council elections in 1964, 1967 and 1970.

The new constituencies were settled following the Second Periodic Review of Westminster constituencies and the new electoral division matched the boundaries of the Hornsey parliamentary constituency.

It covered an area of 1,162 hectares (11.62 km^{2}).

== Elections ==
The Hornsey constituency was used for the Greater London Council elections in 1973, 1977 and 1981. One councillor was elected at each election using first-past-the-post voting. Lawrence Arthur Bains, who won the seat at the 1973 and 1977 elections, had also been elected to the predecessor Haringey electoral division in 1967 and 1970.

=== 1973 election ===
The fourth election to the GLC (and first using revised boundaries) was held on 12 April 1973. The electorate was 60,734 and one Conservative Party councillor was elected. The turnout was 40.4%. The councillor was elected for a three-year term. This was extended for an extra year in 1976 when the electoral cycle was switched to four-yearly.

1973 Greater London Council election: Hornsey
Party	Candidate	Votes	%	±%
Conservative	Lawrence Arthur Bains	10,361	42.27	
Labour	John Golden Warren	10,078	41.10	
Liberal	Patrick William O'Brien	3,450	14.08	
Communist	B P Van den Berg	483	1.97	
Socialist (GB)	D J Porter	144	0.59	
Turnout				
Conservative win (new seat)				

=== 1977 election ===
The fifth election to the GLC (and second using revised boundaries) was held on 5 May 1977. The electorate was 58,485 and one Conservative Party councillor was elected. The turnout was 44.4%. The councillor was elected for a four-year term.

1977 Greater London Council election: Hornsey
Party	Candidate	Votes	%	±%
Conservative	Lawrence Arthur Bains	13,972	53.77	
Labour	Charles L Silverstone	9,405	36.20	
Liberal	Francis A Coleman	1,771	6.82	
National Front	Bruce W Pell	826	3.18	
Turnout				
Conservative hold		Swing		

=== 1981 election ===
The sixth and final election to the GLC (and third using revised boundaries) was held on 7 May 1981. The electorate was 56,246 and one Labour Party councillor was elected. The turnout was 49.2%. The councillor was elected for a four-year term, extended by an extra year by the Local Government (Interim Provisions) Act 1984, ahead of the abolition of the council.

1981 Greater London Council election: Hornsey
Party	Candidate	Votes	%	±%
Labour	Anthony Bernard Hart	12,311	44.48	
Conservative	Christopher Hannington	11,758	42.47	
Liberal	Richard D. Kennard	2,870	10.36	
Ecology	Miriam F. Daus	740	2.67	
Turnout				
Labour gain from Conservative		Swing		
