= City Life (magazine) =

English magazine in Manchester (1983–2005)

- Categories: Entertainment magazine
- Frequency: Weekly
- Founded: December 1983
- Final issue: December 2005
- Company: Trinity Mirror
- Country: United Kingdom
- Based in: Manchester
- Website: citylife.co.uk

City Life was a Manchester-based news, arts and listings magazine that was published between December 1983 and December 2005. It was a distinctive blend of radical politics and coverage of the increasingly exciting Manchester youth culture scene of the early 1980s, coinciding with the rise of Factory Records and The Haçienda.

== History ==
The magazine was started by a small group of former Manchester University students, Ed Glinert, Chris Paul and Andy Spinoza, on a shoestring budget in a run-down building in Portland Street in the city centre.

When launched in 1983, the magazine was in a strong tradition of "alternative2 Manchester publications that included (in reverse chronology), City Fun, Manchester Flash, New Manchester Review and Mole Express, all of whose approach was to publish political and cultural content not reflected in the mainstream media of the city.

Despite City Life's shoestring beginnings, it developed rapidly in professionalism and grew in prominence and influence in Manchester and beyond. Its life can be divided into two distinct periods, the first being the period 1983–89 when it was run as a workers' co-operative which grew from the initial founding trio to 16 staff at its peak.

There is a consensus that this "independent" period was when the title had a rawer and radical edge than under its later ownership. Its political stories caused consternation and complaints - there were numerous spats with councils, quangos and occasionally blank spaces where legal injunctions had caused stories to be pulled just prior to printing.

Similarly, its arts writing can be seen as a vibrant record of a ground-level cultural renaissance taking place with the opening of new facilities as the Hacienda (1982), the Green Room performance venue (1984) and the Cornerhouse visual arts centre (1985); this upsurge was typified by the imaginative re-using of old and vacant city centre buildings for arts and leisure, and can be seen as a key building block of what was later hailed as the physical regeneration of Manchester city centre through widespread commercial investment and property development.

=== Acquisition by Guardian Media Group ===
In 1989, it was bought by the Guardian Media Group (GMG), publishers of The Guardian and The Manchester Evening News. GMG changed the style of the magazine, focusing more on listings and interviews, and branching out into publishing guide books and sponsoring events such as the City Life Food and Drink Festival, the City Life Comedian of the Year competition, and music events.

City Life formed a loose association in 1984/5 with some other regional listings magazines including Due South Magazine (Southampton), Venue (Bristol), Coaster (Bournemouth), and The List (Glasgow and Edinburgh). Of these only Venue and The List survive, having been continually published since 1982 and 1985 respectively.

In November 2005 it was announced that City Life was to end publication, with the final edition published on 7 December.

=== Supplement ===
City Life's publisher, Diverse Media, was acquired by the fellow GMG media outlet, Manchester Evening News, and City Life now lives on as a 20-page supplement every Friday within the Manchester Evening News, and continues to be the most-read Whats On guide on the North of England (333k readers. Source: JICREG April 2014). Its website http://www.manchestereveningnews.co.uk/whats-on/ regularly generates over a million page views every month from more than 250k unique users (Source: Omniture September 2014)

CityLife's sister title CityLife Extra is a Free solus publication delivered every Thursday to 16k City Centre apartments and a further 6k copies handed out with the Manchester Evening News. More than half of its 64 pages are devoted to "Urban Life", advertising property for sale in the city.

== Notable people associated with City Life ==
Writers:

- Dick Witts
- Kevin Cummins
- Mark Kermode
- John Robb
- Daniel Brocklehurst
- Louise Rhodes
- Jon Ronson
- Henry Normal
- Melvin Burgess
