= Capital Gay =

Weekly free newspaper for lesbians and gays in London and Brighton

Front of Capital Gay issue no. 687 (24 March 1995)

Capital Gay was a weekly free gay newspaper published in London founded by Graham McKerrow and Michael Mason. Its first issue was published on 26 June 1981, during Pride Week; the paper folded with the issue dated 30 June 1995. Despite its name, it was also distributed in Brighton and had a combined circulation, in the two cities, of around 20,000 at the time when publication ceased. Initially priced at 20p, it became a freesheet after six months.

McKerrow and Mason met while working at Gay News and designed Capital Gay as a complementary publication. Compared with Gay News, which was fortnightly and had an 11-day lead time between print deadline and its availability, Capital Gay had a shorter production time of 24 hours, and came out more frequently, every week. The aim was to provide a news service for London and Brighton, particularly for users of the growing commercial lesbian and gay scene, to provide a link between the political movement and the commercial scene, and to facilitate swifter political responses by the LGBT movement than had previously been possible. The news pages covered politics and non-political news, while regular contributors provided comment and analysis.

Capital Gay sponsored the London Lesbian and Gay Switchboard and involved itself in events in the wider gay community in London; its editorial line tended to be strong. It is credited by the Oxford English Dictionary with being the first publication in the world to use the term HIV (the second being the international science journal Nature); it also hosted the world's first regular column on AIDS, which was written by Julian Meldrum (Meldrum on AIDS) from 1984 to 1986, and by Tony Whitehead (Body Matters) from 1986 to 1990. For some years, with no reliable information on the threat of AIDS publicly available in the medical or national press, Capital Gay widened its distribution to cover cities with large gay populations including Manchester and Brighton. Copies were sent by rail and distributed to local clubs, bars and hotels by volunteers.

During the controversy over Section 28 in December 1987, the paper's offices were targeted in an arson attack. After being accused by Labour MP Tony Banks of legitimising the incident, Conservative Member of Parliament Dame Elaine Kellett-Bowman was quoted in Hansard as saying: "I am quite prepared to affirm that it is quite right that there should be an intolerance of evil."

== Editors ==
- Graham McKerrow
- Michael Mason
- Stephen Burn
- Gillian Rodgerson
- Simon Edge
