= Michael Hindley =

British politician

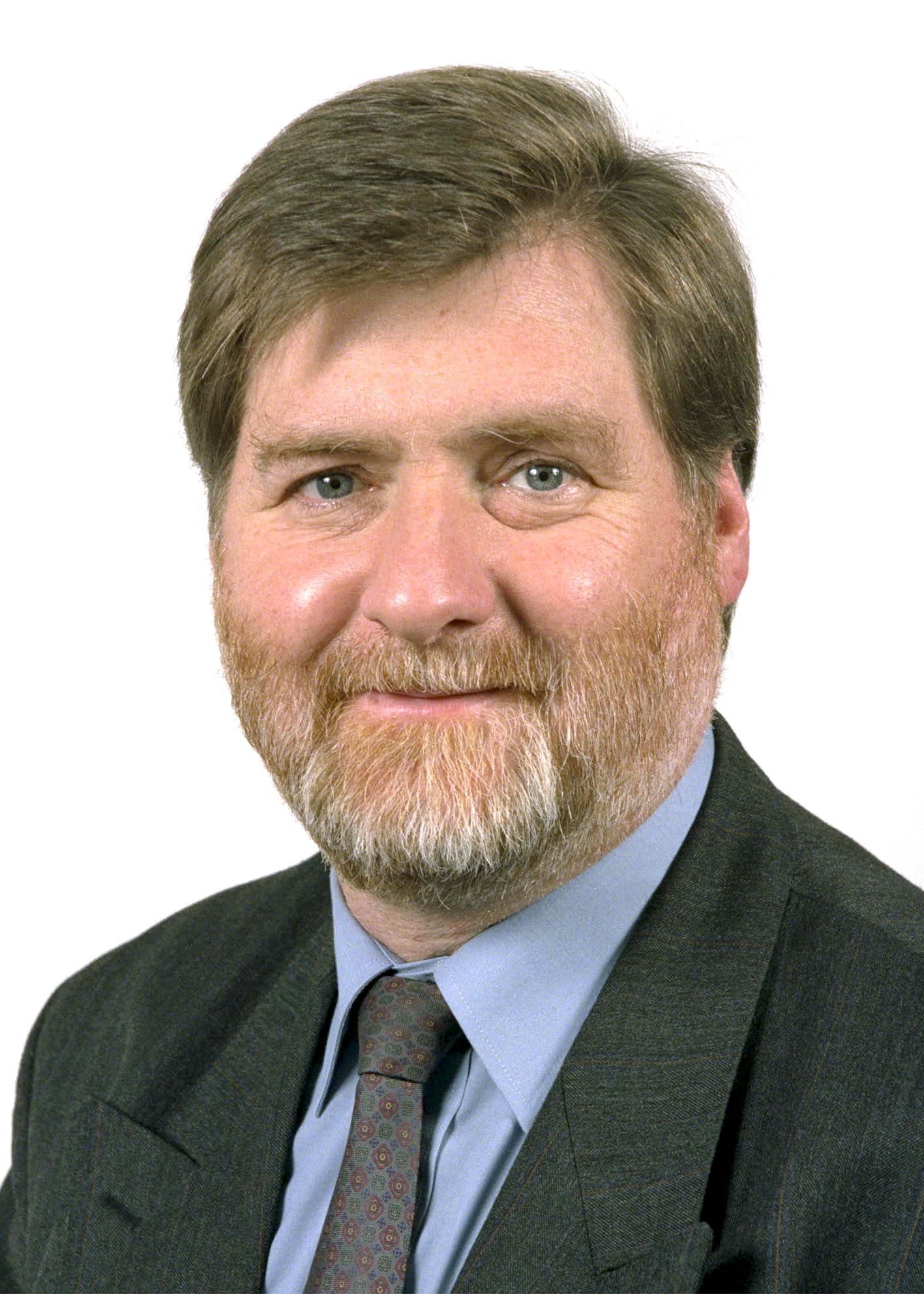
- Hindley in 1994

Member of the European Parliament
- In office 24 July 1984 – 19 July 1999
- Constituency: Lancashire East

Personal details
- Born: 11 April 1947 (age 79) Blackburn, United Kingdom
- Party: Labour
- Occupation: Politician

Michael Hindley (born 11 April 1947) is a British politician who served in the European Parliament.

== History ==
Hindley was born in Blackburn and attended Clitheroe Royal Grammar School, the University of Lancaster, the Free University of Berlin, and the University of London. He became a lecturer, and was also elected to Hyndburn District Council, serving as its leader from 1981 until 1984. At the 1983 general election, he stood unsuccessfully for the Labour Party in Blackpool North.

Hindley was a Member of the European Parliament (MEP) representing Lancashire East from 1984 to 1994, and Lancashire South from 1994 to 1999. Hindley was Vice-President of External Economics Affairs Committee and wrote reports on Europe's relations with China, Hong Kong, Macao, Vietnam, North Korea, ASEAN, Gulf States, Belarus. Subsequently served as Labour County Councillor in Lancashire (2001–2005) where he was responsible for implementation of Race Relations Amendment Act. Elected to Hyndburn Borough Council May 2021. Has been Associate Professor at Georgetown University, Washington DC. From 2008 to 2019 Trade Policy Adviser to European Economic and Social Committee (EESC)and has authored reports on EU relations with Central Asia; Trade in Strategic Raw Materials; TTIP; EU Trade and Sustainable Development. Frequently lectures on EU External Policy most recently at City University, Geneva, Technical University, Tallinn, Estonia, Gottingen University, Germany and Mangalore University India.Published "The Semidetached European" Manipal Universal Press, 2021. Since May 2021 Coordinator of the European Parliament to Campus Programme. https://www.yorkshirebylines.co.uk/author/michaelhindley

== Parliamentary service ==
- Vice-Chair, Committee on External Economic Relations (1984–1987)
- Vice-Chair, Delegation for relations with the countries of Eastern Europe (1985–1987)
- Vice-Chair, Committee on External Economic Relations (1994–1997)
