= Hornsey (surname) =

Hornsey is a surname. Notable people with the surname include:

- Kate Hornsey (born 1981), Australian rower
- Tom Hornsey (born 1989), Australian-born American football punter
