= El Shad =

Algerian LGBTQ magazine

El Shad (Arabic الشاذ) is the first magazine of the LGBTQI+ community in Algeria. The term means "abnormal", which is an insult to homosexuals. One of the cofounders states, "We chose this name because we claim this abnormality, just as everyone is abnormal."

== Description ==
Available online, El Shad is a quarterly and completely free magazine, intended for the Algerian LGBT community. The magazine was initiated by three members of the LGBT organization Alouen. It was created in November 2014. LeXo Fanzine, an Algerian lesbian magazine, was started earlier by a member of Alouen.

The editor-in-chief is O. Harim.
