= Venue (magazine) =

UK listings magazine for Bristol and Bath (1982–2013)

- Venue magazine dated 20–29 April 2007
- Type: Former fortnightly/weekly/monthly print magazine
- Format: A4
- Owner: Northcliffe Newspapers Group
- Publisher: Bristol United Press (BUP)
- Editor-in-chief: David Higgitt (until May 2012)
- Editor: Tom Wainwright
- Founded: 1982
- Ceased publication: 2012 (continued in online form)
- Language: English

Venue was the listings magazine for the Bristol and Bath areas of the UK. It was founded in 1982 by journalists who had been working for another Bristol magazine, Out West, which had been consciously modelled on London's Time Out magazine.

Originally published fortnightly, Venue gained a reputation for the quality and authority of its coverage of the local arts and entertainments scene. It played a leading part in re-establishing Ashton Court Festival and was an early champion of the Bristol Sound in the early 1990s. It continued to play a significant role in nurturing and promoting local art, theatre, film and music until its closure in April 2012. Venue's last editor was the playwright Tom Wainwright.

Venue also had a reputation for investigative reporting of local issues, including health, policing, local politics and environmental matters. Venue also featured humour and satire which many found attractive, but which was occasionally criticised as puerile. Stand-up comedian Mark Watson and comedy scriptwriter Stephen Merchant both worked for Venue when they were younger. Author and reviewer Kim Newman contributed regularly. Another author, Eugene Byrne, one of the magazine's founders, remained involved with it as Consulting Editor until the magazine ceased publication.

In 2000 the company was sold to Bristol United Press (BUP), the company which runs the Bristol Evening Post and Western Daily Press newspapers. BUP in turn was owned by the Northcliffe Newspaper Group, part of the Daily Mail & General Trust group. The takeover by BUP was controversial with many readers, advertisers and staff, particularly because the conservative political outlook of the Daily Mail was very different from that of Venue.

== Weekly edition ==
In 2001, Venue magazine started to publish weekly, and, trading as Venue Publishing, the company diversified further in the years after this. It produced a successful controlled-circulation lifestyle monthly, Folio (whose closure was announced in March 2013, with the April 2013 edition being its last published issue, following its latterly merging with Venue for a few combined issues), as well as several annual guides including Eating Out West, Drinking Out West, Days Out West, Venue Club Guide, a Student Guide for Bristol and Bath and a Festival Guide. Venue Publishing also undertook contract publishing, particularly for large local events such as the Bristol International Balloon Fiesta and the Bristol Harbour Festival. In 2005, Venue Publishing established an in-house design agency, Bang, offering design services to external clients.

The magazine was briefly associated with some other provincial listings magazines in the 1980s, like Manchester's City Life, Southampton's Due South magazine and The List, which covers Edinburgh and Glasgow. Only the last is still publishing.

== The Weekend 'Powered by Venue' ==
The Bristol Evening Post ceased its Saturday edition in April 2012. On 25 May 2012, The Post, as it was then titled, launched a new 64-page lifestyle magazine, The Weekend (subsequently shortened to Weekend), a supplement with its Friday edition. This carried many listings, reviews and entertainment articles derived from the Venue website and was justifiably straplined "powered by Venue". From issue 43 of The Weekend (15 March 2013), the strapline was quietly dropped. The Weekend magazine was relaunched with issue 252 (31 March 2017) as a larger-format publication, but still carrying many of the original Venue-style listings.

However, the distinctive Venue logo continued to be seen in printed format each Wednesday in a section of three or four pages in that day's Bristol edition of the free Metro (British newspaper), the section being headed "WHAT'S ON – The week ahead with Venue". The Venue name still continued also on periodic publications such as Venue Festival Guide '13 and Eating Out West 2013/14, the latter title reflecting the title of the magazine's own predecessor.

== Website ==
The Venue website, one of the longest-running commercial websites in the UK, was originally set up in 1995. Following the demise of the printed Venue magazine, the website continued to include event listings, music, theatre and comedy reviews, augmented by selected features from the Bristol Post's Weekend supplement and several of the annual guides, and included a popular free personal-advertisements section.

The Venue website was closed by Local World at 11am on Friday 29 November 2013. Venue writers, photographers etc. published an open letter on the site which subsequently went viral and was picked up by Buzzfeed.
