= Out This Week =

BBC LGBT+-focused radio programme

Out This Week is a pioneering LGBT+ weekly news programme that ran on BBC Radio 5Live for five years from 2 April 1994 - 1999, with as one of its founder/presenters Nigel Wrench and also featuring Justine Buchanan, Alison Hennegan and latterly Rebecca Sandles. Wrench and producer David Cook won a Sony Radio Award in 1995 for a landmark programme presented live from New York about Stonewall 25. Shortly after the award, the BBC extended their run to a full year.
