= Cumbria and Lancashire North (European Parliament constituency) =

Former European Parliament constituency

- European Parliament constituency
- Boundary within North West England (1984-1994)
- Member state: United Kingdom
- Created: 1984
- Dissolved: 1999
- MEPs: 1

Prior to its uniform adoption of proportional representation in 1999, the United Kingdom used first-past-the-post for the European elections in England, Scotland and Wales. The European Parliament constituencies used under that system were smaller than the later regional constituencies and only had one Member of the European Parliament each. The constituency of Cumbria and Lancashire North was one of them.

When it was created in England in 1984, it consisted of the Westminster Parliament constituencies of Barrow and Furness, Carlisle, Copeland, Lancaster, Morecambe and Lunesdale, Penrith and The Border, Westmorland and Lonsdale, Workington, and Wyre. In 1994, Wyre constituency was transferred to Lancashire Central, but otherwise the constituency's composition remained the same until its abolition in 1999.

Boundary within North West England (1994-1999)

== Boundaries ==
1984-1994: Barrow and Furness, Carlisle, Copeland, Lancaster, Morecambe and Lunesdale, Penrith and the Border, Westmorland and Lonsdale, Workington, Wyre.

1994-1999: As above less the Wyre constituency.

== Members of the European Parliament ==
Elected	Name	Party
1984	Sheila Faith	Conservative
1989	Richard Fletcher-Vane	Conservative
1994	Tony Cunningham	Labour
1999	Constituency abolished: see North West England	

== Election results ==
European Parliament election, 1984: Cumbria and Lancashire North
Party	Candidate	Votes	%	±%
Conservative	Sheila Faith	86,127	45.8	
Labour	John R. Atkinson	62,332	33.1	
Liberal	Mrs. K.C. Brooks	39,622	21.1	
Majority		23,795	12.7	
Turnout		188,081	34.4	
Conservative win (new seat)				

European Parliament election, 1989: Cumbria and Lancashire North
Party	Candidate	Votes	%	±%
Conservative	Richard Fletcher-Vane	84,035	41.2	−4.6
Labour	John M.P. Hutton	81,644	40.1	+7.0
Green	Mrs. Cath E. Smith	21,262	10.4	New
SLD	Edward E. Hill	12,590	6.2	−14.9
SDP	John Bates	4,206	2.1	New
Majority		2,391	1.1	−11.6
Turnout		203,737	36.3	+1.9
Conservative hold		Swing		

European Parliament election, 1994: Cumbria and Lancashire North
Party	Candidate	Votes	%	±%
Labour	Tony Cunningham	97,599	48.0	+7.9
Conservative	Lord Inglewood	74,611	36.7	−4.5
Liberal Democrats	Roger C. Putnam	24,233	11.9	+5.7
Green	R. J. (Dick) Frost	5,344	2.6	−7.8
Natural Law	Ian A. Docker	1,500	0.8	New
Majority		22,988	11.3	N/A
Turnout		203,287	40.8	+4.5
Labour gain from Conservative		Swing		
