= List of LGBTQ periodicals =

The following is a list of periodicals (printed magazines, journals and newspapers) aimed at the lesbian, gay, bisexual, transgender and queer (LGBTQ) demographic by country.

== Australia ==
A full list of Australian LGBTQ+ periodicals can be found at Australian Queer Archives.

- Archer. Melbourne: Drummond Street Services. ISSN 2204-7352. (2013–): The biannually published magazine focusing on sexuality, gender, and identity.
- DNA. New South Wales: DNA Men Nexus. ISSN 1443-1122. (2000–): Australia's best-selling LGBTQIA+ print title and the country's most widely circulated magazine for gay men. An entertainment and lifestyle publication, it mixes fashion and fitness coverage with reporting on political and social issues.
- Dreamboys. (Studio Magazines) OCLC 56750263.
- Lesbians on the Loose. (Iris) ISSN 1324-6542. : The most read lesbian magazine in Australia, which reached a circulation of 20,000 copies by 1998.
- Pink Advocate.
- Q Magazine. ISSN 1449-499X.
- QNews Magazine. ISSN 1833-4830. OCLC 223039064. Fortnightly since 2000
- Southern Star. (Gay Publications) ISSN 0819-5129. OCLC 220874467. , also ISSN 0816-4290, Victorian sister publication of Sydney Star Observer
- Star Observer
- Sydney Star Observer. (Gay Publications) ISSN 0819-5129. OCLC 220874467. , also ISSN 0816-4290
- They Shoot Homos Don't They?. (Shannon Michael Cane) OCLC 191573637.
- Wax. (Evolution Pub., Gay in WA Holdings) OCLC 437301176.

=== Free ===
- Cherrie. (Evolution Publishing)
- FUSE Magazine: Life, Love, Equality. (Lithium Innovation) ISSN 1836-8387.
- Out in Perth. (Westside Publishing) ISSN 1447-2678. OCLC 224286501.
- QNews Magazine. ISSN 1833-4830. OCLC 223039064. Monthly since 2021

=== Out of print ===
Blue magazine cover, June 2001 issue

- Blue. Sydney: Studio Magazines. ISSN 1323-0026. (1995–2007): A bimonthly visual arts magazine with a focus on male nude photography. The last issue was in 2007.
- Black+White
- Dandy. Sydney: Vice. (2012–2014): A digital magazine published between 2012 and 2014. It was a part of the Vice Blogging Network.
- Queensland Pride. (Evolution Publishing) OCLC 37172176.
- SX News. (E evolution Publishing) ISSN 1445-2642. OCLC 222860884.

== Austria ==
- GAY45 - Pan-European magazine dedicated to quality journalism with stations in Vienna and London - in English
- COXX – Vienna Gay News. (eDate Advertising GmbH)
- Pride. (Linz : Verein zur Förderung der Information über Schwule, Lesben und TransGender-Personen) OCLC 52802306.
- queerbook. (queermedia) , national
- XTRA!. (XTRA! Verein für Gesundheitsinformationt) , national
- Lambda Nachrichten. (Homosexuelle Initiative Wien) OCLC 30122454. , launch 1979

=== Out of print ===
- Tamtam. (Kulturverein Schwulesbisch in Gumpendorf) OCLC 24646763.

== Bangladesh ==
- Roopbaan (Two issues published in 2014. SEE Internet Archive for archived digital copies and SEE Wikipedia entry "Roopbaan").

== Belgium ==
- Gay Magazine. OCLC 320452597.
- ILGA-Europe. (International Lesbian & Gay Association, European Region) ISSN 1378-577X.
- LABELS Magazine. (LABELS Media & Publishing)
- ZiZo Magazine. (çavaria)

== Brazil ==
- A Capa
- G Magazine
- H Magazine
- Homens
- Junior
- Revista Via G

=== Out of print ===
- DOM - De Outro Modo
- O Lampião da Esquina
- Sui Generis

== Canada ==
Probably the most comprehensive list and largest collection of Canadian and international LGBT periodicals is at the ArQuives in Toronto. See the following website: Our Collections.

- Gay Globe Magazine Launched in 1998. Montréal.
- Daily Xtra
- Fugues. Montreal: Editions Nitram. ISSN 0831-1625. , launch 1984
- GayCalgary and Edmonton Magazine. (Calgary: GayCalgary) , launch 2003
- The 'Out'port (St. John's: The 'Out'port Magazine)
- Outwords. (Coalition for Lesbian and Gay Rights in Ontario) OCLC 43780256. , Ontar
- Plenitude. (Andrea Routley) ISSN 1929-8080.
- To Be. (To Be Publications) OCLC 61455374. , Ottawa, launch 2002
- Trade: Queer Things. (Trade) ISSN 1492-0018. , Ontario, launch 2000
- The Voice. Kitchener: Voice Magazine.
- Wayves (Halifax: Wayves Collective; ISSN 1713-1057)
- theBUZZ Magazine (Greater Toronto Area)
- PinkPlayMags (Greater Toronto Area)

=== Out of print ===
- abOUT. (Ninth Avenue Media) , Toronto and New York
- Angles. (Vancouver Gay Community Centre Society) ISSN 0824-2100. OCLC 10845159. (1983–1998). There is a detailed digital (PDF) INDEX to the contents of Angles and its predecessor, VGCC News, covering the period 1980 to 1998. Index is titled Angles and VGCC News and is available through Library and Archives Canada's online catalogue, through OCLC's WorldCat, or at the Internet Archive. (A few libraries also have print copies of the index).
- fab (fab Style Quarterly). (Toronto: No Fear Publishing) ISSN 1704-3166. , launch 2006
- GO Info (Ottawa: Gays of Ottawa). ISSN 0315-0151.
- J.D.s (Toronto)
- Le Berdache(PDF). Montréal (Québec): Association pour les droits de la communauté gaie du Québec. ISSN 0704-5719. Retrieved May 19, 2025.
- Le petit Berdache (Montreal)
- Messieurs, mes amours. Montréal (Québec): Les entreprises Normand Vaughan. ISSN 0704-5719.
- OutWords. (Outwords Inc) ISSN 1715-5606. , Manitoba
- Outlooks. Calgary: SuperMarketing. ISSN 1704-7927.
- Perceptions (Saskatoon, Saskatchewan), 1983–2013. (There is also a separately published index to this periodical, in both print and PDF, covering years 1983–2004; check index holdings by some libraries in OCLC WorldCat and note that a copy of the index is also archived at Internet Archive; see also entry for Perceptions (magazine), elsewhere in Wikipedia). NOTE that this periodical title is sometimes given in library catalogues or elsewhere as: Gay and Lesbian Perceptions.
- Rites (Rites pub). ISSN 0828-5802 (Toronto)
- Siren (Toronto: More Sex Please! Press). ISSN 1205-6251.
- The Body Politic (Toronto: Pink Triangle Press). ISSN 0315-3606
- The Church-Wellesley Review. (Pink Triangle Press) ISSN 1483-8281.
- The Gaezette (Atlantic Canada)
- Urban Fitness (Vancouver) (Health & lifestyle title for North American market.)
- Xtra! (Toronto: Pink Triangle Press; ISSN 0829-3384)
  - Xtra Ottawa (Ottawa: Pink Triangle Press; ISSN 1195-6127)
  - Xtra Vancouver (Vancouver: Pink Triangle Press; ISSN 1198-0613)

== China ==
See also separate list at: Hong Kong.

乐点 / 点 = Gay Spot / GS / Gayspot Magazine (Beijing, 2007– ).

One of the longest-running mainland Chinese LGBT periodicals. Note that digital (PDF) archival copies for the period 2007 to 2015 (26 issues) have been posted for preservation to the Internet Archive. The entry as given above notes the various titles, in both simplified Chinese characters and in English, by which this periodical is represented. And yet one additional title form, Le Dian, has also been seen (as the Hanyu pinyin transliterated title).

Femalefield = 女性天地 (1990s?).

Note one archived sample issue of Femalefield at Internet Archive.

Les+ (Beijing, 2005–2013).

Missionary (Beijing, 2018– ).

First issue of Missionary, Sept. 2018, called "Public", created by DaddyGreenBASEMENT and "showcasing a series of personal discussions about male homosexuality in public spaces" (Emma Sun posting, Jan. 16, 2019, radiichina.com).

== Costa Rica ==
- Gente 10 Magazine. (Diseño y Comunicación J&D) ISSN 1409-4959. OCLC 47663266. , San Jose; launch 1994

== Czech Republic ==
- Hlas. 1931–1932
- Kamarad. 1932
- Novy Hlas. 1932–1934
- Hlas prirody. 1938
- Gay kontakt. (Princ Press) OCLC 320412938.
- Princ : gay sex magazín. (Dagra Communication) ISSN 1212-1878. , launch 1993

== Finland ==
- NHL: normihomolehti. (Voima kustannus) ISSN 1799-1811. OCLC 862215921. , Helsinki 2010-
- SQS: Suomen queer-tutkimuksen seuran lehti. (Suomen queer-tutkimuksen seura) ISSN 1796-5551. OCLC 819289697. , Helsinki 2006-

=== Out of print ===
- Homotutkimustiedote. (Kustannusliike Kustannusvastuu) ISSN 1235-6298. , Helsinki 1995
- Queer biz. (Queer Biz) ISSN 1236-5319. , Helsinki 1993–1994
- Seta. (Seksuaalinen tasavertaisuus) ISSN 0355-1407. OCLC 759774391. , Helsinki 1975–1994
- Voltti. (Akilles kustannus) ISSN 1797-4526. , Helsinki 2008–2009
- Z: setalehti. (Seksuaalinen tasavertaisuus) ISSN 1238-2760. OCLC 858654752. , Helsinki 1995–2007

== France ==
- Jeanne Magazine
- Stonewall.fr
- Têtu. (CPPD) ISSN 1265-3578. , 1995-
- Garçon Magazine

=== Out of print ===
- Gai pied. (Éditions du Triangle rose) OCLC 28796721. , 1979–1991
- Illico. (Gollion) OCLC 173961001. , free
- PREF mag. (Levallois) ISSN 1775-8092. , 2004–2011

== Georgia ==
- Me Magazine. (Inclusive Foundation) ISSN 1512-2395. , bilingual (Georgian-English), launch 2006

== Germany ==
- BLU Berlin (gay)
- BLU München (gay)
- EXIT Ruhrgebiet (gay)
- GAB Frankfurt, Rhein/Main (gay)
- Hinnerk. (Hinnerk-Verlag) , Hamburg (gay)
- Invertito. , national (gay & lesbian)
- L-mag Jackwerth Verlag, national (lesbian)
- Queer (German magazine) (gay & lesbian)
- rik Matthei Medien, Cologne (gay)
- Siegessäule. (Magnus-Zeitschriftenverlags) OCLC 29805912. , Berlin (gay & lesbian)

=== Out of print ===
- Das 3. Geschlecht, 1930–32 (trans)
- DU&ICH. (Jackwerth Verlag) OCLC 39941926. , national (gay), 1969–2014
- Blätter für Menschenrecht, literary and scientific, 1923–33
- Der Eigene, art and culture, 1896–1931
- Die Freundschaft, art and culture, 1919–1933
- Die Freundin 1924–1933 (lesbian)
- Frauenliebe 1926–1930 (lesbian)
- Garçonne 1930–1932 (lesbian)
- Die BIF - Blätter Idealer Frauenfreundschaften 1926–1927 (lesbian)
- Gigi – Zeitschrift für sexuelle Emanzipation Förderverein des wissenschaftlich-humanitären komitees (whk) e.V., national (sexually emancipated)
- HAW-Info (or Homosexuelle Aktion Westberlin)
- Homosexuelle Emanzipation Verlag Emanzipation; ISSN 0171-6026
- Die Insel (1926–1933), literary supplement of the Blätter für Menschenrecht
- Die Insel (c. 1950s)
- Jahrbuch für sexuelle Zwischenstufen, scientific, 1899–1923
- Magnus, Magnus Verlag, Jackerth Verlag, national
- Männer. (Bruno Gmünder Verlag) OCLC 31264831. national (gay), 1987–2017

== Greece ==
- Antivirus Magazine (national)

== Hong Kong ==
For a more complete list of current and discontinued Hong Kong LGBT periodicals, see the "Towards Full Citizenship" bibliography (HK LGBT Periodicals section of that list). "Towards Full Citizenship" (5th ed., 2024) is accessible online at this link . (Earlier editions of the bibliography, also carrying periodical lists, can be accessed through Library and Archives Canada's catalogue and via the OCLC WorldCat).

NOTE: several Hong Kong periodicals of the 1990s have been archived to the Internet Archive site. (Click below on Contacts Magazine and on Satsanga Newsletter, which have been linked; note also that digital copies of Hong Kong Ten Percent Journal have also been archived to Internet Archive). Additionally, contents of the three titles noted in the previous sentence have been indexed in a separately published index titled: IN THEIR OWN VOICES, which is electronically available at this link , and also through Library and Archives Canada's online catalogue (Aurora).

Note also some other 1980s and 1990s titles archived as sample issues at Internet Archive (女同誌 ；同志後浪; and one issue each of Pink Triangle and East Tide [see immediately following list for Chinese titles of these last two]).

- "Contacts Magazine". Text primarily in English; magazine published 1993-1998
- Dimsum Magazine, Chinese and English. Began publication ca. 2002; later in electronic format
- Hong Kong Ten Percent Journal, primarily in Chinese, published 1993–1998 (see archived digital PDF copies at Internet Archive)
- East Tide (東壽), ca. 1980
- Pink Triangle (粉紅三角), ca. 1980, continued by East Tide
- "Satsanga Newsletter (同健)". Text primarily in traditional Chinese; magazine published ca.1995-1997

== Hungary ==
- Boxer
- Humen
- Mások ("Others") Lambda Stúdió; ISSN 1215-0134 – Online version (ISSN 1588-1253)
- Na végre! ("About time!") Ráday Music Pub Kft.; ISSN 1787-4556 – Online version ISSN 1787-9507

== India ==
1986 - Anamika - Print Magazine for South Asian lesbians and Bisexual women.

- 1986 - Trikone - South Asian diaspora
- 1989 - Khush Khayal - South Asian
- 1989 - Shakti Khabar - South Asian
- 1990 - Shamakami - For South Asian Lesbian and Bi women
- 1990 - Bombay Dost - Indian gay men (annual print)
- 1990 - Freedom - Gay Newsletter
- 1991 - Pravartak - Indian lgbt magazine
- 1993 - Samiyoni - South Asian lesbians
- 1993 - Aarambh - South Asian LGBT
- 1997 - Darpan - LGBT Newsletter
- 1998 - Scripts - Queer feminist magazine
- 1999 - Sanghamitra - Bangalore LGBT magazine
- 2001 - Lakshya - Gujarati Gay Magazine
- 2004 - Swakanthey - Biannual bengali magazine
- Gaylaxy Hindi. India's first LGBT Hindi webzine, launched 1 January 2014
- Gaylaxy. India's largest LGBT webzine, launched 2010
- Pink Pages. launch July 2009, global quarterly distribution
- Queernama. available online as a pdf and a hardcopy.
- The Gays Today, TGT, is an online magazine first published in January 2023 focusing diverse issues and components of the LGBTQ+ community in India

== Indonesia ==
The following four Indonesian titles are noted by the Australian Gay and Lesbian Archives:

- G: Gaya Hidup Ceria 1982–83
- G.A.Y.A. Nusantara, Jakarta, 1987–?
- JAKA, Yogyakarta, 1986 Dec.–Jan.
- JAKA JAKA, Yogyakarta, 1992–

== Ireland ==
- GCN (Gay Community News). (National Lesbian and Gay Federation (Ireland)) ISSN 0791-7163. , since 1988. The voice of the LGBT+ community in Ireland. A registered charity in Ireland covering all topics for the LGBT+ community and giving a voice to all other LGBT+ organisations in Ireland. Typically monthly but occasionally less due to Covid and financial limitations. Winner of numerous awards in Irish publishing.
- Gay Star. (Northern Ireland Gay Rights Association) OCLC 41114928. Gay Star/update/upstart/Northern Gay were a family of publications covering a range of topics and uses. For example, Gay Star was mainly quarterly and normally ran as an A3 fold over with 24 to 28 pages, providing in depth articles, movie/book/theatre/music reviews, even sometimes poetry. It had some advertising of local events and venues, and also provided advice on medical issues such as AIDs and the Health Clinic location. The other magazines were in a number of formats, A4, A3 fold over and these were often used to get news quickly out to the community and warn them of some kind of possible issue in the gay community e.g. police sting operations, people being beaten up, a predator hunting gay people. A full set of these magazines is located in the Linenhall Library, 17 Donegall Square North Belfast, BT1 5GB, and listings of LGBTQ+ material can be searched on their website https://www.linenhall.com/. It should also be noted that these magazines started off as part of the Northern Ireland Gay Rights Association, but in later years were independent of the organisation, but still supporting the aims and objectives of NIGRA. The two main editors over time were Sean McGouran and Terry McFarlane. Sean is now retired and Terry runs his own website ACOMSDave as a community journalist https://acomsdave.com/

=== Out of print ===
- free! 2002–2006

== Italy ==
- Gayly Planet
- La Falla
- Lui Guidemagazine

=== Out of print ===
- Aut
- Babilonia
- Cassero
- Clubbing
- Fuori. (Fronte unitario omosessuale rivoluzionario italiano) OCLC 27844636. , 1972–1982
- Lambda
- Towanda! (lesbian magazine)
- LIB

== Japan ==
- Barazoku. (Daini Shobō) OCLC 175041284. (薔薇族), launch 1971
- Otoko-machi Map (男街マップ)

=== Out of print ===
- Samson (サムソン), 1982–2020
- BÁdi (バデイ) (Terra Publications), 1994–2019
- G-Men (ジーメン), 1995–2016
- Adon (アドン), 1974–1996
  - MLMW (ムルム), 1978–1981
- Adonisv(アドニス), Yukio Mishima was concerned with foundation of a periodical, 1952–1962
- Anise (アニース)
- Bara (薔薇), launch 1964
- Barakomi (バラコミ), launch 1986
- Carmilla (カーミラ)
- doukou (同好), launch 1959
- Fabulous (ファビュラス), launch 1999
- The Gay (ザ ゲイ), launch 1978
- Kuia Japan – Queer Japan. (Keisō Shobō-2001) OCLC 43906181. , launch 1999
- Niji (虹)
- P-NUTS (P-NUTS), launch 1996
- Sabu (さぶ), 1974–2002
- Super Monkey (スーパーモンキー), launch 1979
- yes (yes), launch 2006

== Jordan ==
- My Kali magazine, launch 2007, a conceptual digital queer publication for/by Middle East, North Africa and diaspora queers.

== Lebanon ==
=== Out of print ===
- Barra

== Mexico ==
- Aguanta Magazine
- Anal Magazine
- Escándala
- Gay PV
- GHOM magazine
- OHM
- Ulisex!Mgzn

=== Out of print ===
- +Kulino
- Apolo
- Boys & Toys
- Del Otro Lado
- [[Diferente (magazine)|Diferente]]
- Hermes
- Macho Tips
- Q-eros
- SerGay

== Nigeria ==
=== Out of print ===
- A Nasty Boy

== The Netherlands ==
- Butt. (Butt Magazine) OCLC 60413051.
- Expreszo. (Amsterdam Stichting Hoezo) ISSN 0921-8556. OCLC 181732025.
- De Gay Krant. (De Gay Krant) ISSN 0922-0003. OCLC 43346480.
- Gay news Amsterdam. (Gay International Press) OCLC 73452069.
- Winq. (Winq Media) ISSN 1871-7985. OCLC 73680690.
- Zij aan zij: kontaktenkrant voor lesbische vrouwen. (Zij aan Zij Kontaktenbank) ISSN 1383-973X. OCLC 428441331.

=== Out of print ===
- Invoice. (2008)
- sQueeze. (Argo Media Groep) ISSN 1385-4682. OCLC 192095429.
- Levensrecht 1940–1946

== Poland ==
- Replika (magazine). (Kampania Przeciw Homofobii (2005–2011), Fundacja Replika (since 2011)) ISSN 1896-3617. OCLC 759913113.

== The Philippines ==
- Outrage magazine
- TEAM magazine

== Russia ==
- Ostrov (Olgerta Kharitonova)

=== Out of print ===
- Kvir transl. Queer (2003-2012)

== Serbia ==
- Optimist magazine. (Gay Lesbian Info Center) ISSN 2217-6756.

=== Out of print ===
- Dečko magazine
- Pride magazine

== Singapore ==
- Element Magazine

=== Out of print ===
- Manazine

== Slovenia ==
- GEJM. (DIC Legebitra) ISSN 2670-4471.

=== Out of print ===
- Narobe. (DIC Legebitra) ISSN 1854-8474.
- 1xy. (Škuc Magnus)
- eLmagazin. (MKC Maribor)
- Lesbo. (Škuc LL) OCLC 442867867.
- Kekec. (Škuc Magnus)
- Legebitrina Oznanila. (Legebitra)
- Revolver. (Škuc) ISSN 1318-2668.
- Sestre.

== South Korea ==
- Buddy magazine

== Spain ==
- Entiendes? 1989– ISSN 1575-1635
- Gay Hotsa, bilingual Basque and Spanish, OCLC 289381704
- MagLes magazine
- Shangay magazine
- Zero (out of business)

Out of print

"Dunas Mag " - Gay Magazine in Maspalomas and Gran Canaria (in English / every 3 months).

== Sweden ==
- QX

=== Out of print ===
- Destroyer. (Karl Andersson) ISSN 1801-8203. , launched May 2006, global quarterly distribution, ceased publication in January 2010

== Switzerland ==
- Milchbüechli von Milchjugend

=== Out of print ===
- Anderschume - Kontiki. (1985–1993). ISSN 0259-5419
- Der Kreis = Le Circle = The Cercle. (1933–1967) Zurich. OCLC 183225766

== Taiwan ==
- Blue Man magazine
- Blue Men magazine
- G & L Passion magazine
- Good Guy magazine
- Style Men magazine
- Tung Yen Wu Chi (Eng: "Gays Speak Out")

== Thailand ==
See the Australian National University project website for many archived Thai LGBT periodicals in electronic format. ThaiRainbowArchive: Catalogue

== Turkey ==
- Kaos GL. (Kaos GL) ISSN 1302-5015. OCLC 40536771. , published quarterly by the LGBT organization KAOS GL
- Parmak (Finger). (Ali Özbaş) OCLC 64771242. , published monthly by KAOS GL during 2001

== Uganda ==
- Bombastic, online and print magazine. The first seven issues (2014–2023) have been archived in PDF format at the Internet Archive, entered there under title: Bombastic Magazine [Uganda] . See additional related information at the website: www.kuchutimes.com

== United Kingdom ==
- Attitude. (Stream Publishing) ISSN 1353-1875.
- Bent. (APN UK Ltd.) Online magazine, formerly a free monthly print magazine (until April 2012), from the organisers of Mr Gay UK
- BCN (Bi Community News). (Bi Community News) ISSN 1757-6938.
- Diva. (Diva Media Group Ltd) ISSN 1353-4912.
- FS Magazine. (GMFA) ISSN 1750-7162. Official free magazine of the LGBTQ+ health and wellbeing organization LGBT Hero
- Fyne Times. (Fyne Associates) OCLC 226209727.
- Galha News. (Gay and Lesbian Humanist Association) ISSN 0953-8763.
- Gay Times. (Gay Times Ltd) ISSN 0950-6101.
- GScene. (Gscene Magazine CIC) Free monthly LGBTQ+ lifestyle magazine for the UK's South Coast
- Midlands Rainbow. Free LGBTQ+ online magazine for Birmingham, West Midlands and East Midlands
- OutThere. (OutThere Publishing Ltd / OutThere LLC) ISSN 2633-0539.
- PinkNews
- Pride Life. (Pride Life Ltd)
- QB - Nottinghamshire's Queer Bulletin.
- QueerAF
- Sassify Zine. (Tales of Black Eyed Jack)
- Somewhere: For Us: The LGBTQ+ arts, culture, heritage and enterprise magazine for Scotland
- TheGayUK. (Pineapple Rock Ltd.)
- UnDividingLines Free independent online LGBT+ magazine for the Highlands and Islands of Scotland.
- Vada Magazine. (Dog Horn Publishing) Online lifestyle magazine, based in Manchester; edited by Adam Lowe (writer)
- We Are Family magazine. (We Are Family magazine Ltd)

=== Out of print ===
- Boyz. (Windmill Europe Ltd) ISSN 1750-7944.
- Films and Filming. (Hansom Books)
- Action! (Action Newspaper Group) "The European Gay Newspaper for Men", distributed in Britain, France, Belgium, Holland.
- AXM. (Hallmark Communications) ISSN 1473-0529. , previously Axiom
- Bona.
- B-SPOKE. (Xclusive Media) ISSN 1756-7661.
- Capital Gay. (Stonewall Press Ltd) OCLC 27313453.
- Chroma: A Queer Literary Journal. (Queer Writers and Poets) ISSN 1744-7801. , literary and arts journal
- Fitlads. (David and Joe Ltd) ISSN 1757-5516. , free
- Fluid. (Chronos Publishing) ISSN 1468-5051.
- g3. (Squarepeg Media)
- Gay News. (Robert Palmer Marketing Ltd) OCLC 28143665. closed 15 April 1983, now formally part of Gay Times
- Gay Scotland. (SHRG)
- Man Magazine. (Man Media (UK)) ISSN 1741-671X. , North West, 2000–2004
- Midlands Zone. (What's On Magazine Group) Free monthly lifestyle magazine (1997-2020.)
- Mirrorballs. (MB Publications)
- Outback. (Self-published)
- OUTburst: Schools OUT UK's Official Guide to LGBT History Month. (Sugar Media & Marketing/Schools OUT UK) Free annual listings and lifestyle magazine for LGBT+ History Month UK
- Outcast. (Outcast Publishing) ISSN 1469-624X.
- Out in the City. (Squarepeg Media)
- OutNorthWest. (The Lesbian & Gay Foundation)
- Phase. (Blasé Ltd) ISSN 1352-819X.
- The Pink Paper. (Millivres Prowler Limited) , 1987–2009 (printed)
- Queer West News. (Craig Denney) (free regional LGBT newsletter), closed 2008
- The Quorum. , single issue in 1920
- QX. (FirstStar, Ltd) ISSN 1356-6903. , closed 2021
- Rouge Magazine. closed ca. 1995.
- Scene Update/Update International. (Virtual Universe) ISSN 1367-1766.
- ScotsGay. (John Hein)
- Shebang. closed 1995.
- Shout!. (Outright Scotland) OCLC 166588709. , Outright newsletter 1990s
- Square Peg. (BM Square Peg) OCLC 19984198. , closed, ran 1983–1992
- Visible. (Marsh and Malone Group) ISSN 1748-9709. (online) ISSN 1748-9717

== United States ==
=== National news and information ===
- Blaque/OUT Magazine. (issuu.com/blaqueoutmag) , covering Black and Brown, Queer and Trans culture
- The Advocate. (LPI Media) ISSN 0001-8996.
- biMagazine. (American Institute of Bisexuality) , covering the arts, culture and society
- Compete Magazine. (Media Out Loud LLC) , coverage of sports events and stories about athletes within the gay community
- EDGE Media Network. (EDGE Publications Inc.) , covering national news, entertainment and lifestyle
- The Gay & Lesbian Review Worldwide. (Gay & Lesbian Review, Inc) ISSN 1532-1118.
- GaySOFLA Magazine Online. , South Florida
- Hornet Stories. (Hornet App)
- Lesbian News. (Ella Matthes, LN Publishing Inc.) (Jinx Beers, founder)
- LGBT-Today.com. (Gay Nichols Publishing, LLC) , covering LGBT activism from the intelligent view
- LGBTQ Nation.
- National Gay News. (Norm E. Kent)
- OMG! Magazine. (OMG Multimedia Companies, LLC)
- Out Front. (Q Publishing Group)
- Pink Magazine. (David Cohen)
- Queer'd Magazine. (Queerd Entertainment)
- XY (XY Publishing; ISSN 1522-8614)

==== Regional ====
- ACCESSline Newspaper. (ACCESS) OCLC 26340233. , launch 1986
- ADELANTE Magazine. (Adelante Publishing Corporation) , Los Angeles, launch 1998
- Ambush Magazine. (Baton Rouge, Louisiana) OCLC 10903339. , Southeast
- Baltimore OUTloud
- Atlanta Barb/The Barb. (Ray Greene, later Bill Smith) OCLC 1249024918. , Southeast, ran from 1974-1977.
- Bay Area Reporter. (Benro Enterprises) OCLC 26378505. , San Francisco
- San Francisco Bay Times. (Sullivan Communications, Inc) , San Francisco, launched 1978
- LGBTQ San Diego County News. (MGW Media, LLC), San Diego, California. Founded as Gay San Diego in 2010, and rebranded in 2019.
- Bay Windows. (Alyson Publications) ISSN 0883-4334. , New England, launched 1983
- Between the Lines. (Pride Source Media Group) ISSN 1080-7551. , Detroit, launched 1993
- Boom Magazine, Midwest, localized in St. Louis, launched 2014
- Boston Spirit Magazine. , Greater Boston and New England
- Bulletin, The. (Triangle Media) ISSN 0889-6593. , California
- CampKC. (CampOut) OCLC 86069284. , Kansas City Metropolitan Area
- Chicago Phoenix. (Merewell LLC) , Illinois
- City News Los Angeles. OCLC 12056628. , Los Angeles
- cityXtra Magazine (Central and North Florida), published since 2010
- Connect. (S&L Companies, LLC), Middle Tennessee, launched January 2021
- Dallas Voice. (Voice Publishing) ISSN 0888-2517. , Dallas, Texas
- David Atlanta. (David Atlanta Inc.) OCLC 72899775. , Atlanta, Georgia
- David Magazine. (Mark Henry Enterprises, Inc.) OCLC 31911088. , Jacksonville, Florida 1970–1978 Fort Lauderdale, Florida 1978–1998
- Diversity Rules Magazine. OCLC 319832008. , Oneonta, New York
- Element Q magazine. , Albany, New York
- The Empty Closet. (Gay Alliance of Genesee Valley) , Rochester, New York
- Erie Gay News. ISSN 2159-1792. OCLC 694108900. , Erie, Pennsylvania, launch 1992
- EscapeOKC Magazine. , Oklahoma City
- Family & Friends Magazine. (A & P Publications) , Memphis, Tennessee
- Fenuxe Magazine. (TW Media Group, LLC) ISSN 2157-006X. OCLC 72899775. , Atlanta, Georgia
- The Fight. (Third Step) , Los Angeles, California
- FLAME Magazine. (FM Media Group, LLC) , New Orleans, Louisiana
- Focus Mid-South. (Ray Rico Freelance, LLC) , Memphis, Tennessee | launch September 2015
- Frontiers. (Frontiers Media) ISSN 1526-1972. , launch 1981
- GAY CHIC Magazine. (Viral PR Agency, LLC) , Chicago, Illinois, Launch 2013
- Gay City News. (Community Media) OCLC 50274748. , New York, launch 1994 originally as Lesbian Gay New York.
- Gay Life. (GLCCB) , Baltimore, Maryland
- Gay People's Chronicle. (KWIR Publications) ISSN 1070-177X. , Ohio, launch 1985
- Gay Vegas. (All Purple Durple) Las Vegas, Nevada, launched 1997, print and online magazine, digital version found at gayvegas.com
- Gayzette. (Coast to Coast) OCLC 54477955. , Florida
- Gayzette. (District 202) OCLC 50756390. , Minnesota
- Gayzette. (Gay and Lesbian Democrats) OCLC 28596908. , Denver, Colorado
- Gayzette. (Society for Senior Gay and Lesbian Citizens) OCLC 52935673. , California
- GO NYC. (Go NYC Media) OCLC 54069461. , New York, Lesbian oriented
- Gossip Boy. , Oklahoma City, Oklahoma
- GRAB. (Grabbys, LLC) , Chicago, Illinois
- Hotspots Magazine. (Hotspots Media Group) OCLC 1138961962. launched 1985, Central and South Florida
- Houston Voice (1973-2009). (T. Nelson (H. McClurg 1973-1993)) OCLC 31485329. , Texas, originally known as the Montrose Star
- Houston Voice (2011-present). (J. Galloway & S. Tilota) ISSN 2164-9243. , Texas, revived version of Houston Voice
- IN2IT Magazine. , Texas
- InsideOut Weekly. (Nashville, Tennessee)
- ION Arizona. (JMT Designs, Inc.) , free, Arizona, launched originally as IONAZ in 2001
- Lambda Magazine. , launched 1976, Chapel Hill, North Carolina
- Lavender Magazine. Minneapolis/St. Paul, Minnesota, launched in 1995, free
- Liberty Press, The. (The Liberty Press) OCLC 34715465. , launch 1994, Kansas
- Los Angeles Blade. (Alexander Rodriguez) OCLC 1456441792. , Greater Los Angeles
- Metro Weekly. (Isosceles) OCLC 55969798. , free, launch 1994, Washington D.C.
- Mom...Guess What! Newsmagazine. (Guess What Media) OCLC 73351731. , launched 1978, Sacramento, California
- Next Magazine (New York City)
- OKAY!Q Social, The only Social Media for the LGBTQ Community
- ON Magazine. (Media Mojo) (San Francisco Bay Area/Silicon Valley)
- Options (Rhode Island and Southeastern Massachusetts)
- Our Lives. (Madison, Wisconsin)
- Out & About Newspaper (Nashville, Tennessee)
- Out Front Colorado (Denver)
- Out In Jersey magazine, The statewide LGBT publication in New Jersey
- Out on the Town (Florida Panhandle, Alabama, Mississippi, Arkansas, Louisiana)
- OUTCOAST (Gay Florida Travel Magazine)
- Out Living Magazine (New Orleans)
- Out Living Magazine, New Orleans LGBTQ+ Lifestyle & Community Magazine, launched in 2022.
- Outlook Arizona. (Outlook Arizona, LLC) (Phoenix, Arizona)
- Outlook Columbus (Columbus, Ohio) (Outlook Media)
- OutSmart Magazine Houston's award-winning LGBT publication, launched in 1994
- Outwrite Newsmagazine (University of California, Los Angeles)
- Palm Springs Desert Daily Guide Weekly. (DDG MEDIA GROUP Will Paige/Adrian Ayala) OCLC 54477925. , oldest gay magazine in Palm Springs, California, launched 1994
- Panzee Press. (Panzee Press, LLC) (Harrisburg, Pennsylvania)
- Philadelphia Gay News. (Masco Communications, Inc) (Philadelphia, Pennsylvania)
- Pop Scene Magazine. (Pop life press, LLC) (New York City)
- The Pride LA. , Greater Los Angeles
- PRIZM News (Ohio) [Prizm exists to connect LGBTQ+ people across Ohio to a statewide community] (Prizm News)
- Q Magazine, Key West, Florida
- QVegas. (Las Vegas, Nevada) (VGM LLC)
- Q-Notes. (Pride Publishing & Typesetting) Charlotte, North Carolina, North Carolina, South Carolina
- The Rage Monthly, SoCal's largest and longest-serving LGBTQ magazine
- The Rainbow Times, largest LGBT newspaper in New England
- QSaltLake (Salt Lake City, Utah) (Salt Lick Publishing)
- Queer Life. (Milwaukee, Wisconsin)
- Queer Sacramento. (Sacramento, California)
- Queertopia. (QueerInk, LLC) (Minneapolis, Minnesota, Wisconsin, Iowa, Minnesota, Illinois, Michigan, North Dakota, South Dakota)
- Rainbow Pages (Southwest Florida) Free, LGBTQ News, Resources, Events
- The Rainbow Times (Boston) (The Rainbow Times, LLC; ISSN 2169-6128)
- Seattle Gay News. (Seattle, Washington)
- South Florida Gay News (SFGN), Fort Lauderdale, Florida (SouthFloridaGayNews.com, Inc.)
- SPLASH. (Naples/Fort Myers/Sarasota, Florida)
- SPOTS.
- therepubliq, online LGBTQ+ publication based in Austin, Texas, launched in 2009
- Trade : queer things. (Trade) ISSN 1492-0018. , Ontario
- Triangle journal news. (Printers' Ink) OCLC 28824568. , Memphis, Tennessee
- United We Stand – Kentucky's LGBTI News, Richmond, Kentucky (United We Stand Media, LLC.)
- Washington Blade (Washington, D.C.) (Brown Naff Pitts Omnimedia, Inc; ISSN 0278-9892)
- Watermark & Watermark Online, over 20 years as central Florida's only LGBT news source (Florida)
- The Western Express (Phoenix, Arizona) (Tucson, Arizona)
- What's Happening Magazine (Florida)
- Windy City Times (Windy City Media Group; ISSN 1049-698X)
- Wire Magazine (Florida)
- Wisconsin Gazette (Wisconsin)

=== Lifestyle ===
- A Bear's Life Magazine (Bear Brothers)
- Connextions Magazine. (Connextions Magazine LLC) ISSN 2160-4355.
- Cakeboy Magazine
- Curve (Outspoken Enterprises; ISSN 1087-867X)
- Echo Magazine (ACE Publishing)
- Elska (ISSN 2059-707X), a bi-monthly gay photography and culture publication, each issue dedicated to a different city, with local boys and local stories
- Envy Man (Envy Media Group)
- FTM Magazine (The Self Made Men LLC)
- Hello Mr. (ISSN 2201-8220)
- Gay Parent Magazine (Gay Parent; ISSN 1545-6714)
- GayWebMoney Magazine
- Lavender Magazine (Lavender Lifestyles Marketing; ISSN 1542-3611)
- LGBT Living & Weddings Magazine
- MetroSource (Metrosource Publishing, Inc.; ISSN 1529-935X )
- My Comrade
- Next Door Magazine
- noiZe Magazine (The Premier Guide to Dance, Festival and Circuit Events Worldwide; ISSN 1944-5741 )
- OMG! Magazine (publisher= OMG Multimedia Companies, LLC)
- Out (LPI Media; ISSN 1062-7928)
- OUTCOAST (Travel and Event Marketing Services for Florida's Gulf Coast)
- OUT THERE (publisher= Brown Tiger; ISSN 2043-9210)
- Pride & Equality Magazine
- Qr Magazine (Qr Media; ISSN 2027-9531)
- Queerd
- R* (evedesasas; ISSN 1948-5042)
- The Rainbow Times, New England's LGBT largest LGBT newspaper; available as print or online.
- RFD Magazine (RFD Press Inc.; ISSN 0149-709X)
- 10 Thousand Couples, free online emagazine that publishes articles, editorials, news, and video content of particular interest to same-sex couples, unions, and domestic partners around the globe
- She Magazine (She Girls, LLC)
- TENz Magazine (Sailey Williams Media, LLC)
- Transgender Tapestry. (I.F.G.E) ISSN 1083-0006. OCLC 32692689.
- Velvetpark (Velvetpark Magazine; ISSN 1540-3777)
- VizionsMagazine.NET (QNA Media Group, LLC)
- Xodus USA (Xodus USA; ISSN 1542-2755)
- Zeus (Fenocia Publishing Company, Inc; ISSN 1948-5042)

=== Health ===
- POZ Magazine. (Smart + Strong) ISSN 1075-5705. , launched 1994

=== Travel ===
- Connextions Magazine. (Connextions Magazine LLC) ISSN 2160-4355.
- Passport Magazine. (Q Communications) ISSN 1531-0213.
- OUTCOAST (Gay Florida Travel Magazine)

=== Out of print ===
- abOUT (Toronto, Buffalo)
- After Dark
- Anything That Moves
- Bear Magazine (Brush Creek Media; ISSN 1049-6521)
- Black Lace (BLK Publishing Co.; ISSN 1049-3298)
- Blackfire (BLK Publishing Co.; ISSN 1049-3271)
- BLK (Los Angeles, California) (BLK Publishing Co.; ISSN 1043-0075)
- Chicago Free Press. (Novus Publishing) OCLC 42850110.
- Christopher Street
- Church Street Freedom Press (Nashville, TN, published by Freedom Press Publishing)
- Come Out! New York City, published by the Gay Liberation Front
- DRUM (Philadelphia) 1964–1967, published by the Janus Society
- DYKE: A Quarterly New York 1975-1979, published by Tomato Publications
- Esto No Tiene Nombre, Revista de Lesbianas Latinas
- Fag Rag 1971 - c. 1987, published by Boston-based Fag Rag Collective
- Focus Middle Tennessee. (Ray Rico Freelance, LLC) , Nashville, Tennessee, launch June 2017
- Gay Chicago Magazine. (Merewell, Inc.)
- Gay Community News (Boston/Cambridge, Massachusetts) (Bromfield Street Educational Foundation; ISSN 0147-0728)
- The Gay News-Telegraph, published in St. Louis, Missouri
- Gaysweek (New York City) (New York Gay News, Inc.; ISSN 0145-9104)
- Genre (Genre Publishing; ISSN 1074-5246)
- Girlfriends (Girlfriends Magazine; ISSN 1078-8875)
- Hero
- Homocore
- Kuumba (BLK Publishing Co.; ISSN 1049-328X)
- The Ladder
- LivingOUT (Minneapolis/St. Paul, Minnesota) (LivingOUT Media)
- The New York Blade
- ONE magazine (Los Angeles, 1953) first gay publication in the United States.
- Out Las Vegas. (Stonewall Publishing) (Las Vegas metropolitan area, Nevada)
- Out Traveler, once provided as a supplement to LPI Media publications like Out Magazine and The Advocate; no longer in publication
- OutWeek
- The Phoenix: Midwest Homophile Voice (Kansas City, Missouri), published by The Phoenix Society for Individual Freedom
- QQ Magazine, national bimonthly lifestyle magazine, 1969 – ca. 1982, from Queen's Quarterly Pub. Co in New York City. Started as Queens Quarterly and used the motto: For gay guys who have no hangups
- Quest (Green Bay, Wisconsin) as of 2018
- Salt Lake Metro (Salt Lake City, Utah) (Metro Publishing)
- SHOUT Texas Magazine.
- Southern Voice
- Transvestia (Los Angeles, 1952–1986) Chevalier Publications
- Venus, (Atlanta, Georgia; Hastings on Hudson, New York), published by Cothran Publications
- Vice Versa
- Vital Voice, life and style magazine celebrating the St. Louis, Missouri, and Midwest LGBT community
- Instinct (1997–2015)

=== Scholarly ===
- Gai Saber. Auréville: Les Dames. ISSN 0047-4916.
- Gay Books Bulletin. (Gay Academic Union, NY Chapter) ISSN 1043-383X.
- Gay Literature. (D. Curzon) ISSN 0193-838X.
- GLQ: A Journal of Lesbian and Gay Studies. (Duke University Press) OCLC 759829458.
- The Harvard Gay & Lesbian Review. (Harvard Gay & Lesbian Caucus) ISSN 1077-6591.
- International Journal of Transgenderism (IJT). (Symposion Publishing) ISSN 1434-4599.
- Journal of Bisexuality. (Haworth Press) ISSN 1529-9716. , online version ISSN 1529-9724
- Journal of Gay & Lesbian Issues in Education. (Harrington Park Press) ISSN 1541-0889. , online version ISSN 1541-0870
- Journal of Gay & Lesbian Politics. ISSN 1537-9426.
- Journal of Homosexuality. (Haworth Press {originally and now Routledge/Taylor & Francis Group}) ISSN 0091-8369. , online version ISSN 1540-3602
- Law and Sexuality. (Tulane University School of Law) ISSN 1062-0680.
- Lesbian Review of Books. (The Lesbian Review of Books) ISSN 1077-5684.
- National Journal of Sexual Orientation Law. ISSN 1552-8901.
- Psychology of Sexualities Review (British Psychological Society) ISSN 2047-1467, online version ISSN 2047-1475
- Psychology of Sexual Orientation and Gender Diversity. (American Psychological Association) ISSN 2329-0382. , online version ISSN 2329-0390
- Transgender Studies Quarterly. (Duke University Press) ISSN 2328-9252

=== Historical research resources ===
- International Directory of Gay and Lesbian Periodicals (Oryx Press, 1987), ISBN 0-89774-297-4
- Lesbian Periodicals Index (1986), ISBN 0-930044-74-6
- Lesbian Sources: A Bibliography of Periodical Articles, 1970–1990 (1993), ISBN 0-8153-0782-9
- Our Own Voices: A Directory of Lesbian and Gay Periodicals, 1890–1990: Including the Complete Holdings of the Canadian Gay Archives (Canadian Gay Archives, 1991), ISBN 0-9690981-6-2
- Women's and Lesbian, Gay, Bisexual, and Transgender Movements (LGBT) Periodicals Collection, 1968–2005, Rare Book, Manuscript, and Special Collections Library, Duke University

== See also ==
- Beefcake magazines
- List of gay pornographic magazines
- List of lesbian periodicals
