= Vic Gerami =

American journalist

- Occupations: Journalist; LGBT activist and columnist
- Website: thebluntpost.com

Vic Gerami is an Armenian-American journalist, LGBT activist, and columnist based in Los Angeles, California. He is the host and producer of the radio show The Blunt Post with Vic and the editor and publisher of The Blunt Post.

== Career ==
A noted columnist, Gerami is a journalist and media contributor who is also publisher and editor of The Blunt Post.

He spent six years at Frontiers, followed by LA Weekly and Voice Media Group. His syndicated celebrity Questions & Answer column, 10 Questions with Vic, was a finalist for LA Press Club's National Arts & Entertainment Journalism Award in 2017.

Gerami is also the host and producer of his show, The Blunt Post with Vic on Public Radio KPFK 90.7 FM 90.7 FM.

Gerami began his career at Frontiers Magazine, followed by positions at LA Weekly and Voice Media Group. He has twice been a finalist in the Los Angeles Press Club’s National Arts and Entertainment Journalism Awards “Columnist of the Year” category, in 2017 and 2019. His celebrity Q&A column, ‘10 Questions with Vic‘ is internationally syndicated.

Gerami is a contributor to the LGBTQ San Diego County News, Windy City Times, Houston Voice, DC Life Magazine, Out & About Nashville, Q Virginia, GNI MAG, QNotes, GoWeHo, Asbarez, The California Courier, Desert Daily Guide, Armenian Weekly, GED, The Pride LA, IN Magazine, Out Traveler, The Fight Magazine and The Advocate, among others.

He wrote and directed the 2022 documentary Motherland on the 2020 Nagorno-Karabakh war.

== LGBTQ+ advocacy ==
In 2009, Gerami was described in The Wall Street Journal as a "leading gay activist in West Hollywood", and later commended for his opposition to Prop 8 and advocacy for marriage equality by the Los Angeles Blade. He was on the planning committee of Resist March 2017 and is a founding board member of Equality Armenia.

== See also ==
- LGBT rights in Armenia
- Recognition of same-sex unions in Armenia
