= Out & About =

Out & About may refer to:

- Out & About (newsletter), New York travel newsletter for gay and lesbian travelers
- Out & About Newspaper, a monthly LGBT newspaper in Nashville, Tennessee
- Out and About (Cherish the Ladies album), 1993
- Out and About (Steve Swell album), 1996
- Out & About, an album by Bronski Beat, recorded in 1987 but unreleased until 2016
- "Out and About", 1967 song by Boyce and Hart
- Out'n'About, American bed and breakfast company
- Out and About with the Gone Jackals, 1990 album by The Gone Jackals
