= Die Insel =

Die Insel is German for "the island". It may refer to:

- The Island (1934 film), a 1934 German film
- Die Insel (magazine, 1899–1901), a German literary magazine
- Die Insel (magazine, 1926–1933), a German homosexual magazine
- Die Insel (magazine, 1950s), a German homophile magazine
