= Rollercoaster (Jim Verraros album) =

American pop-rock album

Studio album by Jim Verraros
- Released: April 26, 2005
- Genres: Pop rock; dance
- Length: 40:29
- Label: Koch Records
- Producer: Gabe Lopez

Jim Verraros chronology
Unsaid and Understood (2003)	''Rollercoaster'' (2005)	Do Not Disturb (2011)

Singles from Rollercoaster
- 1. "You Turn It On"; 2. "You're Getting Crazy (Estas Enloqueciendo)"

Rollercoaster is the official debut album of pop rock-dance artist Jim Verraros. It was released by independent label Koch Records on April 26, 2005. Several of the album's songs had been featured on a previous release by Verraros, titled Unsaid and Understood, which had acted as a demo album. Unsaid and Understood had been self-released in 2003, a year after Verraros placed ninth on American Idol's first season, and had drawn the attention of Koch Records, which proceeded to sign Verraros. Gabe Lopez produced Unsaid and Understood as well as Rollercoaster. He also provided backing vocals and played several instruments on both albums. Among Rollercoaster's other background vocalists is Angela Peel, who made it to the semi-finals on American Idol, during the same season as Verraros.

Verraros had publicly come out as gay the year before releasing Unsaid and Understood and was the only openly gay finalist from American Idol at the time of Rollercoaster's release. He performed many of the songs on Rollercoaster at gay clubs and at pride events. All of the songs on the album avoid using pronouns, and the album was noted for including lyrics that allude to both gay bashing and gay sex. Verraros sought to create a more sexually charged album than those released by other American Idol finalists up to that point. The music of George Michael served as the album's primary influence, while Green Day inspired some of the album's rock elements.

"You Turn It On" was released as Rollercoaster's first single and peaked at number twenty-one on the Billboard Dance Club Play Chart. "You're Getting Crazy (Estas Enloqueciendo)" was released in October 2005 as the album's second single. Both songs received multiple remixes. Prior to Rollercoaster's release, songs from Unsaid and Understood topped the Rock and Pop charts on Mp3.com.

Lopez received writing credits for all eleven tracks on Rollercoaster. Verraros co-wrote seven of the album's songs, and Peel co-wrote four of them. Peel's credits include co-writing both of the album's singles.

Reviews of Rollercoaster were generally positive, both in mainstream and LGBT-interest publications. Critics complimented the album's musical influences and gay-oriented themes.

== Background ==
After placing ninth on American Idol's first season, Jim Verraros moved to Los Angeles, where he was cast in the LGBT independent comedy film Eating Out. Around the same time, he connected with Gabe Lopez, a singer-songwriter and music producer based in that area. Lopez had heard American Idol: Greatest Moments, a compilation album that Verraros had been featured on, and wanted to begin a collaboration. The two of them worked out of Lopez's home studio. A demo album resulted, titled Unsaid and Understood, which Verraros and Lopez self-released in 2003.

As the first, and at that point, only American Idol finalist to be out publicly, Verraros had already been the recipient of significant media attention from the LGBT press; Out magazine had named him as one of "2002's Most Intriguing People". When Unsaid and Understood was released, The Advocate's Adam B. Vary named it as one of his favorite new indie albums in the LGBT music scene. Individual songs from Unsaid and Understood topped mp3.com's Rock and Pop charts, and one of the album's songs, "I Want You", was featured on Bi the People, a 2003 compilation album of "bisexual artists and friends", which was released to raise money for the Bisexual Foundation. Unsaid and Understood won the 2004 Out Music Award for Outstanding New Recording – Debut Male and was supported through a tour of gay clubs.

Despite the traction that Verraros was gaining within the LGBT community – the Chicago Sun-Times called him a "gay icon" in 2004 – he was unable to convince any major labels, either in the United States or in the United Kingdom, to release Unsaid and Understood. Struggling financially, Verraros continued working at a tanning salon, where he had found employment shortly after moving to LA. Over the summer of 2004, he learned that Koch Records, an indie label based out of New York, was preparing a compilation album of music by American Idol finalists. Koch Records wanted to know whether Verraros had anything to contribute to the planned album, and Verraros sent in a demo tape. He received a record deal within a week.

Unsaid and Understood was then retooled as Rollercoaster. Several of the same songs are featured on both albums, although Rollercoaster also features new material.

== Writing and recording ==
Verraros first began working on the album that would become Rollercoaster in June 2003 and finished it about a year and a half later. He and Lopez wrote around thirty-five to forty songs and selected eleven of those to include as tracks on the final album. Angela Peel, who placed in the top thirty of American Idol's first season, co-wrote four of the album's songs (Note: Peel's writing credits include singles "You Turn It On" and "You're Getting Crazy (Estas Enloqueciendo)", as well as the song "Move".) and provided backing vocals, while Lopez received writing credits on all of the tracks (Verraros is credited as a co-writer on seven tracks). Lopez played several instruments on the album (Note: Lopez played acoustic guitar, electric guitar, bass guitar, synthesizer bass, piano, and harmonica on Rollercoaster.) and is credited as the producer. He also provided backing vocals. Rollercoaster was produced on a budget of $3,500.

Verraros explained that the title Rollercoaster is a reference to the emotional highs and lows that he had experienced throughout his life. He also attributed the title to the album's mixture of "dancey upbeat songs" and "romantic, soulful ballads". In several interviews, Verraros cited George Michael as his primary musical influence. He also drew inspiration while working on the album from Justin Timberlake, Janet Jackson, Tina Turner, Prince, and Green Day. Rollercoaster is a pop rock album with a dance component. The Windy City Times described it as a blend of "smoldering rock and funky pop".

Verraros said that he wanted Rollercoaster to be "edgier and sexier" than most albums that had been released by other American Idol participants up to that point. Contrasting himself with Clay Aiken, Verraros said, "[Aiken is] very much a cookie cutter image of what's very safe, vanilla and that's not really me." Verraros noted that while people who win American Idol tend to be "box[ed]" into recording music with mass commercial appeal, his own lower placement in the competition allowed him greater freedom with artistic risks.

"I wrote that about being gay bashed for a long time. I didn't have it easy at all. Being overweight and quite a bit more effeminate than the guys in my age group, I was a gymnast for seven years and on the cheerleading squad as a mascot. I did things I loved even though they were deemed gay or whatever, but all of a sudden [ the abuse ] got so bad I stopped being a gymnast and gained more weight. And I wasn't even out! I didn't understand how I could be pinpointed for something I wasn't even ready to tell the world yet."

— Jim Verraros on the inspiration for "Outside".

Recognizing that his chance to record Rollercoaster had been granted, in large part, by his reality TV show fame, Verraros said that he "had a lot to prove" on the album. Rollercoaster's release strategy depended upon word of mouth, particularly within the LGBT community. Verraros said that the gay press "really carried" him, but also expressed regret that the album received niche marketing, saying in a 2006 interview, "It's just become very gay-focused...they [Koch Records] were going to capitalize on the gay market and [said] 'we're going to get you in the gay clubs and we're going to do it gay, gay, gay.' And I was like, 'My album isn't really all that gay and it's totally mainstream, top 40. A lot of girls will dig it too. So that's kind of stupid but just do it.'"

Lyrics were written without the use of pronouns, so as to appeal to both gay and straight listeners. Verraros called "Outside" the most personal song on Rollercoaster, as well as one of his favorites, and explained that the lyrics are about gay bashing. Another song on the album, "Welcome to Hollywood", was described by The Advocate as "[documenting Verarros'] post-Idol reality check". When asked about the song, Verraros described Hollywood as a "seedy" place, filled with people trying to "get ahead in life". In a separate interview, he said that he had "to constantly question other people's motives" while living in Los Angeles. (Note: He nonetheless voiced appreciation for the area's progressive culture in another interview held around this time, noting that he had experienced less homophobia since moving there.) "You're Getting Crazy" and "Hold On" were also singled out by Verraros as two of his favorite songs on the album, the former for its "beat" and the latter for its romantic qualities.

== Release ==
Rollercoaster was initially scheduled for a March 2005 release, although the date was postponed to April 26 of that year. The album's release date was chosen to roughly coincide with the theatrical premiere of Eating Out. A release party for Rollercoaster was held on April 27, 2005 at the Roxy Theatre in Hollywood. A club tour was considered to promote the album, and through the rest of 2005, Verraros performed in several pride events. He also performed at the American Idol season 4 wrap party that May. Following Rollercoaster's release, Verraros moved back to his hometown of Crystal Lake, Illinois, where he was involved with several local events.

== Singles ==
Rollercoaster's first single, "You Turn It On", debuted at number forty-eight on the Billboard Dance Club Play Chart. The song spent eleven weeks on that chart and peaked in early June at number twenty-one. Remixes were created for the song.

The album's second single, "You're Getting Crazy (Estas Enloqueciendo)", was released in October. Mike Cruz and L.E.X each created remixes of the song, which were called "as slick, upbeat and professional as anything else currently climbing the charts" by Edgemedianetwork.com. Billboard suggested that with the help of an accompanying music video, the song would have the potential to become a hit, but no music videos were created for any of the songs on Rollercoaster, and the album's second single failed to chart.

== Reception ==
"The original American Idol top 10 Finalist sings with true passion and bracing maturity--his "So Deep" is so dirty even Xtina would blush."

— Adam B. Vary, reviewing Unsaid and Understood for The Advocate.

Rollercoaster received positive comments from several publications. Adam B. Vary and Dennis Hensley of The Advocate called the album "surprisingly assured" and noted similarities to George Michael's music, while Joey Guerra of the Houston Chronicle felt that the album "thrives on a glossy pop sensibility". Guerra wrote that Rollercoaster successfully blends club music with "ballads", "crunchy rock tunes" and "even a '50s-flavored doowop ditty". He and Billboard compared the album's first and second singles respectively to "I'm a Slave 4 U" by Britney Spears. Barry Walters of Out magazine praised Rollercoaster for sounding "more like a solo disc from Justin Timberlake or JC Chasez than the bland pop from most of [Verraros]' Idol cohorts". Although Walters suggested that Rollercoaster sounds "prematurely dated" due to its blend of "boy-band dance tracks, mainstream rock, and George Michael-ish balladry", he nonetheless called the album "subversive" for offering a gay perspective, highlighting the track "So Deep" for co-opting the "penetration metaphor" of songs typically performed by female artists.

"With its loud guitars and melancholic piano, "Outside" suggests Linkin Park, while its lyrics put a gay spin on that band's social outlaw theme".

— An excerpt from Out magazine's review of Rollercoaster.

Diane Anderson-Minshall of Curve magazine wrote that Rollercoaster had found a lesbian fanbase, and Ben Katner of TV Guide considered the album's lead single, "You Turn It On", to be an "infectious club hit". Katner also called the entire album "unrelentingly catchy". Sherrill Fulghum of The Empty Closet positively compared the album to other dance music, writing, "The dance beat is there, but so are other instruments carrying melodies that will entice you to listen deeper." Fulghum wrote that the album "contain[s] interesting lyrics" and also serves as a demonstration of Gabe Lopez's "musicianship".

Guerra singled out the tracks "Welcome to Hollywood" and "Outside" as highlights. He also complimented "You Turn It On" for having a "slinky Neptunes groove". Billboard commented on Rollercoaster's second single, "You're Getting Crazy (Estas Enloqueciendo)", by writing that the song "treads in similar territory [as "You Turn It On"], stirring the beats into a simmering frenzy." In 2014, Boston Spirit magazine compiled a list of eight recommended love songs "by gay artists about same-sex romance" and included "Alive" from Rollercoaster.

A less positive review of Rollercoaster came from Jonathan Takiff of the Philadelphia Daily News, who gave the album a C and called it "cheezy". AllMusic did not review the album, but gave it two-and-a-half stars out of five. Although Mark Franklin of The York Dispatch's blog Idol Chatter praised the dance tracks "Forbidden Love", "Move", and "You Turn It On", he criticized Rollercoaster's ballads and gave the album a C−.

== Track listing ==
No.	Title	Length
1.	"Move"	3:09
2.	"You Turn It On"	3:26
3.	"Hold On"	3:18
4.	"Forbidden Love"	3:37
5.	"Outside"	3:33
6.	"Welcome to Hollywood"	3:31
7.	"You're Getting Crazy (Estas Enloqueciendo)"	3:36
8.	"So Deep"	3:37
9.	"Alive"	4:57
10.	"I Want You"	3:46
11.	"One More Time"	4:03

== Personnel ==
Credits adapted from AllMusic.

- Jim Verraros – vocals

Additional vocals

- Noelle Benny – background vocals
- Gabe Lopez – background vocals
- Jerry Minnerly – background vocals
- Angela Peel – background vocals

Additional musicians

- Norm Antonini – drums
- Barnaby Hitzig – guitar
- Gabe Lopez – acoustic guitar, bass guitar, drum programming, electric guitar, harmonica, keyboards, grand piano, synthesizer bass

Technical personnel

- Mike Houge – engineering
- Gabe Lopez – Engineering, mixing, production

Miscellaneous

- Blaire Brodar – styling
- Jeff Chenault – Art direction, design
- Dan O'Leary – product management
