= Queer media and entertainment =

Queer media and entertainment may refer to:

- List of LGBT periodicals
- List of LGBT-related films
