= EGN =

EGN may refer to:

- Eagle Aviation France, a defunct French airline
- Eastrington railway station, in England
- EGN Australia, an online computer games network
- Erie Gay News, a newsletter in Erie, Pennsylvania
- European Geoparks Network
- Geneina Airport, in Sudan
- Uniform civil number, a Bulgarian administrative identification number
