= Preference (disambiguation) =

Preference is a term used in scientific literature.

Preference may also refer to:

- Preference (economics), as the term is used in economics
- Preferans, the Russian version of the card game, Préférence
- Préférence, a card game played in Austria, Hungary and the West Balkans
- Preferences mag, French gay periodical usually styled PREF mag
- Preferred stock, preference stock or preference shares, a form of corporate equity ownership
- Unfair preference, a legal term
- In computing, the computer configuration or preferences of the software
