= My Comrade =

Underground magazine in New York City

My Comrade is a queer underground magazine published and edited by Linda Simpson, a drag queen from New York City, who is often considered a historian of the drag scene. It was published between 1987 and 1994, and came back in late 2004.

== History ==
=== 1987–94 ===
In 1987, Simpson started to publish My Comrade, a magazine about New York City's gay nightlife, as editor. The original format was that of a zine: a group of black and white photocopies stapled together. Over that period, 9 issues were published, and its success allowed it to continually grow in format and content.

The publication self-proclaimed itself the "court jester of the queer press"; it opted for a camp approach to gay lifestyle, talking ironically about popular culture, and parodying other types of magazines. The publication also acted as a showcase for photographers, illustrators, and writers of the queer subculture. It was very popular among the underground queer scene of New York City, and is still considered by many a great embodiment of Manhattan Lower East Side’s and East Village’s LGBT culture of the period.

=== Since 2004 ===
After a 10-year hiatus, Simpson decided to come back with the magazine in the fall of 2004. The gay press, especially in New York City, expressed its contentment with the publication's comeback, and the new issue received excellent reviews. The second issue of the 21st century, released in spring 2006 featured the first color cover in My Comrade’s history. The magazine's format thus evolved to resemble more to other popular magazines, though its inside design kept the "zine" aesthetic of the past issues. The content also kept with the humorous tone of the previous series. It features funny stories and reportage, as well as profiles of a broad range of personalities, from local go-go dancers to widely known reality television stars like Austin Scarlett, along with drag queens, burlesque performers, and artists.

In 2022, My Comrade was the theme of a special exhibit at Howl! Happening Gallery, in Lower East Side, New York.

== See also ==
- Drag pageantry
- LGBT culture in New York City
- List of drag queens from New York City
- List of LGBT periodicals
