= Olgerta Kharitonova =

- Ольгерта Харитонова
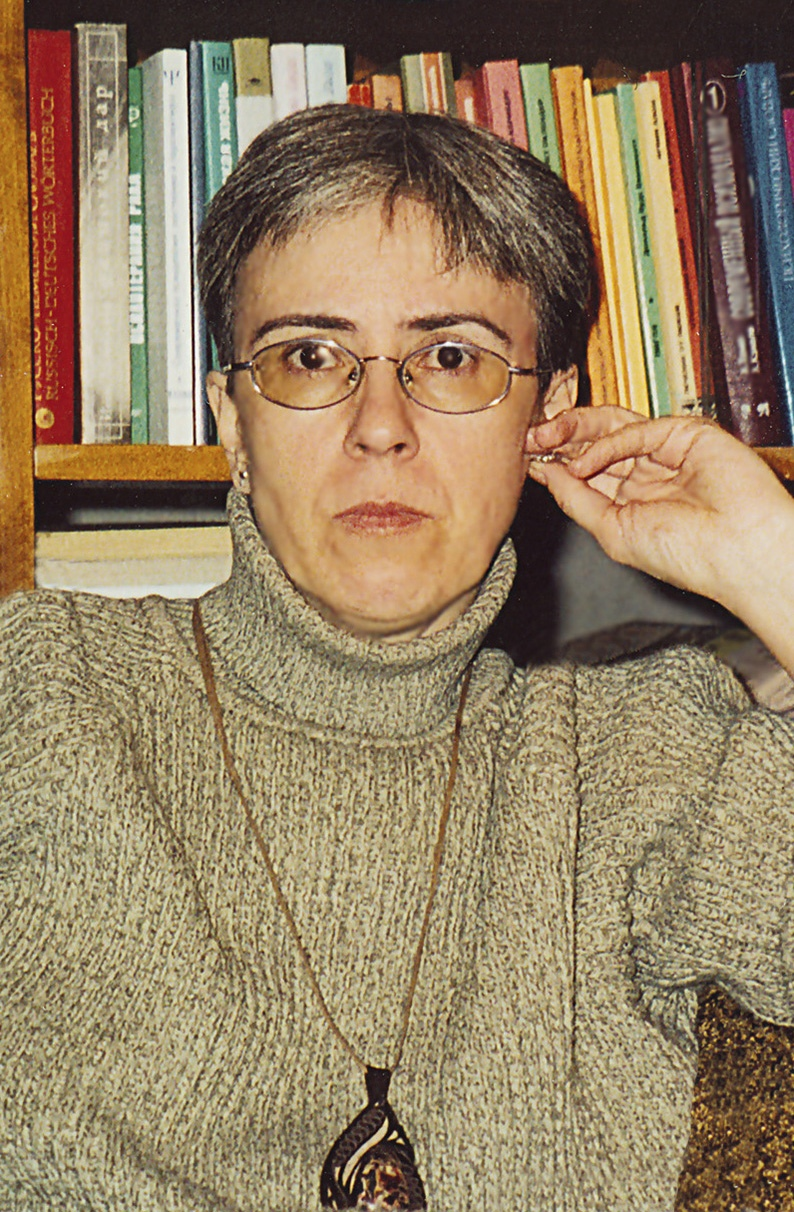
- Born: Olgerta Vladislavovna Kharitonova; March 30, 1959 (67 years); Lysva, Perm Krai, Russian SFSR, USSR
- Other name: Olga Gert
- Education: Candidate of Sciences in Philosophy
- Occupations: Feminist, LGBT activist, public figure, university lecturer, novelist, journalist
- Notable work: Magazine Ostrov
- Spouse: Zabina

Olgerta Vladislavovna Kharitonova (Note: Russian: Ольгерта Владислововна Харитонова, IPA: [ˈolgɛrtɐ ˈvlɐdɪslɐvɐvnɐ ˈxaritonovə]) (March 30, 1959, in Lysva, Perm Krai, Russian SFSR, USSR) (Note: A variety of sources say Olgerta is 'на Урале' or 'from the Urals'.) is a Russian philosopher, LGBTQ+ activist, and feminist developing the philosophical part of feminist theory and women's rights supporter. She is also a prose writer and journalist. She also is a supporter of the Ukrainian side of the Russian invasion of Ukraine.

== Magazine Ostrov ==
Kharitonova is the creator and editor of Samizdat magazine Ostrov; (lit. 'Island') beginning publishment in 1999, being self-described as "radical feminist artistic and journalistic".

The aim of the magazine was to introduce lesbian culture to Russia and increase lesbian self-esteem, along with promoting their public perception along with the ,relationship's of lesbian's relationships, and maintaining it, along with contributing to the consolidation of the LGBTQ community. and the magazine succeeded in such of that; cultivating a tolerant attitude towards lesbians. The magazine was self quoted to be, "texts written by lesbians themselves, texts for lesbians, and texts that highlight the life of the LGBT community in whole." and also focused on struggles of women themselves; feminist texts.

== Personal life ==
Kharitonova is married to a woman named Zabina (undisclosed last name) and they both reside in Chemnitz, Germany after immigrating after the annexation of Crimea by Russia. She is also reportedly an Anti-Putinist.
