= The Phoenix: Midwest Homophile Voice =

LGBT magazine

- Rising From the Fiery Hell of Social Injustice, The Wings of Freedom Will Never Be Stilled
- June 1967 cover of magazine
- Type: Magazine
- Founder: Drew Shafer
- Publisher: The Phoenix Society For Individual Freedom
- Editor-in-chief: Lance Carter
- Editor: Dean Triton
- Associate editor: Eric Damon
- Staff writers: Peter Roman; (Ad Manager)
- Current events: Estelle Graham; (Shafer's mother)
- Launched: 1966; 60 years ago
- Ceased publication: 1972; 54 years ago
- City: Kansas City, Missouri
- Country: US
- OCLC number: 15000286

The Phoenix: Midwest Homophile Voice was an American homophile magazine that ran from 1966 to 1972. It was published by The Phoenix Society for Individual Freedom, in Kansas City, Missouri, and was the first LGBT magazine in the Midwest. The magazine was founded by Drew Shafer, a gay rights activist from Kansas City (KC), who was known for bringing the homophile movement to KC. The magazine's motto was: "Rising From the Fiery Hell of Social Injustice, The Wings of Freedom Will Never Be Stilled."

== History and background ==
The first issue in 1966 was originally titled The Phoenix: Homophile Voice of Kansas City, but was changed in the next issue to Midwest Homophile Voice. They were distributed at gay and straight clubs, LGBT meetings, social gatherings, college campuses, and other businesses sympathetic to the movement. The magazine even made its way to Iowa and Nebraska.

The magazine had the typical fare for a homophile magazine: poetry, artwork, cartoons, short stories, and it also delved into serious issues like the psychological aspects of homosexuality, and gave counsel about legal rights for LGBT citizens, in case of an interaction with law enforcement, or medical professionals. The magazine was financially supported by advertising revenue from local gay establishments, mostly gay bars in the area.

Shafer's parents were very supportive of their son and his LGBT activism. Shafer's father was a commercial printer, and he was instrumental in obtaining printing equipment for the periodical, installing an old linotype machine in the basement of the Phoenix House. The magazine was created using paste-up boards, and hand drawn graphics. His mother, Phyllis Shafer, was a LGBT activist herself, and wrote under the pseudonym 'Estelle Graham' for the magazine. In the July 1966 issue, she penned an essay titled "A Mother's Viewpoint On Homosexuality".

After their successful start in publishing their own magazine, Shafer consented to be a publishing clearinghouse for the North American Conference of Homophile Organizations, in August 1966. They reprinted magazines, newsletters, and pamphlets from other homophile organizations from around the United States, including: Tangents, Vector and the Homophile Action League newsletter. They also put together North American Conference of Homophile Organization periodicals, and circulated them across the US. According to Stuart Hinds, co-founder of the Gay and Lesbian Archive of Mid-America, "Kansas City became the information distribution center for the homophile movement".

By 1972, Shafer had accumulated an enormous amount of debt ($50,000), trying to keep his publishing business going, and keeping the Phoenix House open. Advertising revenue from the magazine had dramatically dwindled as well, so the magazine ceased publication, and the house was forced to close.

== Legacy ==
In 2016, a historical marker was installed by the Gay and Lesbian Archive of Mid-America, at Barney Allis Plaza in downtown Kansas City, commemorating Shafer's magazine The Phoenix: Midwest Homophile Voice, and his work with The Phoenix Society.

In 2021, a traveling exhibit featuring some of Shafer's magazines, and his publishing network, along with his work with the Phoenix House, was on display at the Missouri State Museum inside the state capitol. It was put together by students at the University of Missouri-Kansas City, and was focused on local Kansas City LGBT history. However, after four days it was removed from the capitol building, after complaints it was "pushing the LGBT agenda" in the state capitol. The complaints reportedly came from Republican legislators and their staff. (Note: Two photographs of the display that was removed. In the photograph from the New York Times, on the left side, you can see the magazine's motto on a display; in the photograph from Washington University in St. Louis, on the right side, you can see the display about the Phoenix Society's publishing network.)

== See also ==
- List of LGBT periodicals
- List of LGBT rights activists
- Sexual minority
- Terminology of homosexuality
