= Motherland (2022 film) =

- Directed by: Vic Gerami
- Written by: Vic Gerami
- Produced by: Vic Gerami
- Starring: Vic Gerami
- Distributed by: The Blunt Post Media
- Release date: November 26, 2022
- Running time: 113 minutes
- Country: United States
- Languages: English; Armenian; Azerbaijani; Turkish

Motherland is a 2022 independent documentary film directed and written by Armenian-American journalist Vic Gerami. The film documents the buildup and aftermath of the Second Nagorno-Karabakh War, from the perspective of Armenians, especially from the Republic of Artsakh.

== Synopsis ==
Motherland is a documentary about the Second Nagorno-Karabakh War that started in September 2020. The movie attempts to document the attacks against Artsakh (Nagorno-Karabakh) Armenians by Azerbaijan during a 44-day war.

The documentary consists of interviews conducted by journalist and activist Vic Gerami in an effort to document various war crimes alleged against the state of Azerbaijan. The war crimes include violence against civilians, the use of chemical weapons, and mistreatment of POWs.

Throughout his interviews, Gerami gathers testimonies from Armenian-American and international political figures; as well as refugees and war veterans.

Additional information discussed in the movie include the Armenians of Nagorno-Karabakh, also referred to as Artsakh. It discusses the Soviet era. During this era, border lines were drawn up, causing ethnic tensions between the Armenian and Azerbaijani sides, leading up to ethnic cleansing against the local Armenian population throughout the 20th century and now the 21st century. Parallels are drawn between Azerbaijan's 2020 attack on Nagorno-Karabakh and the 1915 Armenian Genocide. The documentary criticises the actions of the Azerbaijani government in the years leading up to the 2020 war.

== Cast ==
The cast features key figures from the Armenian American political and cultural world, as well as political figures from other Armenia and Europe.

- Kristina Aznavour, CEO of the Aznavour Foundation
- Nicolas Aznavour, cofounder of the Aznavour Foundation that provides humanitarian aid to Armenians in Nagorno-Karabakh
- Caroline Cox, a baroness and member of the British House of Lords and long-term advocate of Karabakh Armenians
- Barlow Der Mugrdechian, a historian and lecturer at California State University, Fresno
- Vic Gerami, Armenian-American journalist, director, and narrator
- Irina Ghaplanyan, a political scientist and former Deputy Minister of Environment of Armenia
- Paul Koretz, a member of the Los Angeles City Council for the 5th district from 2009 to 2022
- Alexander Lapshin, an Israeli-Ukrainian-Russian travel-blogger and journalist who was arrested and extradited to Baku because he had visited Nagorno-Karabakh
- Barbara Lee, a U.S. representative for California's 13th congressional district who co-signed a letter that condemned Azerbaijan's offensive operations against Nagorno-Karabakh
- Edmon Marukyan, the ambassador-at-large of Armenia
- Bob Menendez, a senior United States senator from New Jersey and critic of U.S. military aid to Azerbaijan
- Mahammad Mirzali, an Azerbaijani video blogger and activist against the Azerbaijani government
- Khatchig Mouradian, a lecturer in Middle Eastern, South Asian, and African Studies (MESAAS) at Columbia University
- Frank Pallone, a U.S. representative for New Jersey's 6th congressional district and co-chairman of the Congressional Caucus on Armenian
- Katie Porter, a U.S. representative from California's 47th congressional district
- Adam Schiff, a U.S. representative from California and a leading voice in Armenian-American issues
- Brad Sherman, a U.S. representative for California's 32nd congressional district who had called for sanctions against Azerbaijan
- Zareh Sinanyan, High Commissioner of Diaspora Affairs of Armenia
- Jackie Speier, a U.S. representative for California's 14th congressional district and co-chair of the bipartisan Congressional Armenian Caucus

The cast also includes many veterans, civilians, and refugees from the Second Nagorno-Karabakh War.

== Reception ==
Several members of the US congress were invited to the film's screening, although it is unclear how many attended.

Panos Kotzathanasis of Asian Movie Plus described the movie as "a well-researched, well-shot and edited documentary that manages to inform its audience".

== Awards ==
- 2022 Excellence Award for Docu-drama Feature at the Documentaries Without Borders Film Festival
- 2022 Exceptional Merit for Direction at the Documentaries Without Borders Film Festival
- 2022 Best Documentary Feature at the Cannes World Film Festival
- 2022 August Award for Best Documentary at the Pure Magic International Film Festival
- 2022 September Best Indie Documentary Feature at the 8 And HalFilm Awards
- 2022 September Award for Feature Documentary at the Florence Film Awards
- 2022 October Honourable Mention at the Paris Film Awards

== See also ==
- Second Nagorno-Karabakh War
- Anti-Armenian sentiment in Azerbaijan
