= Phyllis Shafer =

American LGBTQ rights activist

- Children: Drew Shafer

Phyllis Shafer was an American LGBTQ activist. Throughout the 1960s and 1970s, she and her son, Drew Shafer, operated the Phoenix House, a safe haven for queer people in the city, and a hub of national queer activism. She wrote an advice column for The Phoenix under the pseudonym Estelle Graham.
