= G: Gaya Hidup Ceria =

Gay magazine in Indonesia (1982–1984)

- Categories: Gay magazine
- Publisher: Lambda Indonesia
- First issue: August 1982
- Final issue: November 1984
- Country: Indonesia
- Based in: Surakarta, Central Java
- Language: Indonesian
- OCLC: 952385091

G: Gaya Hidup Ceria (transl. G: Happy Lifestyle) was the first gay magazine in Indonesia. It was first published in August 1982 by Lambda Indonesia in the hopes of building a gay liberation movement in the country. During its short existence, the magazine created a semi-public space for members of the gay community to connect with each other. G: Gaya Hidup Ceria stopped publishing by the end of 1984, but it would inspire the creation of many other gay publications in the following two decades.

== History ==
Before the internet, the dominant medium of expression for gay and lesbian communities in Indonesia were small-scale, independently published magazines. They were printed in small batches—no magazine ever had a print run of over eight hundred—and distributed by hand and through mail. Never sold publicly, these magazines were usually given away for free or sold for about the same price as a regular magazine. (Note: These magazines never received mainstream recognition, apart from the occasional coverage of them by the media. One such example was when the women's magazine Sarinah ran a story on G: Gaya Hidup Ceria in 1982.)

G: Gaya Hidup Ceria was the first of these magazines, being published by Lambda Indonesia (LI) in August 1982. LI had been established in the same year as the first gay organization in Indonesia, with prominent gay activist Dede Oetomo as one of its founders. Based in the city of Surakarta, Central Java, the magazine was created in the hopes of building a gay liberation movement in the country.

G: Gaya Hidup Ceria provided a semi-public space for connection and communication among Indonesia's gay community, becoming fertile ground for discussion and debate on tensions within the Indonesian gay liberation movement. However, the magazine had stopped publishing by the end of 1984, though it would go on to inspire the creation of various other publications, most notably GAYa Nusantara. It had a total of eight editions published during its existence.

== Archives ==
All eight editions of G: Gaya Hidup Ceria have been archived by the Queer Indonesia Archive and can be accessed through their website.
