= Outlook Media =

Defunct LGBTQ magazine

- Outlook Media media kit and image used for Outlook Columbus May 2009 Urban Living Issue
- President & Publisher: Christopher L. Hayes
- Publisher and Editor-in-chief: Robert B. Vitale
- Publisher and Head of Growth: Chad P. Frye
- Categories: Newsmagazine
- Frequency: Monthly
- Circulation: 100,000 per issue
- Publisher: Chad P. Frye, Chris L. Hayes, Robert B. Vitale
- Founded: 1995
- Final issue: 2017
- Company: Outlook Media
- Country: U.S.
- Based in: Columbus, Ohio
- Language: English
- Website: outlookcolumbus.com
- ISSN: 4702-5131

Outlook Media was a Columbus, Ohio-based lesbian, gay, bisexual, transgender (LGBTQ) lifestyle and advocacy company for the Ohio queer and allied community from 1995 until late 2017. Their flagship product, Outlook Columbus was a news, politics, and lifestyle magazine. Outlook Media also published High Street Neighborhoods, managed Columbus' LGBTQ and allied business networking group, Network Columbus, and partnered with the Ohio Historical Society to form the Gay Ohio History Initiative. In 2015, Outlook Media began to publish The Love Big LGBT Wedding Expo Guide, and began holding Love Big LGBT Wedding Expos throughout Ohio.

== Publications and community initiatives ==
=== Outlook Columbus ===
Outlook Columbus was a monthly lifestyle and advocacy magazine geared toward Ohio's LGBTQ and urban progressive communities. Editorial coverage includes politics, small businesses, arts & entertainment, health & wellness, faith, fashion, sports, interviews, horoscopes, events and community news. With content that contains both locally and nationally focused features. The publication replaced Outlook Weekly as the company's primary publication. Over 25,000 print copies were distributed monthly, available to readers for free. Outlook Columbus differentiated itself from similar LGBTQ publications by its advertising; Outlook did not limit its partners to gay-owned or gay-themed advertisers, but also included gay-friendly or straight allied businesses, including local businesses as well as Bank One, Time Warner, and American Express. According to studies listed on their corporate website, Outlook Columbus was the number one media choice for the Columbus LGBTQ and allied community, the number one media choice for newcomers to Columbus who have been in the city for 5 years or less, and the number two print choice for African Americans in Columbus.

Outlookohio.com was the magazine's online counterpart. The website produces daily content, news, event photos, contests, polls, and videos.

In 2015, Outlook celebrated 20 years of publishing. In June 2017, Outlook ceased publication.

=== Love Big LGBT Wedding Expos and Guide ===
Ohio's only LGBTQ and allied wedding expo series, Love Big Expos offered a safe and welcoming place for LGBTQ couples to meet vendors who were LGBTQ-friendly. Because Ohio still did not legally recognize marriage equality, LGBTQ couples had to go out of state to get their licensing, but some chose to hold their receptions and religious ceremonies in-state, and they formed Love Big's customer base.

Ohio's first print and digital LGBTQ wedding guide & directory, Love Big Wedding Guide was a free, full color magazine featuring LGBTQ-friendly vendors servicing the Ohio market.

Outlook Media
- Editor: Chris Hayes
- Advertising director: Chad P. Frye
- Former editors: Aaron Leventhal
- Categories: Saver Magazine
- Frequency: Bi-Annual
- Circulation: 75,000 per issue
- Founded: 2000
- Company: Outlook Media
- Country: USA
- Based in: Columbus, Ohio
- Language: English
- Website: livelocalcolumbus.com

=== High Street Neighborhoods ===
High Street Neighborhoods was a free, bi-annual, community based saver-magazine serving the Columbus, Ohio metropolitan area. Each issue was divided into sections by neighborhood. It included a travel guide, service directory, and pet directory.

=== Live Local Columbus ===
Live Local Columbus Magazine was a joint venture with Columbus, Ohio's shop local program, The Small Business Beanstalk. Live Local focused on telling the stories of Columbus locals.

=== Network Columbus ===
Network Columbus was dubbed Central Ohio's 'gay chamber of commerce.' The organization, with 3000 members, provided networking events, educational programs, business advocacy, and linkages with other business and professional organizations with the purpose to lead and support economic growth within the central Ohio LGBTQ community.

=== Gay Ohio History Initiative ===
Outlook Media and The Ohio Historical Society created this initiative to include memorabilia and memories for gay people across the state. As of summer 2010, two exhibits, Remembering the Berwick Ball, and The International Drag King Community Extravaganza Exhibit, had been curated by the Gay Ohio History initiative. A traveling exhibit was in the works.

=== Radio Outlook ===
Radio Outlook was a weekly LGBTQ talk-radio show and the first of its kind in Ohio. Hosted by Chris Hayes and Chad Frye, the show had a leftward lean and targeted the LGBTQ community, but was also enjoyed by a larger progressive audience. Content covered current events, social issues, and light banter.

=== TV Outlook ===
TV Outlook was similar in format to Radio Outlook and was available on WDEM-CD.

=== Outlook ===
Outlook was the company's first publication. It was a bi-weekly newspaper and followed a newspaper approach in layout based in strong journalism and professional design, rather than serving as a promotional publication for the Greater Columbus LGBT community. Circulation was between 15,000 and 25,000 and distributed to over 200 locations.

=== Outlook Weekly ===
Outlook Weekly replaced Outlook as the companies primary publication. Published every week rather than every other week, the newspaper had similar content and format. In 2004, the publication switched content slightly, from just a news tabloid to a lifestyle tabloid as well.

== History ==
Outlook Publishing, Inc. was founded by co-owners and publishers Jeffrey D. Cox and Jim Ryan in the spring of 1995 with the primary purpose of publishing their paper titled Outlook. Ryan was editor and managed distribution while Cox managed finances, layout, and design from his home. The paper relied on volunteer initiative and freelance reporters to operate. Before Outlook's establishment, the only other LGBTQ-focused publications in Ohio were the Gay People's Chronicle, which was based out of Cleveland, and a monthly publication from Stonewall Columbus. Outlook was created to fill the void as a news voice for the Columbus community.

Under Cox, and Ryan's ownership, the newspaper quickly became respected as a professional news source. In the fall of 1998, Outlook earned five writing awards, called the Vice Versa Awards for Excellence in the Gay and Lesbian Press, from the National Gay and Lesbian Journalists Association and received third place for Best Newspaper in the weekly or bi-weekly category. These awards were given for the paper's approach to controversial topics and the effect they had on the Columbus community. For example, when Outlook published a piece about anti-gay harassment by members of the Ohio State University (OSU) wrestling team, the OSU Athletic Department created mandatory sexual orientation cultural competence training for all its employees.

In early 1999, Outlook Publishing, Inc. was sold to Lynn Greer, Jose Rodriguez, and Malcolm Riggle operating from Riggle's offices in Worthington, Ohio. Within the year Rodriguez sold his share of the company to Greer and Riggle.

In the fall of 2003, Malcom Riggle assumed sole-ownership of company operations. Under his leadership, Outlook Weekly became a lifestyle tabloid. That November, Outlook Publishing, Inc. changed names to Outlook Media, Inc. Two years later, in the fall of 2005, Outlook teamed with the Ohio Historical Society to form the Gay Ohio History Initiative. Also within the year, the magazine saw controversy in a surrounding Columbus, Ohio suburb; some members of the Upper Arlington community tried to ban the newspaper from its libraries, but after library board discussions it was decided that the paper was would remain available to patrons.

In 2006, Outlook Media changed ownership after seven years under Malcom Riggle. Chris Hayes and Michael Daniels bought the company and moved Outlook's offices to The Short North. Under their leadership, Outlook Weekly's audience expanded to the Columbus progressive community while still maintaining its readership base in the LGBTQ community. In the summer of 2008, Outlook Media started its radio program, Radio Outlook, which lasted one year.

Outlook Weekly changed format to a monthly magazine in 2009, changing names to Outlook Columbus. The final issue of Outlook Weekly was released on March 25, 2009. The monthly format changed the look of the publication by upgrading to paper stock and including more in-depth features while still remaining free to the public.

In July 2010 Chad Frye, a consultant and business executive, and Bob Vitale of the Columbus Dispatch, joined Christopher Hayes as co-owners and co-publishers. The additional partners created the capacity to re-launch the publication across the entire state of Ohio, with major distribution hubs in Cincinnati, Cleveland, Columbus, Toledo, Dayton, Youngstown, Canton, and Akron.

In June 2016, co-publishers Chad Frye and Robert Vitale exited the company, leaving Christopher Hayes as sole owner and publisher. In July 2017, Outlook ceased publication, and the assets of the company were liquidated.
