= Linda Simpson =

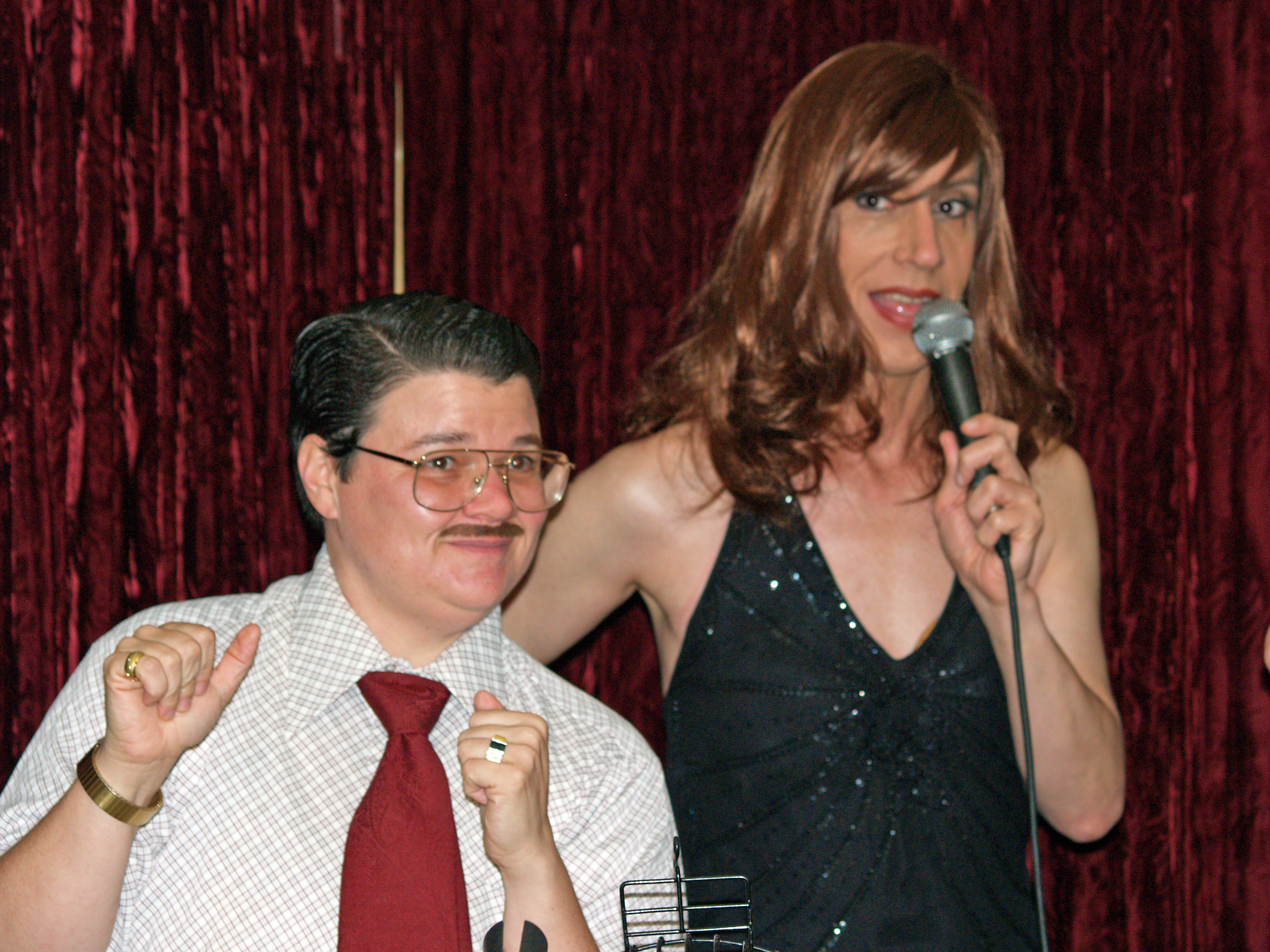
- Linda Simpson in 2007, on the right.
- Born: Leslie Simpson; Gaylord, Michigan
- Occupations: Drag personality, performer, photographer, writer, TV host
- Website: https://lindasimpson.org/ https://www.thedragexplosion.com/ http://www.lindalovesbingo.com/

Linda Simpson is a New York City based drag queen, nightlife promoter and host, photographer and writer who spearheaded and documented the iconic East Village drag scene primarily between the 1980's-1990s.

Simpson's archive consists of over 5,000 photographs, many of which were taken during her time hosting at the Pyramid Club, which is known as "ground zero for the exploding New York drag scene". Simpson's photographs feature early careers of some other notable drag stars such as RuPaul and Tabboo!. Around the 2010s, Simpson began showing a collection of these photographs and later published a book, both titled THE DRAG EXPLOSION. Prior to this seminal project, she created the underground queer magazine My Comrade/Sister! in 1987, utilizing satire, campy humor to highlight the joy and chaos of the NYC queer community flourishing despite tremendous loss of the HIV/AIDS epidemic.

Linda Simpson also co-hosted the Manhattan Public Access TV show Party Talk, Out magazine applauded Party Talk for being one of few shows where Drag Queens were taken seriously. She was "not there for you to laugh at, she's there for you to laugh with".

== Biography ==
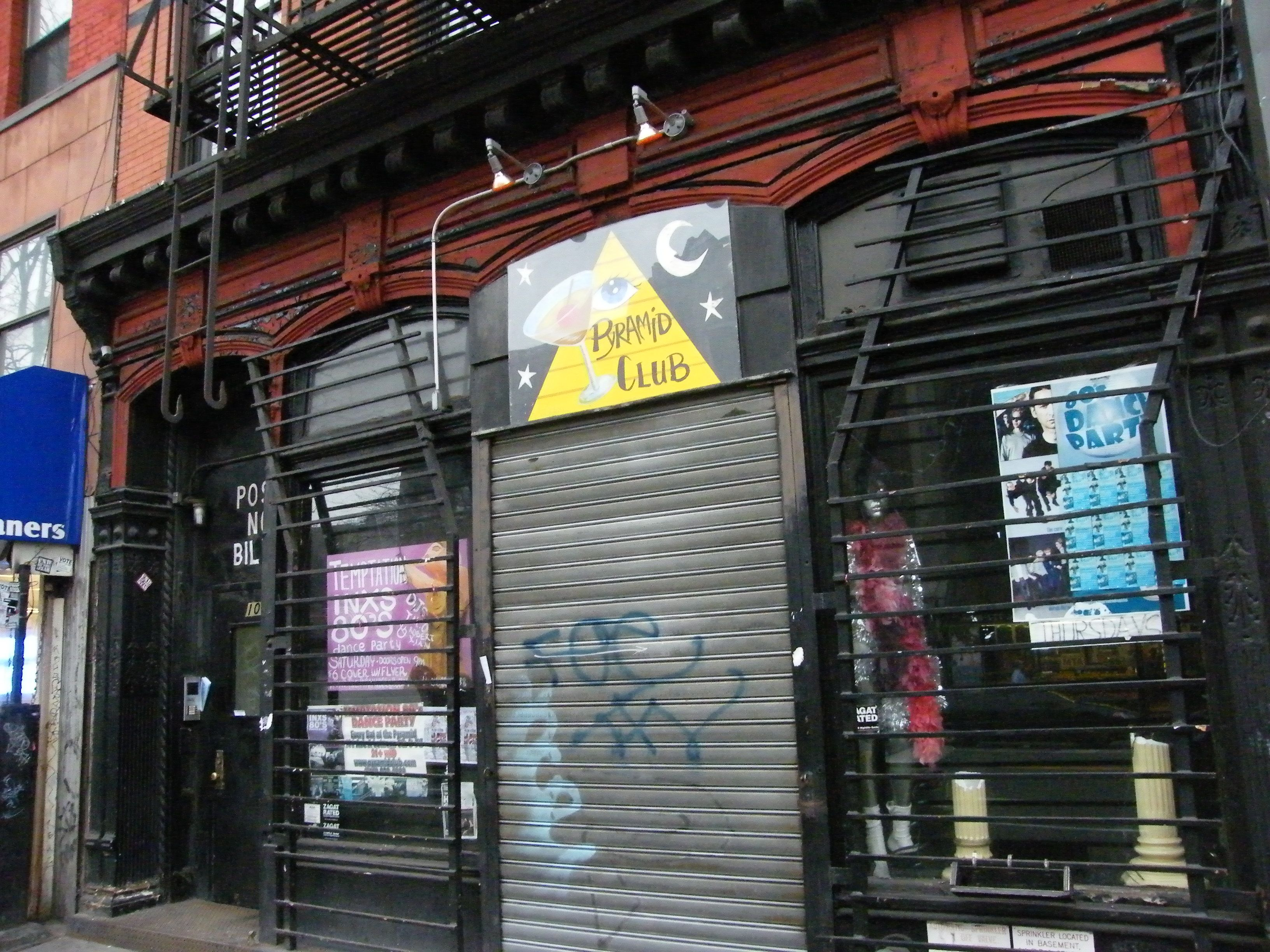
Outside of Pyramid Club, 2009

Leslie Simpson was born in Gaylord, Minnesota to a minister father and a stay-at home mother. Prior to the creation of his drag persona, Simpson attended school in New York to study advertising and communications. He found himself immersed within the East Village drag scene, inspiring him to begin working on My Comrade which became a joyous reflection of this community. It was at My Comrade zine release parties where Simpson began experimenting with drag himself. Linda Simpson (who prefers she/her pronouns when referring to her drag persona) born out of thrifted clothing and discount wigs, aimed to echo the image of strong women, in particular journalists such as Barbra Walters and Gloria Steinem.

After frequenting the Pyramid Club during a time when it's popularity was dying down, Simpson began hosting her own parties in 1990, giving the club new life. She also photographed and performed at iconic annual drag festival Wigstock, which began spontaneously at Tompkins Square Park in 1984. An important piece of New York City drag history, Wigstock was the focus of 2019 critically acclaimed documentary Wig.

== Solo exhibitions ==
- 2022 : The Drag Explosion at the Art Gallery of Regina (Saskatchewan, Canada)
- 2022 : My Comrade Magazine: Happy 35th Gay Anniversary at Howl! Happening (New York, NY)
- 2020 : Linda Simpson: Where Love Lies at Tiger Strikes Asteroid (Brooklyn, NY)
- 2014 : PAGES at ClampArt Gallery (New York, NY)

== Group exhibitions ==
- 2026 : Video Killed the Radio Star at Mudam Museum of Art (Luxembourg City, Luxembourg)
- 2024 : Gorgeousness at Benrubi Gallery (New York, NY)
- 2024 : Mighty Real/Queer Detroit festival at Anton Art Center;Carr Center (Detroit, MI)
- 2023 - 2024 : Copy Machine Manifestos: Artists Who Make Zines at the Brooklyn Museum (Brooklyn, NY)
- 2023 : Drag Show at the Carolyn Campagna Kleefeld Contemporary Art Museum (Long Beach, CA)
- 2023 : Over the Rainbow at the Centre Pompidou (Paris, France)
- 2023 : Do It Yourself! Self-Publishing from Letterpress to LaserJet at Harvard University Houghton Library (Cambridge, MA)
- 2022 - 2023 : American Drag at Harvard University Houghton Library (Cambridge, MA)
- 2022 : The Formless Body at Olga Korper Gallery (Toronto, Ontario)
- 2021 : It’s Much Louder Than Before at Anat Egbi Gallery (Los Angeles, CA)
- 2016 - 2017 : Gay Gotham at the Museum of the City of New York (New York, NY)
- 2017 : Perpetual Revolution: The Image and Social Change at the International Center of Photography (New York, NY)

== Slideshow Presentations ==
- 2026 : International Center of Photography (New York, NY)
- 2025 : Lincoln Center's David Rubenstein Atrium, (New York, NY)
- 2025 : National Arts Club (New York, NY)
- 2024 : Tom of Finland Art & Culture Festival (Los Angeles, CA)
- 2024 : Walker Museum (Minneapolis, MN)
- 2024 : C'mon Everybody (Brooklyn, NY)
- 2023 : South Street Seaport Museum (New York, NY)
- 2022 : Harvard University's Houghton Library (Cambridge, MA)
- 2022 : Mackenzie Art Gallery (Regina, Canada)
- 2022 : Mighty Real/Queer Detroit Festival (Detriot, MI)
- 2021 : Fotografiska (New York, NY)
- 2019 : The Wild Project (New York, NY)
- 2016 : New Museum (New York, NY)
- 2016 : Drag Con (Los Angeles, CA)
- 2015 : Howl Gallery (New York, NY)
- 2015 : La MaMa Gallery (New York, NY)
- 2015 : K Gallery (New York, NY)
- 2015 : West Hollywood Council Chambers (West Hollywood, CA)
- 2014 : Dixon Place (New York NY)
- 2014 : The New School (New York, NY)
- 2013 : MoMA PS 1 (Queens, NY)

== Publications ==
=== My Comrade ===
- 1987-1994 : 11 issues
- 2004 : 2 issues
- 2022 : 1 issue published along with My Comrade 35th anniversary exhibit at Howl! Happening

=== Photo Books ===
- THE DRAG EXPLOSION : GREATEST HITS, 2024 - Self-published
- MIGHTY WARRIORS, 2024 - Self-published
- THE DRAG EXPLOSION, 2020 - Domain Books
- PAGES, 2013 - Peradam
