= Pride Life =

British LGBT lifestyle magazine and website

- Editor: Nigel Robinson
- Categories: LGBTQ+, lesbian, gay, bisexual, transgender, genderqueer, intersex, and asexuality
- Frequency: Quarterly
- Founded: 2008
- Company: Pride Life Ltd
- Country: United Kingdom
- Language: English
- Website: pridelife.com

Pride Life is a British lifestyle magazine, for at the LGBTQ+ community. Initially targeted towards gay men when launched in 2008, Pride Life is now oriented for the LGBTQ+ community.

Pride Life is the largest LGBTQ+ magazine and website in the UK. The magazine bills itself as a "lifestyle resource for LGBTQ+ people." It provides regularly updated LGBTQ+ news stories and features on all aspects of LGBTQ+ life including LGBTQ+ travel, careers and diversity issues, and legal and financial advice.

Pride Life has supported global Pride events, including Pride in London, Prague Pride, Jasper Pride (Canada),

== See also ==
- List of LGBT periodicals
- List of LGBT events
