= Drew Shafer =

American gay activist (1936–1989)

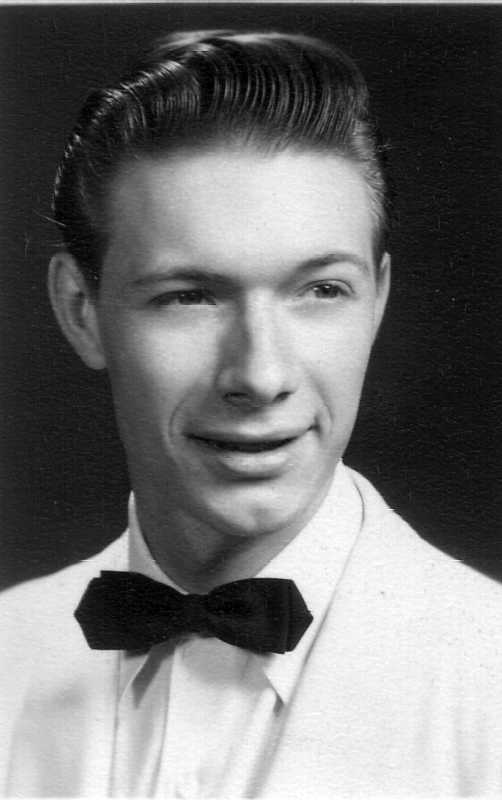
- Shafer in 1955.
- Born: April 9, 1936; Kansas City, Missouri
- Died: September 30, 1989 (aged 53); Kansas City, Missouri
- Resting place: Loose Park
- Known for: LGBT activism
- Partner: Michael Pfleger "Mickey Ray" (1968–2024)

Drew Shafer (April 9, 1936 – September 30, 1989) was an American gay activist from Kansas City, Missouri, known for his LGBTQ activism.

== Early life ==
Shafer was an only child who had "a happy upbringing" in a middle-class home, with supportive parents Phyllis and Robert Shafer. He realized he was gay in his early teens.

== Activism ==
Shafer was vocal about being gay, which was unusual for the time and place. In the mid-1960s he gave speeches about gay rights at college campuses. He also organized a local chapter of ONE, Inc.

In February 1966, Shafer attended the National Planning Conference of Homophile Organizations in downtown Kansas City at the State Hotel. He gave a speech there on the importance of communication and unity. He also spoke about the conference on a local radio show, which nearly lost him his clerical job at a Caterpillar Tractor Company plant. Fortunately, the United Auto Workers Union prevented his manager from firing him, as they pointed out Shafer could not be fired for what he did outside of business hours.

Soon afterward, in March 1966, Shafer dissolved his chapter of ONE, Inc. and founded the Phoenix Society for Individual Freedom with about 20 founding members. He served as the organization's president until 1968. Alongside this, in 1966 he started The Phoenix: Midwest Homophile Voice, the first LGBTQ magazine in the Midwest. The magazine's circulation slowly spread outside of the state, to places like Iowa and Nebraska.

In August 1966, Shafer also began printing for another organization: the North American Conference of Homophile Organizations (NACHO). He and his friends "were now responsible for printing and mailing everyone’s magazines, newsletters and pamphlets – all from a basement in Shafer’s house". In practice, this also allowed more far-flung organizations to connect with each other through Shafer.

In the 1960s Shafer also served on NACHO's Credentials Committee.

In 1968, Shafer and the Phoenix Society purchased a three-story house for their use. Dubbed the "Phoenix House", the building operated as an organizational headquarters, a community center, and a halfway house for community members in need. It also boasted a library of gay and lesbian literature. Shafer covered the organization's rent and utility bills, getting himself into about $50,000 of debt.

In 1969, the vocal nature of the Phoenix Society caused some businesses to pull their advertisements from The Phoenix; this only worsened after the Stonewall riots and the rise of the more "confrontational" gay liberation movement. After a few years, the Phoenix Society closed in 1972 due to financial troubles.

Although the Phoenix Society had closed, Shafer continued his activism. He met with student groups. In 1976, he protested the Republican National Convention held at Kemper Arena. The following year, he joined protests against Anita Bryant in Columbus and Kansas City.

In 1986, Shafer volunteered to work at an AIDS hospice center in Kansas City. He tested positive for HIV during the required blood test.

== Personal life and family ==
Unlike most other gay men at the time, Shafer was fully supported by his parents, who also joined in his activism. His mother, Phyllis Shafer, ran a boarding house for some of Shafer's gay friends in the 1950s. She had also accompanied Shafer when he initially attended the February 1966 conference, and later became secretary of the Phoenix Society. She wrote an advice column for The Phoenix under the pseudonym Estelle Graham. She would later join PFLAG. His father, Robert Shafer, was a printer, and he allowed his son to use his printing press for The Phoenix and other publications, before eventually giving the Society a printing press for their own use.

Shafer's longterm partner was Michael Pfleger, also known as Mickey Ray. The two met in September 1968, and they lived in Kansas City together until Shafer's death in 1989. They lived on the top floor of the Phoenix House until its closure, when they then moved in with Robert and Phyllis Shafer. In 1984 Shafer and Pfleger moved into a place of their own.

== Later life and death ==
Shafer initially did not have any symptoms from his HIV. However, by 1987 he began to have skin troubles. Although he was able to take AZT, the drug did not help him and actually seemed to accelerate his decline. Unable to continue working, he officially retired from his job at Caterpillar.

On September 29, 1989, Shafer collapsed and lost consciousness. His partner, Michael Pfleger, called an ambulance, but the ambulance drivers refused to touch Shafer. Pfleger physically moved Shafer to the back of the ambulance himself. At the hospital, Shafer received a blood transfusion and regained consciousness by the morning of September 30. However, his condition worsened that afternoon, and he died that evening with Pfleger at his side.

Shafer was cremated, and his ashes were spread in the Rose Garden at Loose Park by his partner, parents, and several dozen friends and former members of the Phoenix Society.
