= FENUXE =

American gay magazine

- FENUXE Magazine #1, April 22, 2010
- Editor in Chief: Mikkel Hildebrandt
- Categories: LGBT-related magazine
- Frequency: Biweekly
- Publisher: TW Media Group
- Founded: 2010
- Country: USA (Atlanta, Georgia)
- Language: English
- Website: www.Fenuxe.com
- ISSN: 2157-006X
- OCLC: 657320828

FENUXE is an Atlanta-based bi-weekly magazine written for the gay community that is published by TW Media Group. The magazine updates online daily and produces a print edition every other Thursday.

FENUXE is an acronym and stands for Fashion, Events, Nightlife, Urban Culture, X-Plore (Gay Travel), and Eats (Dining).

== History and profile ==
The magazine debuted on April 22, 2010 and serves as a gay culture, entertainment, and lifestyle magazine for the Southeastern United States.

The magazine is a result of the financial collapse of Window Media in November 2009 and was thus named after the mythological Phoenix bird which is found on crest of the city of Atlanta that symbolizes rebirth, immortality, and renewal.
