= Gay Star and Upstart =

Gay magazines in Northern Ireland

Gay Star and upstart were influential gay magazines published in Northern Ireland between the period 1969 and 2001.

== Earlier publications: Gay Forum and Northern Gay ==
The first gay publication was Burnt Offering, also published as Gay Forum, both in 1974, more of a manifesto-cum-pamphlet than a journal. Brian Gilmore produced a GLS Information Sheet on a weekly (term-time) basis for years. A formal ‘official’ publication was felt necessary, and Brian Gilmore became editor of NIGRA News, and then a member of the Collective that produced Northern Gay. Others in the Collective were: Jeff Dudgeon, a regular contributor to all of Northern Ireland's gay magazines, John Lyttle, Stella Mahon of Sappho a short story writer, and employee of the Open University, Richard Kennedy then-President of NIGRA, and Michael Workman, who became a BBC journalist.

These two journals were information sheets, but also carried in-depth articles, Northern Gay tended to have thematic editions on, for example, ‘coming out’, the law, and women's issues. Due to out-migration, a factor in gay and general Ulster life for decades, the Collective dissolved.

== Gay Star ==
Gay Star succeeded Northern Gay, and the first four editions were edited by Peter Brooke, then by Seán McGouran and Terry McFarlane. Gay Star was a magazine for a new period, after the extension of the relevant sections "insulting and discriminatory", as NIGRA called it, Sexual Offences Act 1967 (as the Homosexual Offences Order in Council 1982. It was the first time the word "homosexual" appeared in the laws of the United Kingdom, which has three independent legal systems: English and Welsh law, Scots law and Northern Ireland law)

Gay Star became less news-oriented (it was essentially a quarterly), and carried articles, verse, graphics and other art-work by a large number of, mostly local, people. It was an attempt to produce a journal at a very high level to let those who lived outside of a deeply troubled area learn that our community had a great deal to offer our own, Ireland and Great Britain's, and even the world's gay community.

There were articles by Anthony Weir, Jeff Dudgeon, John Donaghy, Bob St Cyr (New York City), Jay Jones (Milwaukee). There were also (comparatively) learned articles by Douglas Sobey, Robert Walsh of the University of Ulster, Graham Walker, Vincent Geoghegan, Norman Stevenson, and John W. Cairns, QUB. Other major contributors were Tim Clarke, Stephen Birkett and Gabriel Burns.

Verse was published on a regular basis, by Kate O’Donnell, Sylvia Sands, Anthony Weir, Peter Brooke, Kenneth Pobo, George Gott, Ivor C Treby, and others. There were also stories by John Gallas, Rod Dungate, and Ralph Berlin.

Graphics and art work, including front covers of Gay Star were contributed by Rose Ann McGreevy, Malcolm Ryan, Damian McCourt, Paul Diver, Kevin Maxwell, and others. Articles on different aspects of music, (modern ‘classical’ by way of Diamanda Galás, to disco) by Martin Hewson, Alistair Kerr and Richard Lyttle were published). There were regular reviews of books, (including agitational pamphlets, novels, and factual material), theatre and cinema, by the editors, persons with particular expertise, as well as Jo-Dan, Verrucht, and Aelfric. Gay Star was sold, in independent bookshops all over and Ireland and Great Britain, and had subscribers in mainland Europe, America and Australia.

== upstart ==
upstart grew out of the news sheet Update, started in 1985, the latter produced because of police harassment, the fact that the management of the Europa hotel were purging its gay clientele, (but refused to own up to it), and most seriously the realisation that Northern Ireland was not immune to HIV. Gay Star was ‘privatised’ in 1989, and lasted until 1991, being replaced by an enlarged version of upstart. The union Unison printed it for most of the 1990s, but this situation came to an end, and the publication – which in most ways took up where Gay Star had left off – was last produced in 2001.

upstart was resurrected as a e-mag in 2007.
