= OMG! Magazine =

American lifestyle magazine

- Categories: Gay lifestyle and news periodical (Online)
- Frequency: Monthly (biweekly until Dec. 2010)
- First issue: June 2009
- Final issue: November 2011 (Print)
- Company: OMG Multimedia Companies, LLC
- Country: United States
- Language: English
- Website: omgmag.com/

OMG! Magazine was a lifestyle and news publication which targeted the gay & lesbian community. The magazine published articles on current affairs, travel, news and politics.

The first issue was published in June 2009 as a small biweekly, until December 2010, when it began publishing in "standard magazine size" in conjunction with a new interactive website. The magazine was published from Florida by OMG Multimedia Companies, LLC which owned the registered trade mark OMG! Magazine. The new magazine was Florida centric but has national presence, including Atlanta, New York & Las Vegas. In 2010 an interactive website was created which included online dating and social networking, as well as a travel booking engine and a music player. The magazine's popularity benefited in May 2010, when it landed the cover story for its special collector's edition featuring the 1950s and 1960s iconic singing legend, Connie Francis.

In December 2010, the magazine partnered with the gay travel company, ALandCHUCK.travel, to supply the website engine for OMG! Magazine's online travel booking feature. ALandCHUCK.travel garnered an 'F' rating with the BBB and is now defunct.
