= Out & About (newsletter) =

- A scanned image of the premier issue of Out & About in September 1992.
- Type: Print, Online
- Format: Newsletter
- Owner: Here Media Inc.
- Founder(s): David Alport, Billy Kolber
- Editor: Ed Salvato
- Founded: 1992
- Ceased publication: 2004 (as Out & About); 2008 (after Out Traveler ceased publication)
- Language: English
- Headquarters: New York City, New York, United States
- Website: www.outandabout.com

Out & About, was a travel newsletter tailored for gay and lesbian travelers. It was founded in 1992. Until the publishing ceased in 2004, the newsletter was putting out a publication rich in detail and tinged with LGBT advocacy.

== History ==
Out & About was founded by David Alport and Billy Kolber in 1992. The newsletter was specially tailored for gay and lesbian travelers. The newsletter began publication in September 1992 as a 16-page journal issued ten times yearly.

In 1993, the newsletter launched the Out & About Editors Choice Awards. The awards acknowledged places and destinations that were the best in gay travel. Out & About was the first gay travel publication to provide comparative ratings of gay-friendliness of national airlines and hotel chains. In the gay-friendliness index, companies were judged according to equal-employment benefits for members of the LGBT community, transferability of awards between gay partners or family members, gay-specific marketing and sensitivity training on gay and other issues. In 1997, the Hyperion division of Disney published two Out & About guidebooks, one focused on US resorts and warm weather vacations and the other on North American cities.

In 1998, the newsletter called for a travel boycott to the Cayman Islands until the island's government can assure the safety of its gay tourists. The boycott was raised after an incident that denied boarding rights at Grand Cayman island to the Norwegian Cruise Line's Leeward, which was carrying some chartered 900 gay passengers.

In 1999, as the newsletter was involved with evaluating treatments of gays from airlines and from the whole travel industry, the editor of Out & About, Billy Kolber, commented with a disappointment for the United Airlines on its anti-gay policies.

In 2000, Out & About was acquired by PlanetOut Inc.'s PlanetOut.com, a web portal for gays and lesbians. After being sold to PlanetOut Inc., the newsletter continued publication until 2004, when it was folded into Out Traveler magazine, which promoted friendly ski resorts in North America and in the world, and made a list of gay friendly cities and tourist destinations. It also continued the annual Editors Choice Awards, citing best and worst destinations for gay travel.

When the Supreme Court of California halted same-sex marriages in 2004 in California, Ed Salvato, the Editor of Out & About, wrote in the editors note of the newsletter that marriages will still continue to happen, raising his hopes for equality of marriage, specially with the members of the LGBT community. Out & About was a strong supporter of same-sex marriages.

In 2008, PlanetOut Inc., Here Networks, and Regent Entertainment Media agreed on a merger and to create Here Media Inc. After the merger, Here Media Inc. ceased publication of Out Traveler, and re-directed the Out & About website to their consolidated Out Traveler website.

== See also ==
- LGBT tourism
- LGBT marketing
