= Illico =

French LGBT magazine (1988 - 2007)

Illico was a free bimonthly French LGBT magazine, founded in March 1988 and ceased publication in 2007.

== Overview ==
It had a circulation of around 40,000 and was composed primarily of articles and opinion polls about current events, as well as information relating to gay culture, activism, and local Parisian issues.

== Controversy ==
On 20 April 2007, the magazine's editors received a letter from the Minister of the Interior threatening to ban the magazine, on the pretext that its content could agitate the youth. The editors had made no attempt to hide their opposition to the government's candidate, Nicolas Sarkozy, in the presidential elections that year. However, three weeks later, the government said there would be no such ban.

== See also ==
- Têtu
- PREF mag
