= Hinnerk (magazine) =

German LGBT magazine

- Cover of the January 2012 edition
- Chief editor: Stefan Mielchen
- Frequency: Monthly
- Circulation: 25,000 (2010)
- First issue: 1993
- Country: Germany
- Based in: Hamburg
- Language: German
- Website: http://hinnerk.de/

Hinnerk is a German magazine for the LGBT community in Hamburg, Bremen and the northern part of Germany. Hinnerk is a free magazine and distributes around 25,000 copies monthly.

== History ==
The magazine was founded in November 1993. Founder of Hinnerk were Werner Hinzpeter and Burkhard Knopke. CEO is Peter Goebel. Chief editor is today Stefan Mielchen. The head office of the magazine is in Hamburg.

Hinnerk works together with LGBT magazines EXIT (Ruhr and Münster), gab (Frankfurt, Mannheim, Heidelberg), Leo (Munich), rik (Cologne), and Siegessäule (Berlin).
