= Gay Vegas =

American LGBTQ magazine

- Cover of the July 2017 issue, featuring Nico Tortorella
- Frequency: Monthly
- Publisher: Bundle Media Group
- Founded: 1997
- Country: United States
- Based in: Las Vegas
- Website: gayvegas.com

Gay Vegas is an American LGBT interest magazine, printed monthly and available for free. The Gay Vegas brand also includes GayVegas.com, the website. Both magazine and website have an editorial focus on Las Vegas news, politics, opinion, and arts and entertainment of interest to lesbians, gay men, bisexuals, transgender, queer, intersex, asexual and plus (LGBT) people.
