= LGBTQ San Diego County News =

LGBT newspaper covering San Diego, California

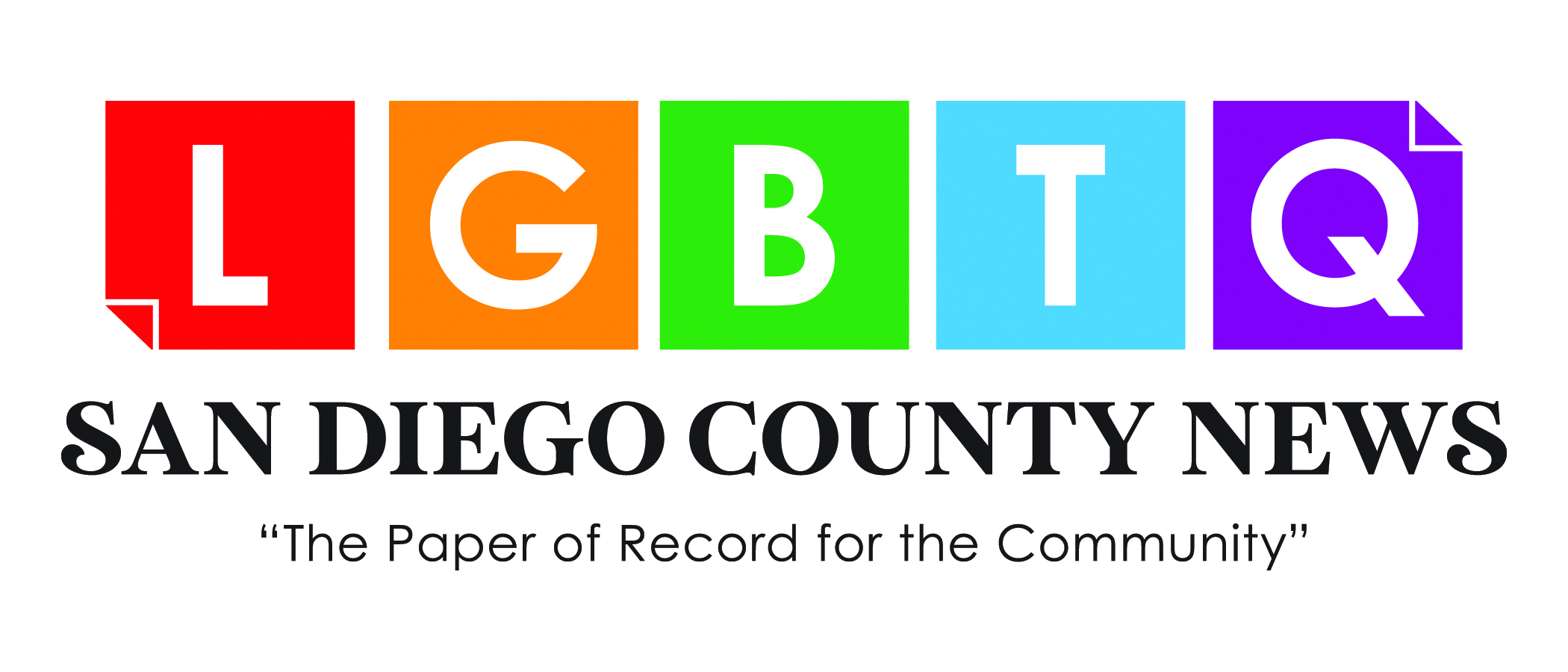
- LGBTQ San Diego County News logo
- Type: LGBT monthly print and online news source
- Format: Broadsheet
- Owner(s): MGW Media, LLC
- Founder(s): Terry Sidie, Eddie Reynoso
- Publisher: Eddie Reynoso
- President: Eddie Reynoso
- Editor-in-chief: Morgan Hurley
- Community Editor: Benny Cartwright
- Founded: 2009
- Language: English
- Headquarters: San Diego, California
- Circulation: 5,000 per month (as of First Friday of the month)
- Readership: 11,200/issue
- Website: www.lgbtqsd.news

LGBTQ San Diego County News (LGBTQSD News) is a print and online LGBT newspaper for San Diego, California.

== Ownership and circulation ==
LGBTQSD News is owned by MGW Media, LLC., and is published by San Diego LGBTQ activist and businessman, Eddie Reynoso.

LGBTQSD News is printed once a month, distributing 5,000 copies to over 140 locations In San Diego County. Its website features news and public commentary online with a wrap-up of stories delivered to e-mail subscribers every month. LGBTQSD News partners with other media outlets who contribute content.

== History ==
It was founded in 2010 as Gay San Diego, by San Diego publisher, David Manis. It sold in 2019 to Sacramento-based MGW Media, LLC., owned by Sacramento businessman, Terry Sidie. He is also the owner of Faces Nightclub, and the former publisher of Mom, Guess What?, a LGBTQ tabloid styled news publication that shut down in 2009.

The paper rebranded as LGBTQ San Diego County News following the announcement of the sale. Terry served as president of the company and as publisher of the paper, along with Nicole Murray-Ramirez, who served as Associate Publisher.

On April 16, 2023, Sidie announced his retirement from the publishing business and the transfer of 100% of his shares and assets in MGW Media, LLC, which includes LGBTQ San Diego County News to Eddie Reynoso, citing his role as executive director for the Equality Business Alliance- San Diego's LGBTQ Chamber of Commerce, as the main reason for giving away equity in his business.
