= Die Insel (magazine, 1950s) =

Die Insel (The Island) was a German homophile magazine published in the 1950s. Its title was a reference to the earlier Die Insel published by Friedrich Radszuweit during the Weimar Republic.
