= Outback (lesbian newsletter) =

Cornish lesbian newsletter published from 1997 to 2008

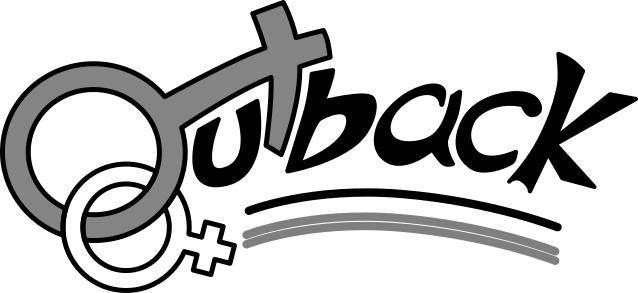
- Categories: Lesbian culture, activism
- Frequency: Monthly
- First issue: 1996; 30 years ago
- Final issue Number: 2008; 18 years ago Issue 150
- Country: United Kingdom
- Based in: Penzance, Cornwall, UK
- Language: English

Outback was a lesbian newsletter, self-published in Cornwall from 1996 to 2008. Archives of the newsletter are stored in Kresen Kernow.
