= District 202 =

LGBTQ community center in Minnesota

Final District 202 logo

District 202 began as a non-profit lesbian and gay youth coffee house in 1992 supported by a start-up grant from the Minneapolis Community Foundation. Over the years it evolved into a thriving LGBTQ | Queer youth community center. District 202's first hire was Michael Kaplan in 1992, who served as the center's first executive director until June 1998.

District 202's first home was located at 2524 Nicollet Ave in Minneapolis and included a library, coffee house, art space, and dance space. The drop-in center was open Monday and Wednesdays 3pm to 11pm, Thursdays and Fridays 3pm to 1am and Saturday 12pm to 1am.

In 1997, District 202 moved from its original space to a newly renovated 7,000 square foot warehouse space at 1601 Nicollet Ave. S in Minneapolis. The space included DJ booth, dance floor, espresso bar, and organizing space. In 1997, District 202 received 12,000 visits by 2,000 kids.

In July 2009 District 202 closed the drop-in center and is now focusing on providing programming at places like churches, community centers, and online. The organization became a part of The Family Partnership's GLBT-Kids: Abuse Intervention Program on March 20, 2012.
