= Jeanne Magazine =

French magazine

- Editor: Stephanie Delon
- Categories: Lesbianism
- Frequency: Monthly
- Founded: 2013
- First issue: January 2014
- Country: France
- Language: French

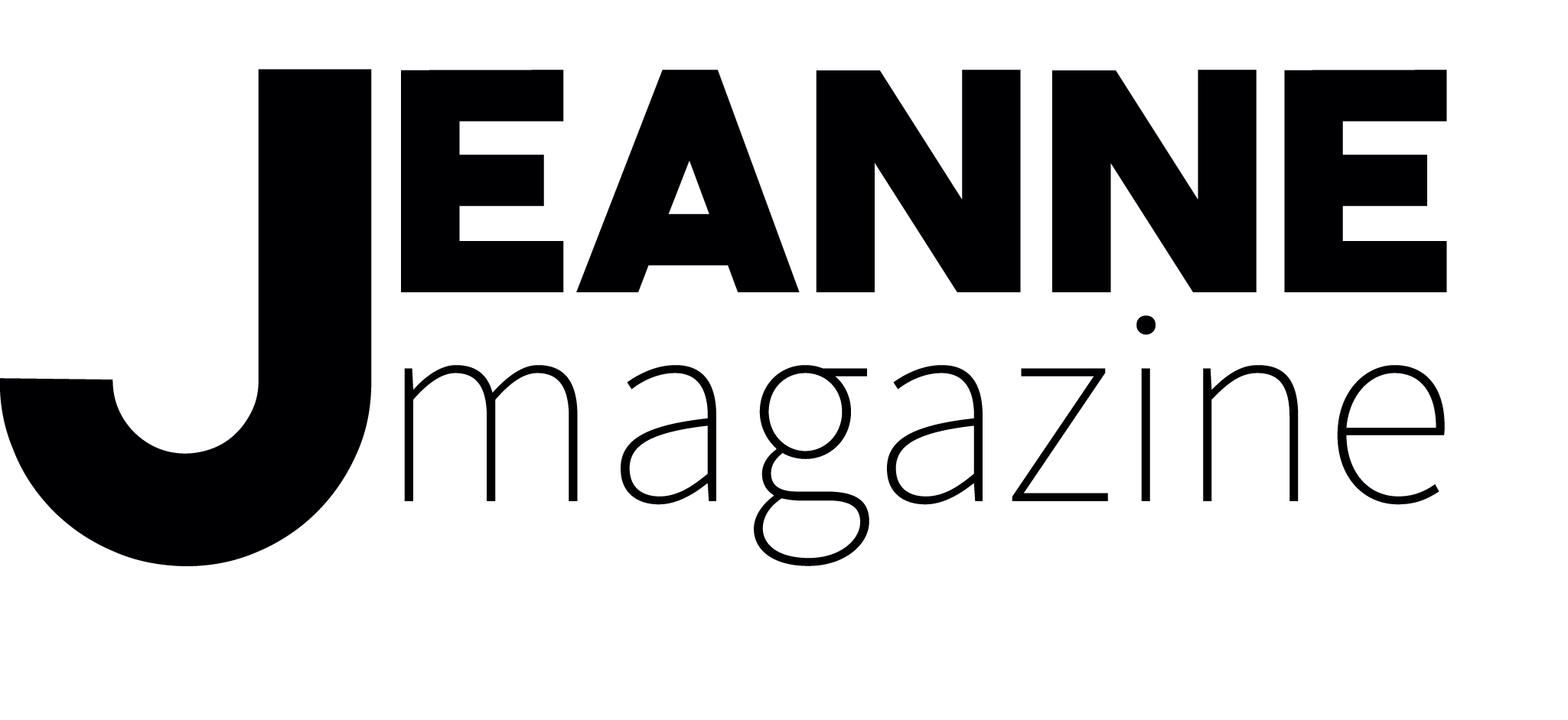
Logo of Jeanne Magazine

Jeanne Magazine is a monthly French digital magazine, created in 2014, dedicated to lesbian news and culture.

== History ==
In July 2013, the former lesbian paper magazine La Dixième Muse, briefly become Muse & Out, was placed in liquidation. At the end of 2013, the magazine's former editor-in-chief, Stephanie Delon, decided to launch a new lesbian magazine, this time in digital form, which was Jeanne Magazine. She partnered with Alice Derock, founder of the sex toy company Wet For Her. They recruited a dozen people, including professional journalists, some of whom were former columnists of La Dixième Muse. A fundraising campaign was launched on the Kiss Kiss Bank Bank website, raising 500 euros more than the target of 4000 euros.

Jeanne Magazine takes the form of a website of news and lesbian culture, regularly updated with articles, and which publishes monthly a digital magazine of about sixty pages. The magazine is readable on a computer, smartphone or digital tablet and includes multimedia-enriched content (sounds, videos) in addition to the articles themselves. Its launch price was 2.69 euros. In January 2017, the magazine published in its issues 36 and 37 a large survey of Lesbian Beings in 2017 conducted among its readers, on topics such as their way of living their sexuality and their love life, coming out and homosexuality.

== Content ==
The magazine covers current affairs, fashion, lifestyle, technology, travel, cooking and animals, as well as testimonies and letters from readers and activist articles in the fight against homophobia and lesbophobia.
