= Pink (magazine) =

American LGBT magazine

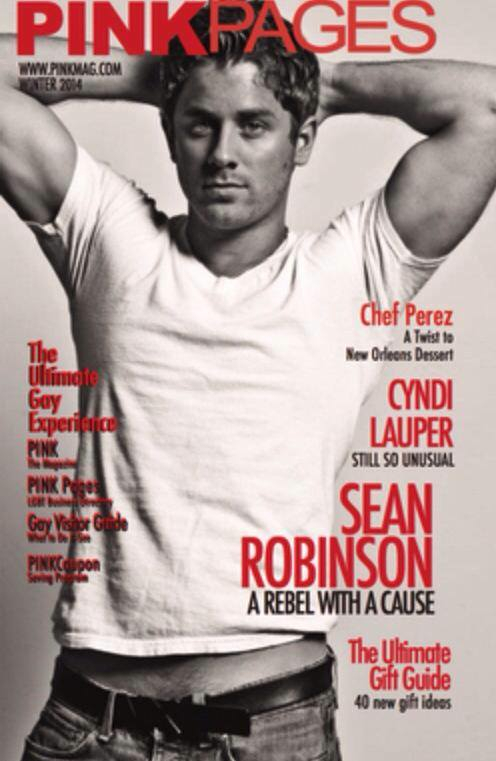
- Pink magazine cover 2014
- Editor-in-chief: Jason Freeman
- Frequency: Quarterly
- Publisher: David Cohen
- First issue: 1990
- Company: Pink Pages Inc.
- Country: United States
- Language: English

Pink is a quarterly LGBT-focused full-color glossy print magazine launched in 1990 in New York City and headquartered in Chicago, Illinois with content geared toward major markets in San Francisco, New York City, Denver, Los Angeles and Seattle as well as a national edition.

The magazine sometimes sponsors community events. In 2007, they held a fundraiser for the re-election of San Francisco mayor Gavin Newsom, and a "Cupid's Back" Valentine's fundraiser for the GLBT Historical Society. In 2008, they co-hosted "Ladies Night at Charanga," a benefit for the Stop AIDS Project.
