= Erie Gay News =

Monthly newsletter in Pennsylvania, US

- Type: Monthly newsletter
- Format: Half legal sheet
- Editor: Deb Spilko and Michael Mahler
- Founded: January, 1993
- Language: English
- Headquarters: 1115 W 7th Street; Erie, Pennsylvania 16502, United States
- ISSN: 2159-1792
- OCLC number: 694108900
- Website: eriegaynews.com

Erie Gay News is a monthly newsletter reporting news and current events concerning the gay community in the Erie, Pennsylvania, region. It was first published by a local gay man as a double-sided single sheet on a monthly/bi-monthly basis, beginning in early 1992. Beginning in January 1993, it was published on a monthly basis as a multiple-page document.

== History ==
First published n a monthly/bi-monthly basis by a local gay man in Erie, Pennsylvania in early 1992 as a double-sided, single sheet, the Erie Gay News grew in popularity among members of Erie's gay community as a source for news and current events. By January 1993, it had become a multiple page publication distributed on a monthly basis.

The first local Family Portrait was taken on the steps of the Erie County Courthouse on October 28, 1995, and appeared in the special December 1995 issue for Erie PA's Bicentennial, and a copy of that issue was placed in a time capsule in the Bicentennial Tower at the foot of State Street. The time capsule is scheduled to be opened in 2095.

The first run of Erie Gay News was published monthly through December 1999. The editorial staff for most of the first run was Deb Spilko, Michael Mahler and Mike Miller. At that point, it was exclusively published on the web.

In September 2002, the decision was made to again begin publishing in print, beginning with the issue cover dated for December, 2002. The editorial staff currently consists of Deb Spilko and Michael Mahler.

In February 2008, Erie Gay News was selected for inclusion in the EBSCO Publishing LGBT Life with Full Text index. This index is marketed to the library marketplace. All current and past issues are now included. Archive copies of both runs of the print editions are also in the collections at Canadian Lesbian and Gay Archives in Toronto, Gerber/Hart Library in Chicago, Homodok-LAA/IHLIA of IHLIA LGBT Heritage in Amsterdam, ONE National Gay & Lesbian Archives in Los Angeles, The Pat Parker/Vito Russo Center Library in New York City, and Sexual Minorities Archives in Holyoke, MA. Archive copies are also included in ProQuest's collection.
