= The Empty Closet =

American LGBTQ magazine

- Type: Quarterly magazine
- Publisher: Rochester Rainbow Union with Rathaus Press
- Founded: 1971
- Language: English
- Headquarters: 50 Prince St, Rochester NY; United States
- OCLC number: 5737153
- Website: The Empty Closet
- Free online archives: Archives hosted by the University of Rochester

The Empty Closet is a free magazine published by the Out Alliance (previously called Gay Alliance of the Genesee Valley), based in Rochester, New York. The Empty Closet reports on issues of interest to the local and national LGBT and allied communities.

== History ==
The Empty Closet began publication in January 1971 by the University of Rochester Gay Liberation Front student group. Some of the founding members were Bob Osborn, Larry Fine, RJ Alcalá, Marshall Goldman, Debbie Lestz, Pattie Evans (her pseudonym during the early publications was Patricia Evers), Karen Hagberg, and Sue Minor. It is one of the longest continually published newspapers in the United States focusing on the LGBT community. It was a newspaper until February 2018. The last issue of The Empty Closet was published in July 2020 when the supporting agency, Out Alliance shuttered. The final Editor, Tamara Leigh, who was also the magazine's first African-American editor (November 2018 - July 2020) went on to create Blaque/OUT Magazine in September 2020. After the hiatus, The Empty Closet relaunched on a quarterly publishing schedule, as opposed to the previous monthly, starting with a summer issue in 2026. Upon the relaunch, the magazine is now published by the Rochester Rainbow Union in combination with Rathaus Press.

== Importance ==
In February 2011, the New York State Senate passed Resolution K130-2011, "Commemorating the 40th Anniversary of The Empty Closet", noting the contributions of the newspaper to creating an atmosphere of social tolerance in the Rochester region: "This progressive paper has been a powerful tool in documenting the social, political, religious, cultural, artistic, business and literary history and events for the GLBT community of Rochester and surrounding areas."

In 2013, a complete run of The Empty Closet was transferred to the Smithsonian National Museum of American History Archives for preservation.
