= Gay People's Chronicle =

American newspaper

The Gay People's Chronicle was a free, biweekly newspaper published by KWIR Publications, reporting news and current events concerning the gay community of the state of Ohio. It was founded in February 1985 by Charles Callender, a Case Western Reserve University anthropology professor. Originally, it was published monthly for the Cleveland area, but later it could be found statewide, as well as in neighboring communities of Northern Kentucky, Pennsylvania, and West Virginia. It ceased publication on December 25, 2015.
