= Out & About Newspaper =

American LGBT newspaper

- Type: Tabloid
- Publisher: Jerry Jones
- Founded: 2002
- Ceased publication: 2021
- Language: English
- Headquarters: POB 330818, Nashville, TN 37203-7505
- Circulation: 30,000
- Website: outandaboutnewspaper.com

Out & About Newspaper was a free, monthly LGBT newspaper published in Nashville, Tennessee from 2002 to 2021.

== Overview ==
Out & About Newspaper was started in 2002. The newspaper has a target audience of more than 250,000 people. Circulation for the newspaper is 30,000 per month. It is the largest LGBT publication in Tennessee. The newspaper ceased in 2021.

== Out & About Today ==
The newspaper is produced alongside a broadcast news feature on WTVF-TV called "Out & About Today". "Out & About Today" was hosted by Brent Meredith, Pam Wheeler, and Chuck Long. The news feature focused on news, entertainment, and business information for the gay and lesbian community of Nashville.

== Theft ==
In August 2012, it was revealed that a thirty-year employee of the Vanderbilt University Medical Center was caught on surveillance cameras stealing copies of the newspaper to throw them away since April of the same year.
