= PREF mag =

2004–2011 French gay magazine

Préférences Mag or PREF mag
- Frequency: Bimonthly
- First issue: March 2004
- Final issue: March 2011
- Company: Prefmag Editions
- Country: France
- Based in: Levallois-Perret, Paris
- Language: French
- ISSN: 1775-8092

PREF mag or Préférences Mag was a French bimonthly gay magazine founded in March 2004. The magazine was part of Prefmag Editions. The headquarters was in Levallois-Perret. It was a competitor of the magazine Têtu. It was known for its high quality images among other attributes. Although it was a leading prominent and well selling publication for the gay communities it faced criticisms for being politically bland and not embracing non-consumeristic aspirations. They included some more risque content including supportive of LGBT families and open-marriages in line with that of modern French culture. They also were supportive of non-standard views of masculinity and how one's sexuality should conform to traditional models.

PREF mag ceased publication in March 2011.

== See also ==
- Illico
