= Out Traveler =

LGBT travel magazine

- Founded: 2003
- Final issue: 2008 (print)
- Company: Pride Media
- Country: United States
- Language: English
- Website: www.outtraveler.com

Out Traveler is a gay and lesbian travel magazine from the publishers of Out and The Advocate, combining photography with coverage of LGBT travel topics. Published as a stand-alone title from 2003 to 2008, it was subsequently incorporated as a supplement to Out magazine and is no longer available for subscriptions as a stand-alone title.

Several Out Traveler Guide travel books were also published under the brand for travel destinations such as Hawaii (written by the magazine’s Editor in Chief Matthew Link), New York City, Paris and South Florida. According to the publisher, these guides are intended to "inspire sophisticated travelers by showcasing thoughtful and transformative travel experiences that set the standard of gay travel."

== History ==
- In 2000, Out & About LGBT travel newsletter was acquired by PlanetOut Inc.'s PlanetOut.com, a Web portal for gays and lesbians. After being sold to PlanetOut Inc., the newsletter continued publication until 2004, when it was folded into 'thee Out Traveler magazine, which promoted friendly ski resorts in North America and in the world, and made a list of gay friendly cities and tourist destinations. It also continued the annual Editors Choice Awards, citing best and worst destinations for gay travel.
- The Out Traveler was launched in October 2003 by LPI Media and was later acquired by Here Media.
- LPI Media launched Outtraveler.com in conjunction with the 2003 launch of the magazine
- In 2008 Here Media ceased publication of The Out Traveler as a stand-alone publication and redirected the Out & About website to its consolidated Out Traveler website.
- In 2017, Here Media sold its magazine and website operations to a group led by Oreva Capital, who renamed the parent company Pride Media.
- On June 9, 2022, after OUT acquisition, Mark Berryhill was named CEO of equalpride. Joe Lovejoy is CFO and Mike Kelley is President of Global Growth and Development. Diane Anderson-Minshall is now the Global Chief Content Creator. This put Out Traveler under LGBTQIA Ownership again.

== Out Traveler Reader's Choice Awards ==
The Out Traveler Reader's Choice Awards were launched by Editor in Chief Matthew Link in 2004 as a way to recognize the best of LGBT travel. The awards address topics such as Favorite Domestic Destination, Favorite International Airline, Favorite Gay Resort Town, and Favorite Hotel Collection.

- American Airlines was named best Airline in 2005, 2007, and 2008
- San Francisco LGBT Pride Celebration & Parade was named Favorite Gay Event in 2006
- Key West was named Favorite Gay Resort Town in 2006
- Fort Lauderdale was named the Reader's Choice for Top Gay Destination in 2007
