= Die Insel (magazine, 1926–1933) =

German gay magazine

Die Insel: das Magazin der Ehelosen und Einsamen (The Island: The Magazine of the Celibate and Lonely) was a homosexual-oriented magazine published by Friedrich Radszuweit between September 1926 and March 1933. It was the literary supplement of the Blätter für Menschenrecht (Journal for Human Rights). At its height, it claimed a circulation of 150,000.
