= Q-Notes =

American LGBT newspaper

- The Jan. 9, 2010 front page of QNotes
- Type: LGBT bi-weekly newspaper
- Format: Tabloid
- Owner: Pride Publishing & Typesetting
- Publisher: Jim Yarbrough
- Founded: 1986
- Headquarters: 920 Central Ave. Charlotte, N.C. 28204; United States
- Circulation: 11,000
- Website: www.goqnotes.com www.q-notes.com

Q-Notes is a lesbian, gay, bisexual and transgender (LGBT) newspaper serving North Carolina and South Carolina. It is based in Charlotte, North Carolina. Published every other week, it has a circulation of 11,000 print copies and is the largest print publication serving the LGBT community in the American Southeast. The paper traces its origins to the monthly newsletter of the Queen City Quordinators, a Charlotte LGBT organization, which they began publishing in 1983. In 1986, Qnotes changed to a monthly tabloid. In 2006, it merged with the Raleigh, N.C. LGBT newspaper The Front Page.

== General information ==
Q-Notes is published every other week on Saturdays, with a print circulation of approximately 11,000. It is distributed in all major cities in North Carolina and in Columbia, South Carolina and by subscription. The paper covers news, politics, opinion, entertainment, art, lifestyle and other topics. It is the largest LGBT news publication in the Carolinas, with reach to parts of Tennessee, Virginia and Georgia. It is the largest LGBT print news publication in the Southeast.

== Origins ==
Q-Notes was originally started in 1983 as a monthly newsletter, named Queen City Notes, printed on 8.5x11 paper and distributed by the now defunct Queen City Quordinators, a local non-profit LGBT community organization. The newsletter was published for two years and grew to 12 pages an issue with paid advertising. It ceased publication due to lack of volunteer manpower. In 1986 Q-Notes was reborn as a monthly print newspaper published by Queen City Quordinators and later under the auspices of C.A.N. (Charlotte Advocacy Network) Inc., a for-profit corporation. The first issue of the revised newspaper was distributed in June 1986. Don King was hired part-time as the paper's first editor. QCQ President Jim Yarbrough, Dean Gaskey, Joel Smith and Robert Sheets kept the publication operating until it was bought by Yarbrough in December 1989. In 1991, Yarbrough left another job to take over operation of the publication full-time. Jim Yarbrough, the owner of Pride Publishing and Typesetting, Inc., bought the publication from C.A.N. Inc. in December 1989. In 1996, Q-Notes began distributing every other week.

== Distribution ==
The paper is distributed in several cities and towns across the Carolinas. Besides its hometown of Charlotte, it is distributed in Asheville, Chapel Hill; Columbia; Durham; Greensboro; Greenville; Raleigh; Wilmington, Winston-Salem and more. The paper also has distribution points and subscribers in Florida, Georgia, New Jersey, New York, Tennessee, Washington, D.C. and West Virginia.

The newspaper is also published online, with daily news updates, event calendars and community resource listings.

== History ==
=== Merger with The Front Page ===
On May 12, 2006, Q-Notes merged with the Raleigh, N.C., based The Front Page, a Raleigh, N.C. LGBT newspaper founded in 1979.

=== Online presence ===
On April 17, 2008, Q-Notes debuted its new website. The new incarnation of the almost decade-old website featured daily news updates and staff blogs and allowed reader comments to be posted to any story. The site is using a modified version of the WordPress blogging platform as a content management system

The older version of the paper's website had been a simple and static HTML design, requiring hours of behind-the-scenes construction for each bi-weekly issue.

In January 2010, the newspaper unveiled a newly redesigned website.

In September 2021, the newspaper launched QnotesCarolinas.com, as a new online hub of local LGBTQ news, voices and community information.

=== 2008 Democratic presidential primary ===
On April 30, 2008, seven days prior to the May 6, 2008, North Carolina primary, Q-Notes published online three interviews. Two were with Democratic candidates Hillary Clinton and Barack Obama. The third was with Clinton aide Mark Walsh. Obama's interview also included comments from aide Eric Stern. Chris Crain, former editor of The Washington Blade criticized Q-Notes coverage as it did not include information that the interviews had been conducted via email. Q-Notes later edited their Q&As including notations that the interviews were conducted via email.

=== Physical changes ===
For the July 26, 2008, issue the Q-Notes staff changed the traditional quarter fold of the newspaper to a flat layout, reflecting the layout more typical of an average, weekly tabloid newspaper or news-magazine. The traditional two sections of the newspaper, the front, more news-oriented section and the back, arts and entertainment section, were rolled into a single stitched section. In late 2008, the paper began using full, front page images on the front cover rather than have story text in a traditional newspaper layout.

An example of the Q-Notes front page before the 2010 rebranding and redesign.

=== Distribution changes, growth ===
In October 2009, Q-Notes announced it would stop distribution of its print edition to most regions in South Carolina. In a letter from publisher Jim Yarbrough, the newspaper said it would concentrate most South Carolina print copies in the state capital of Columbia. The paper continues to distribute to some community organizations and businesses in Greenville and Myrtle Beach.

Despite changes in the newspaper's circulation strategies, the closure of Window Media's Southern Voice and South Florida Blade on November 16, 2009, made the Carolinas newspaper the largest LGBT print news publication in the Southeast.

=== New editorial direction ===
In January 2009, Q-Notes began rebranding its print edition and online presence. A new layout for the print edition accompanied an online redesign and new editorial strategy. Former editor Matt Comer wrote, "With our change in aesthetics comes a change in our editorial direction. Our bi-weekly print issues will be more future-oriented and contain less reporting of events past, while GoQnotes.com takes up a more robust daily presence with online only reporting of Carolinas, national and international events and news...In an effort to maintain our new, robust website and editorial direction, qnotes will be implementing a sort of "web first" model. Stories slated to appear in our print editions will be published as they are completed, or as a set of stories in the day or two after we dispatch our content to our printer. No more waiting the painfully slow and long five days between press time and street date."

== Staff ==
- Publisher: Jim Yarbrough - Oversees daily operation of all aspects of the newspaper, from financial matters to employment and occasional editorial decisions.

The paper has several regularly contributing freelance writers and columnists.

.
