= Dean Phillips 2024 presidential campaign =

American political campaign

- Campaign: 2024 U.S. presidential election (Democratic Party primaries)
- Candidate: Dean Phillips; U.S. Representative from Minnesota (2019–2025)
- Announced: October 27, 2023
- Suspended: March 6, 2024
- Headquarters: Excelsior, Minnesota
- Key people: Steve Schmidt (advisor); Alondra Cano; Jeffrey P. Weaver (senior advisor); Zach Graumann (campaign manager)
- Receipts: US$6,931,364.37 (March 31, 2024)
- Slogan(s): Everyone's Invited; Make America Affordable Again

Website
- dean24.com (archived - March 5, 2024)

Dean Phillips, the U.S. representative from Minnesota's 3rd congressional district, announced his campaign for the 2024 United States presidential election on October 27, 2023. He was one of three major candidates who challenged incumbent President Joe Biden in the 2024 Democratic primary, alongside environmental lawyer and activist Robert F. Kennedy Jr. and author Marianne Williamson.

Phillips' campaign was considered to be a "long-shot" run by Roll Call and NBC News. Phillips is generally considered a moderate Democrat. Phillips argued during his campaign that president Biden would be a weak general election candidate due to his age and low approval ratings. Phillips campaigned as a younger alternative to Biden, who would be a stronger opponent to Trump. On December 23, 2023, Phillips argued that Biden should “thoughtfully exit” the 2024 race. In public, Phillips was ridiculed. In private, others in the Democratic Party shared his concerns. On March 6, 2024, Phillips suspended his campaign following Super Tuesday.

Phillips was the second-placed person in terms of awarded delegates in the 2024 Democratic Party presidential primaries. Four delegates to the 2024 Democratic National Convention in Chicago were pledged to Phillips, compared to 3,896 for Biden and 36 to uncommitted. Phillips' delegates were gained from Ohio's 2nd, 6th, and 14th congressional districts and Logan County, Nebraska.

== Background ==
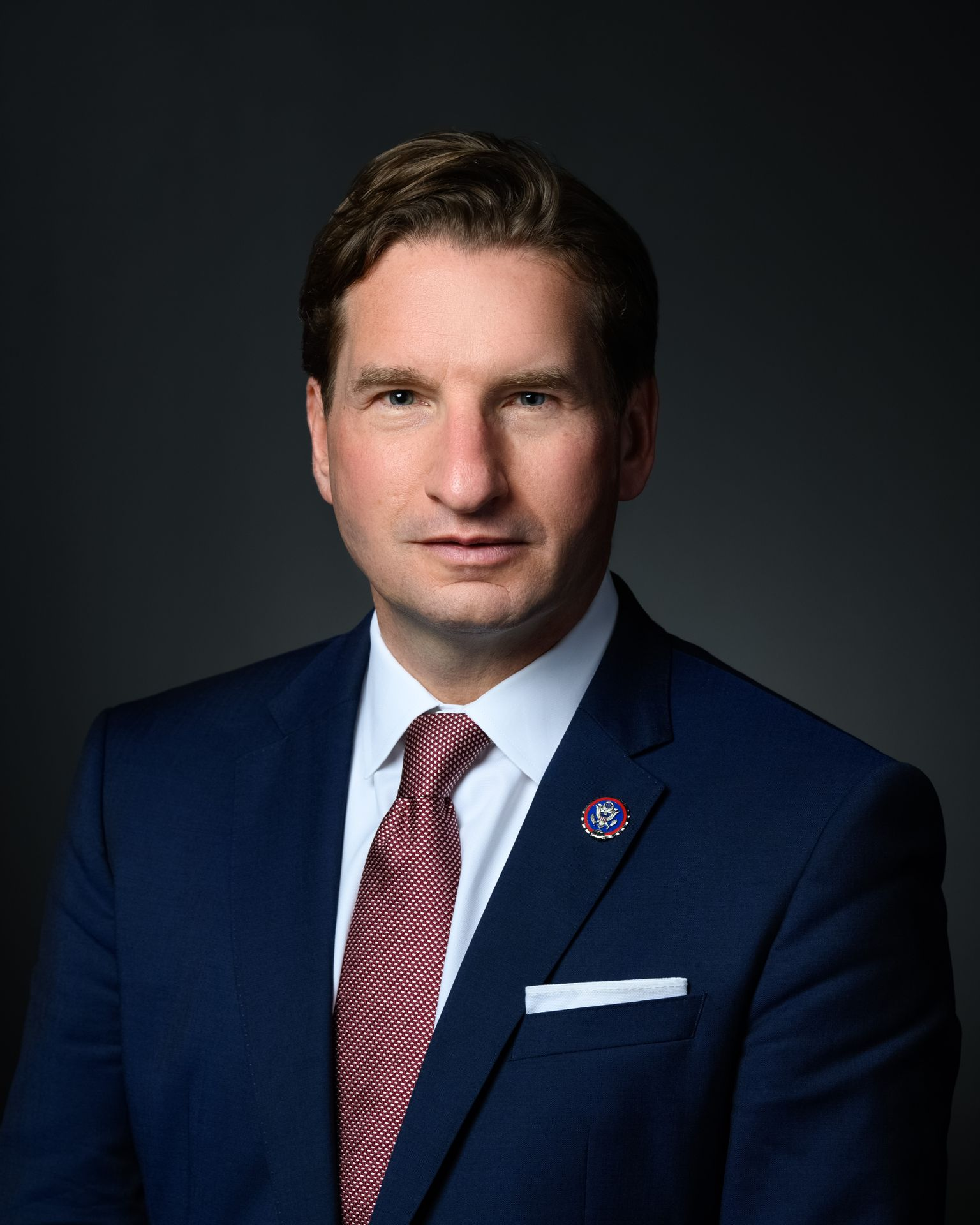
Phillips as a representative, 2021

In July 2022, Phillips became the first incumbent Democratic member of Congress to say President Biden should not run for re-election and called for "generational change" pointing to Biden's age, adding that he believed political competition should be healthy. On August 2, 2022, Democratic U.S. Representative Angie Craig from Minnesota's 2nd Congressional District was asked by MinnPost whether she would support President Biden if he ran for reelection in 2024. In response, Craig did not state her position on whether she would support Biden's potential reelection campaign. Instead, she expressed agreement with Phillips, who had previously called for "generational change" within the Democratic Party, stating they were in lockstep and alignment with the need for a “new generation” of Democratic leadership up and down the ballot.

After the White House holiday party in December 2022, at which he believed the president's decline was too graphic to ignore, Phillips was left with no doubt in his mind—Biden was unfit to serve a second term.

In July 2023, Phillips said he was considering challenging President Joe Biden in the 2024 Democratic presidential primaries. Before launching his campaign, Phillips reportedly reached out to other elected Democratic officials, such as Governors Gretchen Whitmer and JB Pritzker, to convince them to enter the presidential primary race to oppose Biden, but they declined to speak with him directly. In October 2023, he announced that he would step down as co-chair of the House Democratic Policy and Communications Committee because his views on the 2024 presidential race were incongruent with the majority of his caucus. Many elected Democrats in Congress urged Phillips not to launch a primary bid against Biden. Politico reported that Bakari Sellers, a former South Carolina state legislator, suggested it would be a waste of time for Phillips to even file to get on the ballot when applications open in November. Sellers also said, “We'll laugh at the people who voted for Dean Phillips and then just move on to, you know, celebrating Valentine's Day.” Phillips filed the paperwork to run with the Federal Election Commission on October 26.

== Campaign ==
=== Announcement ===
Phillips' presidential campaign logo.

Phillips officially announced his candidacy on October 27, 2023, in Concord, New Hampshire. Phillips told CNN his entry into the race “was not about me,” but “my inability to attract other candidates, to inspire the president to recognize that it is time, compels me to serve my country because it appears that President Joe Biden is going to lose the next election.”

On the day of the campaign launch, Phillips was asked by The Daily Beast about receiving a donation from Harlan Crow, a major donor to the Republican Party and close friend of Supreme Court Justice Clarence Thomas, for his 2020 re-election. Phillips responded that he did not recall speaking with or meeting Crow.

Phillips' announcement of his candidacy sparked pushback from his House colleagues, such as Representative Pramila Jayapal. On October 29, 2023, during an interview on NBC's “Meet the Press”, Jayapal stated about Phillips' candidacy that, “Everyone's got the right to run, but I'm sorry, I have no idea what he is running on that is different from what President Biden is running on. He took the same bold stances that President Biden has taken in this country on domestic issues. And I really don't see what he is doing.”

=== Staff and advisors ===
Phillips hired Jeff Weaver, a top consultant for Bernie Sanders' presidential campaigns, as a senior strategist. His senior staff also included Zach Graumann, who had served as campaign manager on Andrew Yang's 2020 presidential campaign.

Steve Schmidt, a former advisor to Senator John McCain, aided with the campaign launch, but planned to leave the campaign to form an independent super PAC. Schmidt said the super PAC would support Phillips through advertising in New Hampshire, South Carolina, and Michigan. Schmidt stated regarding Phillips not being well-known was an asset, as he did not have years of “political stink on him” to overcome, and “you can get famous very fast in American politics."

Phillips' campaign reportedly struggled to secure quality vendors and consultants due to fears that they would lose out on major Democratic clients for stepping out against their party.

=== Campaign events ===
In November 2023, the Nelson A. Rockefeller Center for Public Policy and the Social Sciences at Dartmouth College and the Dartmouth Political Union co-hosted a discussion with Phillips as part of their "Path to the Presidency" speaker series to discuss his campaign and policy positions.

In New Hampshire, Phillips hit the campaign trail with a “Dean Phillips for President” bus, and his 1960 International Harvester milk truck, dubbed the “government repair truck,” made an appearance repainted with “Dean Phillips for President.”

Phillips said his campaign depended on alternative media platforms to get his message across after being stonewalled by MSNBC and CNN, which haven't afforded him an interview after providing a town hall for every Republican primary challenger to Trump.

Phillips held several Southern California fundraisers, including one hosted in the home of television executive Adam Goodman, who previously served as president of Paramount Pictures and DreamWorks SKG.

On November 3, Phillips appeared as a guest on an episode of “Real Time with Bill Maher.” Comedian Bill Maher lauded Phillips but stopped short of a full endorsement. On November 11, Phillips joined the Prof G Pod with Scott Galloway podcast for an interview. On November 17, Phillips joined the All-In podcast for an interview.

On November 18, Phillips discussed the case for his campaign at the 2023 Blue Jamboree rally hosted by the Charleston County Democratic Party in South Carolina.

On November 30, Phillips visited the Pod Save America studio to discuss his run against Biden in the Democratic primary.

On December 4, Phillips spoke at Franklin Pierce University in Rindge, New Hampshire, for its Pizza and Politics event. On December 5, Phillips spoke to college students at Keene State College as part of the college's American Democracy Project. On December 6, Phillips spoke at a cannabis dispensary in Maine, where he said that Biden was on the wrong side of history," referring to Biden's lack of action to legalize marijuana at the federal level. On December 8, Phillips met with voters at a veterans' home in Tilton, New Hampshire and at a town hall in Exeter, New Hampshire.

During an X Spaces forum, Phillips said that, in his first 100 days as president, he intends to build "the most extraordinary bipartisan cabinet in American history." As for other first 100-day priorities, Phillips also said he intended to use “zero-based budgeting” and hire an international consulting firm to conduct a “top-down assessment” of the federal government.

During a January trip to New Hampshire, Phillips remarked that he found both the city of Washington D.C. and the reluctance of his fellow Democrats to call on Biden not to run again to be distastefully insular and partisan. On January 12, Phillips made a guest appearance on The Breakfast Club radio show. On January 15, Phillips was interviewed by the Fung Brothers on their YouTube channel. On January 17, Phillips made a campaign stop at Post and Beam Brewing in Peterborough, New Hampshire. On January 18, Phillips held campaign events in Manchester and Hanover, New Hampshire, with 2020 Democratic Primary presidential candidate Andrew Yang. On January 20, Phillips was a guest on the Modern Wisdom podcast with Chris Williamson to discuss his campaign. On January 22, Phillips met with voters at a meeting of a Rotary Club in Nashua, New Hampshire.

On January 27, President Biden and Phillips spoke about their bids for the Democratic Nomination at the South Carolina Democratic Party's First-in-the-Nation Celebration dinner in Columbia, South Carolina.

In February, Phillips announced layoffs to a lot of his staff members and also canceled his plans to campaign in Michigan.

=== Criticism of Joe Biden ===
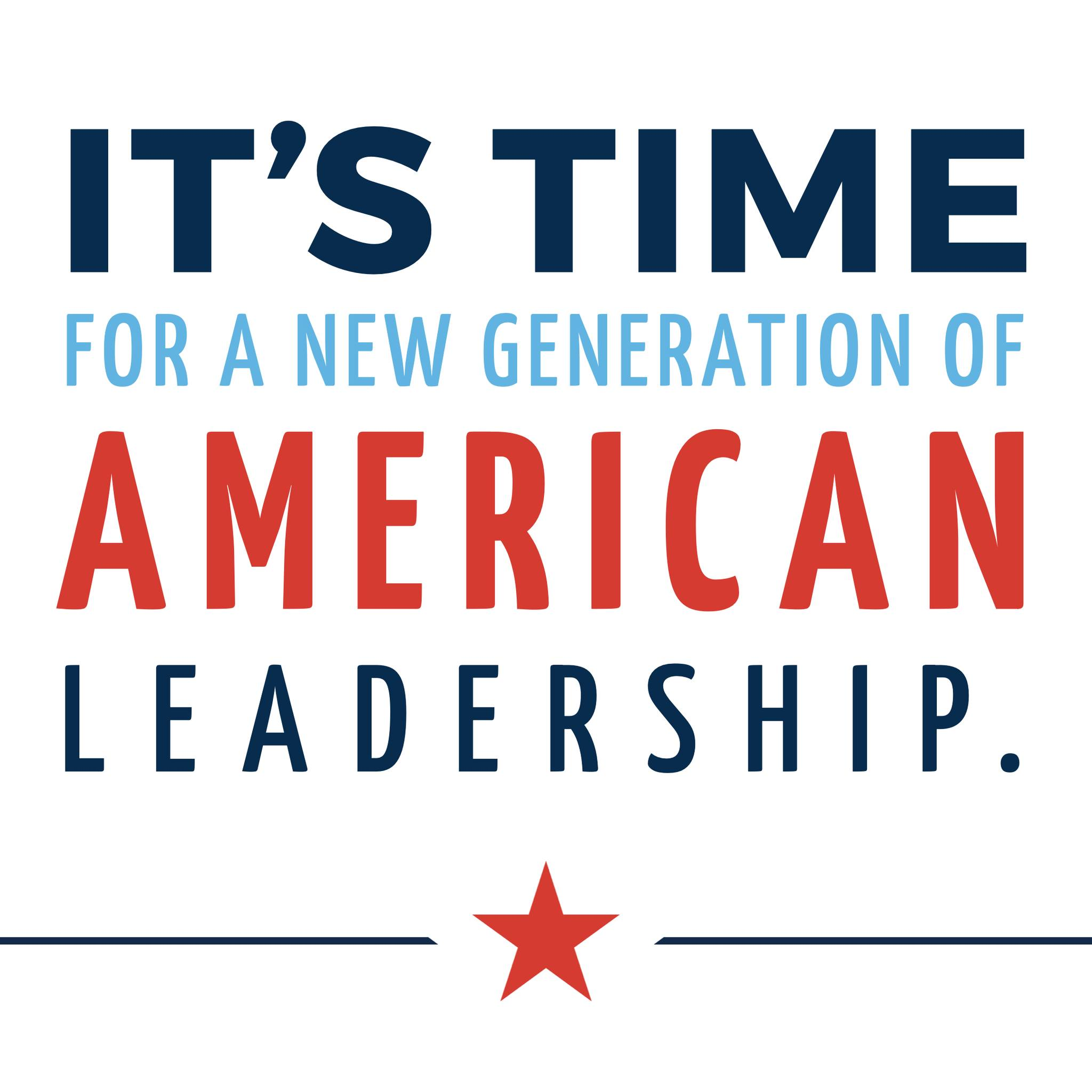
Phillips' secondary presidential campaign logo.

On December 14, 2023, during an appearance on “Meet the Press NOW,” Phillips criticized Biden's candidacy, stating that “The president is not a threat to democracy, but running and suppressing other candidates is a threat when you are behind in the polls, like he is.” Phillips also added, “He's a good man and someone I respect. But this delusion that he can win is a threat to democracy.”

In January 2024, Phillips told Axios that he thought it would be "impossible" for Biden to do the job of president for four more years, remarking that "At that stage of life, it is impossible ultimately to conduct, to prosecute the office of the American presidency in the way that this country in the world needs right now. That is an absolute truth."

Phillips insisted throughout his campaign that the Democratic Party had become "delusional" for thinking that Biden could defeat former President Trump in a rematch. In a statement for a Business Insider story, a Phillips spokesperson chastised his Democratic colleagues who spoke ill of Phillips' primary bid against Biden. "Rep. Phillips extends his thanks to his friends in Congress for their kind words and encouragement — it takes real courage on their part to sit back and reject democracy in favor of a coronation that will hand our country back over to Donald Trump," the spokesperson said.

=== Ballot access disputes with DNC and state Democratic parties ===
Phillips filed his candidacy to make the New Hampshire ballot on the last day candidates were able to file. Representative Bennie Thompson called Phillips' decision to campaign in New Hampshire, rather than South Carolina, "disrespectful" to voters of color," while then-House Assistant Democratic Leader Jim Clyburn stated that Phillips was not "respecting the wishes of the titular head of our Party."

Due to his late entry, Phillips missed the deadline to file for the Nevada primary. He was criticized by Nevada Senator Catherine Cortez Masto, as well as Representative Dina Titus, for skipping the state.

Phillips objected to being left off the primary ballots of several states by their respective Democratic parties, including in Florida, North Carolina, and Tennessee. Phillips filed challenges with the Democratic National Committee (DNC) and those state parties and stated he was considering legal options to regain ballot access. In those states, there is no explicit filing process with the state Democratic parties to be placed on the ballot, only assumptions that campaigns would correspond with state parties to obtain ballot access for primaries.

Phillips said that the DNC's letter stating that New Hampshire's presidential primary was 'meaningless' and not to seat any delegates to the convention based on the results was, “one of the most egregious affronts to democracy that I’ve ever seen in my entire lifetime as an American, period.”

The Florida Democratic Party's executive committee voted to cancel their primary at the end of October 2023 and declare Biden the winner ahead of a November 30 filing deadline, saying that they had not heard from Biden's challengers. Phillips criticized the cancelled primary as "intentional disenfranchisement" and a "blatant act of electoral corruption". Phillip's campaign showed CNN copies of two letters that it had sent on November 7 to the Florida Democratic Party while the Florida Democratic Party said that it had not heard from them until November 22, while acknowledging that "there's no requirement for presidential candidates to do anything to get on the ballot". Under Florida law, state parties are allowed to decide who to include on their primary ballots. An independent, third party lawsuit has been filed against the Florida Democratic Party in order to include candidates other than Biden. In his statement to Politico, when Phillips called the handling of the primary process by the Florida Democrats a “blatant act of electoral corruption” he then demanded Biden “condemn and immediately address” it. He also said, “Americans would expect the absence of democracy in Tehran, not Tallahassee. The intentional disenfranchisement of voters runs counter to everything for which our Democratic Party and country stand. Our mission as Democrats is to defeat authoritarians, not become them.” Andrew Yang who was assisting Phillips' cause told ABC News, "What's happening in Florida is important -- do we live in a democracy or not? If the Democrats can simply cancel their own primaries they should change their name to something else."

The Tennessee Democratic Party decided to list only Biden as a ballot option for its primary after a November 11 meeting, where they affirmed that Biden's campaign was the only one that had reached out that could be properly vetted before their deadline. Phillips has challenged their decision by submitting over 3,000 signatures in a petition to the Tennessee Secretary of State on December 5, potentially overcoming the party decision.

The North Carolina Democratic Party acknowledged receiving requests for ballot access from Phillips and other candidates, but chose to only include Biden for its primary, stating that other candidates failed to meet standards for inclusion, such as media recognition and advocacy, having a donor base, and active campaigning in the state.

The Democratic Party of Wisconsin left Phillips off the ballot; he appealed to the Wisconsin Supreme Court on January 26, 2024. The court unanimously ruled on February 2 that Phillips should be included on the ballot.

On November 9, 2023, asserting that his campaign was hampered by ballot access policies and a lack of candidate debates, Phillips issued an apology to Bernie Sanders, regretting his previous disbelief towards Sanders's 2016 campaign's complaints of biased rules by the DNC governing the presidential primary. When asked for comment, Sanders responded, "He's changed his views now that he's a candidate? I'm not getting involved in this."

Phillips argued that the Democratic establishment was choking off his challenge because it couldn't accept that ‘Biden is going to get creamed’ by Trump in November. Phillips told the New York Post that, “Those who endeavor to have the audacity to practice democracy as I have are excommunicated. There lies the biggest risk to democracy: When people with different perspectives... go against their party, we now live in an era where that not only is not welcomed but it results in banishment.”

Phillips accused representatives of the Biden campaign of using access to pressure liberal media outlets into blackballing and not platforming him. The New York Times reported that during his campaign, Phillips found himself “deplatformed,” taken off the ballot in some states, and rarely invited on television to make his case. Phillips said that, “I don't know how to better articulate these efforts than, yes, a threat to democracy by undermining it and suppressing it”. Phillips also accused the Democratic National Committee of actively obstructing Democrats and Independents from ballot access — “bleeding campaigns dry” by handing out lawsuits against non-incumbent candidates and "absurd signature requirements."

=== Criticism of Kamala Harris ===
In November 2023, Phillips questioned the competency of vice president Kamala Harris should she succeed to the presidency. He said while every interaction he'd had with her had been "thoughtful" interactions, others had told him "she's not well positioned, well prepared, of the right disposition, of the right competencies to execute that office." He also referenced Harris's approval ratings were lower than Biden's. Phillips received pushback from Harris supporters, including his congressional colleagues Robert Garcia and Lisa Blunt Rochester. The next day, Phillips apologized to Harris on social media for referencing opinions of others in contrast with his personal experience.

In late October 2024, Phillips expressed his concern that the Harris campaign's focus on Trump, rather than her positive message, would result in a losing campaign, writing that “A billion dollars will have been wasted on losing voters by condemnation versus winning them by invitation. She just needed to be clear about what she believes, what she will do differently than Biden, and offer common sense solutions to our problems."

== Debates and forums ==
On December 6, 2023, TYT Network hosted a forum featuring Democratic primary candidates Williamson, Phillips and Uygur. Biden was invited but declined to attend. The candidates responded to the GOP debate being held in Tuscaloosa, which was scheduled to end at the same time. The discussion was moderated by John Iadarola, the main host of The Damage Report on the same network.

On January 8, 2024, Phillips participated in a debate against Marianne Williamson hosted by New England College in Manchester, New Hampshire. To qualify, candidates needed to be registered on the New Hampshire primary ballot and poll at more than five percent. The debate was broadcast on satellite radio by SiriusXM and was moderated by Josh McElveen, who was the former political director of WMUR.

On January 12, 2024, NewsNation hosted a forum featuring Phillips and other Democratic presidential candidates. Biden was invited but did not attend. The discussion was moderated by Dan Abrams.

On January 19, 2024, Phillips was part of a forum held at the Artisan Hotel in Tuscan Village, Salem, New Hampshire. It was hosted by the Rotary Club and the Southern New Hampshire Chamber of Commerce.

== Primary results ==
Phillips received 19.9% of the vote in New Hampshire, a state that awarded no delegates due to violating calendaring rules, coming in second behind a write-in campaign for Joe Biden. There were no delegates at stake in the New Hampshire primary because the Democratic National Committee said state party officials violated national party rules by scheduling its contest earlier than allowed.

Phillips received only trifling support in South Carolina (1.7%) and Michigan (2.7%) and was not on the ballot in Nevada. On February 4, 2024, after his loss in South Carolina, Phillips vowed to remain in the race as "a mission of principle". On Super Tuesday, Phillips came in third to Marianne Williamson or uncommitted in most other states. In the Maine Democratic presidential primary, Phillips received 7.1% of the total vote cast. In the Utah Democratic presidential primary, Phillips received 4.5% of the vote. In Phillips' home state of Minnesota, he received 7.8% of the vote, and came in third behind Biden and uncommitted. Three delegates were awarded from Ohio, and one delegate was awarded from Nebraska. In the 2024 Ohio Democratic presidential primary, Phillips received 12.9% of the total vote and over 15% of the vote in three of the state's congressional districts. He received the most votes of any candidate in Logan County, Nebraska, with 55.6% of the vote. Based on the Nebraska Democratic presidential primary results where Phillips received 9.8% of the total vote, one Dean Phillips delegate represented Madison County at the Nebraska Democratic State Convention that was held in Hastings on June 7–9. In the Oklahoma Democratic presidential primary, Philips received a plurality in Cimarron County. In the Missouri Democratic presidential primary, Phillips tied with Biden in Clark County. In the Pennsylvania Democratic presidential primary, Phillips received 6.4% of the total votes cast, with 69,765 votes. In the South Dakota Democratic presidential primary, Phillips received 9.6% of the vote. In the California Democratic presidential primary, Phillips received 2.8% of the total votes cast, with 100,284 votes. Phillips earned a total of 529,486 votes in the Democratic presidential primary.

Phillips finished as the second-place person in terms of delegates to the Democratic National Convention. Four delegates to the 2024 Democratic National Convention in Chicago have been awarded to him.

== Endorsements ==
Notable endorsements of Phillips

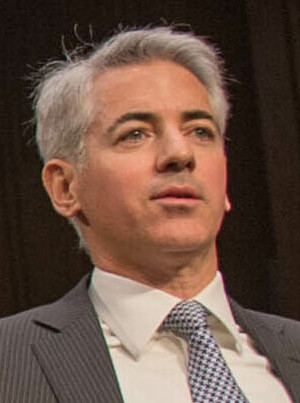
Bill Ackman, hedge fund manager

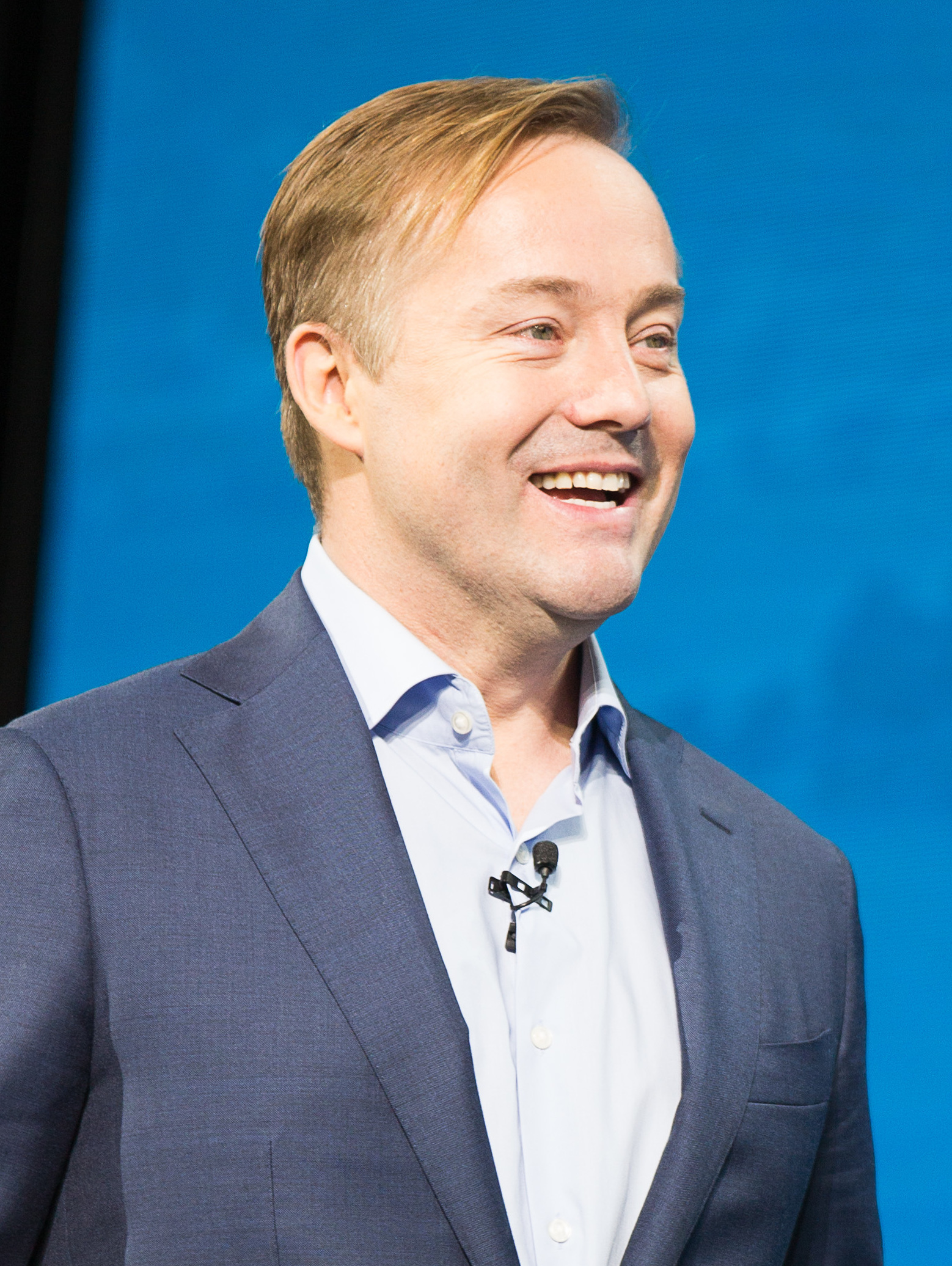
Jason Calacanis, investor

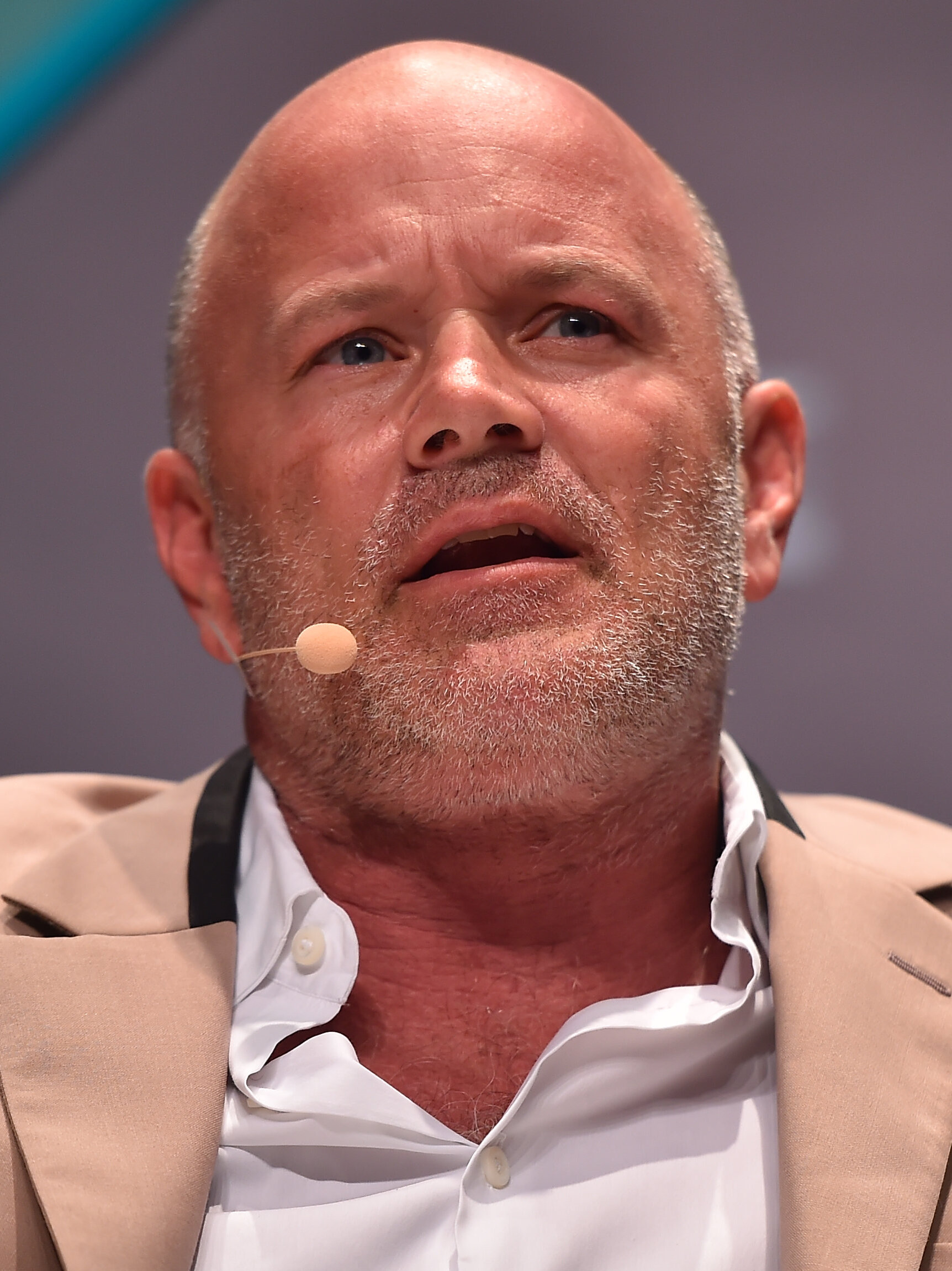
Michael Novogratz, investor

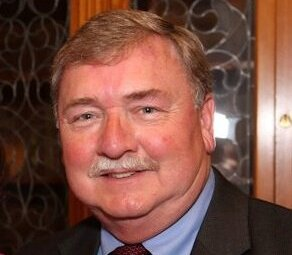
Steve Shurtleff, New Hampshire state representative

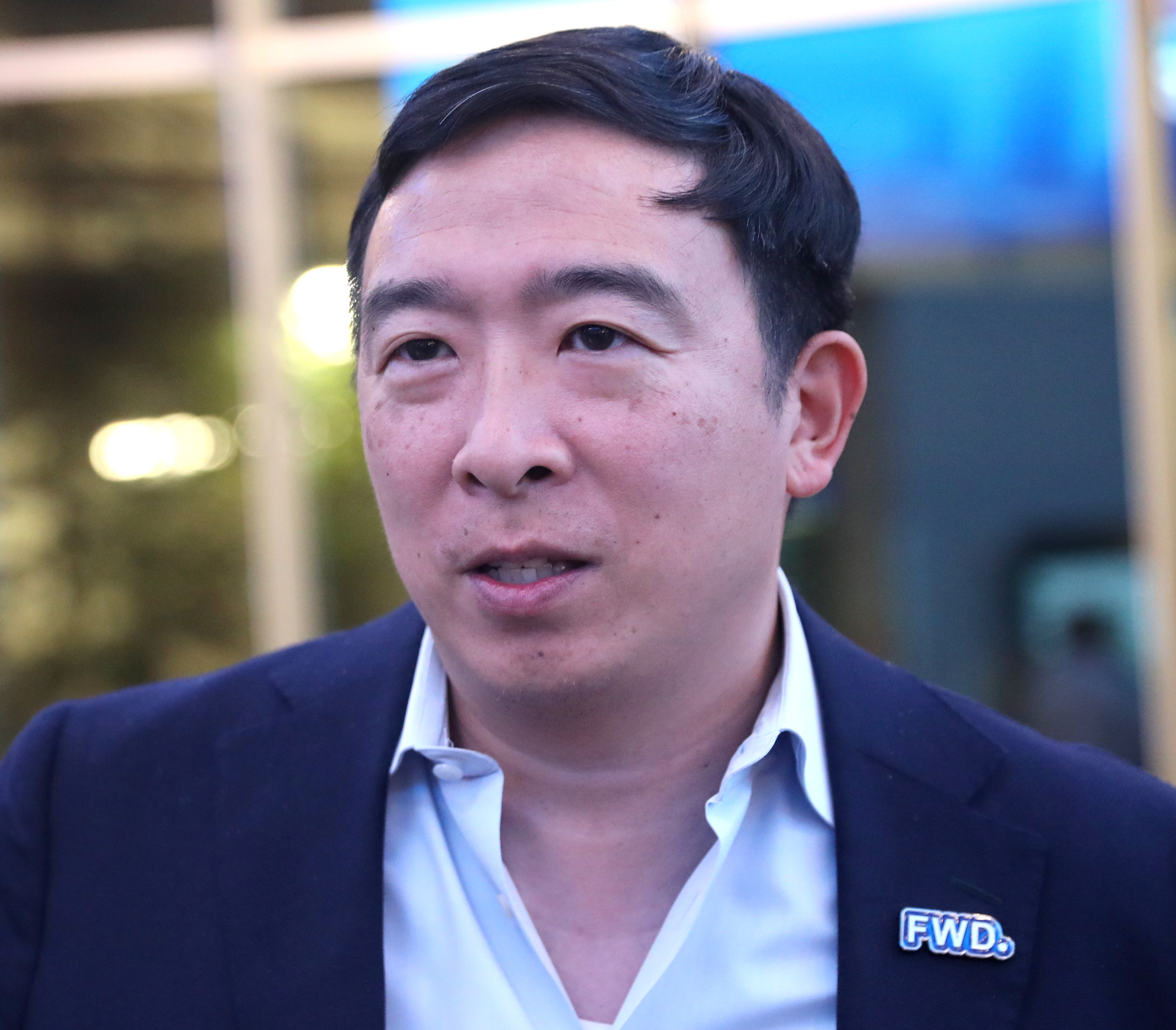
Andrew Yang, businessman and presidential candidate in 2020

Phillips received his first endorsement from New Hampshire state representative Steve Shurtleff, who stated his main reason for doing so was Biden allowing the Democratic National Committee to attempt to strip the state of its first in the nation status. Shurtleff stated in January 2023 that he would endorse a candidate other than Biden if this were to occur. Phillips also received an endorsement from Tom Schamberg, New Hampshire state representative from the 4th district, Merrimack.

Andrew Yang expressed support for Phillips's campaign soon after its launch, and co-hosted a campaign event with Phillips in New Hampshire.

In January 2024, billionaire hedge fund manager Bill Ackman said that he was supporting Phillips' campaign, donating $1 million to his We Deserve Better campaign PAC.

More notable individuals that endorsed Phillips are angel investor and podcaster Jason Calacanis, son of Vinod Khosla and CEO of Curai Health Neal Khosla, entrepreneur and philanthropist Jed McCaleb, and CEO of Galaxy Investment Partners Michael Novogratz.

Phillips received endorsements from the editorial boards of the New Hampshire Union Leader, Conway Daily Sun, and The Detroit News.

== Political positions ==
=== Foreign policy ===
==== Israel–Palestine ====
Phillips is pro-Israel. He supports a two-state solution and has criticized Israeli Prime Minister Benjamin Netanyahu's opposition to Palestinian statehood. Phillips has defended Israel against accusations of apartheid.

Phillips has criticized Biden's handling of the hostage crisis during the Gaza war. In a November 2023 interview with Abby Phillip on CNN, he stated that he would not accept the ceasefire, which mandates the release of 50 hostages in exchange for 150 Palestinian prisoners in Israel during a four-day break in fighting. Phillips called it "absurd, shocking, and dismaying" that American hostages are still being held in Gaza, stating he would not agree to the deal unless "every single American citizen" was released.

==== Ukraine-Russia ====
Phillips cheered President Biden's October 19, 2023, call for the continued support of funding for Ukraine in its war against Russia.

=== Domestic policy ===
==== Abortion ====
Philips is pro-choice and said that he is "angered and devastated" by the overturning of Roe v. Wade. Phillips is a member of the Pro-Choice Caucus in Congress. In 2021, the Planned Parenthood Action Fund endorsed Phillips's re-election bid to Congress. After Roe v. Wade was overturned, he supported bills to protect women's reproductive rights, including HR 8297 and HR 8111, which aim to ensure access to abortion and reproductive health care across states, and HR 3755.

==== Artificial intelligence ====
Phillips pledged that if elected president, he would establish a “Department of AI” to ensure the nation is prepared to deal with the development of AI.

==== Campaign finance reform ====
On May 10, 2022, Phillips received an A+ on the anti-corruption and voting rights scorecard from End Citizens United for "rejecting corporate PAC money and supporting once-in-a-generation anti-corruption and voting rights legislation."

==== Cannabis ====
Phillips pledged, if elected president, he'd "immediately" work toward legalizing cannabis at the federal level. Phillips has had a consistent record of cannabis reform advocacy in Congress, championing bills like the MORE Act and the SAFE Banking Act.

==== Climate action ====
Phillips has been a prominent proponent of legislative measures aimed at reducing greenhouse gas emissions, addressing the impacts of climate change, and fostering the development of more resilient communities in Congress. Furthermore, he has displayed his support for and contributed his vote to the climate investments integrated within the Inflation Reduction Act. Phillips co-sponsored HR 2307, the Energy Innovation and Carbon Dividend Act, and HR 8395, the EPA Regulatory Authority Act of 2022. The Sierra Club endorsed Phillips's re-election bid to Congress for his environmental advocacy.

==== Congressional stock trading ban ====
Phillips does not support members of Congress trading stocks while in office. In 2021, Phillips co-sponsored the TRUST in Congress Act requiring lawmakers, their spouses, and dependent children to place assets in a blind trust while they're in office.

==== Equity and restorative justice ====
Phillips is a member of the Congressional Equality Caucus in Congress.

==== Healthcare ====
On December 20, 2023, Phillips signed on as a co-sponsor of the Medicare for All Act. This marked a departure from his earlier position on healthcare; he said that he had previously been "convinced through propaganda that single-payer healthcare was a nonsensical leftist notion". He cited a confluence of factors that shifted his view in support of Medicare for All, including his experience caring for his daughter who had been diagnosed with Hodgkin lymphoma, the financial strain of providing health insurance to his employees as a business owner, and the dynamics of representing a congressional district which included the headquarters of UnitedHealth Group as well as many residents who struggled to access healthcare. Also, Phillips said that he had “some differences of opinion on some of the transitional plans and some of the parameters” of the “Medicare for All” bill.

==== Immigration ====
Phillips advocates for a comprehensive approach to immigration reform, including a streamlined procedure for individuals seeking lawful entry into the country. Phillips proposed changing the U.S. asylum process by filing cases in migrants’ countries of origin. Phillips supports a pathway to citizenship for "those here now" and for "children of undocumented immigrants.”

==== Jobs and the economy ====
Phillips has a diverse business development and oversight background, encompassing experience with start-ups and progressive advancement within his family-owned enterprise, Phillips Distilling. His journey culminated in assuming the leadership of the organization. Phillips subsequently played a key role in the development of Talenti Gelato. Phillips campaign slogan is “Make America Affordable Again,” which is a play both on former President Donald Trump's political movement and high voter dissatisfaction with the economy, especially with inflation and sustained high prices.

Phillips expressed that he wants to modify the tax code to allow families to deduct their childcare expenses, raise the minimum wage to $15 an hour, and make housing an all-hands-on-deck priority. Phillips pledged that, “as president he would not be letting an unelected bureaucrat in the Senate decide whether people are going to get a higher minimum wage or not.” Phillips has said that he wants to work in a bipartisan fashion and create a committee to recommend "balanced action" to support entitlement programs such as Social Security and Medicare. Also, Phillips supports targeting student debt aid to help those with the "greatest need" and making college more affordable.

==== Public safety ====
Phillips championed the Pathways to Policing Act, which aimed to provide funding to enhance officer recruitment efforts.

Phillips voted to mandate background checks on every firearm sale, including sales online and at gun shows. Also, he has said that red-flag laws "work."

In 2018, the gun safety organization Giffords, founded by former Congresswoman Gabrielle Giffords, endorsed Phillips in the race for Minnesota's 3rd congressional district. In a statement, Giffords praised Phillips for his commitment to cut ties between Congress and special interests, particularly the gun lobby.

In 2020, Phillips received an endorsement from Brady: United Against Gun Violence for working across party lines to pass needed gun violence prevention bills.

==== Public education ====
Phillips is a cosponsor of the IDEA Full Funding Act. This legislation aimed to finally ensure Congress fulfills its commitment to fully fund the Individuals with Disabilities Education Act (IDEA). Phillips has expressed that he supports intensive mentoring programs for new teachers.

==== Term limits for Congress and the Supreme Court ====
Phillips has advocated for an 18-year term limit in the House of Representatives, the Senate, and the Supreme Court.

== Suspension of campaign ==
In January, Phillips was asked during a press gaggle if he would run as a third-party candidate if he lost the primary. Phillips stated that "under no condition" would he run as a third-party candidate. Pressured to answer if he would dissuade others from running third party, Phillips told reporters they weren't focused on the issues Americans care about, like the economy, inflation, health care, Social Security, homelessness, and education.

On March 6, 2024, following losses on Super Tuesday, Phillips suspended his campaign and endorsed Joe Biden. In the Super Tuesday contests, Phillips failed to make inroads among the thousands of Democratic primary voters who signaled their openness to an alternative to President Biden. After the endorsement, President Biden called Phillips on the phone. Phillips said the two “had a wonderful conversation” that ended in an invitation to discuss the state of the 2024 race at the White House. Also, following Phillips’ exit from the presidential race, Biden thanked Phillips on social media for his “kind words” and welcomed him to the team, saying, “We need you with us.”

After dropping out of the race, Phillips blamed the national political parties, the media, and “apathetic” voters for his campaign's failure, and continued to warn that a Biden-Trump rematch would result in a loss for Democrats. Additionally, Phillips expressed surprise at the strength of the two-party system, and said it had resulted in “a decreasing focus on the country and an increasing focus on winning.”

In reflecting on his campaign, Phillips said, “I had a network of donors who could have financially supported the campaign, but most of them were too scared to touch it. If you want to maintain your access to power, you have every incentive not to speak up.”

On July 11, 2024, Phillips received an apology from Jermaine Johnson, a Democratic State Representative from Richland County, South Carolina, on behalf of the individuals who criticized, ignored, and shunned him despite not being one of them himself. On July 19, Phillips received an apology from D.J. Tice, an opinion columnist for the Minnesota Star Tribune, for his self-described past snide coverage of Phillips' presidential campaign.

== Aftermath ==
=== Continued calls for Biden to drop out ===
Asked to comment on Biden's performance in the first presidential debate on June 27, 2024, Phillips responded: "Gandhi said to speak only when it improves upon the silence." Politico reported after the first presidential debate that a former senior Biden White House official said, “No Labels and Dean Phillips won this debate,” referring to the outsider efforts to push a different candidate, not named Trump or Biden, into the race.

In response to the first presidential debate, Phillips was given credit for his early questioning of Biden's bid for reelection by the research director of the American Economic Liberties Project Matt Stroller, journalist and founder of the media company The Free Press Bari Weiss, entrepreneur David O. Sacks, professor of Economics and Political Science at Duke University Timur Kuran, former U.S. Senator from Minnesota Norm Coleman, and former Team USA's gold medal men's coach for curling at the Winter Olympics Phill Drobnick.

On July 21, Phillips urged House and Senate Democrats to hold an "immediate vote of confidence" by secret ballot. He suggested if "confidence" won, Democrats would commit to aggressively mobilizing behind Biden, but Biden must end his candidacy if "no confidence" won. Despite claiming that he still endorsed Biden, Phillips also stated “it is time to step aside and turn this over to a new generation.”

Biden would ultimately withdraw from the election later that day.

=== Endorsement of Kamala Harris ===
The day after Biden announced his withdrawal, Phillips endorsed Kamala Harris for the Democratic nomination. However, Phillips advocated for a process to hear from alternative candidates. Phillips suggested a straw poll of delegates ahead of the Democratic National Convention to determine the party's top four presidential contenders, followed by four town halls where candidates would outline their platforms ahead of a vote for the nominee at the convention. Ultimately, no one challenged Harris for the nomination; Phillips expressed his disappointment in a lack of competition.

=== Post-Biden withdrawal ===
After Biden's withdrawal, Phillips explained that his intention had always been to encourage Biden to "pass the torch" and step aside in favor of a new generation of leadership. Phillips told the Minnesota Star Tribune: “If people write anything, I just hope that they might write if [Biden] had debated me then and he had been on one stage, unscripted, with a national audience, and he demonstrated that decline then, this would have been very different circumstances.” Phillips noted that after Biden's withdrawal, some of his colleagues better understood why he ran. At the Democratic National Convention, Phillips told Politico he felt his mission was accomplished with Harris as the nominee, saying “I was trying to be a Paul Revere, not a George Washington.”

Phillips was given credit for his early questioning of Biden's bid for reelection in the aftermath of Biden's withdrawal by the lead Washington anchor for CNN Jake Tapper, editorial page writer Barton Swaim for The Wall Street Journal, journalist Jack Shafer, and political commentator Tim Miller. Additionally in July 2024, Kenneth Baer, an Obama administration official and former deputy director of Speechwriting for Al Gore, called for Phillips to keynote the Democratic convention. On August 17, 2024, an opinion column in the Duluth News Tribune argued that "the Democratic Party owes Dean Phillips an apology."

Phillips was a superdelegate to the 2024 Democratic National Convention.

=== Post-election ===
After the presidential election, Phillips was asked by a journalist Shannon Bream if he felt overlooked by his party this year over the course of the campaign and election, to which he responded, “My voice, yes, was ignored, but tens of millions of Americans’ voices were ignored and suppressed and disenfranchised.”

In an interview with the Nation after the election, Phillips said, “My run wasn't about me. It was about having a legitimate, invitational, competitive, spirited primary. That means debate. And had there been other candidates on a primary stage, I'm almost certain that Americans, at least Democratic primary voters, would have selected someone in a better position to ultimately beat the most dangerous Republican candidate of our lifetime.”

The HuffPost reported that after the election, Phillips said of his White House bid, “I would do it a thousand times again.” And he continued, “My only regret — and it's a big one — is that so many of my colleagues who felt exactly the same way couldn't find the courage to say and do something about it.”

In an interview with CBS News Minnesota, regarding being the only Democrat in Congress who challenged Biden in the primaries, Phillips said, “If this is vindication it sure doesn't feel that good. And what I have told so many is that I am not a savant. I didn't see anything that others weren't seeing in Washington and around the country. I was just willing to say something about it.”

=== Praise of campaign ===
On December 28, 2024, Politico asserted that Phillips was right about Biden's re-election campaign, and that his decision to launch a primary challenge proved prescient after Biden's disastrous debate with Trump. On the same day, The Guardian also reported that Phillips is “saddened” to be vindicated by the accuracy of his prediction at the time that the outgoing president could not win re-election.

Since Donald Trump won the 2024 presidential election, many political commentators gave Phillips credit for his early questioning of Biden's bid for reelection, including New York Times columnists Michelle Cottle, Ezra Klein, and Bret Stephens, Politico's politics bureau chief and senior political columnist Jonathan Martin, journalist James Surowiecki, staff writer at The Atlantic Thomas Chatterton Williams, founder and editor-in-chief of The Lever David Sirota, Democratic political strategist Jessica Tarlov, political commentator and former political director at ABC News Mark Halperin, former Chief Political Analyst for NBC News Chuck Todd, former CNN political reporter Chris Cillizza, comedian Jon Stewart, radio co-host of The Breakfast Club Charlamagne tha God, the editorial board at The Wall Street Journal, weekly columnist for the Washington Post Marc Thiessen, historian Talmage Boston, national affairs correspondent for The Nation magazine Jeet Heer, the Minnesota editor for Patch Media William Bornhoft, journalist Michael C. Moynihan, senior editor for Reason and co-host of The Hill's web news commentary series program Rising Robby Soave, Boston media commentator Sue O'Connell, journalist Ken Klippenstein, columnist on the Minnesota Star Tribune editorial board Rochelle Olson, and chief political reporter for KSTP-TV Tom Hauser.

Phillips was listed by Mother Jones as a "Hero of 2024" for what they called his "protest campaign." Phillips also received praise for his early warnings from U.S. Representative Lloyd Doggett (D-TX), former U.S. Representative Tim Roemer (D-IN), former U.S. Representative Joe Cunningham (D-SC), and former U.S. Representative John Delaney (D-MD). The Washington Free Beacon speculated whether Phillips could be the frontrunner in 2028 for the Democratic nomination for president due to challenging Biden in the primaries.
