= Katharine Long =

Katharine Long or similar names may refer to:

- Lady Catharine Long (1797–1867), English novelist and religious writer
- Kathleen Long (1896–1968), English pianist and teacher
- Katherine Long (died 1969), English animal welfare activist, co-founder of Beauty Without Cruelty
- Catherine Small Long (1924–2019), American congresswoman from Louisiana
- Kate Long (storyteller), American writer, journalist and songwriter
- Kate Long (born 1964), English author (The Bad Mother's Handbook)
- Kathy Long (born 1964), American kickboxer, mixed martial arts fighter and actress
- Kath Long, English environmental scientist, co-founder in 2010 of Well Grounded with Iola Leal Riesco
- Kat Long (born 1974), American journalist, author and social historian
- Catherine Crosby Long (born 1980), American beauty pageant winner, Miss Alabama 2003
- Katie Long (born 1988), English field hockey forward
- Kay Long (1920–2007), British javelin thrower
