= The New York Blade =

Weekly newspaper in NYC focused on LGBT issues

- Logo of newspaper
- Type: LGBTQ Weekly newspaper
- Format: Tabloid, 52 pages/issue
- Owner(s): HX Media, LLC
- Publisher: HX Media, LLC
- Editor-in-chief: Kat Long
- Editor: Trenton Straube
- Founded: 1997
- Ceased publication: 2009
- Language: English
- Headquarters: New York City
- Circulation: 22,000 free copies
- Website: thenewyorkblade.com

The New York Blade was a free weekly newspaper focusing on lesbian, gay, bisexual and transgender (LGBTQ) issues in New York City, New York. The Blade was a member of the National Gay Newspaper Guild, and contained news, entertainment, classified ads, and free personals for men and women.

== History ==
The New York Blade was founded in 1997 as a New York edition of the Washington Blade. The paper immediately came under fire from gay rights advocates because of indications that it would be half-owned by News Communications; straight ownership. They were also criticized for choosing objective reporting over LGBT advocacy and not having an editorial page.

When the New York City Police department started a campaign to hire LGBT police officers, they placed advertisements in the newspaper.

The paper featured Alison Bechdel's comic strip Dykes to Watch Out For.

The paper, along with the Washington Blade, was acquired by Window Media, LLC in 2001, and both were then sold to HX Media in 2007.

Kat Long succeeded Trenton Straube as editor-in-chief in February 2009. Shortly after, the paper ceased its publication in July 2009.

== See also ==
- History of LGBT in journalism
- LGBT culture in New York City
- List of LGBT periodicals
