= Norm Kent =

American publisher, attorney, radio show host, writer (1949–2023)

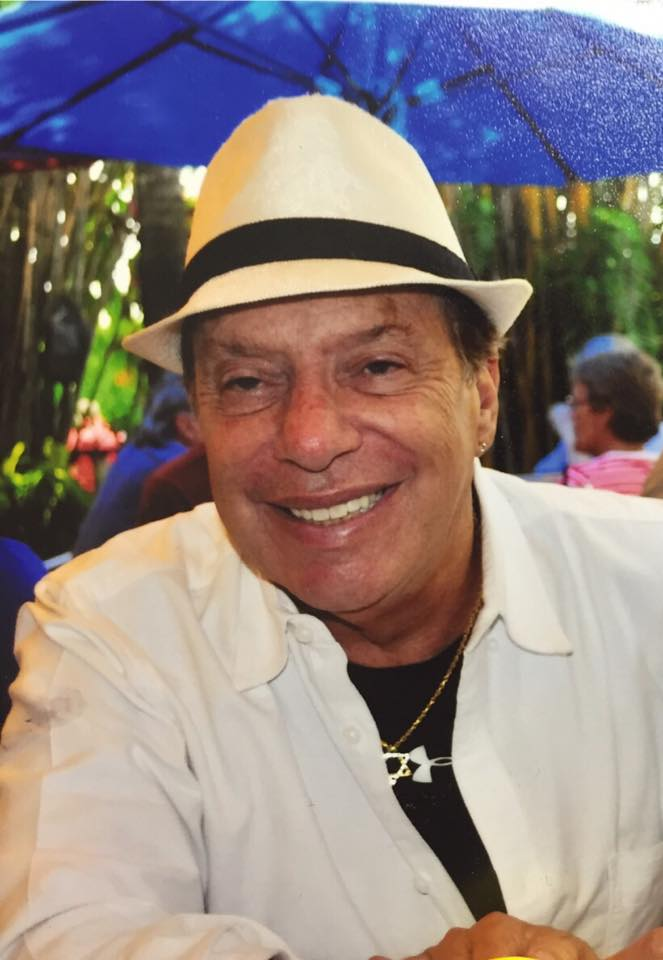
- Born: Norman Elliot Kent; October 18, 1949; New York City, U.S.
- Died: April 13, 2023 (aged 73); Fort Lauderdale, Florida, U.S.
- Education: Hofstra University
- Occupations: Publisher; attorney; radio show host; writer

Norman Elliott Kent (October 18, 1949 – April 13, 2023) was an American criminal defense attorney, publisher, and radio talk show host.

The founder and publisher of The Express, in 1999, and South Florida Gay News in 2009. Kent was previously the morning drive talk show host for WFTL-1400 AM from 1989 to 1992, when he left the station by quitting on-air. As an attorney, Kent brought suit against local governments in Florida on behalf of civil rights such as Freedom of Speech many times.

A frequent guest lecturer at colleges and in community forums, Kent published numerous articles advocating for civil rights protections for the LGBT community and the legalization of cannabis in the United States. He authored 'The Pot Warriors Manifesto.' His articles on representing gay men illegally entrapped by law enforcement, along with illegal searches by law enforcement, were picked up by the National Academy of Criminal Defense Lawyers' magazine, The Champion.

Kent's clientele consisted of the prominent late radio talk show host, Neil Rogers, and talents Phil Hendrie and Al Rantel. He also assisted in the civil rights defense of activist Dan Choi during his White House protests, along with numerous South Florida celebrities and personalities who had legal encounters and challenges with law enforcement. Al Goldstein and his SCREW magazine also found a formidable defender with Kent as their counsel.

After surviving a bout with lymphoma, he had another stint at the new WFTL-850 AM from 2002-2005 as a daily talk show host, though in the interim periods he hosted Weekend Legal on various local radio stations, including WWNN-1170 AM.

Kent was a life member of the National Academy of Criminal Defense Lawyers and the Florida Criminal Defense Lawyers Association. He appeared on Dateline NBC, Court TV, Fox News and Fox and Friends, as well as CNN Live, as a political and legal commentator. In 2014, as the Chair of the Board of Directors of NORML, he was a frequent guest on HLN's Nancy Grace Show, advocating for the legalization of cannabis. As a constitutional rights attorney, he represented juveniles in a class action against detention centers, and sued to enjoin the State of Florida from illegally spraying paraquat on marijuana fields.

A graduate of both Hofstra University in 1971 and the Hofstra School of Law in 1975, Kent relocated to Fort Lauderdale, Florida in 1976, where he maintained an independent law practice for over 40 years, practicing as the Criminal Defense Law Center of South Florida, alongside his law partner, Russell Lonnie Cormican.

After two years of battling pancreatic cancer, Kent entered hospice care at his longtime home in Fort Lauderdale's Victoria Park in March 2023. He died on April 13, at the age of 73.

== Marijuana legalization advocacy ==
A longtime advocate for marijuana law reform, he served as the Chairman Emeritus of the Board of Directors of the National Organization for Reform of Marijuana Laws (NORML) and contributed articles to High Times Magazine. During his long career, he successfully represented clients who defended marijuana use based on medical necessity, such as Elvy Musikka, who now receives cannabis supplies quarterly from the US government.

As far back as 1972, Kent was involved in Hofstra and NY NORML. In 1982, as a Florida attorney, he sued the United States for an injunction to bar the spraying of the toxic herbicide paraquat onto marijuana fields inside the state. The government eventually abandoned the plan. In December 2012, the National Legal Committee of NORML awarded Kent its highest honor, the Al Horn Memorial Award for Lifetime Achievement.

In 2007, his defense of marijuana decriminalization led to a national debate with a former classmate at Hofstra University, then-U.S. Senator Norm Coleman from Minnesota. Kent published a response letter at Celebstoner.com outing Coleman's contemporary positions on marijuana law reform, comparing it to his days as a user when he was a college student and classmate. Norm Kent and Norm Coleman were college classmates, and the letter from Kent revealed the hypocrisy of Coleman's "war on drugs" position considering the way they used to "tape the doors shut and burn incense" during their college days together. This became a talking point during Coleman's 2008 campaign against Al Franken.

== LGBT advocacy and newspapers ==
Kent began Express Gay News, an LGBT newspaper in Broward County, South Florida in 1999. Four years later it was sold to Window Media to be a part of their larger umbrella of national gay media sources. It was then re-titled The Express and then The South Florida Blade. On November 16, 2009, all publications under Window Media management were shut down because of the financial status of its parent company, Window Media and its majority stockholder, Avalon Equity Partners.

Kent published South Florida Gay News, which became one of the largest gay weekly newspapers in the State of Florida, with over 500 drop-off points from Key West to West Palm Beach, and St. Petersburg to Orlando. SFGN also published The MIRROR Magazine, a full-size, content-driven, glossy LGBT quarterly. The newspaper ceased publishing upon Kent's passing.
