= The Georgia Voice =

American LGBTQ newspaper

Georgia Voice
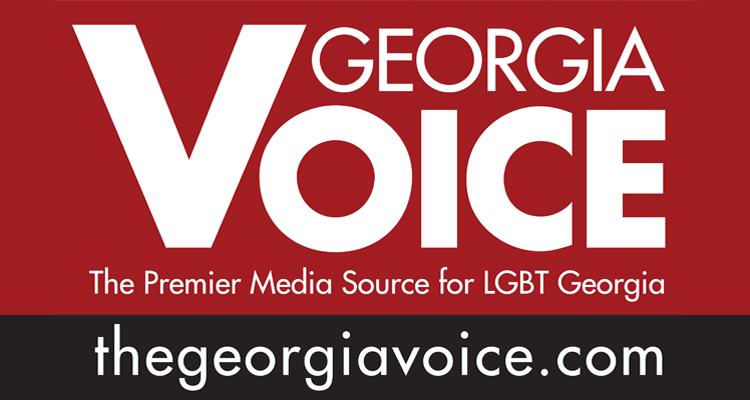

- Cover of the October 14, 2011, issue
- Type: Monthly print newspaper; LGBT newspaper
- Owner: Rough Draft Atlanta
- Founder(s): Chris Cash, Laura Douglas-Brown, Tim Boyd
- Publisher: Keith Pepper
- Editor: Collin Kelley
- Founded: 2010
- Language: English
- Headquarters: Atlanta, Georgia
- Website: thegavoice.com

The Georgia Voice is an LGBT-oriented newspaper based in Atlanta, Georgia. The paper updates its website continuously and produces a monthly print edition. The newspaper debuted on March 19, 2010.

== History ==
The Georgia Voice emerged from the financial collapse of Window Media in November 2009. Window Media had acquired Southern Voice—Atlanta's primary LGBT newspaper, founded by Chris Cash in 1988—in 1997, along with several other LGBT publications across the country. When Window Media declared bankruptcy, Southern Voice ceased publication without warning on November 16, 2009.

Cash reached out that same day to Laura Douglas-Brown, who had been serving as editor of Southern Voice, and to Tim Boyd, and the three launched The Georgia Voice in March 2010, continuing Southern Voice's mission of serving Atlanta's LGBTQ community. Several former Southern Voice staff members joined the new publication.

In 2022, Cash was inducted into the NLGJA LGBTQ Journalists Hall of Fame for her decades of work in LGBT journalism.

In December 2024, the paper was acquired by Rough Draft Atlanta, a local hyperlocal news organization headed by publisher Keith Pepper, after founder Tim Boyd sought a buyer as he approached retirement. Cash and Douglas-Brown were no longer affiliated with the paper at the time of the sale. Following the acquisition, the paper moved to Rough Draft Atlanta's website, launched a weekly newsletter, and shifted to a monthly print edition under executive editor Collin Kelley.

== Publications ==
In addition to its regular news coverage, The Georgia Voice annually publishes Destination: Gay Atlanta, the city's official LGBTQ travel guide, produced in partnership with the Atlanta Convention & Visitors Bureau.

== Recognition ==
The Georgia Voice has received numerous awards for its journalism and design. In 2025, NLGJA: The Association of LGBTQ+ Journalists named The Georgia Voice the recipient of its Legacy Award, which honors outlets that have demonstrated innovative and sustained coverage of the LGBTQ+ community over an extended period of time.
