= David Atlanta =

American gay magazine

- David Atlanta Magazine (Vol. 17, Issue 18, April 30, 2014
- Editor: Mikkel Hyldebrandt
- Categories: Gay press
- Frequency: Weekly
- Publisher: Brian Sawyer
- First issue: October 1998
- Final issue: July 2017
- Company: Peach Media Holdings
- Country: United States
- Based in: Atlanta, Georgia
- Language: English
- Website: www.davidatlanta.com

David Atlanta magazine was an Atlanta-based weekly periodical for the gay community. It was owned by gay press publisher Window Media until Window Media closed operations, and ceased publication on November 16, 2009.

On March 11, 2010, David Atlanta returned to publishing weekly issues after being purchased from the bankruptcy court by Gaydar Atlanta. In August 2010, David Atlanta was sold along with Southern Voice to DRT Media. The August 11, 2011 issue was the first under new ownership.

== History ==
Founded in October 1998, David was brought to Atlanta by Andy Jones to serve as an entertainment and lifestyle magazine for the Southeastern United States. It was the successor to a line of gay magazines dating back to 1968, beginning in Jacksonville, Florida, founded by Henry C. Godley and Mark W. Riley. The magazine was named after the Michaelangelo statue.

In 2003 the publication was bought by United Media, publisher of the Southern Voice in Atlanta, and the Washington Blade in Washington, D.C. David was merged into Window Media in 2005.

In November 2009, the magazine and its sister newspaper were shut down because of the financial status of its parent company, Window Media and its majority stockholder, Avalon Equity Fund.
