= South Florida Blade =

Defunct American LGBT newspaper

- Format: Weekly newspaper
- Founded: 2000
- Ceased publication: 2009
- Language: English
- Circulation: 20,000

The South Florida Blade, formerly The Express Gay News, was a lesbian, gay, bisexual and transgender (LGBT) newspaper in the southern Florida area. The Express was a member of the National Gay Newspaper Guild.

The Express was founded in 2000. In 2003, it was acquired by Window Media, the largest publisher of gay/lesbian weekly newspapers in the United States.

On August 28, 2008, Express Gay News underwent a drastic rebranding effort, changing format and name. The newer version of the paper, called The South Florida Blade, was edited by Dan Renzi.

According to Window Media, its circulation was approximately 20,000.

In 2009 Window Media shut down and shortly thereafter the paper was re-organized with most of the same staff by Mark Haines as The Florida Agenda. In 2010 the original publisher and founder of The Express Gay News, Norm Kent, launched a new newspaper and website South Florida Gay News.

== Financial woes ==
Avalon Equity Fund, an investment fund that owns several gay media outlets including Washington Blade, South Florida Blade, 411 Magazine, David Atlanta, Southern Voice (SOVO) and Genre magazine were found to be in a condition the Small Business Administration (SBA) refers to as capital impairment. This means that Avalon did not maintain the necessary outside investments required under the terms of loans borrowed from the SBA totaling $38M. A lawsuit filed by SBA revealed Avalon had little or no outside capital left due to divestiture by investors, losses in revenue or asset values or a combination of the three. Avalon Equity Fund is in receivership with SBA, which will allow SBA to sell off its assets to satisfy the loans.

In November 2009, the paper was shut down because of the financial status of its parent company, Window Media and its majority stockholder, Avalon Equity Partners.
