= Sovo =

SoVo may refer to:

- Someron Voima, association football club from Somero, Finland.
- Southern Voice (newspaper), an LGBT newspaper published since 1988 in Atlanta, Georgia
- Southern Voices, the annual literary magazine published by Mississippi School for Mathematics and Science
