= Bednash v Hearsey =

- Court: Court of Appeal
- Decided: 15 May 2001
- Citation: [2001] EWCA Civ 787

Case history
- Prior action: Nicholas Stewart QC

Case opinions
- Sir Martin Nourse

Keywords
- Transaction at undervalue, excessive remuneration

Bednash v Hearsey or Re DGA (UK) Ltd [2001] EWCA 787 is a UK company law and UK insolvency law case, which held that a director's pay and pension was excessive and grossly negligent, and could be recovered after the company went insolvent.

== Facts ==
Mr Lane Bednash was the liquidator of the DGA (UK) Ltd. DGA had provided engineering consulting services. Bednash sought an order under the Insolvency Act 1986 section 212 (misfeasance for breach of a fiduciary duty) and section 238 (transactions at an undervalue) against Mr Hearsey. Mr Hearsey had been the sole beneficial shareholder and controlling director of DGA. DGA had traded successfully in 1991 and 1992, but then its position had worsened. It had gone into liquidation through voluntary winding up proceedings on 24 February 1994. Apparently, in April 1994, there had been a burglary at the office by an unknown person, and all the accounts books had been stolen.

Bednash contended that Hearsey had paid himself an excessive salary and pension contributions.

== Judgment ==
=== High Court ===
Nicholas Stewart QC, for the High Court Chancery Division gave judgment on 15 February 2001. He allowed Bednash's claim in part.

In 1991 and 1992, because the company had been successful, and Mr Hearsey had adequately carried out his duties, it could not be said that pay or pension contributions were excessive. That was because there was no significant risk to DGA's creditors.

However, Hearsey's remuneration in following years was objectionable. There was a lack of clear evidence about Hearsey's actions. Despite that, if Hearsey had no reliable view on DGA's financial position, it was not responsible to pay himself large sums of money. Alternatively, if Hearsey had had a reliable view of DGA's finances, paying himself large sums of money would have also been irresponsible, because there had been a substantial risk to DGA's creditors.

=== Court of Appeal ===
Sir Martin Nourse (with whom Potter LJ concurred) upheld the decision of the High Court, after Mr Hearsey appealed.

12. As for the authorities, Miss Giret [counsel for Mr Hearsey] has relied principally on the well-known decision of Oliver J in Re Halt Garage Ltd [1982] 3 All ER 1016, from which she correctly extracts the proposition that the amount of remuneration awarded to a director is a matter of company management, and that provided there has been a genuine exercise of the company's power to award remuneration, it is not for the court to determine if, or to what extent, the remuneration awarded was reasonable. However, Oliver J went on to recognize that, if the director's remuneration was excessive or unreasonable, it would not avail him to argue that the matter had been decided by the company as a matter of company management.

13. In the last analysis, it seems clear that the reasonableness or not of the remuneration as a whole is not the decisive factor. The question is whether, in the particular circumstances, the company can afford to pay it, and whether the decision to do so has or has not amounted to gross negligence. That that is the correct test appears from the judgment of Templeman LJ in In re Horsley & Weight Ltd [1982] Ch 442, 455, where, in a passage relied on by Mance LJ, he said:

"There could have been gross negligence, amounting to misfeasance. If the company could not afford to pay out £10,000 and was doubtfully solvent so that the expenditure threatened the continued existence of the company, the directors ought to have known the facts and ought at any rate to have postponed the grant of the pension until the financial position of the company was assured."

14. Miss Giret has relied on a further passage in that judgment, where Templeman LJ warned against the dangers of hindsight in cases such as this. In other words, it is dangerous to start with the liquidation of the company and then to look back and proceed on an assumption that the liquidation has been caused by the excessive payments. However, it is not necessary to show that the liquidation has been caused by the excessive payments. The test is as I have stated it, namely whether the payment complained of was, in the particular circumstances, grossly negligent and made without a due regard for the finances of the company. Here the judge was perfectly entitled, on the facts which he found, to come to the conclusion that that test had been satisfied. Notwithstanding Miss Giret's well sustained argument, an appeal would have no reasonable prospect of success. I would dismiss this application accordingly.

== See also ==
- UK insolvency law
- UK company law
- Re Halt Garage (1964) Ltd [1982] 3 All ER 1016; (Ch D)
- Insolvency Act 1986 s 212
