= Houston Voice =

American newspaper

Montrose Star
- Type: Biweekly newspaper
- Format: Tabloid
- Owner(s): GLYP Media, LLC
- Publisher: Laura Villagran
- Founded: 1974 & 2009
- Circulation: 5,000 bi-weekly
- Price: Free
- ISSN: 2163-050X
- Website: montrose-star.com

The Houston Voice
- Type: Weekly
- Format: Web Only
- Owner: Houston Voice Media
- Publisher: Justin Galloway & Steven Tilotta
- Founded: 2011
- Price: Free
- ISSN: 2164-9243
- Website: www.houstonvoice.org

The Houston Voice, originally known as The Montrose Star, was a bi-weekly newspaper published on alternating Wednesdays in Houston, Texas. A subsequent newspaper (not by the original owners) is now known as Montrose Star ISSN (2163-050X). The newspaper is targeted to the LGBTQ community in southeast Texas as well as Austin and San Antonio.

== History of original newspaper ==
The Montrose Star was the oldest LGBT publication in Houston. The newspaper was started by LGBT Community activist Henry McClurg in 1974 as the Montrose Star. The newspaper went through several incarnations and in the late 1970s the paper became the Houston Voice. As the Houston Voice, the paper was a weekly publication through the 1980s and 1990s. It was purchased by Window Media, LLC, a national LGBT newspaper chain that also owned the Washington Blade. In 2009 Window Media shut down its operations and ceased publication of the Houston Voice.

== Re-creation ==
McClurg, who had no longer been with the Voice for sometime, had started a new publication called The Montrose G.E.M. (Gay Entertainment Magazine), but when the Voice shut down, McClurg took back the former name of the Montrose Star and published under that name. In Fall of 2009, the publication was purchased by GLYP Media, publishers of the nationwide Gay Yellow Pages. It continues as a "gay entertainment" tabloid. In November 2011 members of the Montrose Star broke off to revive the Houston Voice as the Houston Progressive Voice (Print) ISSN 2164-9243 (Online) ISSN 2164-9251.

The current Montrose Star is distributed throughout the Houston and Galveston areas and covers LGBT arts, entertainment, music and a local southeast Texas gay bar and club guide.

The Houston Progressive Voice is a bi-weekly LGBT newspaper published every other Friday in Houston, Texas. The newspaper is also known as The Progressive Voice, Pro-Vo and Houston Voice. The newspaper is distributed in the Houston area. The newspaper runs as a non-profit.

On February 14, 2012, Henry McGlurg the original publisher of the Montrose Star and Houston Voice announced plans to join the Houston Progressive Voice in a joint venture with his current Montrose Daily News and restart the original Houston Voice back up as a weekly printed newspaper. Also, the Houston Progressive Voice's website started making changes and referring to itself as the Houston Voice. The website also stated it had added the URL www.houstonvoice.org and that Nikki Araguz the American marriage equality activist, author, and public speaker would be joining the Houston Voice's editorial staff and management.

In March 2014, Houston Voice and Galloway announced that the publication was for sale and its website was taken down. Steven Tilotta also decided to end his long running column and personality under the name of Marsha Mellow and in a satire claimed she was lost at sea.
