= Jeffrey Weaver =

Jeffrey Weaver could refer to:

- Jeff Weaver (born 1976), American baseball player
- Jeffrey P. Weaver (born 1966), American political operative and campaign manager for the 2016 Bernie Sanders presidential campaign
- Jeffrey C. Weaver, historian of the American Civil War
