= Genre (magazine) =

New York Magazine

- Editor: Neal Boulton
- Categories: Gay men's lifestyle
- Frequency: Monthly
- Founded: 1992
- Final issue: 2009
- Company: Window Media
- Country: United States
- Based in: New York City
- Language: English
- ISSN: 1074-5246

Genre magazine (ISSN 1074-5246) was a New York city-based monthly periodical from 1992 to 2009 written for gay men. It was owned by gay press publisher Window Media.

== History ==
Launched in 1992 as a quarterly, Genre originally billed itself as a magazine with a focus on gay men with primary coverage on entertainment, travel and an occasional acknowledgement of political issues. As the magazine evolved, increasing to bi-monthly in 1992, and monthly in 1993, under the editorial leadership of a woman editor and songwriter, Judy Wieder, it focused more on LGBT entertainment and less on male politics. After Wieder secured a cover-story interview with Madonna, The Advocate took notice and offered Wieder a position editing The Advocate's arts and entertainment sections.

Facing increasing competition from Out, Details and The Advocate for advertiser dollars in 2000, publisher Richard Settles changed editorial and art direction to become more of an urban magazine with a focus on New York's" post gay movement fostered by an aging Generation X and former club kids, as well as those who outgrew the popular circuit party lifestyle of the 1990s. As such the publication began winning over mainstream companies such as Ford Motors, thereby proving that the LGBT demographic was a viable consumer market of society, dispelling notions of risk by association.

In yet another makeover, Genre changed editorial directions again in 2002, at the direction of co-owner and associate publisher Doug Shingleton, with editorial content given larger breadth and scope. In addition to fashion, travel and entertainment as reported by most gay national glossy publications, Genre delved into personal growth of its male readership, including spirituality issues, home design and healthful lifestyle issues facing the community. This redesign resulted in significant circulation and advertising growth, prompting the first successful sale of a national gay publication in the United States. The redesign and editorial were executed by editor-in-chief Andy Towle of Towleroad.com, creative director Randy Dunbar and Michael Davis.

In July 2003, Avalon Equity Partners announced its intention to buy Genre and fold the publication into its growing LGBT media holdings under the Window Media umbrella.

In March 2004, Window Media relaunched Genre with a new logo and a new format continuing to feature fashion, travel and lifestyle articles targeting affluent gay men with monthly profiles of men from across the United States, an idea that drew upon its parent company's national resources. Genre currently focuses on regional activities in cities where the sister companies' local newspapers are located.

The magazine suspended publication in 2009 due to the recession.
