= Andy Towle =

American journalist

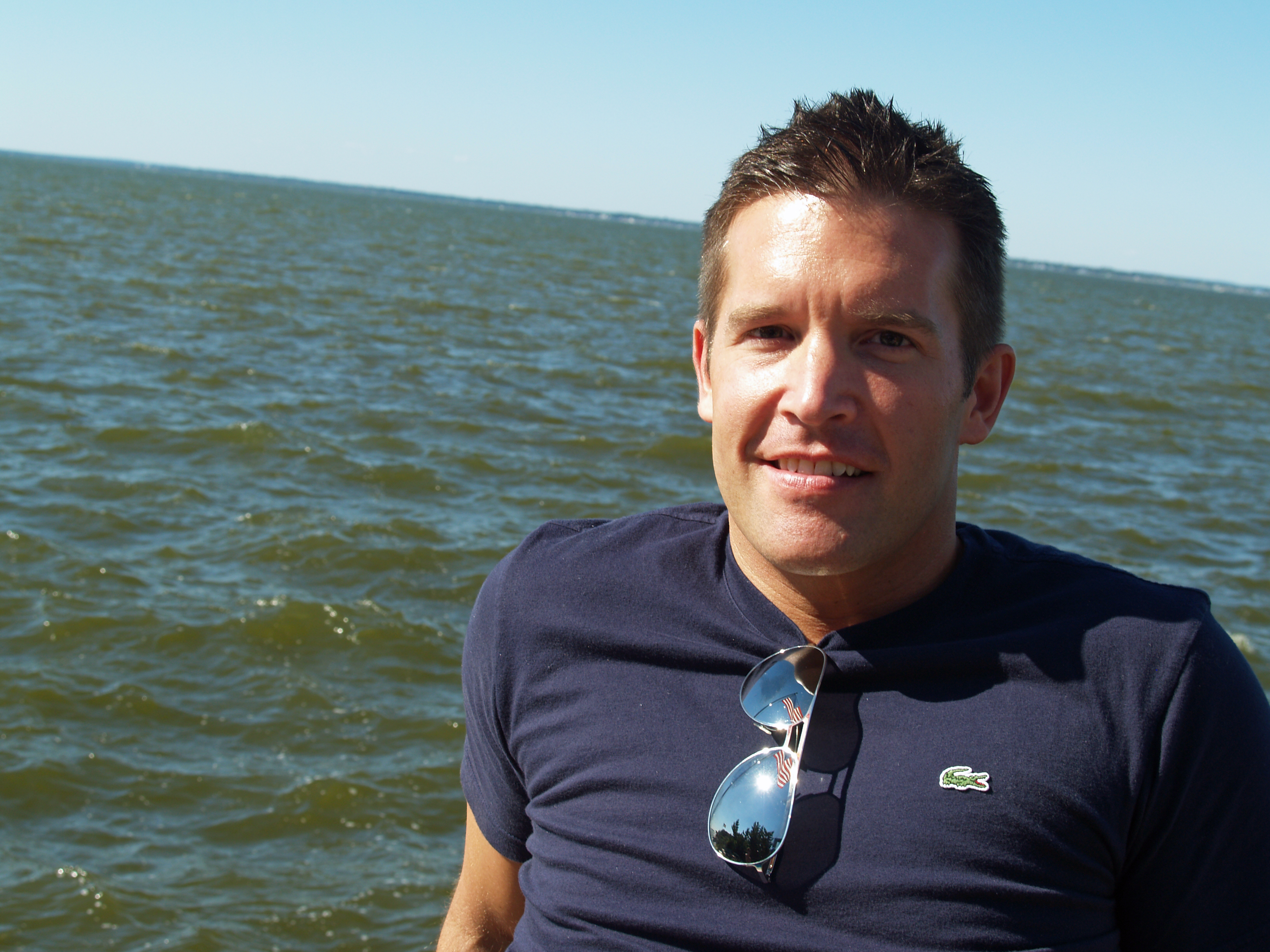
- Towle on the Great South Bay of Long Island
- Education: Vassar College (BA)
- Occupations: Artist; writer; publisher; media commentator
- Website: andytowle.com

Andy Towle /ˈtoʊl/ born in Illinois in 1967 is an American artist, poet and journalist based in Provincetown, Massachusetts. He has received several fellowships for his poetry and fiction, and his poetry has been published in journals including The Paris Review and Poetry magazine. He founded the LGBTQ news blog Towleroad and as of 2025 was working as a painter.

== Background ==
Towle was born in River Forest, Chicago, Illinois, in 1967. He attended Oak Park and River Forest High School, graduating in 1985. Towle holds two Bachelor of Arts degrees from Vassar College (1989) in art history and English.

== Career ==
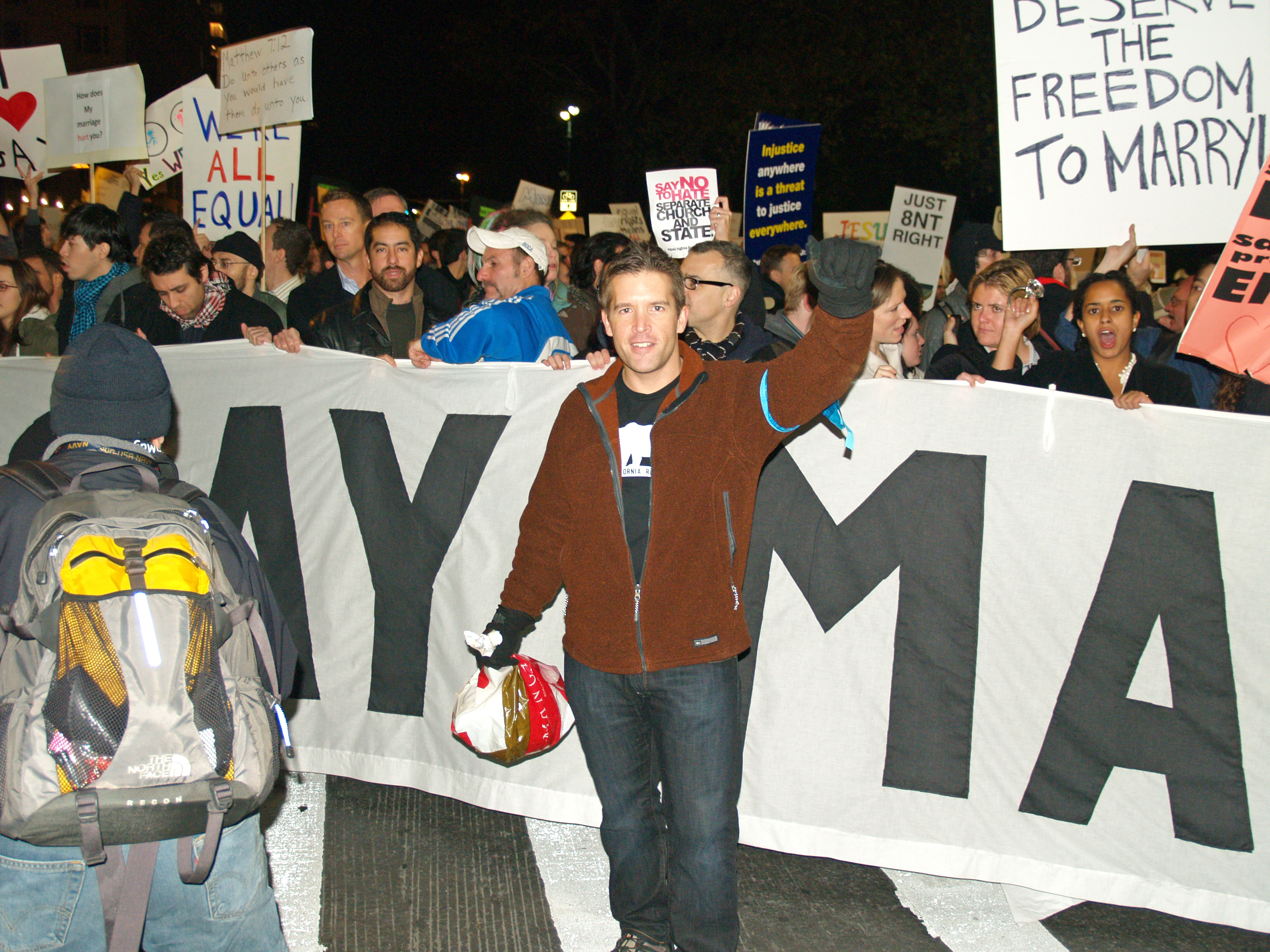
Towle was one of the organizers of a large New York City demonstration against California Proposition 8.

Upon graduating, Towle was awarded the 1989 W.K. Rose Fellowship in the Creative Arts from Vassar College. He also received a Wallace Stegner graduate fellowship from 1989 to 1991 from Stanford University, and two writing fellowships, one in poetry and one in fiction, from the Fine Arts Work Center in Provincetown, Massachusetts.

While in Provincetown he produced poetry, and worked as a pool boy and a bartender at The Boatslip resort. After moving to New York in 1992, he became a bartender and later a manager at the 1990s Manhattan gay bar Splash.

From 1998 to 2002, Towle served as the editor in chief of Genre magazine, and editor at large for The Out Traveler, an American gay travel quarterly.

Towle's poetry appeared in The Yale Review (May 1991), Ploughshares (Winter 1992–93), The Paris Review in 2000, and in Poetry Magazine (July 1988, November 1988, February 1991, May 1997, and July 1999).

Towle founded the website Towleroad in 2003 and left in 2021 to focus full time on a career in visual art.

In June 2024, Towle exhibited new paintings at Provincetown Commons in Provincetown, Massachusetts, alongside artists Trevor Mikula and Josh Wilmoth.

== See also ==
- LGBT culture in New York City
- List of LGBT people from New York City
- New Yorkers in journalism
- NYC Pride March
- Poetry analysis
