= Bay Windows =

American LGBT newspaper

- Type: Weekly LGBT newspaper
- Format: Tabloid
- Owner(s): Jeff Coakley and Sue O'Connell
- Founder: Sasha Alyson
- Publisher: Jeff Coakley and Sue O'Connell
- Editor-in-chief: Sue O'Connell
- Staff writers: Judah Leblang, Billy Masters, Richard J. Rosendall, Dana Rudolph, Rev. Irene Monroe, Scott Kearnan
- Founded: 1983
- Headquarters: Suite 204, 28 Damrell Street, Boston, Massachusetts
- OCLC number: 61124500
- Website: Baywindows.com
- Free online archives: http://www.baywindows.com/PDF

Bay Windows is an LGBT newspaper, published weekly on Thursdays and Fridays in Boston, Massachusetts, serving the entire New England region of the United States. The paper is a member of the New England Press Association and the National Gay Newspaper Guild.

== History ==
Bay Windows was created in 1983 by the founding publisher Sasha Alyson. Former longtime arts and entertainment editor Rudy Kikel has been credited with giving it its name. It began as a monthly free paper primarily distributed in preexisting gay and lesbian spaces like bars and businesses, and eventually moved to its weekly schedule. Alyson was a reader of the Gay Community News, and founded Bay Windows with an eye toward creating a gay and lesbian newspaper that covered more local news and provided more AIDS coverage along with general political coverage.

It was purchased in 1985 by James Hoover who was then publisher of the South End News. Editor Jeff Epperly was brought on, and the newspaper became more professional and traditionally journalistic. Hoover founded and became president of the National Gay Newspaper Guild at this time, making Bay Windows an early part of the organization.

Hoover sold both Bay Windows and the South End News to Jeff Coakley and Sue O'Connell in 2003. Susan Ryan-Vollmar was brought on as editor at this time. During this time Bay Windows' readership moved further into the suburbs, so the paper responded by moving its distribution into major supermarket chains and news boxes.

On October 31, 2006, EDGE Media Network published a press release announcing a partnership with Bay Windows. Sue O'Connell and Jeff Coakley began working with EDGE Media Network on marketing and sale promotions as part of Bay Windows new equity position at the Media Network.

In 2011, the paper acquired Golden Rainbow Times, a monthly newsletter oriented toward LGBT senior citizens. The publication became a monthly insert in Bay Windows.

== Content ==
The typical length of a weekly paper is between 20 and 44 pages with the exception of Gay Pride Week where the newspaper is 100 pages.

Bay Windows main audience is the LGBT community and includes content "from the AIDS crisis to Vermont civil unions and Massachusetts marriage battles" as well as local New England news relating to the LGBT community, national news, and popular culture.

== Circulation ==
Bay Windows is published weekly on Thursdays and Fridays and distributed to over 300 locations with a cost of 50 cents at a newsstand.

Like many other organizations, Bay Windows also was affected by the Great Recession; it cut its distribution to save on printing costs by around 12%. The paper also relocated to South Boston from its previous offices in the South End so it could pay less rent for its offices. Bay Windows' longtime rival The New England Blade did not survive the recession, leaving Bay Windows as Boston's sole gay newspaper. This enabled Bay Windows to expand its distribution from 2,000 to 20,000 and have an influx in new local advertisers that were previously partnered with the Blade. The increased distribution was also in part due to the availability of the paper in Shaw's, Stop & Shop, news bins, and local grocery stores.

According to the Bay Windows website, they only print as many physical copies as needed for environmental reasons and encourage readers to get in contact with them via email for details on distribution locations. There are PDFs of the paper accessible on their website dating back to April 4, 2019.

== Notable coverage ==
=== Mitt Romney ===
Bay Windows' coverage of former Massachusetts governor and two-time Republican presidential candidate Mitt Romney and his early support of the gay community garnered national attention. In his 2012 campaign, Romney made a point of being vocally opposed to gay marriage, but Bay Windows republished a series of articles the paper had conducted with him that showed his stance on the issue shifting over the years: these were used in headlines in mainstream news media across the country. The most-cited of these articles was a 1994 interview with then-Bay Windows reporter Christoper Muther in which he stated, "I would further the efforts Ted Kennedy has led," and "I think the gay community needs more support from the Republican Party and I would be a voice in the Republican Party to foster antidiscrimination efforts," when speaking about supporting the LGBT community.

=== Pope John Paul II ===
After the death of Pope John Paul II, the paper released an issue called The Holy Father's Homophobia, which received wide praise and honors from the New England Press Association.

=== True Colors OUT Youth Theatre controversy ===
In 2013 co-owner Sue O'Connell wrote an article titled "White gay men and black men have more in common than they think" where she suggested "that an image problem (for young black men) is an element of the racial profiling young black men experience" and posed the hypothetical question of "what would happen if young black men took a page from Frank Kameny's (a white gay man) playbook?". The article generated a strong reaction by the local LGBT and black communities as it appeared to use respectability politics as a potential solution to the marginalization and profiling of black men. In response to this article the True Colors: OUT Youth Theater, which is a part of the larger The Theatre Offensive group in Boston, wrote, produced and performed a show titled "Voices from the Ground, Stories from the Roots" in 2014.

"After the Bay Windows editorial sparked such strong local reaction among Boston's LGBT and black communities, we wanted to take on the topic by exploring the roots of sexuality, culture, religion, gender and more. The result is a moving, personal and revealing show that couples historical information and current events with the personal, honest experiences of True Colors members. It truly demonstrates the complex dynamics of one's roots and history and their effect on the person they become," said Nick Bazo, the Director of True Colors about the show.
