= Jeffrey P. Weaver =

American political strategist (born 1966)

Jeff Weaver
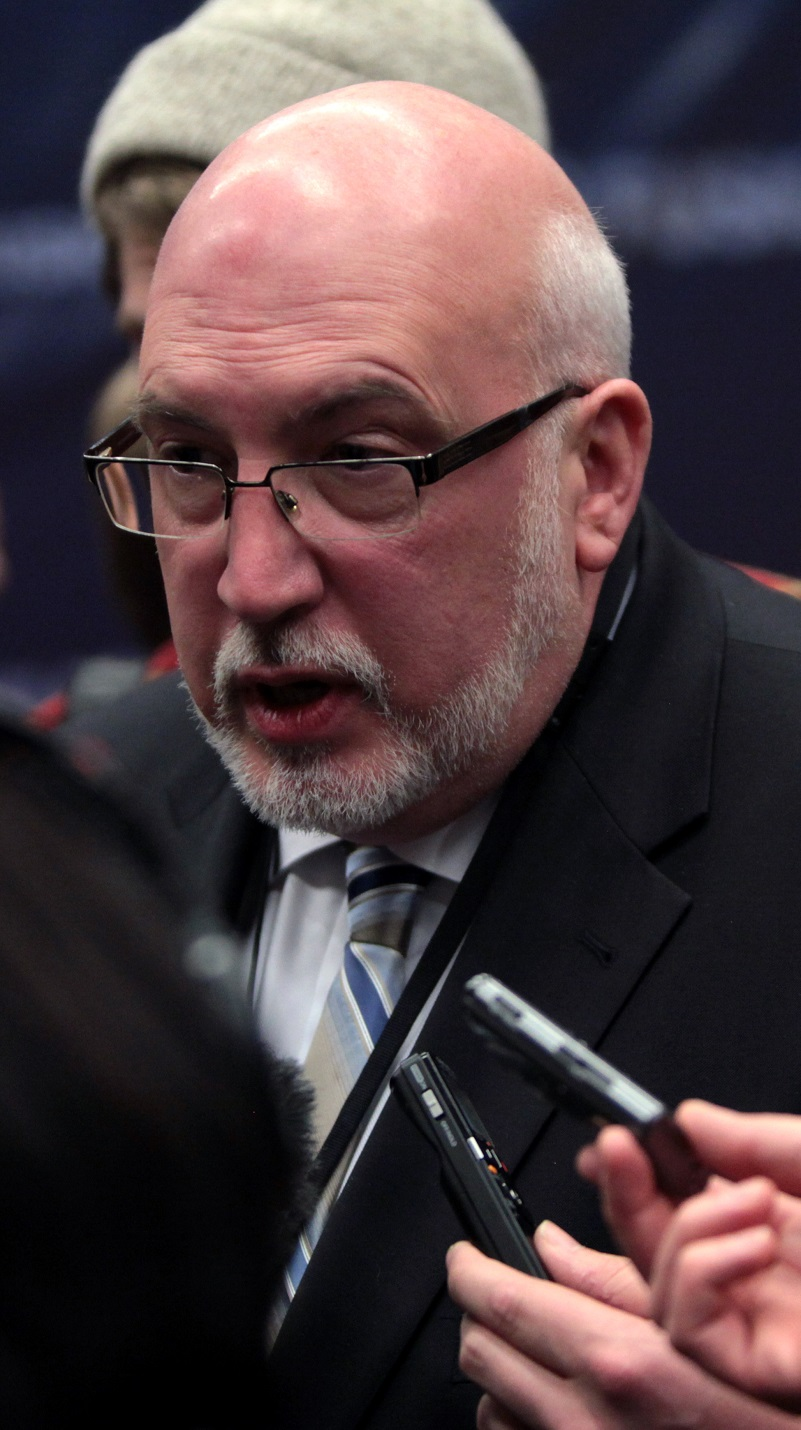
- Born: 1966 (age 59–60); St. Albans, Vermont, U.S.
- Education: University of Vermont (BA); Georgetown University (JD)

Jeffrey P. Weaver (born 1966) is an American political strategist who served as campaign manager for the Bernie Sanders 2016 presidential campaign and an advisor for the Bernie Sanders 2020 presidential campaign. He formerly served as the campaign manager for Bernie Sanders's 2006 United States Senate election and as chief of staff in Sanders's House and Senate offices. In August 2016, Weaver was named president of Our Revolution, a political organization created by Sanders, a position he held until June 2017. In May 2018, his book How Bernie Won: Inside the Revolution That's Taking Back Our Country was published. He served as a senior advisor for Dean Phillips 2024 presidential campaign.

== Education ==
Weaver graduated from Missisquoi Valley Union High School in Swanton, Vermont in 1983. He then attended Boston University as an undergraduate ROTC candidate.

After being suspended, Weaver left Boston University and later graduated from the University of Vermont. He then earned a Juris Doctor from the Georgetown University Law Center.

=== Anti-apartheid activism ===
At Boston University, Weaver was arrested on April 24, 1986, for disorderly conduct, along with 10 other students, who became known as the "BU Eleven." The group began building shanties on campus and tried to prevent university employees from tearing them down. During the incident, several students, including Weaver, tried to prevent police from driving away. Some of the students were placed on probation and others suspended. Weaver received an honorable discharge from the Marines' Reserve Officers' Training Corps. Also in 1986, Weaver and three other students sued the university for the right to hang banners outside their dormitories. Yosef Abramowitz and two other students had displayed signs promoting divestment of the university with companies doing business with South Africa. When Abramowitz's sign was taken down, Weaver hung an American flag and two signs, one a Marine recruiting poster and the other reading "In Solidarity With Yosef". The university claimed it had a policy against dormitory banner displays, but the students argued it was selectively enforced, violating the right to free speech. The courts ruled in the students' favor, providing an immediate injunction against the students being forced to leave their dormitories, and also issuing a permanent injunction preventing the university from taking disciplinary action against the four for exercising their right of free speech.

== Career ==
Weaver's first role as a campaign staffer was in 1986 when he worked for Bernie Sanders's gubernatorial campaign as an Independent. Weaver served as a driver for Sanders.

In 1987, one year after his involvement with the Sanders gubernatorial campaign, Weaver launched a campaign of his own, running for St. Albans City Ward 4 alderman. He was 21 years old and known locally for his efforts to register new voters. In 1990, Weaver challenged incumbent St. Albans mayor Ron Firkey for his seat. Weaver ran as an Independent and lost with 40% of the vote. In conceding the race, he said, "People haven't seen the last of Jeff Weaver."

Weaver was a staffer for Sanders' successful 1990 congressional race. Following the race, he worked as a legislative assistant, eventually working his way up to chief of staff. Weaver later managed Sanders' successful 2006 Senate campaign and served as chief of staff.

In 2009, following his role as Sanders' Senate chief of staff, Weaver left the political scene to run a comics and gaming store, Victory Comics, in Falls Church, Virginia.

In May 2015, after a break from politics, Weaver was appointed campaign manager for Sanders' presidential campaign. The New York Times described Weaver as "a long-trusted adviser to Mr. Sanders, who has developed a reputation inside and outside his campaign as a hard-charging operative often willing to go further than the candidate himself." In July 2016, after Sanders endorsed Hillary Clinton for president, Weaver promised "to help organize voters", but did not join her campaign staff.

In August 2016, Weaver was named the president of Our Revolution, a political organization created by Bernie Sanders. In response to his appointment, eight of Our Revolution's 13 staff members resigned. In late June 2017, he was succeeded by Nina Turner, former state senator of Ohio.

In May 2018, Weaver's book How Bernie Won: Inside the Revolution That's Taking Back Our Country--and Where We Go from Here was published. It is an account of the 2016 Sanders campaign and a wide-ranging assessment of its effects. During the promotional tour for the book, Weaver was interviewed on C-SPAN, Fox News and The Young Turks.

In November 2023, Minnesota Congressman Dean Phillips picked Weaver as senior advisor for his Democratic presidential primary campaign.
