= Talmage Boston =

American attorney and historian

- Born: October 1, 1953 (age 72); San Antonio, Texas
- Education: Juris Doctor; University of Texas at Austin
- Known for: Shackelford, McKinley & Norton, LLP (Partner)
- Spouse: Claire Lindsey Boston (married 1984–present)
- Children: 2
- Website: talmageboston.com

Talmage Boston (born October 1, 1953) is an American attorney, presidential and baseball historian, author and speaker.

== Selected publications ==
Talmage has authored five books related to baseball, legal and presidential history.

- Boston, Talmage (2005). 1939: Baseball's Tipping Point. Bright Sky Press. ISBN 9781931721530.
- Boston, Talmage (2009). Baseball and the Baby Boomer; A History, Commentary, and Memoir. Bright Sky Press. ISBN 9781933979267.
- Boston, Talmage (2012). Raising the Bar: The Crucial Role of the Lawyer in Society. State Bar of Texas. ISBN 9781892542847.
- Boston, Talmage (2016). Cross-Examining History: A Lawyer Gets Answers From the Experts About Our Presidents. Bright Sky Press. ISBN 9781942945208.
- Boston, Talmage (2024). How the Best Did It: Leadership Lessons From Our Top Presidents. Post Hill Press.
