= Reduction of capital =

Reduction of capital or capital reduction is to decrease stock of a company. During reduction of capital, sometimes the company returns a portion of the stock of a company to shareholder. A private company can reduce its capital in many different ways.

New and simpler procedures for the reduction of capital were introduced in the United Kingdom by the Companies Act 2006. Before these provisions came in, a court order was required to reduce share capital.

== See also ==
- Capital impairment
- Capital increase (de:Kapitalerhöhung)
- Dividend
