= Out South Florida =

Weekly tabloid newspaper based in South Florida

- Type: Alternative weekly
- Format: Tabloid
- Founded: 2023
- Headquarters: Wilton Manors, Florida, United States
- Circulation: 10,000
- Website: outsfl.com

Out South Florida is a South Florida-based LGBTQ alternative weekly newspaper founded in 2023. It was created as a revival for an LGBTQ news source in South Florida after the shutdown of South Florida Gay News.

== History ==
South Florida Gay News was founded in 2009 by Norm Kent. In May 2023, the newspaper announced it would be shutting down following Kent's death. Former staff members launched Out South Florida in June 2023 to fill the gap that the closing of South Florida Gay News left.

On June 2nd 2023, Out South Florida released their first news article, which was a "DeSantis Watch", providing updates on political statements and actions taken by Florida Governor Ron DeSantis, during the 2024 election primaries.
