= Southern Voice (newspaper) =

American LGBT newspaper

- Front page for October 20–26, 1994
- Owner: DRT Media Group
- Founder: Christina Cash
- Founded: 1988
- Ceased publication: December 2, 2010
- Relaunched: April 16, 2010
- Language: English
- Headquarters: Atlanta, Georgia
- OCLC number: 30371411

Southern Voice (commonly known as SoVo) was a lesbian, gay, bisexual and transgender newspaper in Atlanta and the Southeast United States.

== History ==
It was founded by Atlanta native Christina Cash as an independent publication in 1988. It published until August 1997 and was then purchased by Window Media, who also bought rights to the name. Window bought and then published several gay-oriented newspapers in the United States. It focused mainly on global and regional political issues concerning LGBT persons. Southern Voice was a member of the National Gay Newspaper Guild.

Southern Voice claimed over 100,000 readers, the most widely read LGBT paper in the region.

On November 16, 2009, Southern Voice and several related publications, including the Washington Blade, were shut down as Window Media closed up shop.

The US Bankruptcy Court in Atlanta auctioned the assets of Southern Voice in February 2010. The rights to the names, trademarks, and archives of Southern Voice and David Atlanta magazine were sold to Matt Neumann, publisher of Gaydar magazine for $9.000. Southern Voice was revived on April 16, 2010, though with an erratic printing schedule and complaints about quality control. David Atlanta magazine reappeared on March 10.

The paper ceased publishing after the December 2, 2010, issue. David Atlanta and Southern Voice were sold in August 2011 to David Thompson. According to DRT Media Group, Southern Voice is not being considered for re-launch in the foreseeable future. David Atlanta transitioned into Peach Atlanta and is published weekly.

Christina Cash, founder of SoVo, launched GA Voice in March, 2010. Her attempt to buy the name "Southern Voice" was unsuccessful in bankruptcy court. She launched the newspaper with partners Laura Douglas-Brown and Tim Boyd. Several SoVo staff members joined the Georgia Voice staff. Georgia Voice, which is now owned by Rough Draft Atlanta, is published monthly in print, with a weekly email newsletter.

Early issues of Southern Voice dating from 1988 to 1995 are available online through the Digital Library of Georgia.

== Financial woes ==
Avalon Equity Fund, an investment fund that owns several gay media outlets including Washington Blade, South Florida Blade, 411 magazine, David Atlanta, Southern Voice (SoVo) and Genre magazine was found to be in a condition the Small Business Administration (SBA) refers to as "capital impairment". This means that Avalon did not maintain the necessary outside investments required under the terms of loans borrowed from the SBA totaling US$38 million. A lawsuit filed by SBA revealed that Avalon had little or no outside capital left due to divestiture by investors, losses in revenue or asset values or a combination of the three. Avalon Equity Fund is in receivership with SBA, which will allow SBA to sell off its assets to satisfy the loans.

In November 2009, the paper was shut down because of the financial status of its parent company, Window Media and its majority stockholder, Avalon Equity Fund.
