= Sue O'Connell =

Boston Journalist and Publisher

- Born: November 13, 1961 (age 65)
- Education: Emerson College
- Known for: Co-publisher of Bay Windows

Sue O'Connell is an American publisher and media commentator based in Boston.

== Early life and education ==
O'Connell grew up in Revere, Massachusetts to working class parents. She graduated from Emerson College in Boston in 1985.

== Career ==
O'Connell has served on the national board of governors for the Human Rights Campaign and volunteered at the Boston AIDS Action Committee and the Fenway Health Community Health Center.

O'Connell was involved with Bay Windows since 1998, and was a co-publisher from 2003 until 2021. She has been a co-owner of The EDGE Media Network, a national network of LGBTQ news web portal.

From 2016–2019 she hosted The Take With Sue O'Connell on NECN. Since 2023 she has co-hosted @Issue, a weekly program on NBC10 Boston with anchor Cory Smith.

== Awards and honors ==
- Gay Power Player (2006), Boston Magazine
- Top New England LGBT Power Player (2015), Boston Spirit Magazine
- Best TV News Host, for The Take With Sue O'Connell, in Boston Magazine's Best of Boston awards

== Personal life ==
O'Connell is a lesbian and a single mother to a daughter, whom she homeschooled for a number of years. She has lived in the Boston area for her entire life, with the exception of a six-month period.
