= Kat Long =

American journalist (born 1974)

- Born: December 31, 1974 (age 50); Silver Spring, Maryland, U.S.
- Occupation: Journalist; author; social historian
- Education: Sarah Lawrence College (BA); CUNY Graduate School of Journalism (MA)

Kathryn Noel Long (born December 31, 1974) is an American journalist, author, and social historian.

== Biography ==
Long was born in Silver Spring, Maryland, December 31, 1974. She attended Sarah Lawrence College from 1993 to 1997, where she was a recipient of the Nancy Lynn Schwartz Fiction Award; she graduated with a BA in creative writing in 1997. She completed an MA in journalism at the CUNY Graduate School of Journalism, as a recipient of the Punch Sulzberger Scholarship.

She is the author of The Forbidden Apple: A Century of Sex & Sin in New York City which was released in February 2009 by Ig Publishing. The book was reviewed in The Village Voice and The New York Press On April 5, 2009, the book was reviewed in the New York Times as an Editors' Pick. Kat was the editor-in-chief of the New York Blade, the only gay-owned and operated newspaper in New York City, prior to shutting down operations in June 2009.

She is a staff editor at Mental Floss, the former executive editor of GO Magazine and has contributed numerous articles to The New York Times, The Washington Post, The Wall Street Journal, Smithsonian, Slate, Scientific American, The Village Voice, The Advocate, Playgirl and other publications. She was editor-in-chief of the best-selling annual guidebook Sexy Miami 2003-2004 and co-wrote two editions of Sexy New York City. She also contributed entries to the forthcoming Encyclopedia of Gay Folklife, to be published by M.E. Sharpe.

She currently resides in New York, New York.
