= Kate Long (storyteller) =

American songwriter and storyteller

Kate Long is an American writer, journalist and songwriter. Her songs been recorded by dozens of artists and won national awards, including the International Bluegrass Music Association Song of the Year. She was the writing coach for The Charleston Gazette for 33 years and produced for West Virginia Public Broadcasting. She hosted and produced the national award-winning In Their Own Country public radio series. She founded Try This West Virginia and Voices of West Virginia and co-founded the Good News Mountaineer Garage.

== Awards ==
- 2004 Gerald Loeb Award for "Everybody at Risk"
- 2008 International Bluegrass Music Association Song of the Year
