= Capital impairment =

Corporate law: reduction of capital below legal minimum

Capital impairment is the case when the company lost its asset, so the asset is lower than the stock of a company. One way to avoid capital impairment is reduction of capital without any compensation. Impaired capital may occur when a company incurs losses that result in negative retained earnings, also referred to as a retained deficit. Retained earnings can be reduced by dividend distributions; therefore, excessive dividend payments may contribute to a negative balance. In some jurisdictions, incorporation laws restrict companies from issuing dividends until any retained earnings deficit is resolved.

== See also ==
- Bankruptcy
- Reduction of capital
