= National Gay Newspaper Guild =

Organisation of LGBT newspapers in the USA

The National Gay Newspaper Guild is an organization of LGBT newspapers located in the United States.

Through Rivendell Media, the guild gathers statistics on the readership of the member publications.

== Member publications ==
- Bay Area Reporter
- Bay Windows
- Between the Lines
- Dallas Voice
- Frontiers
- Philadelphia Gay News
- San Francisco Sentinel
- Washington Blade
- Windy City Times
