= Washington Blade =

American LGBT newspaper

- Type: Weekly LGBTQ newspaper
- Format: Tabloid
- Publisher: Lynne Brown
- Editor: Kevin Naff
- Founded: 1969; 57 years ago
- Headquarters: Washington, D.C., United States
- Circulation: 20,326 (as of 2019)
- ISSN: 0278-9892
- Website: washingtonblade.com

The Washington Blade is an LGBTQ newspaper in the Washington metropolitan area. The Blade is the oldest LGBTQ newspaper in the United States and third largest by circulation, behind the Philadelphia Gay News and the Gay City News of New York City. The Blade is often referred to as America's gay newspaper of record because it chronicled LGBTQ news locally, nationally, and internationally. The New York Times said the Blade is considered "one of the most influential publications written for a gay audience."

The paper was originally launched as an independent publication in October 1969 with a focus on bringing the community together. In 2001, the Blade was purchased by Window Media LLC, a group of gay-oriented newspapers circulated throughout the United States with a staff composed of professional journalists, becoming a leading source of news for the readers both in Washington and around the nation. The paper publishes weekly on Fridays and celebrated its 50th anniversary in October 2019.

In November 2009, the Blade and several related publications, including the Southern Voice, were shut down after Window Media announced it was closing business. After Blade staff members were told they no longer had jobs, plans were made for a new gay publication entitled DC Agenda, since the trademark for Washington Blade was still held by the now-defunct Window Media.

It was announced on April 27, 2010, that the DC Agenda would rename itself to the Washington Blade. The ownership group of the Agenda consisted of many former staff members of the Blade, who purchased the trademark and paper archives out of bankruptcy court. The first issue of the newly independent Blade debuted on April 30, 2010.

== History ==
The premier October 1969 issue of the "Gay Blade" consisted of one single-sided page.

=== Origins to 1973 ===
The Washington Blade, originally called The Gay Blade, published its first issue on October 5, 1969. Taking its roots from the Mattachine Society of Washington's newsletter in the late 1950s and early 1960s, the Blade was conceived as a way to fill in a perceived gap in the organization of social communications within the gay community of Washington, D.C. It was created by Nancy Tucker and Lilli Vincenz. The Blade was originally published as a single page and distributed hand-to-hand in a variety of gay bars throughout the city. Afraid of a backlash over the publication, many of the initial authors of writings in the Blade used pen names during the early years of publishing.

The initial publications were entirely created by volunteers from the community with two editors, Nancy Tucker and Bart Wenger, at the helm. Wenger stated the initial goals of the publication were to "...engender a sense of community" and that it was "very important for gays to become acquainted with one another." Published monthly from 1969 to 1973, the newspaper evolved from its original size and shape of a single letter sized paper sheet. In June 1972, the Gay Blade published its first multi-page edition which consisted of four pages and in April 1973, the paper expanded to eight pages and was printed on legal sized paper sheets, stapled in the middle and folded. As the looks of the paper evolved, so did the news coverage. The Gay Blade began to focus less on being a newsletter used to organize the community and more of a newspaper for the community.

Collage of historical covers of the Washington Blade showing the evolution of the size, format, and publication name from its early years to the present. (Note: From bottom to top: the December 1977 cover of The Blade, the April 1973 cover of The Gay Blade, the cover of the 1993 March on Washington Special Edition of the Washington Blade, the April 23, 1993 cover of the Washington Blade, the June 27, 2003 cover of the Washington Blade, and the September 1974 cover of The Gay Blade.)

=== 1974 to 1982 ===
In July 1974, the first newsprint edition was published and signaled an evolution in the history of the Gay Blade. A fifth anniversary edition of the paper was not published in October 1974 because of a lack of revenue and interest, marking the only time the paper failed to publish an edition in its history. The new focus on being a newspaper allowed the publication's circulation to grow in 1974 and 1975 from five hundred copies distributed at less than a dozen sites to over 4,000 copies available at thirty-five locations throughout the city. The June 1975 edition of the Blade dropped the word 'Gay' from the title of the publication after it was discovered that a newspaper in New York City held the rights to the name Gay Blade. The new name of the publication was now The Blade. It continued to be published on newsprint paper and had no additional format changes until near the end of the decade. Incorporating as a non-profit corporation under the title of "Blade Communications, Inc." in November 1975, the paper continued its growth.

Don Michaels, an important voice on the pages of the publication, was named the editor of the paper in January 1978. Michaels began strict enforcement of a policy that prohibited pen names from being used in bylines. By November 1978, the Blade was regularly featuring color printing on its pages and beginning in 1979, the Blade changed into a bi-weekly publication. Starting in October 1980, the name of the publication changed to The Washington Blade and the corporation re-incorporated as a for-profit, employee-owned business. In July 1981, the Blade ran a front-page story entitled "Rare, Fatal Pneumonia Hits Gay Men," making the paper one of the first gay newspapers in the country to write about the disease that has come to be known as AIDS. In November 1981, Don Michaels got promoted to the position of publisher, a position he would hold for over two decades.

=== 1983 to 2000 ===
The Blade started publishing weekly in January 1983 and coverage shifted to the AIDS crisis and news about this newly emerging disease. The ever-breaking news caused the paper to remain in a heightened state of coverage and nearly exhausted the papers resources with members of the community having to step in to support the work of the Blade. The reporting of the AIDS crisis from this timeframe allowed the newspaper to come of age to the mature and professionally driven publication seen today. In June 1988, the editors of the paper used a computer to layout the paper for the first time.

The 1990s saw increases in readership and circulation of the Washington Blade. In April 1993, during the 1993 Gay March on Washington, the paper published its largest edition to date consisting of 216 pages. The paper expanded into new markets and mediums with the 1995 launch of the online version of the Blade, followed two years later with the launching of a sister publication in New York, called the New York Blade. In the later part of the century, coverage was expanded to include local and national news, as well as international news of interest to the LGBTQ community. Some authors implemented the use of humor in addressing potentially sensitive subjects, such as N. Leigh Dunlap in her long-running comic strip Morgan Calabrese.

=== 2001 to 2024 ===
On May 25, 2001, the print edition announced the sale of the Washington Blade to Window Media, LLC, a group of gay publications. With the new ownership came several changes to standardize the paper with other Window Media publications, such as the return of editorials to the publication after being missing for several decades. Shortly after the sale of the paper, staff at the Blade sought a vote to unionize with the help of the Washington-Baltimore Newspaper Guild. The Guild and the staff of the Blade brought a complaint to the National Labor Relations Board and deliberated for a few weeks over this issue resulting in a ten to eight vote against unionization on July 20, 2001.

Beginning in 2005, the Washington Blade also ran a free news clipping service called the BladeWire. This service collected news stories of interest to the LGBTQ community from a variety of local, state, regional, national, and selected international media sources. The service was generated by the Blades editors and was published on the internet. A feature of the BladeWire also allowed it to be syndicated onto other websites using JavaScript.

During the 2008 U.S. presidential election, Senator John McCain's decision to participate in a written interview with the Blade marked the first time a Republican presidential nominee agreed to be interviewed by a gay publication.

On November 16, 2009, the paper was abruptly shut down because of the financial status of its parent company, Window Media, and its majority shareholder, Avalon Equity Partners. Employees at the Blade were aware of Window Media's financial troubles, but the timing and total closure of the publication came as a shock to the entire staff. Kevin Naff, editor of the Blade, said employees "found out when two of the corporate officers were waiting for us when we got to work this morning". Since the Blade had been a profitable newspaper, and because the debt-ridden Window Media was no longer draining the publication's finances, the same day the Blade shut down, Naff told the Washington City Paper he and the remaining staffers "We're all together. Our first meeting for our new venture is tomorrow morning." Delegate Eleanor Holmes Norton said the Blade had been a "weekly must-read", and pledged support for a new publication to serve Washington's LGBT community.

On November 20, 2009, a new venture, supported entirely by volunteering staff (who consisted of the majority of the Blade's editorial staff, as well as a few others, at the time of its closing), launched with its first issue. Called DC Agenda, no relation to the non-profit organization of the same name, the new venture released the same week as the closing of the Blade. From the placeholder website SaveTheBlade.com:

While we cannot save the name we can certainly save all that was the essence and spirit of our LGBTQ Community's newspaper of record. The staff of the paper remains united and our mission to enlighten and inform remains steadfast. We will launch a new publication that will bring you what we have always worked to deliver - gay news and information that is critical to our Metro DC LGBTQ Community.

Issues were handed out at Washington, D.C., Metro train stations, and an online copy was available at www.washingtonblade.com.

On February 25, 2010, DC Agenda acquired the assets of the Washington Blade from the US Bankruptcy Court. Included were the archives, name, trademarks, website, and fixtures from the Washington Blade offices. About a month later on April 26, 2010, the DC Agenda publisher announced that the Washington Blade name would return to the masthead of the paper with the DC Agenda becoming the name of the arts and entertainment section.

On March 24, 2017, the paper launched a version in Los Angeles, called the Los Angeles Blade.

On September 12, 2024, the Washington Blade became the first LGBTQ newspaper to be given an exclusive interview with a sitting U.S. president. Reporter Christopher Kane sat down with President Joe Biden in the Oval Office and discussed a wide range of topics.

== Circulation and demographics ==
The Washington Blade was published weekly on Fridays with a circulation of 33,874 printed copies of each edition. News coverage focuses mainly on global and regional political issues concerning LGBT persons with additional coverage of entertainment and nightlife in the Washington, D.C. area. The masthead of the printed paper includes the slogan "The gay and lesbian weekly of the national capital area since 1969" and the online masthead proclaims "All the news for your life. And your style." Distribution of the Blade includes locations throughout the Washington, D.C. area. Additional distribution points are located in Maryland, Virginia, and as far away as Rehoboth Beach, Delaware. The newspaper is primarily distributed through free-standing newspaper boxes on street corners, newspaper racks at Metro stations, and in shops and restaurants. The main competition to the Washington Blade in Washington, D.C. is the weekly newsmagazine, Metro Weekly, and nationally the Bay Area Reporter of San Francisco. For a brief period starting in 1979, the Blade also had competition from Blacklight, the city's first African-American gay monthly periodical. Archives of the Washington Blade were maintained at their Washington, D.C. offices and on Microfilm at the Microfilm Reading Room of the Library of Congress, and in the Alternative & Underground Press Collections of ProQuest (formerly called UMI) in Ann Arbor, Michigan. The newspaper is a member of the National Newspaper Association, the National Gay Newspaper Guild, and the Associated Press.

According to a survey conducted by Simmons Market Research in April 2000 for the Washington Blade, the median age of their readership was forty-one and 85% of their readers were between the ages of twenty-five and fifty-four years old. 92% of the readership is employed with 70% of the readers in professional and managerial jobs. The median income of readers was $57,200 per year, with median household income at $84,000. Overall, 79% of the Blade's readership holds a college degree with 42% of the readers holding postgraduate degrees.

== Awards ==
A series of articles from March 1985 and continuing for five months entitled "When Pretending Stops," written by Lisa Keen, won local acclaim and awards for the coverage of the slow death of local lawyer Ray Engebretsen. This series of articles chronicled the impact of AIDS in the gay community and was ground-breaking coverage in Washington. In 1995, the Washington Blade won a Silver Gavel award from the American Bar Association for a four-part series of articles entitled "Legal Challenges to Anti-Gay Initiatives" which explored the legal consequences of anti-gay ballot initiatives and the constitutional challenges to them. In 2007, the paper won four Dateline Awards for Excellence in Local Journalism from the Society of Professional Journalists Washington, D.C., Pro Chapter.

== Criticism and controversy ==
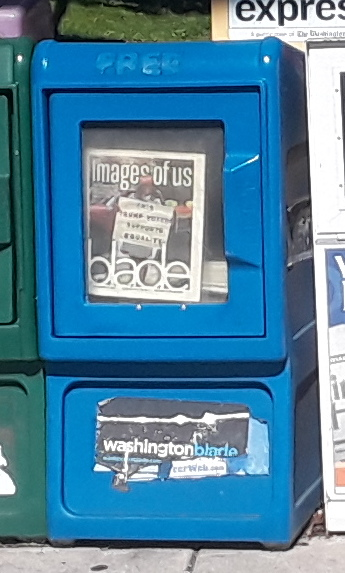
Washington Blade dispenser at Huntington metro station

Publication of the paper has not been without controversy over the years. The news coverage from the early years to the mid-1980s was perceived by some as being "white-washed" for its lack of coverage of the gay African American population located in Washington, D.C., a city where more than 70 percent of its residents were African-American. This led to the creation of the short-lived publication Blacklight, the city's first African-American gay monthly periodical in August 1979, which attempted to compete with the Blade.

Coverage of the City Council special election in April 1991 garnered intensive criticism of biased coverage and led to calls for reforming the paper's editorial board. In 1993, the Blade and its publishing company threatened to sue the Fairfax County Library over a potential ban on the distribution of the Blade at its branches. Also, the 2001 sale of the Washington Blade to Window Media, LLC led to intense criticism from former employees, editors, and media pundits of the consolidation of so many gay newspapers' editorial boards into the same company, leading to fears of homogenizing of content and editorial control. A former staff writer has also accused the paper of playing politics through the mandated use of the capitalized version of the word 'Gay' in order to make a political statement.

The newspaper has been accused from time-to-time of forcing public figures out of the closet. This policy of 'outing' individuals surfaced in 1996 during the debate over the Defense of Marriage Act, when the Blade and The Advocate were going to out Congressmen Jim Kolbe and Mark Foley. Neither publication did out either politician, and both publications later denied ever intending to out the Congressmen.

In later years, these accusations have resurfaced as Kevin Naff, current editor of the Blade, has accused The Washington Post of 'straight-washing' stories about LGBTQ individuals. Naff wrote that "When someone is described as 'flamboyant,' 'eccentric' or 'a lifelong bachelor,' we know what's being implied... Readers of the Washington Post had better hone their gaydar skills, because in story after story, the newsgathering behemoth either ignores questions of sexual orientation or employs endless winks and nods to convey what would be better spelled out." When asked why identifying and outing of individuals by publications like the Blade, staff writer Greg Marzullo wrote "Why do [we] insist on mentioning someone's sexual orientation at all? Because we're a queer paper."

As reported in the Washington Post, former editor Chris Crain summarized the Blade's editorial reasoning for the 'outings' by stating that "It is 2004, not 1954, and sexual orientation in and of itself is no longer a 'private fact' beyond the pale of inquiry." The Blade, he wrote, "would investigate and report about whether influential Hill aides are gay if facts about their sexual orientation raise highly newsworthy questions of hypocrisy in the stands taken by anti-gay members of Congress for whom they work." A former staff writer of the Washington Blade has noted objections to this perceived campaign to label individuals by their sexual orientations and has used a blog to register these objections.

In July 2005, Jeff Gannon began writing editorials for the paper. His pieces included criticism of gay blogger John Aravosis, who had helped uncover Gannon's pornographic ads. Editor Chris Crain attracted his own criticism from many in the gay community for this decision, due to Gannon's history of anti-gay reporting as well as Gannon's refusal to disclose his sexual orientation. He has said, "My personal life is a private matter, despite the fact that I have become a public person." Crain defended his decision in a September 2005 editorial and claimed the "steady stream of feedback/vitriol" had declined "a little" with each new Gannon article.

== See also ==
- Los Angeles Blade
- The New York Blade
