= Window Media =

Window Media LLC was a gay press publishing holding company that acquired and operated gay and lesbian newspapers and magazines in the 2000s. In 2009 it ceased operations following bankruptcy.

== Former publications ==
=== Newspapers ===
- South Florida Blade
- Southern Voice
- Washington Blade
- Houston Voice (first published as the Montrose Star)

=== Magazines ===
- David Atlanta
- Eclipse
- 411 Magazine
- Genre

== Financial history ==
On November 16, 2009, all publications under the holding company were closed.

David Atlanta and Washington Blade have since returned under new ownership.
