= Suara Kita =

Indonesian LGBTQ+ organization

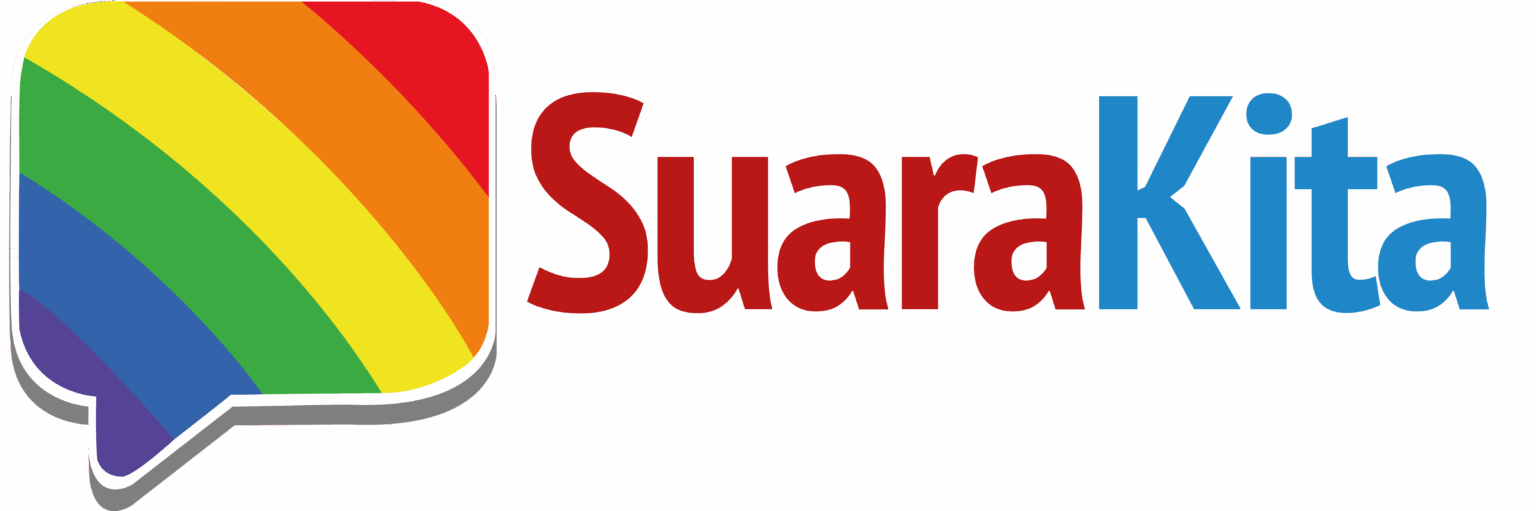
- Founder: Hartoyo
- Type: LGBTQ+ organization
- Location: Jakarta
- Region served: Indonesia
- Website: https://suarakita.org/

Perkumpulan Suara Kita or Suara Kita (English: Our Voice) is an Indonesian LGBTQ+ organization in Jakarta. It provides advocacy and community support such as food and identity card assistance. The organization was conceptualized by the founder Hartoyo in 2007, later launching in 2009 and gaining legal recognition in 2013. The organization fundraises through the boutique Sri Kendes as well as selling preowned clothes through Sri Loved. The group has experienced censorship from Indonesia's Ministry of Information.

== Advocacy ==
On February 10, 2016, Suara Kita chairman Hartoyo wrote an open letter to then President Joko Widodo admist the rise of queerphobic rhetoric in the country. The letter advocated for protecting LGBTQ+ people's freedom and self-expression, surveilling for violence against LGBTQ+ people, and increasing public awareness and education about LGBTQ+ people. Suara Kita participated alongside other organizations in creating a joint universal periodic review report in 2017. The organization also posts LGBTQ+ short stories to their website. On July 1, 2017, Suara Kita activist Teguh Afandi participated in round table of young Indonesians with former US President Barack Obama to discuss how positive changes are being made in the community.

The director of State University of Gorontalo Symasu Qamar Badu issued a policy monitoring for LGBTQ+ students and potentially punishing them through consequences like revoking scholarships if the student refused to stop identifying as LGBTQ+. In response, Hartoyo stated, "UNG must guarantee non-discriminatory education for people of whatever sexual orientation." He also called for Badu to cancel his plan of having a team set out to "normalize" LGBTQ+ students.

== Fundraising and grants ==
In 2016, Suatra Kita created Sri Kendi, a boutique selling clothes made of traditional fabrics. Sales are made through Facebook, craft exhibitions, and at bazaars. The venture earned 50 to 60 million Indonesian rupiah (RP)/3,400 to US$4,080 per month prior to the COVID-19 lockdown. These funds were used to make up for the difficulty obtaining donors due to government restrictions on foreign donations to LGBTQ+ organizations. During the COVID-19 pandemic, Suara Kita started Sri Loved, a fundraising initiative by selling used clothes on Facebook live. The funds are used to help transgender women get ID cards, education efforts, and to provide food assistance to the LGBT community and residents of the Bindara Cina flat. A small portion of funds are used to cover operational expenses as well.

Suara Kita is one of 15 Asian organizations included in the APCOM Foundation's "Supporting LGBTQI Rights in Asia: Connecting Voices for LGBTQI Socio-Economic Inclusion and Human Rights in Asia" project led by Global Affairs Canada. The project will give the involved organizations subgrants to improve any identified knowledge or skill gaps identified in areas such as project management, lobbying, resource mobilization, etc. Suara Kita was also a recipient organization of Outright International's COVID-19 Global LGBTIQ Emergency Fund.

== Community support ==
Suara Kita has helped transgender people disowned by their family, running away family, or at risk of violence escape since 2014. The organization provides shelter as well. Suara Kita runs open kitchens for unemployed transgender women.

Sri Loved also helps run the Dapur Umum Rusun Bidara Cina, an apartment communal kitchen in East Jakarta to help residents facing financial hardships. After disabled teenaged resident was sexually assaulted by a neighbor, Sri Loved raised 20 million RP (about US$1120) for her care and as an honorarium for her attendant until June 2021. The attendant served as a go-between with her father and the Jakarta Integrated Service Center for Women's and Children's Empowerment to help them collaborate in the teenager's trauma recovery. The attendant cooked for the girl and taught her about social ettiquette and personal safety. The money also helped pay for the girl's underwear and sanitary napkins since her father was struggling financially. In August 2020, the organization raised over 17.4 million RP (about US$975) for an 11 year old rape victim to go towards her recovery, education, and family expenses.

As of 2024, Suatra Kita has helped 650 transgender women obtain identity cards. These IDs are required to vote, drive, and access public services. Lacking one can make getting a job difficult. Transgender women in Indonesia are often kicked out as teens and can lack the means of paying to travel and obtain a card. Suatra Kita volunteers helped transgender women update their ID photos and served as guarantors for trans women who haven't submitted their biometric data required for an ID. After the organization spent a decade lobbying and helped field the necessary personnel, a memorandum of understanding was released by the Ministry of Home Affairs in 2021. The memorandum allows cases of missing identity documents to be handled by local administrators instead of being referred to Jakarta. A letter by ministry's Directorate-General of Population and Civil Registration told regional offices to assist transgender people in obtaining or changing their identity documents. It also allowed transgender organizations to verify letters proving someone's birth sex instead of a state healthcare provider. In complex ID cases such as those of transgender women, it reduces the wait time from three months to a week or only a few hours.

== Challenges ==
The Ministry of Information blocks websites it views as pornographic, including the websites of LGBTQ+ organizations like Suara Kita. Suara Kita's social media content has also been repeatedly filtered out in 2016 and 2017. The Islamist Family Love Alliance, a group that lobbies to outlaw premarital sex, openly monitors Hartoyo's Facebook page.

Teguh, a spokesperson for Suara Kita, expressed concern about the worsening political climate for LGBTQ+ in 2016, saying, "Now we must really be careful about what we’re doing because at any time we can be raided by officials or a fundamentalist group. This fear makes sense, an Islamic hardliner group has already raided houses allegedly rented by a lesbian community." The organization had to start keeping its gate shut until tensions declined, while staff at Arus Pelangi, another Jakarta- based LGBTQ+ organization, had to walk home in pairs on different routes.

In May 2022, Suara Kita's email and YouTube account was hacked. The hacker changed the organization's YouTube channel page to show an Elon Musk video instead of their content. Though control of the email was regained, the YouTube account was deleted due to rule violations committed by the hacker and could not be recovered.

In 2023, several Indonesian university groups and LGBTQ+ organizations were suspended from Instagram. In May, Suara Kita's Instagram and Facebook accounts were restricted to no longer add links due to unclear community guideline violations.

== History ==
Hartoyo decided to found an LGBTQ+ organization after being tortured in police department in Aceh in January 2007. The process of building Suara Kita began the same year with a group of LGBTQ+ people in Jakarta. Hartoyo said he created it to "celebrate our identity and social justice." The organization officially launch on March 30, 2009, to address human rights issues faced by gender and sexual minorities. Suara Kita gained legal recognition from the Ministry of Law and Human Rights on May 21, 2013.

== See also ==
- LGBTQ rights in Indonesia
- Lambda Indonesia
- GAYa Nusantara
- Internet censorship in Indonesia
