= List of gender identities =

This is a list of gender identities. Gender identity can be understood to include how people describe, present, and feel about themselves.

== A ==
- Abinary
- Agender
  - Agenderfluid
  - Agenderflux
  - Genderblank
  - Genderfree
  - Gendervoid
  - Polyagender
- Ambigender
- Androgyne
- Androgynous
- Aporagender
- Autigender
- Autonomique

== B ==
- Bakla
- Bigender
- Binary
- Bissu
- Butch

== C ==
- Caelgender
- Calabai
- Calalai
- Cisgender can be defined as "personal identity and gender corresponds with their sex assigned at birth."
  - Cis female
  - Cis male
  - Cis man
  - Cis woman
- Colorgender
- Crystagender

== D ==
- Demi-boy
- Demiflux
- Demigender
- Demi-girl
- Demi-guy
- Demi-man
- Demi-woman
- Dual gender

== E ==
- Egogender
- Eunuch

== F ==
- Faʻafafine
- Female
- Female to male
- Femme

== G ==
- Gender bender
- Gender diverse
- Gender gifted
- Genderfae
- Genderfaun
- Genderfluid can be defined as a gender identity that is "at times more masculine or feminine, and at times feeling more like a man or woman."
- Genderflux
- Genderfuck
- Genderless
- Gender nonconforming
- Genderpunk
- Genderqueer
- Gender questioning
- Gender variant
- Graygender

== H ==
- Hijra

== I ==
- Intergender can be defined as "an identity somewhat between male and female".
- Intersex
- Ipsogender

== J ==
- Juxera

== K ==
- Kathoey
- Kingender

== L ==
- Leogender (also called reigngender)
- Lykh

== M ==
- Māhū
- Male
- Male to female
- Man
- Man of trans experience
- Maverique
- Meta-gender
- Monogender
- Multigender
- Muxe

== N ==
- Neither
- Neurogender
- Neutrois
- Non-binary can be defined as "does not subscribe to the gender binary but identifies with neither, both, or beyond male and female". The term may be used as "an umbrella term, encompassing several gender identities, including intergender, agender, xenogender, genderfluid, and demigender." Some non-binary identities are inclusive, because two or more genders are referenced, such as androgyne/androgynous, intergender, bigender, trigender, polygender, and pangender. Some non-binary identities are exclusive, because no gender is referenced, such as agender, genderless, neutrois, and xenogender.
- Non-binary man
- Non-binary transgender
- Non-binary woman

== O ==
- Omnigender
- Other
- Outherine

== P ==
- Pangender
- Person of transgendered experience
- Polygender
- Proxvir

== Q ==
- Queer
- Quoigender

== S ==
- Sapphogender
- Sekhet
- Stargender
- Staticgender

== T ==
- Third gender
- Trans can be defined as "outside the gender binary; is not cisgender."
  - Trans*
  - Trans female
  - Trans male
  - Trans man
  - Transnull
  - Trans person
  - Trans woman
- Transgender can be defined as "gender identity differs from their sex assigned at birth."
  - Transgender female
  - Transgender male
  - Transgender man
  - Transgender person
  - Transgender woman
- Transfeminine
- Transmasculine
- Transandrogynous
- Transsexual
  - Transsexual female
  - Transsexual male
  - Transsexual man
  - Transsexual person
  - Transsexual woman
- Travesti
- Trigender
- Tumtum
- Two spirit

== U ==
- Unigender

== V ==
- Vakasalewalewa

== W ==
- Waria
- Winkte
- Woman
- Woman of trans experience

== X ==
- X-gender
- X-jendā
- Xenogenders can be defined as a gender identity that references "ideas and identities outside of gender". This may include descriptions of gender identity in terms of "their first name or as a real or imaginary animal" or "texture, size, shape, light, sound, or other sensory characteristics".

== See also ==
- Gender neutrality in languages with gendered third-person pronouns
- LGBTQ slang
- Neopronouns
- Singular they
