= GAYa NUSANTARA =

Indonesian LGBTQ rights organization

GAYa NUSANTARA is an Indonesian civil rights organization that focused on LGBTQ rights in Indonesian communities through research, publication, education, and advocacy.

== History ==
After the disbandment of the Lambda Indonesia, first openly gay organization in Indonesia in 1986, Dede Oetomo found this organization on August 1, 1987, to continue the movement. The writing of the organization's name itself the first three letters of the first word, which are written in capitals to highlight the word "Gay" because, at first, the organization focused only on gay people. However, they expanded their work to include a greater diversity of LGBT people in Indonesia. After working for more than twenty years, the organization was legally recognized by the government on June 27, 2012.

== Works ==
They regularly published a zine as part of their movement, with the first issue published around November 1987. At its peak of publication, the zine sold 1,000 copies (or had a circulation of 1,000 prints). The print publication stopped in 2005 but returned as an online publication in 2014.

On 7 June 2016, the organization plan to conduct an event to disseminate information regarding the prevention and treatment of HIV/AIDS within the gay community. This initiative was a component of the "Gua Berani" campaign, which translates to "I am brave", aimed at encouraging individuals to undergo HIV testing and ascertain their status. The event was cancelled. Law enforcement authorities reportedly perceived the intended gathering as an LGBT-focused event, and consequently, the requisite permits for conducting the event were not granted by local police. On 2022, the organization critiqued Mahfud MD for his opinion of the criminalization of homosexuality in Indonesia as part of Indonesian Criminal Code as violation of the Universal Declaration of Human Rights. In the same year, the organization also criticized Ahmad Riza Patria for his statement asserting that Citayam Fashion Week, a street fashion festival in Indonesia, constituted an LGBTQ movement. They further accused Patria of spreading homophobia.
