= Wawan Kurniawan =

Wawan Kurniawan is an Indonesian writer from Makassar, South Sulawesi. He works in poetry, short fiction, essays, and novels. His poetry collection Museum Kehilangan has been the subject of academic studies, while his novel Seratus Tahun Kebisuan has received coverage in Indonesian media and was included in the 2026 longlist of the Kusala Sastra Khatulistiwa.

== Life and career ==
Kurniawan began publishing literary work in the 2010s. His early books include the poetry collection Persinggahan Perangai Sepi (2013) and Sajak Penghuni Surga (2017). He later published the essay collection Sepi Manusia Topeng and continued writing poetry and short fiction.

His poetry collection Museum Kehilangan, published in 2020 by Gramedia Pustaka Utama, consists of 65 poems. The collection addresses loss and memory and has attracted academic attention for its use of figurative and symbolic language.

A 2022 study in the Jurnal Pendidikan dan Konseling examined Museum Kehilangan through semiotics, focusing on the use of icons, indexes, and symbols in the poems. The researchers treated the collection as their primary literary object and analyzed its 65 poems.

A separate study published in Metakognisi examined the connotative meanings of 17 poems from the collection. The researchers used a qualitative descriptive approach to examine the additional meanings and emotional associations contained in the poems.

Kurniawan subsequently published the short-story collection Aku Mengeong in 2021. His writing has continued across several literary genres, including poetry, short stories, essays, and fiction.

== Seratus Tahun Kebisuan ==
Kurniawan's novel Seratus Tahun Kebisuan was published by DIVA Press in 2025. The novel centers on the bissu, a culturally and spiritually significant tradition among the Bugis people of South Sulawesi.

The novel received particular attention for its treatment of cultural memory and the marginalization of the bissu. In an August 2025 article, Jawa Pos discussed the novel as an attempt to address what Kurniawan described as the systematic forgetting of the bissu tradition. The article presented the novel as both a literary work and a reflection on the preservation of Bugis cultural heritage.

Seratus Tahun Kebisuan had previously been selected as one of the works in the 2017 Unnes International Novel Writing Contest. Following its publication, the novel was included in the 2026 longlist of the Kusala Sastra Khatulistiwa in the novel category.

== Ubud Writers & Readers Festival ==
In 2025, Kurniawan was selected as one of ten writers for the Emerging Writers Program of the Ubud Writers & Readers Festival (UWRF). The selection was made from 647 submissions received from writers across Indonesia.

The UWRF selection was based on a curatorial process conducted by writers Ni Made Purnama Sari, Shinta Febriany, and Ratih Kumala. The selected writers were to participate in a writing program and have their work published in the festival's annual anthology.

IDN Times Sulsel subsequently profiled Kurniawan among three South Sulawesi writers participating in UWRF 2025. The article described him as a writer working across poetry, short fiction, essays, and novels, and highlighted Seratus Tahun Kebisuan and Museum Kehilangan as his recent works.

== Works ==
- Persinggahan Perangai Sepi (2013)
- Sajak Penghuni Surga (2017)
- Sepi Manusia Topeng (2017)
- Museum Kehilangan (2020)
- Aku Mengeong (2021)
- Seratus Tahun Kebisuan (2025)
- Arsip Bencana Masa Depan (2026)
