= Lambda Indonesia =

Indonesian LGBTQ rights organization

Bulletin G, First Edition, August 1, 1982

Lambda Indonesia was the first openly gay association in Indonesia and Asia focused on LGBTQ rights in Indonesia.

== History ==
The association was founded on March 1, 1982, in Surakarta, Central Java, by three gay men, including Dede Oetomo, after they had communicated with 200 gay men from around Indonesia for almost a year. Although intended primarily for gay men, a small number of its members were lesbians. Their inclusion began when Oetomo sent a letter reacting to correspondence in Tempo magazine from Saskia Wieringa, Marianne Kotoppo, Julia Suryakusuma, and Toeti Heraty. These letters were themselves a response to the poor reception of an initial letter by Wieringa, which had defended the marriage of Jossie and Bonnie. Oetomo said he hoped they would share membership forms with their lesbian friends. However, after a year, a few lesbian members, including Gayatri and Syarifah Sabaroedin, left the organization because they felt their issues were being neglected. They finally disband in 1986 after they held its last congress in Surabaya. Their founding date, March 1, is commemorated as Indonesian LGBTIQ Solidarity Day.

== Works ==
The organization outlined four main objectives such as creating a nationwide support system for gay men, establish connections between gay Indonesians and international gay activists, foster a sense of self-worth and dignity within their community, and to combat inaccurate information about homosexuality circulating in the media and among the public. While its approaches were somewhat shaped by the gay rights movement in the West, they did not make a human rights agenda or the promotion of individual sexual freedom as its main focus. Instead, the organization drew upon Indonesia's own diverse history of sexuality to counteract the opinion that that homosexuality was incompatible with Indonesian cultural values such as gemblak and mairil in Islamic boarding schools. In its activism, it focused on educating and sharing information through media such as its zine. The zine was published in eight editions from 1982 to 1984. It was named "Gaya Hidup Ceria".
