= LGBTQ rights in Indonesia =

- Indonesia
- Legal status: Not criminalized in private relationship. illegal in Aceh and since 2026 under morality laws. (Note: see for further information.) Customary laws may apply, depending on what law applies.
- Penalty: Up to 1.5 year imprisonment
- Gender identity: Legal (after sex reassignment surgery and judicial approval)
- Military: No
- Discrimination protections: No

Family rights
- Recognition of relationships: No recognition of same-sex couples
- Adoption: No

Lesbian, gay, bisexual, transgender, and queer (LGBTQ) people in Indonesia face significant challenges not experienced by non-LGBTQ residents. Although same-sex sexual activity is legal in most parts of the country, homosexuality remains disapproved of and stigmatized in Indonesian society. Households headed by same-sex couples are not eligible for the same legal protections available to opposite-sex couples. Indonesia provides no anti-discrimination protections for LGBTQ people, nor does it prohibit hate crimes based on sexual orientation and gender identity. In Aceh, homosexuality is illegal under Sharia law and it is punishable by flogging or imprisonment.

According to a 2025 data from the Pew Research Center, opposition to homosexuality in Indonesia remains high, with 93% of respondents labeling it "morally unacceptable," a figure comparable to Nigeria (96%).

Various forms of conversion therapy are widely practiced and openly advertised in Indonesia including treatment in rehabilitation centres and corrective rape from family members against lesbian women.

In 2016, 2022 and 2025, Indonesia voted against the United Nations independent expert on sexual orientation and gender identity at the United Nations Human Rights Council.

In 2022, the Indonesian government amended its penal code to prohibit sexual activity outside of marriage, a provision set to take in force on 2 January 2026. Unmarried partners who engage in sex can face up to one year in prison. Although the national penal code does not explicitly criminalize same-sex relationships, same-sex marriage is not legally recognized, effectively placing all sexual activity between same-sex partners outside legal recognition.

Raids on private "gay parties" by police have occurred a number of times in the 2010s and 2020s.

== Legality of same-sex sexual activity ==
In December 2022, the Indonesian Parliament has passed a bill of Penal code that in part criminalize sex outside of marriage for patner if lodged by a complaint by immediate family. The spokesperson for the draft bill stated that, the draft bill will not criminalize private sexual orientation, included of LGBTQ persons. Then Coordinating Minister for Political, Legal, and Security Affairs of Indonesia, Mahfud MD said the new penal code did not criminalize an LGBTQ person when the new penal code was passed. It only targets at adults who does “sexual violence” or rape of underage children of the same-sex and committing immoral acts in public.

Currently, unlike its neighbouring Commonwealth country, Malaysia, Indonesia does not explicitly have a sodomy law. The national Penal Code does not prohibit non-commercial, private and consensual sexual activity between two consenting adults of the same-sex. A national bill seeking to criminalize same-sex sexual activity, along with cohabitation, adultery and the practice of witchcraft, failed to be enacted in 2003 and no subsequent bill has been reintroduced.

Indonesia allows one of its provincial government to establish specific sharia-based laws, such as criminal sanctions for homosexuality. These local penalties exist in the province of Aceh, which has special autonomous status under Indonesian law and implements Islamic Sharia-based criminal law (Qanun Jinayat). Under the 2014 Qanun Jinayat, consensual same-sex sexual acts between adults are punishable by up to 100 lashes or up to 100 months (8 years) imprisonment. In several high-profile cases, men have been publicly caned after being found guilty of having same-sex relations. In 2015 two Muslim women were rehabilitated for hugging in public in Banda Aceh, with a police official telling reporters that they "suspected the women were lesbians."

Indonesia itself has allowed private and consensual sexual activity between members of the same sex since 1993, at an 18 years of age.

The Constitution does not explicitly address sexual orientation or gender identity. It does guarantee all citizens various legal rights, including equality before the law, equal opportunity, humane treatment in the workplace, religious freedom, freedom of opinion, peaceful assembly, and association.

The government also has taken specific steps to censor films and other media content that is deemed to be "promoting" homosexuality. In 2016, the government announced plans to ban several websites and computer applications that promotes homosexuality. A survey conducted by Pew Research Center in 2023 estimated that 95% of Indonesians oppose same-sex marriage.

=== Calls for discrimination and criminalization ===
The most active opposition against the recognition of LGBTQ rights in Indonesia has come from religious authorities and pressure-groups, especially Islamic organisations. Indonesian Ulema Council (Majelis Ulama Indonesia or MUI) has made a statement, which stigmatised the LGBTQ population by declaring them "deviant" and an affront to the "dignity of Indonesia".

In 2005, the Indonesian government gave Aceh Province the right to introduce Sharia Law, albeit only to Muslim residents. The northernmost province of Aceh proceeded to enact a sharia-based anti-homosexuality law that punishes anyone caught having gay sex with 100 lashes. The law was set for enforcement by the end of 2015. Another example is the city of Palembang which introduced jail and fines for homosexual sex (though the laws are disbanded as of 2020.) Under the law, homosexuality is defined as an act of "prostitution that violates the norms of common decency, religion, and legal norms as they apply to societal rule." The following acts are defined as acts of prostitution: homosexual sex, lesbian sex, sodomy, sexual harassment and other pornographic acts.

In March 2015, Indonesian Ulema Council (Majelis Ulama Indonesia or MUI) issued a fatwa, or religious edict, called for same-sex acts to be punished by caning, and in some instances, the death penalty. The fatwa considers homosexuality a curable disease and says homosexual acts "must be heavily punished."

Indonesian People's Representative Council (DPR) has dismissed the suggestion that the death penalty would be introduced for same-sex acts, citing that it is quite impossible to implement that policy in Indonesia. The DPR said that the MUI fatwa only serves as moral guidance to adherents, not as positive law, since legal power is only possessed by the state.

In March 2016, amid a surge in anti-LGBTQ sentiments that began earlier in the year, parties like the Prosperous Justice Party (PKS) and the United Development Party (PPP) proposed an anti-LGBTQ bill aimed at banning LGBTQ rights activism and criminalizing LGBTQ behavior. Various politicians made statements against the LGBTQ community in following months that year.

In 2017, two young gay men (aged 20 and 23) were sentenced to being caned in front of the public in the Aceh province.

On 14 December 2017, the Constitutional Court of Indonesia issued a 5–4 ruling rejecting a petition by the conservative Family Love Alliance which sought to amend the Indonesian Penal Code to make gay sex and sex outside of marriage illegal. There were three articles of the Indonesian Penal Code (KUHP) petitioned for review, namely article 248 on adultery, article 285 on rape, and article 292 on child abuse. Under article 292 of the Penal Code, child sexual abuse is a crime, both heterosexual or homosexual conducts. The petitioner sought to erase the term "underage" in article 292, in order to persecute all same-sex sexual conducts of all ages, including among consenting adults. Which meant the petitioner sought to criminalise homosexuality. The court rejected to amend the law and held that the issue was a matter of the Indonesian legislature.

Since January 2018, as part of revising the penal code, lawmakers have been working on a penal code draft. Despite the international criticism and the human rights organisations fears, if passed, the law would criminalise consensual sex between two unmarried people, cohabitation, adultery and rape. It will also enable lesbian, gay, bisexual or transgender people to be taken to court for their sexual orientation.

In late September 2019, the outgoing People's Representative Council's plan to pass the revised penal code (RKUHP) was met with widespread student demonstrations on 23, 24 and 25 September 2019. The revision of the Penal Code (RKUHP) is increasingly discriminating against LGBTQ people. Article 421 (1) concerning obscenity explicitly mentions the same-sex acts: "Everyone who commits obscene acts against other people of the same sex in public is convicted with a maximum imprisonment of 1 year and six months or a maximum fine of category III." The explicit mention of "same sex" obscenity is feared triggering discriminatory treatment and will generate bylaws that particularly targeting LGBTQ people. As the response on this widespread opposition, the government have either postponed or intercepted this controversial revised penal code.

=== Arrests and detention by police ===
In late November 2016, the Islamic Defenders Front (FPI) tipped off police in Jakarta that there was a "sex party". The police then raided the gay gathering, charging the men with violating the national law against pornography.

In 2017, police launched multiple raids on gay saunas under the pretext of pornography-related offences. In May 2017, 141 men were arrested for a "gay sex party" in the capital Jakarta; ten were charged. On 21 May 2017, police detained 144 people in a raid on a gay sauna, Atlantis Gym Jakarta. The Indonesian Ulema Council made a statement that such activity is blasphemy against religion and an insult against Indonesian culture. The Head of Law Department of MUI stated that "What kind of logic that able to accept this kind of sexual deviation" and incorrectly stated that "even animals are not gay". Earlier in the same month, 14 men were arrested at a "gay party" in Surabaya. Another raid took place in October 2017, when Indonesian police raided a sauna in Central Jakarta popular with gay men, arresting 51 people, although only six were charged, including the spa owner.

On 11 August 2022, Rodrigo Ventocilla, a 32-year old Peruvian economist and homosexual activist, died at the Sanglah General Hospital in Denpasar, Indonesia. He died in police custody after being arrested five days earlier by the Indonesian National Police after being accused of drug trafficking. Ventocilla had arrived in Indonesia for celebrating his honeymoon after his marriage with Sebastian Marallano. As per the police, he was arrested for carrying illegal drugs, and later ingested some concealed drugs during police custody, which led to his death later. However, the family of Ventocilla and LGBTQ activists argued that it was a case of racial discrimination and transphobia.

On 22 June 2025, police had conducted a raid on a gathering at a private villa, described as a "gay party," and arrested 75 people near the capital city of Jakarta. Police detained nine people following a raid on a "gay party" at a private hotel in South Jakarta on 24 May, while 56 individuals were detained for participating in "a gay party" in a raid on a different private hotel in South Jakarta on 1 February.

On 11 August 2025, two men, aged 20 and 21, were sentenced to public caning for kissing. They were arrested in April after police broke into the toilet.

In August 2025, three men suspected of creating a LGBTQ community page on Facebook have been arrested by police. If convicted, they could face up to 12 years in prisons and fines of up to 6 billion rupiah.

On 22 May 2026 judge sentenced 25 people to prison for violating anti pornographic law.

== Recognition of same-sex relationships ==
Indonesian law does not recognise same-sex marriage, civil unions or domestic partnerships.

== Military service ==
There is no military law that clearly states that LGBTQ people are prohibited from joining the military. However, several soldiers were fired because they were caught having same-sex sexual activity under the ST/1648–2019 telegram.

Some of them were also imprisoned for allegedly "disobeying a service order". Aprilio Manganang becoming the first service member in 2021 to legally change gender from female to male, although his case was intersex and assigned female at birth and was raised as a girl.

In December 2022, it was reported that soldiers within the Indonesian military - who have engaged in "consenting gay sex between adults in private" are facing jail time (by a crackdown from the government).

In 2023, General Andika Perkasa stated LGBTQ people have the same rights as other Indonesian citizens and that there are no laws that says LGBTQ people can't serve in the military. However, he realized that soldiers aren't allowed to have same-sex sexual activity while serving in Indonesia's military. He added that there was a case of members of the military joining an LGBTQ group, but was not fired for their sexual orientation. Perkasa explained further that LGBTQ soldiers could be fired or punished if they commit 'indecent sexual acts'. For example, if they have a sex video and they spread it.

== Adoption and family planning ==
Same-sex couples are not eligible to adopt a child in Indonesia. Only married couples consisting of a husband and a wife can adopt.

== Discrimination protections ==
As of 2019, no specific law exists to protect Indonesia citizens from discrimination or harassment based on their sexual orientation or gender identity. Nevertheless, government agencies are slowly starting to enact anti-discrimination policies. The Attorney General's Office recently rescinded a public job offer declaring LGBTQ persons need not apply because of mental insanity after being advised by the National Commission on Human Rights.

In March 2019, a 30-year-old Indonesian police brigadier known as TT filed a case in the Semarang State Administrative Court in Central Java against the provincial police alleging a violation of the law on discrimination claiming he was fired for being gay after colleagues forcefully outed him and his partner. He also filed a complaint to the human rights commission. In May 2019, the court rejected the lawsuit. His lawyer said the panel of judges decided that they could not continue examining the case because TT should have first appealed the dismissal to the authorities within the Central Java Police when he received the termination letter before resorting to filing a lawsuit.

Though Indonesia does not explicitly have discrimination protections enshrined by the Indonesian constitution, the Indonesian police authorities ruled a circular letter since 2015 that it would process any hate speech related to sexual orientations and gender identity. The Indonesian government have stated that in a democratic country, every citizen has the right to express and think and that it will be protected and provided by the state. The main purpose to eradicate hate speech is to protect and control a harmonious social life in a heterogenous society. Similarly, the Regulation of the Head of the National Police of the Republic of Indonesia Number 8 of 2009 stipulates the duty of the police to protect the special rights of minority groups, including in the terms of sexual orientation. On the other hand, while not explicitly mentioned in the constitution, theoretically there is a guarantee of protection against discriminatory practices in employment based on any ground in the Constitution and the Human Rights Law (No. 39/1999).

== Gender identity and expression ==
Transgender identity (also called waria) has long been part of Indonesian culture and society. While transgender people in Indonesia are generally more accepted than gays, lesbians and bisexuals, they have, in recent years, faced growing discrimination and rejection, mostly from sharia-supporting Muslim groups, which have become more and more popular in Indonesia. The status of transvestite, transsexual or other transgender persons in Indonesia is complex. Cross-dressing is not, per se, illegal and some public tolerance is given to some transgender people working in beauty salons or the entertainment industry, most notably the celebrity talk show host Dorce Gamalama. Transgender people are allowed to change their legal gender on official documents after undergoing sex reassignment surgery and after receiving a judge's approval. Individuals who undergo such surgery are later capable of marrying people of the opposite legal gender.

Discrimination and harassments directed at transgender people is not uncommon, though violence is quite rare. Indonesian law does not explicitly protect transgender people from discrimination or harassment. Transgender people who do not hide their gender identity often find it challenging to maintain legitimate employment and thus are often forced into prostitution and other illegal activities to survive. The Islamic Indonesian Ulama Council ruled that transgender persons must live in the gender that they were born with. "If they are not willing to cure themselves medically and religiously", said a Council member, they must be willing "to accept their fate to be ridiculed and harassed." However, the Indonesian judicial system takes the contrary position, with cases like Vivian Rubiyanti Iskandar (the first trans Indonesian to be legally recognized as female) giving rise to legal recognition of trans Indonesians' actual genders by the State. There have also been cases where perpetrators of hate crimes against the transgender community were arrested and prosecuted by the Indonesian authorities.

Transgender people in Aceh have also faced targeted enforcement. In January 2018, police in North Aceh arrested twelve transgender women, forcibly cut their hair, compelled them to wear men's clothing, and closed their beauty salons.

=== Recent developments ===
In 2007, Yuli Retoblaut, a transgender person, publicly applied to be a commissioner of the nation's National Commission on Human Rights. The city of Yogyakarta has the only madrasa for transgender people in the world. In January 2018, transgender women were arrested, stripped naked, had their heads shaved, and were publicly shamed in the province of Aceh. Later in March, the Jakarta Social Agency declared waria to be socially dysfunctional. Sources reported that "the agency regularly conducted raids against transgender women". Detained trans individuals are taken by the agency to city-owned "rehabilitation" centres, where they are incarcerated, along with homeless people, beggars, and street buskers, and only released if documentation stating their lack of homelessness was received, and a statement is signed where the individual promises not to repeat their "offence". Officials have stated this is being done to create a deterrent against being transgender, and that continued violations will result in jail time.

Since June 2021, the Ministry of Home Affairs has conducted outreach efforts to issue transgender Indonesians with identification papers, including a Kartu Tanda Penduduk. Transgender residents of Banten, West Java, Central Java, East Java, North Sumatra, South Sumatra, South Sulawesi, Lampung, and Papua have benefited so far. The stated reasoning was that many of them were undocumented, especially where their families did not approve of them (in Indonesia, the family register is an essential identification paper), leaving them without access to work or social services. The Ministry also stated that only the "male" and "female" sex descriptors would be recognized for the time being, with no option for a third gender / X designator, and that transgender Indonesians would have their gender at birth printed unless they had already obtained recognition from the courts.

== Conversion therapy ==
Various forms of conversion therapy are widely practiced and openly advertised in Indonesia including treatment in rehabilitation centres and corrective rape from family members against lesbian women.

There was an attempt to legalize conversion therapy, in a draft titled "RUU Ketahanan Keluarga" (means "Drafted Law of Family Resilience") but got rejected by 5 factions out of 9 factions. Some city governments de facto legalized conversion therapy.

== Living conditions ==
86% of Indonesian citizens identify themselves as Muslim. According to the Ministry of Health (Indonesia) in 2012, Indonesia has around 1 million MSMs both visible or not, more than 5% of them of which are diagnosed with HIV, whereas it is estimated that Indonesia has around 31 thousand Transgender women. It is estimated that the LGBTQ community constitutes around 3% of the Indonesian population, which is around 8 million. The family policy of the authorities and the social pressure to marry and religion means that homosexuality is generally not supported. Both modernist and traditionalist Muslims as well also other religious groups such as Christians, especially Roman Catholics, generally oppose homosexuality. Many Islamic fundamentalist groups such as the FPI (Islamic Defenders Front) are openly hostile towards LGBTQ people by attacking the home or work of those they believe are a threat to the values of Islam.

Explicit discrimination and violent homophobia are carried out mainly by the government and police, while subtle discrimination and marginalisation occur in daily life among friends, family, at work or school. LGBTQ people often suffer abuse by the hands of the police, but it is hard to document due to victims refusing to give statements due to their sexuality. LGBTQ people are often arrested or charged due to their sexual orientation. Gays in jails are often sexually abused due to their sexual orientation, and often do not report it due to being traumatised and fear of being sent back to prison to suffer further abuse.

In January 2018, the Aceh police ransacked a parlour with support from the Aceh autonomous government. The police tortured all LGBTQ citizens within the premises of the parlour, shaved the heads of transgender women, stripped their shirts and bras, and paraded them in the street while forcing them to shout "to become men". The event was criticised by human rights organisation.

=== Media and censorship ===
The Law Against Pornography and Pornoaction (2006) prohibits "…any writing or audio-visual presentation – including songs, poetry, films, paintings, and photographs that show or suggest sexual relations between persons of the same sex." Those in violation of the law could be fined or sentenced to prison for up to seven years. However, the media is now giving homosexuality more media coverage in Indonesia.

In February 2016, the public discourse and debates on homosexuality and LGBTQ issues intensified with the occurrence of high-profile cases of alleged homosexual misconducts, involving Indonesian celebrities. First, an accusation of sexual approach and harassment by TV personality Indra Bekti upon several men. Followed by the case of dangdut singer Saiful Jamil, who has been named a suspect in a sexual assault involving an underage male fan.

After the alleged homosexual scandals involving Indonesian celebrities, in March 2016, the national broadcasting commission emphasised a policy banning TV and radio programs that make LGBTQ behaviour appear "normal", saying this was to protect children and teenagers who are "susceptible to imitating deviant LGBT behaviours". This meant that broadcast companies, especially television stations, are discouraged from featuring effeminate figures, transgender people or cross-dressing in their programs.

Indonesia recently banned many sites, mainly pornographic sites but also any site that has the word "gay" or any word that related to LGBTQ. Indonesia also banned some LGBTQ-related applications like the gay dating service Grindr, though similar dating applications like Walla and Hornet are not banned. Blued, the international version of Walla, is not banned on iOS.

In 2025, a new bill is being discussed that explicitly prohibits content presenting "lesbian, gay, bisexual and transgender behavior" from being published online. Another new bill being discussed would expand the authority of police to surveil and shut down internet access.

=== Political party opinions ===
Most of major political parties and politicians remain silent in the cause of LGBTQ rights. Islamist parties like Prosperous Justice Party (PKS) and United Development Party (PPP) spoke strongly against LGBTQ rights and went further to propose a national bill to ‘ban’ LGBTQ activism. In March 2016, PKS and PPP proposed an anti-LGBTQ bill to ban LGBTQ activism and further marginalize their rights. National Mandate Party (PAN), despite sharing anti-LGBTQ right sentiments with PKS and PPP however, has asked people not to discriminate and harass the LGBTQ community. However, in return, the party also urged LGBTQ people not to promote LGBTQ rights in Indonesia.

Currently, the only political party in Indonesia that has openly supported the LGBTQ rights movement is The Green Party of Indonesia. However, in October 2016, President Joko Widodo stated that he is a defender of LGBTQ rights and that LGBTQ people should have the right not to be discriminated against. Also, some politicians from the PDI-P (Party for the Indonesian Democracy Struggle), PSI (Indonesian Solidarity Party), Labour Party (Indonesia) and the moderately conservative PKB (National Awakening Party) and the has sympathised support for LGBTQ rights. PDI-P further stated that as a pluralist party, they could accept the existence of LGBTQ people. Despite holding that it is deviant behaviour, PDI-P has urged people to tolerate LGBTQ people and not extend hostile sentiments against them.

== LGBT rights movement in Indonesia ==
In 1982, the first gay rights interest group was established in Indonesia. Lambda Indonesia and other similar organisations arose in the late 1980s and 1990s. Today, some of the major LGBTQ associations in the nation include GAYa NUSANTARA and Arus Pelangi.

The gay and lesbian movement in Indonesia is one of the oldest and largest in Southeast Asia. Lambda Indonesia activities included organising social gatherings, consciousness-raising and created a newsletter, but the group dissolved in the 1990s. Gaya Nusantara is a gay rights group which focuses on homosexual issues such as AIDS. Another group is the Yayasan Srikandi Sejati, which was founded in 1998. Their primary focus is health issues about transgender people, and their work includes providing HIV/AIDS counselling and free condoms to transgender sex workers at a free health clinic. There are now over thirty LGBTQ groups in Indonesia.

Yogyakarta, Indonesia, hosted a 2006 summit on LGBTQ rights that produced the Yogyakarta Principles on the Application of International Human Rights Law in Relation to Sexual Orientation and Gender Identity. However, a summit in March 2010 in Surabaya was met with condemnation from the Islamic Defenders Front and was disrupted by conservative protesters.

By 2015, the victory of LGBTQ rights movement in Western countries has had significant implications in Indonesia. As numerous influential Western countries began legalising same-sex marriage since 2001, the LGBTQ rights issue has caught the attention and awareness of the general public in Indonesia and generated public discourse. The popular opinion split into several stances, and the main reaction was not positive. The right-wing elements in Indonesian politics, especially religious-based political parties and organisation have publicly condemned LGBTQ rights. Some argued that currently, Indonesia is under the threat of global LGBTQ "propaganda", which promotes an "LGBT lifestyle". Same-sex marriage or civil union became the main issue discussed in public regarding LGBTQ rights, although LGBTQ activists have argued that currently they do not fight for same-sex marriage, but simply seek the fundamental human rights of security, freedom from fear and freedom of assembly.

The comic Alpantuni depicts a gay Indonesian character who faces anti-LGBTQ sentiment featuring Muslim characters. Its Instagram account later was shut down by authorities. However, he was able to reactivate it later.

In response to a proposed bill meant to mandate conversion therapy to individuals suspected of being LGBTQ, queer-identifying Indonesian musician/songwriter Kai Mata "generat[ed] media buzz for being the first openly gay musician in Indonesia," vocally out amidst government hostility and harsh public sentiment. The comments section echoed support from the international community, hope from closeted Indonesians, and backlash from other citizens, telling her "I’m Indonesian and normal, please leave the country if you do not want to undergo therapy and recover."

=== HIV/AIDS ===
Legal guidelines regarding HIV/AIDS do not exist, although AIDS is a significant problem in most countries in the region. Those infected with HIV traveling to Indonesia can be refused entry or threatened with quarantine. Due to the lack of sex education in Indonesian schools, there is little knowledge of the disease among the general population. Some organisations, however, do offer sex education, though they face open hostility from school authorities. At the beginning of the gay rights movement in Indonesia, LGBTQ organisations focused exclusively on health issues which led to the public believing that AIDS was a "gay disease" and led to LGBTQ people being stigmatised.

=== Opposition ===
Traditionally, Indonesians are quite tolerant towards LGBT people who keep quiet and stay discreet about their private lives. However, this level of tolerance is not extended towards the LGBTQ rights movements, which has faced fierce condemnation in the public sphere from Indonesian authorities. A wave of anti-LGBTQ rhetoric began in January 2016 when Higher Education Minister Mohamad Nasir said LGBTQ people should be barred from university campuses. The Minister called for a ban on gay groups on university campuses after a group of University of Indonesia (UI) students established a counselling and support group called the Support Group and Resource Center on Sexuality Studies (SGRC). The group was meant as a counselling service, resource centre and support group on sexuality and gender issues, especially for LGBTQ youth and students, who often suffer from abuses, harassment, violence and discrimination regarding their gender and sexuality. SGRC sees LGBTQ people as human beings who need a friend and protection. The group, which sought to advocate for those who suffer from gender-based violence, explained that they do not "turn" or "encourage" people to be gay, nor had they tried to "cure" gay people. Amid the heat of the issue, the University of Indonesia refused to be held responsible for SGRC's actions and announced the group was not an officially registered student organisation. Another official pressured smartphone instant-messaging services to drop gay and lesbian-themed emoji, prompting one company to comply.

Generally, religious authorities in Indonesia condemn homosexual acts and are fiercely against the LGBTQ rights movement. The most active opposition has come from majority-Islamic groups, with Majelis Ulama Indonesia, the country's top Muslim clerical body, calling for the criminalisation of homosexuality, although government officials have rejected calls for outright ban on homosexuality. Other religious groups, such as Christianity and specifically Roman Catholicism, have expressed their rejection of LGBTQ rights in Indonesia. Indonesian Catholic authorities have reiterated that Catholicism does not recognise same-sex marriage but assured that, despite their perceived transgressions, LGBTQ people should be protected and not harmed.

The Indonesia Psychiatric Association (PDSKJI) classifies homosexuality, bisexuality and transgenderism as mental disorders. Referring to Law No.18/2014 on Mental Health and the association's Mental Health and Mental Disorder Diagnostic Guidelines, the PDSKJI categorises homosexual and bisexual Indonesians as "people with psychiatric problems" and transgender people as having "mental disorders".

Some military figures have used conspiracy theory rhetoric. Defense Minister Ryamizard Ryacudu called the LGBTQ movement a "proxy war" to brainwash Indonesians, and claimed that it received "foreign funding", pointing to funds from United Nations organisations like UNAIDS or Western governments and foundations.

There have been a few incidents of LGBTQ people being harassed. LGBTQ groups are now working on setting up safe houses and draw up evacuation plans in case of need. In Yogyakarta, in February 2016, 23 LGBTQ activists were roughed up by police, who told local media they stopped them from holding a rally to avoid a clash with a hardline Muslim group holding an anti-LGBTQ protest nearby.

The chair of the People's Consultative Assembly, Zulkifli Hasan mentioned in a statement that, "As a movement, the existence of LGBT must be opposed. We must limit its room to move. However, as individual people, they must be protected like any other citizen.” Anthropologist Sharyn Graham Davies commented that the main focus of this opposition was that sexual and gender diversity may be tolerated but as long as LGBTQ people remain invisible in the Indonesian society and did not form a visible movement. On the other hand, amid fierce hostilities, some officials – including former Governor of Jakarta, Basuki Tjahaja Purnama and former Political, Legal, and Security Affairs Minister Luhut Binsar Panjaitan — have defended the LGBTQ community. "Whoever they are, wherever they work, he or she continues to be an Indonesian citizen. They have the right to be protected as well," Panjaitan said. President Joko Widodo has also expressed support for LGBTQ rights and has called on an end to discrimination.

In 2018, the city of Pariaman in Sumatra passed a public indecency law to fine its gay and transgender residents 1m Indonesian rupiah ($70) for disturbing "public order" by banning "acts that are considered LGBT" in public. The regulation forbids "immoral acts" between same-sex couples and prohibits residents from "acting as a transvestite" in public. Several cities in West Sumatra have taken steps to marginalise LGBTQ groups.

In June 2019, the head of Indonesia's population and family planning agency Nofrijal has labelled LGBTQ citizens the "main enemy of national development".

In October 2025, President Prabowo Subianto declared in a presidential decree that declared the spread of LGBTQ culture a "non-military national threat", putting it in the same category as separatism, terrorism and drug trafficking. Some observers and activists say that the decree could worsen anti-LGBTQ discrimination in society.

== Public opinion ==
Public opinion on same-sex marriage (2023) based on Pew Research Center
1. Strongly favor (3.00%)
2. Somewhat favor (2.00%)
3. Not sure (3.00%)
4. Somewhat oppose (4.00%)
5. Strongly oppose (88.0%)

According to a 2017 poll carried out by ILGA, 32% of Indonesians agreed that gay, lesbian and bisexual people should enjoy the same rights as straight people, while 47% disagreed. Additionally, 37% agreed that they should be protected from workplace discrimination. 38% of Indonesians, however, said that people who are in same-sex relationships should be charged as criminals, while 37% disagreed. As for transgender people, 49% agreed that they should have the same rights, 55% believed they should be protected from employment discrimination, and 41% believed they should be allowed to change their legal gender.

Results online conducted by the ILGA in October 2016 shows that 69% of Indonesians oppose same-sex marriage, 14% support, while 17% have stated a neutral view.

According to the SMRC national survey, 58% of Indonesians agreed that LGBTQ people have the right to live as citizens, whereas 46% of Indonesians would accept if their family members came out as a part of the LGBTQ community.

According to a 2024 survey by the Pew Research Center, 94% of Indonesians would be uncomfortable if their child came out as gay or lesbian.

== Summary table ==
| Right | Legal status |
|---|---|
| Same-sex sexual activity legal | Not criminalized in private relationship. Illegal under morality laws and in Aceh. Penalty: Up to 1.5 years imprisonment. Customary laws may apply, depending on what law applies. |
| Freedom of expression | No Punishable by up to 7 years imprisonment and fines. |
| Anti-discrimination laws in employment only | Limited Theoretically, there is a guarantee of protection against discriminatory practices based on any ground in the Constitution and the Human Rights Law (No. 39/1999). The government claims that LGBTQ people's rights on employment already protected under Law No.39/2003, although it doesn't explicitly cited LGBTQ people. Transgender people still get discriminations since the government only recognize binary gender. Meanwhile, discrimination is also active in employment. |
| Anti-discrimination laws in the provision of goods and services | No |
| Anti-discrimination laws in all other areas (Incl. indirect discrimination, hate speech) | Limited Not enshrined by the constitution but the Indonesian police authorities rules that any hate speech related to gender or sexual orientation could be reported and processed following a legal process. But, in present discrimination to the LGBTQ persons has still common. |
| Same-sex marriages | No |
| Recognition of same-sex couples | No |
| Stepchild adoption by same-sex couples | No |
| Joint adoption by same-sex couples | No |
| Adoption by single people regardless of sexual orientation | Yes By law, adoption must be from a married heterosexual couple. However, single parents are allowed to adopt children if the minister permits. There are no requirements regarding sexual orientation to adopt a child as a single parent. |
| LGBTQ people are allowed to serve openly in the military | No De facto illegal |
| Intersex people are allowed to serve openly in the military | In 1 case, an intersex man was allowed to join the military after surgery |
| Right to change legal gender | Yes Trans/intersex individuals are allowed to change legal gender (requires surgery and judicial approval). Gender/sex change will be recognized by the state as the opposite legal gender. |
| Third gender option | No Despite allowing transgender people to have their own electronic identification card in 9 provinces in June 2021, a third gender option is not available. |
| Access to IVF for lesbians | No |
| Conversion therapy banned | No |
| Commercial surrogacy for gay male couples | No |
| MSMs allowed to donate blood | / No law related to it. MSMs may be prohibited from donating blood under the allegation of "bad habits" on the questionnaire. |
| Homosexuality declassified as a mental illness | Yes The Indonesian Health Ministry (Kemenkes) does not classify homosexuality and bisexuality as a mental disorder, while treats the view of Transgenderism separately. |

== See also ==
- Homosexuality in Indonesia
- Human rights in Indonesia
- LGBT rights in Asia
- LGBT rights in Oceania
- Recognition of same-sex unions in Indonesia
- Suara Kita (Indonesian LGBTQ+ organization)
