= Jossie and Bonnie =

Indonesian lesbian couple

Jossie and Bonnie are two Indonesian women who married on April 19, 1981, the first known lesbian couple to do so in the country. The marriage was not recognized legally, as same-sex marriage is not recognized in Indonesia.

== Early years ==
Jossie identified as a boy from a young age. He often got into fights with boys who taunted him with the term "banci" (meaning sissy), but due to his brown belt in judo, he usually won. Jossie was raised with male-associated toys and clothing, and despite being required to wear skirts at school, consistently exhibited masculine behaviors. After engaging in several altercations with both men and women, she was arrested and placed in a women's prison. There, she met Bonnie, who was also incarcerated for "deviant" behavior. The two began a romantic relationship shortly after their release from prison. The Indonesian magazine Liberty claimed that Jossie had been examined by doctors and found to have 75 percent male hormones and only 25 percent female hormones.

== Marriage ==
In the May 30, 1981 edition, Tempo magazine reported on a wedding reception held on the night of Sunday, April 19, 1981 in Swinging Pub Bar in Blok M, South Jakarta. The reception was attended by around 120 guests, including both families of the couple. Jossie, wearing a light blue suit with a red floral tie, and Bonnie, in a bright red gown. The event did not involve religious or traditional ceremonies, despite both of them being Catholic. The couple cut the wedding cake together, fed each other, and received congratulations from the guests. After the reception, they returned to Jossie's parents' house in Pejaten to prepare for their honeymoon. Although both were legally and medically recognized as women, their families accepted the relationship, but in law of Indonesia forbid same sex marriage based on 1974 Marriage Act, particularly because Jossie was unwilling to undergo gender-affirming surgery to be legally recognized as a man.

=== Reception ===
In response to the article, Saskia Wieringa sent a letter of support to Tempo, although she received hate emails in reply. She then continued the discussion with her friends, Julia Suryakusuma, Toeti Heraty, and Marianne Katoppo. Afterward, the three of them wrote a letter in response to the negative reactions to Saskia's letter, as well as a letter of support for Jossie and Bonnie. Tom Boellstorff noted that the media coverage of the wedding was on par with the murder of Darrell Berrigan in Bangkok.
