= Dede Oetomo =

Indonesian LGBT rights activist

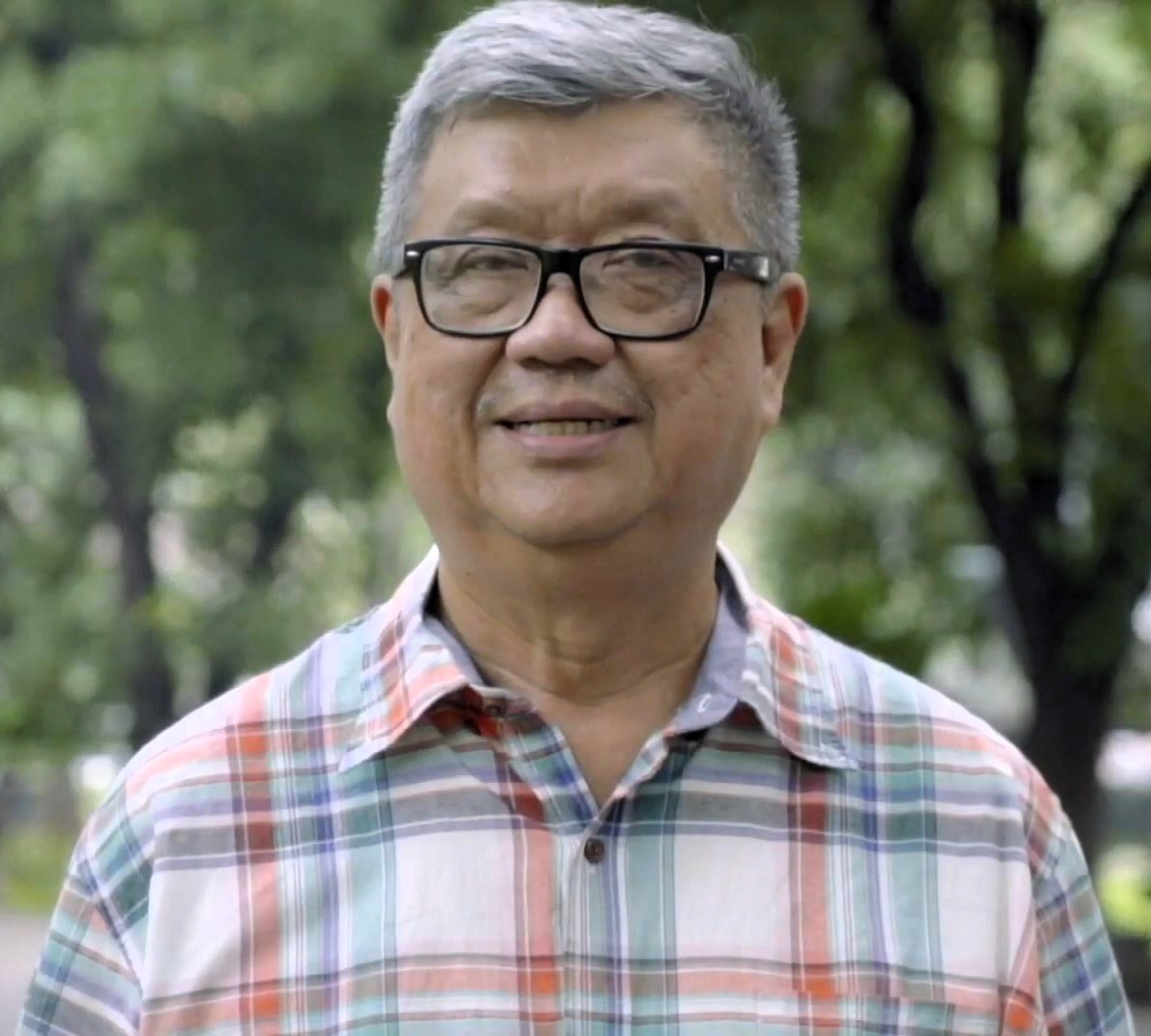
- Oetomo in 2018
- Born: 1953 (age 72–73); Pasuruan, East Java, Indonesia
- Occupation: LGBT rights activist

Dede Oetomo (born 1953) is a campaigner for LGBT rights in Indonesia and an expert on gender issues in East Java. He pursued postgraduate studies at Cornell University in Ithaca, New York. Whilst there, he founded Lambda Indonesia, a gay support group and later set up GAYa Nusantara.

Oetomo is a member of the People's Democratic Party (known as PRD) and has stood in elections. As a student and teacher of linguistics, Dede Oetomo is the author of Beginning Indonesian Through Self-Instruction. He is currently national coordinator of Gaya Nusantara and is an active member of the Asia-Pacific Council of AIDS Service Organisations. He is an Ashoka Fellow and was a recipient of the Felipa de Souza Award in 1998.

== Early life ==
Dede Oetomo was born into a Chinese-Indonesian family in 1953 in Pasuruan, East Java. He describes his family as Westernized; his parents spoke Dutch, and Oetomo speaks Indonesian and Javanese. He attended a Catholic school, but was not raised in a religious family. He learned to speak English in high school using a book entitled English for the SLTP which was developed for Indonesian students with funding from the Ford Foundation. He came out to his parents as gay at the age of 20.

In 1978, he completed a TESOL (Teaching English to speakers of other languages) course and was awarded a grant by the Ford Foundation to study linguistics at Cornell University in Ithaca, New York. He received a second grant in 1984 to work with the Modern Indonesia Project at Cornell. The project, established in the early 1950s by Professor George McTurnan Kahin and Professor John M. Echols, engages in Indonesian area studies. In 1987, Oetomo published a sociolinguistic study on the Chinese-Indonesian communities in Pasuruan.

== Career ==
Dede Oetomo received a scholarship from the Social Science Research Council to assist with his dissertation studies during 1983 and 1984. He then moved into the study of sexuality, gender and the HIV/AIDS issues in Indonesia. Between 1984 and 2003, Oetomo lectured in political science at Airlangga University in Surabaya, East Java. Oetomo has had a large impact on the LGBT movement in Indonesia. His work has helped to produce specifically Indonesian gay and lesbian identities in Indonesia, which he defines as "more or less as they are in the contemporary West".

Lambda Indonesia was started by Oetomo in 1982, whilst he was still at Cornell, as a newsletter providing a forum where people could write letters to receive advice about gay issues. It was one of the first gay organisations in Asia. Lambda was discontinued in 1986 and Oetomo founded Gaya Nusantara. As of 2016, there were over 100 LGBT organisations in Indonesia. However, there was also increasing repression and Oetomo criticised funding groups such as the Ford Foundation, UNDP and USAID for not doing more to help LGBT rights in Indonesia. As of 2019, Oetomo admitted that hard-fought for freedoms were being eroded as part of a broader shift towards conservatism.

The post-Suharto era in Indonesia began in 1998 and Oetomo stood for election several times representing the People's Democratic Party (known as PRD). He also unsuccessfully applied to run the National Commission on Human Rights. In 2010, Oetomo and the feminist activist Soe Tjen Marching established the first journal on sexuality in Indonesia, Gandrung.

Oetomo is an Ashoka Fellow and received the 1998 Felipa de Souza award from the International Gay and Lesbian Human Rights Commission (now OutRight Action International).

== Gaya Nusantara ==
Gaya Nusantara is an LGBT rights organisation set up by Oetomo, which focuses upon human rights education, sexual health including HIV/AIDS awareness and fighting sexual discrimination. From 1987 onwards it has brought out a nationally published newsletter. It highlighted the invisibility of lesbians in Indonesia with articles such as "Indonesian lesbians: Where are you?" (written by Oetomo in 1989) and "Where are the Indonesian lesbians" (Rosawita, 1992). In 1998, the group pressured for LGBT rights alongside other organisations such as Arus Pelangi.
