= Death of Rodrigo Ventocilla =

2022 custodial death in Indonesia

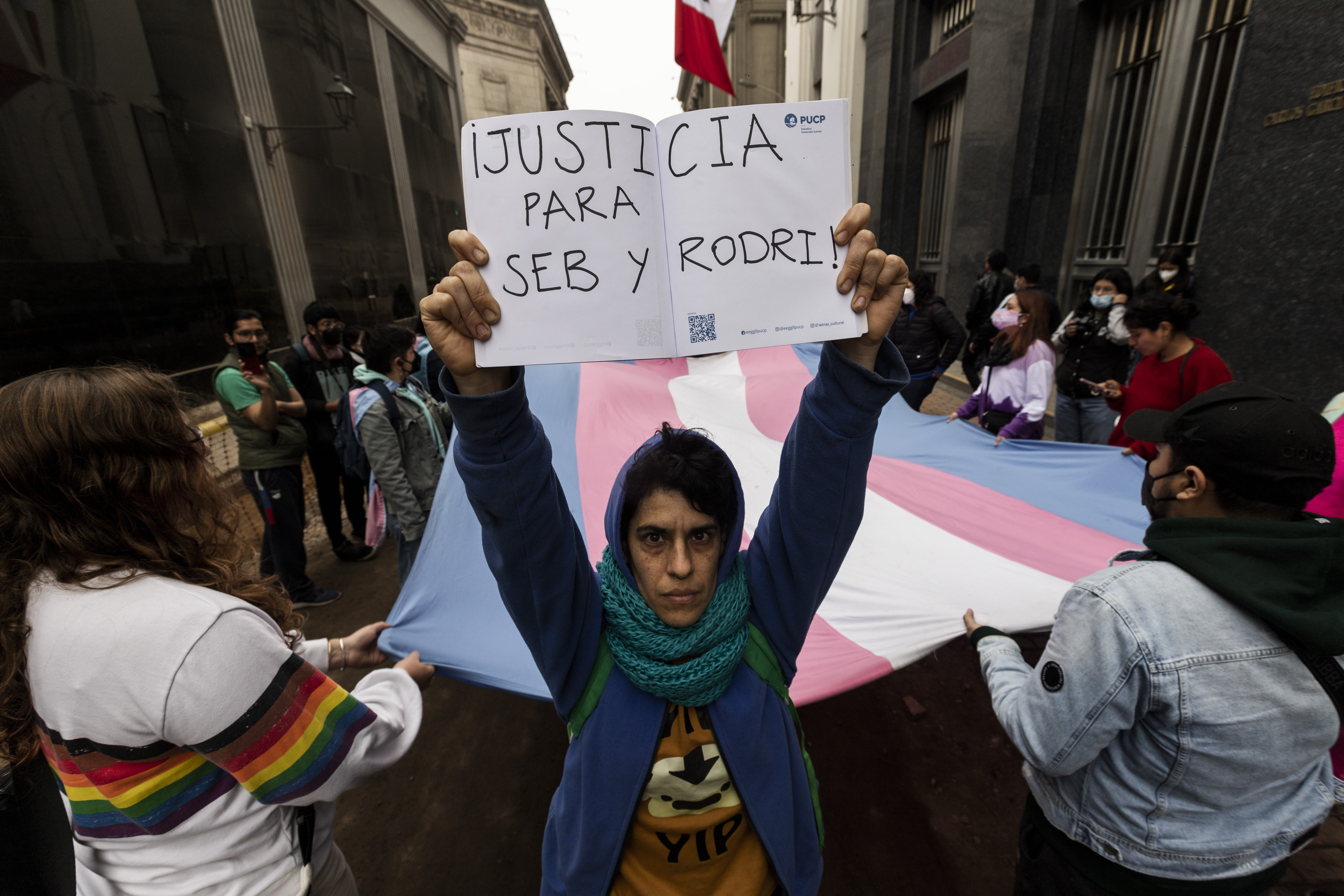
- Date: 11 August 2022
- Location: Sanglah General Hospital, Denpasar, Indonesia
- Type: Custodial death
- Deaths: 1

Rodrigo Ventocilla was a 32-year old Peruvian economist, whose death occurred on 11 August 2022 at the Prof. Ngoerah/Sanglah General Hospital in Denpasar, Bali, Indonesia. He died in police custody after being arrested five days earlier by the Indonesian National Police after being accused of drug trafficking.

Ventocilla was in Indonesia celebrating his honeymoon after his marriage with Sebastian Marallano. As per the police, he was arrested for carrying illegal drugs, and later ingested some concealed drugs during police custody, which led to his death later. However, the family of Ventocilla and LGBTQ activists argued that it was a case of racial discrimination and transphobia, while the Peruvian Foreign Ministry maintained the official account of the Indonesian authorities.

== Background ==
Rodrigo Ventocilla (Born:3 July 1990) was a 32-year-old Peruvian economist who was studying for a postgraduate degree in international developmental public administration at the Harvard Kennedy School from which he was expected to graduate in May 2023. He was a transsexual rights activist and was a founding member of the Peruvian organization Trans Male Diversity. He graduated in economics from the Pontifical Catholic University of Peru, worked as a specialist in public budget in the Ministry of Economy and Finance, and also as an advisor to the executive director of the Lima Project of the Ministry of Education.

In May 2022, Ventocilla married fellow transsexual activist Sebastián Marallano in Chile, where such a marriage is legal. To celebrate the marriage, they decided to go on a honeymoon trip to Bali, Indonesia. They arrived at their destination on separate flights.

== Arrest and death ==
Ventocilla arrived at the Denpasar International Airport on 6 August 2022 on a Qatar Airways flight. He was arrested at the airport by the Indonesian National Police on charges of drug trafficking and transporting illicit substances.

According to the police statement issued after the death of Ventocilla, his arrest was due to the detection of marijuana among his belongings, and there were two pills in a container and another package which they suspected to contain marijuana. As per the police, after the arrest, Ventocilla ingested drugs concealed from the authorities, and on 8 August, he began vomiting and was transferred to the Bhayangkara hospital for medical treatment. In the early morning of 9 August, he began to convulse and hence was transferred to the Sanglah General Hospital. At the hospital, the doctors were not able to stabilize him, and his situation worsened. As per hospital records, Ventocilla died at 3:10 p.m. on 11 August.

== Aftermath ==
An autopsy was conducted a week later, which determined that the cause of death was multiple organ failure and damage to the nervous system. According to The Bali Sun, the police launched an investigation into the "suspected death of a Peruvian", but it not detail whether the investigation pertained to the case of alleged drug trafficking or his death in police custody.

Marallano, who arrived on a separate flight, was also detained after the arrest of his partner. He was released and returned to Peru on 17 August after a social media campaign and donation drive organized by the family in association with various LGBTQ rights associations and human rights activists. Ventocilla's remains were not repatriated immediately due to bureaucratic obstacles, and his body was returned later, and was buried in the Jardines de la Paz cemetery in Lima.

== Response ==
On 12 August, Dean Douglas W. Elmendorf communicated Ventocilla's death to the Harvard Kennedy School student community, and expressed his condolences to the family, while praising the work of Ventocilla as an LGBTQ rights activist, and calling for a meeting for his memory.

On 23 August, Ventocilla's family published a detailed statement addressed to the Ministry of Foreign Affairs, stating the facts of the case. As per the statement, the pills that the police seized among the belongings of Ventocilla were prescription medicines that had correct documents. The family reported that the authorities demanded large sum of money, almost US$200,000 for the release of both, and that both of them were subjected to violence and harassment by the police. The statement further alleged that they were denied legal assistance and they lost communication with both on 8 August. They were informed about the hospitalization only on the next day, and that the Indonesian authorities did not allow the relatives and colleagues of Ventocilla to visit him in the hospital.

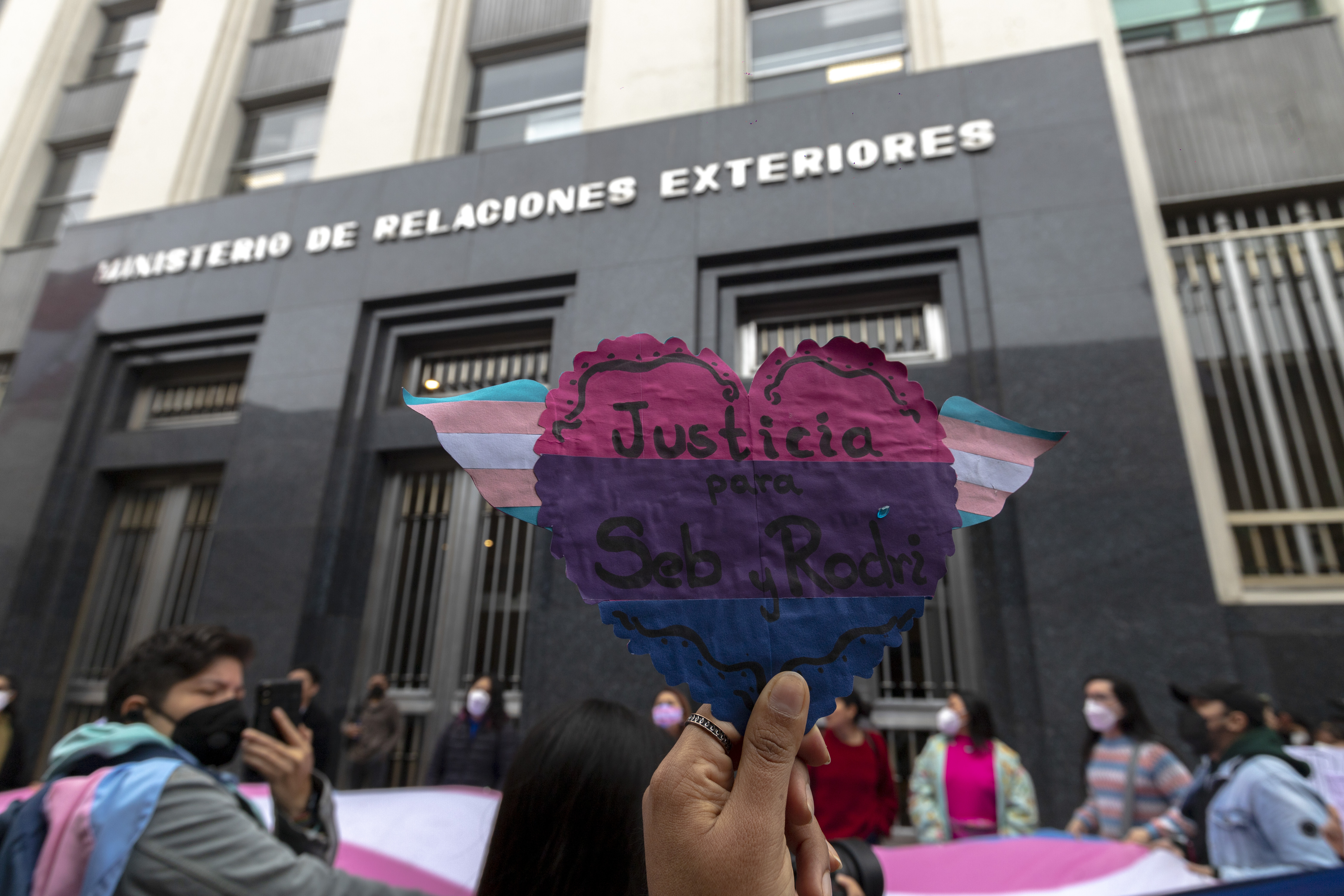
Protests in front of the Foreign Ministry of Peru on 26 August

The family pointed out the helplessness of the Peruvian consul in Indonesia, Julio Eduardo Tenorio Pereyra, and there was no response from him, despite several calls and messages, until after the death of Ventocilla. They family also demanded an independent autopsy. On the same day, Elmendorf released another statement supporting the family of Ventocilla and Marallano and calling for the early clarification of the events surrounding the case.

On 24 August, the Peruvian Foreign Ministry issued a response which supported the version of the events reported by the Indonesian authorities. It stated that the incident was not a hate crime, and Indonesia has zero tolerance for drug possession. It further reported that Peruvian Consulate provided all the assistance and follow-up in the case, even though the family denied it.

On 26 August, the LGBTQ community called a protest in front of the headquarters of the Peruvian Foreign Ministry. Ventocilla's family lawyers announced legal action against Indonesian officials and demanded an apology for the Foreign Ministry's statement. Susana Chavez, president of the LGBTQ rights group Promsex, released a statement against the Foreign Ministry. On 28 August, a vigil was held outside the Indonesian Embassy in Lima. Two days later, the Indonesian government's diplomatic mission in Peru issued a statement reaffirming the official version of its government.
