= Syarifah Sabaroedin =

Syarifah Sabaroedin (1949 – 1 October 2008) was an Indonesian feminist and criminologist who advocated against the discrimination of women.

== Early life and education ==
She was born in Jakarta in 1949. She completed her bachelor's degree in criminology and later obtained a master's degree in philosophy from the University of Indonesia and also studied feminism in Rutgers University and St. Scholastica's College in Manila.

== Career and organization experience ==
Syarifah was a criminology lecturer at the University of Indonesia. During a workshop with the Legal Aid Institute, while representing Kalyanamitra, a women's activism organization together with Nursyahbani Katjasungkana, she coined the term "Pelecehan Seksual" as the Indonesian translation of sexual harassment. During a Women's Congress held in Yogyakarta from December 14–17, 1998, she was elected to a key position. The event, attended by 500 women from Indonesia and 25 from Timor-Leste, coincided with the formation of the Koalisi Perempuan Indonesia (KPI). As part of this, 15 representative sectors were created, and she was elected as one of the coordinators for the Lesbian, Bisexual, and Transgender sector, with Katjasungkana serving as the general secretary. During her membership, KPI wrote a bulletin about the problems faced by lesbian women in Indonesia, which was funded by NOVIB, a branch organization of OXFAM in the Netherlands, with Katjasungkana as the chief editor. Syarifah wrote an article about compulsory heterosexuality, which in Indonesia is considered as "kodrati" or natural, but she views it as a form of violence against women.

Syarifah also founded Kalyanamitra, women's support organization with Debra Helen Yatim, Myra Diarsi, Sita Aripurnami, and Ratna Saptari, established Kalyanamitra in 1985.

== Death ==
Syarifah died on 1 October 2008.

== Publications ==
- 1998: Hak-hak reproduksi perempuan yang terpasung – published by Pustaka Sinar Harapan in Indonesia.
- 2006: Kebertubuhan perempuan dalam pornografi – published by Yayasan Kota Kita in Indonesia.
