= Alpantuni =

Alpantuni is the name of an Instagram account that depicts the life of the titular main character, who is a gay Muslim man in Southeast Asia. There is speculation over whether the creator is Malaysian or Indonesian; when interviewed, the creator of the comic stated that they did not wish to elaborate whether they were from Indonesia or Malaysia.

The account was created in November 2018, but rapidly gained attention in February 2019 by online Indonesians decrying it for its portrayal of homosexuality. The Indonesian Ministry of Communications declared the comics to be pornographic and violating Article 27 paragraph 1 of the 2008 Electronic Information and Transactions Law on the distribution of pornographic content. The account was no long accessible on February 13, 2019; the Indonesian government claimed that Instagram had removed the account after mass outcry from Indonesian internet users. Instagram denies this, and put forth a number of alternative reasons why the account was no longer accessible. The creator of the account claims that though Instagram didn't obey the Ministry's request, it did remove a number of posts for hate speech; however, the creator states that they made the choice to delete the account of fear of putting their loved ones in harm.
