= The Park Pejaten =

- Location: Pasar Minggu, Jakarta, Indonesia
- Coordinates: 6.2804736°S 106.8290129°E
- Address: Jl. Warung Jati Barat No. 39, Jati Padang, Pasar Minggu
- Opened: 1991 (as Pejaten Mall); 2007 (as Pejaten Village); 2023 (as The Park Pejaten)
- Developer: PT. NWP Retail
- Manager: PT. NWP Retail
- Owner: PT. NWP Retail
- Num. of stores: 165
- Num. of anchor tenants: 8
- Floor area: 56000 square meters
- Floors: 8 (6 reatail, 2 parking)
- Parking: 2000 cars
- Public transit: Pejaten
- Website: Pejaten Village

The Park Pejaten is a shopping and entertainment center with a family allotment located on Jalan Warung Jati Barat, Jati Padang, Pasar Minggu, Jakarta in Indonesia. It was built in 1991 as Pejaten Mall, but in 2007 the management, as well as the name, was changed to Pejaten Village. Later in 2020, the management was changed again, and the mall was renamed to its current name.

== History ==
Pejaten Mall was established in 1991 and is managed by Kentjana Widjaja and Pacific Star Properties Ltd. The tenant shop were Rimo Department of Commerce, TOPS Supermarket, Mega 21, and a food-court area named MEGABITEZ. Over time, tenants then changed from Rimo and TOPS to Matahari Department Store and Hypermart.

In 2008, all of its shares were held by Lippo Group through LMIR-Trust, and became one of the malls in the portfolio of PT Lippo Karawaci Tbk. Pejaten Mall began to change its image, and changed its name to Pejaten Village. The entire building underwent a change in face shape. Pejaten Village has 6 floors of shopping centers and 2 basements with a total NLA of 56,000 square meters. Construction began in 2007, and was completed in 2008. Two previous tenants who still survive are Matahari Department Store and Hypermart, while the Cineplex also underwent a change of face and image to become Pejaten Village XXI. Some of the tenants include Kemiri (dining area), Fitness First, Gramedia, Electronic Solution, Waka-Waka Games, Sarinah, Inul Vista, Batik Keris and Sport Station.

On November 13, 2018, a fire was broken out in the mall and adjacent area.

On December 31, 2019, Lippo Group announced that they would sell its shares of Pejaten Village, which costs Rp 997,4 billion. It was later revealed that the Warburg Pincus-sponsored PT. Nirwana Wastu Pratama (NWP) Retail officially bought and acquired the shares in 2020. After the handover, in 2023, NWP Retail began to renovate the mall and later rename it into The Park Pejaten. The renovation was made to recover the numbers of visitors, as the numbers were massively decreased due to the COVID-19 pandemic. Besides that, new tenants like Ace Hardware and Cinépolis (replacing XXI), were opened during the renovation process.

On June 23, 2025, Don Don Donki opened its second 24-hour outlet at the ground floor of the mall, featuring Namba-inspired shopping experience from Osaka, Japan.

== See also ==
- List of shopping malls in Indonesia
