= Waria (person) =

Portmanteau word for the traditional third gender group in Indonesia

Waria are transgender women in Indonesia. The word is a mix of two Indonesian words: wanita (woman) and pria (man). The government introduced the term in 1978. Many waria work in beauty salons or as wedding organizers. They have been part of Indonesian society for a long time, though they faced increased public opposition after 2016 when politicians and religious leaders spoke against LGBT people.

== Terminology ==
Before 1978, common words for waria included banci and bencong. Many waria find these offensive. The word *banci* can also mean an effeminate man, which is not considered the same as a waria. Government officials wanted a more respectful term. A minister named Alamsyah created the word waria with the support of President Suharto. The new term first appeared in the newspaper Kompas on June 7, 1978.

Different parts of Indonesia have their own local words:

- In South Sulawesi, people use calabai, which means "false woman" in the Bugis language.
- In Java and Bali, the word 'kedi appears.
- Older terms include wadam (from wanita plus Adam) and walsu (from wanita palsu, meaning "false woman").

Most waria today prefer waria because it sounds more polite. They tend to see all these different words as meaning the same thing. As one waria told Tom Boellstorff, "They're only terms."

== History ==
=== The bissu ===
Indonesia has had people who did not fit neatly into male or female categories for many centuries. The best known are the bissu of South Sulawesi. These were shamans who were born male but dressed and acted as women. People believed that because they combined male and female categories, they had special spiritual powers.

A Portuguese merchant named Antonio de Paiva visited Sulawesi in 1544 and wrote about the bissu. He was a Christian missionary trying to convert local people. His letters show that bissu advised kings and helped them decide when to go to war. De Paiva blamed them for the fact that the local king chose Islam over Christianity.

Stories about bissu appear in the La Galigo, an old collection of Bugis manuscripts. Some parts of the La Galigo may date back to the 1300s. These texts describe bissu standing in front of armies and guarding sacred objects for the royal court.

=== Emergence of waria ===
The word *waria* itself is new, but people who lived like waria have been around since at least the early 1800s. Early records describe effeminate men working in markets, performing in entertainment shows, and sometimes engaging in sex work.

By the 1830s, there were dances in Batavia (now Jakarta) where young men dressed as women. A Dutch writer mentioned *banci* in 1855. Newspaper accounts from the late 1800s mention certain parts of town where transgender women gathered.

Before the 1960s, many waria wore women's clothing only for performances or at night. This changed between the 1960s and 1980s, when more waria began wearing women's clothing full-time. Around the same time, more waria began working in beauty salons, doing hair and makeup for brides. That job became common enough that many people now associate waria with salon work.

=== Periods of persecution ===
Waria have faced violence at different points in Indonesian history. In the 1950s, a rebel group led by Kahar Muzakkar targeted waria and bissu in South Sulawesi. During the Indonesian mass killings of 1965–66, waria were seen as a threat to national security.

Under Suharto's New Order government (1967–1998), waria could mostly live their lives without major interference. They appeared on television sitcoms and worked in salons. The government also allowed them to form official organizations. In 1972, the Mayor of Jakarta said waria were citizens like anyone else and deserved respect.

== Work and economic roles ==
Waria tend to work in three kinds of jobs. Those who own their own salons can become quite wealthy. Those who work in someone else's salon make a more modest living. Some waria engage in sex work.

Helping at weddings is another important job. Waria act as indo' boting ("wedding mothers") – they organize the ceremony, do the bride's makeup and hair, and ensure everything runs smoothly.

During the economic crisis of 1997–98, many businesses failed. But waria salons stayed open. One waria told a researcher, "Salons beat the banks."

== Religion ==
Most waria are Muslim. Many say being waria is takdir (God's will) or kodrat (fate). According to this view, they did not choose this life; God made them this way.

When waria discuss sin, they often refer to behaviors such as having many sexual partners or engaging in sex work. Many waria do not consider being waria itself as sinful.

Some waria have made the pilgrimage to Mecca. A few have gone as women, dressing in women's clothes and praying with women. Others go as men. One waria claimed to have made the pilgrimage nine times, always as a woman.

A boarding school for waria, Pondok Pesantren Waria Al-Fatah, was founded in Yogyakarta in 2008 by Shinta Ratri. It was the only place in Indonesia where waria could study Islam together and live openly. The school closed in 2016.

== Scholarly debate ==
Most researchers who study waria describe them as transgender women. However, Tom Boellstorff has argued that waria are not a third gender. Instead, he describes them as "male femininity."

Boellstorff points to several examples. At a public park in Surabaya, there are two toilets – one for women, one for men. The men's toilet has a sign that says "pria/waria" (men/waria). There is no third toilet. On some identity cards in East Java, waria had a special designation: "male (waria)." He argues that this shows waria are understood as a kind of man, not a separate category.

Boellstorff also interviewed waria who said things like, "I am an authentic man. If I go on the hajj, I will dress as a man because I was born a man." Another said, "I was born a man, and when I die I will be buried as a man, because that is what I am."

Other scholars note that many waria see themselves as women. They take hormones, get silicone injections, and in some cases have sex reassignment surgery. They want to be called by women's names and treated as women.

== Performance and national belonging ==
Waria have long been involved in performance. Beauty pageants and singing contests are a significant part of waria culture. The Indonesian word playback (lip-syncing) is often used for these shows.

Many waria seek social acceptance through prestasi – good deeds, achievements, and being useful to others. A waria who runs a successful salon or helps organize weddings is respected.

At a waria beauty contest in Makassar, one of the organizers told the crowd: "Waria are now being accepted by society because of all of their good works… This shows that our heroes are not just men and women, but waria."

== 2016 events ==
In January 2016, the Minister of Research, Technology, and Higher Education, Mohamad Nasir, said he wanted to ban LGBT student organizations from university campuses. He later modified this statement on social media, saying that LGBT individuals should receive the same treatment under the law, but that this did not mean the state should legitimize LGBT status.

Following this, other government officials also spoke about LGBT issues. The Minister of Defense described the LGBT rights movement as a "proxy war" and a threat to national security. The Minister of Home Affairs said the government would cancel some local regulations, but not those based on Islamic Sharia.

In February 2016, the Indonesian Broadcasting Commission issued a statement banning television and radio broadcasts related to LGBT people, citing the need to protect children and adolescents. The National Child Protection Commission also issued a statement forbidding the distribution of information about LGBT issues to minors.

The Indonesian Psychiatrists Association stated that homosexual and bisexual people have "psychiatric problems" and that transgender people have "mental disorders."

The largest Muslim organization in Indonesia, Nahdlatul Ulama, issued a statement in February 2016 calling for the criminalization of LGBT behaviors and activism, and for the rehabilitation of LGBT people.

In Aceh province, which operates under Sharia law, same-sex sexual acts are punished with caning. In 2015, Aceh had passed the Qanun Jinayat, an Islamic criminal code that penalizes homosexuality.

In February 2016, the Pondok Pesantren Waria Al-Fatah Islamic boarding school for waria in Yogyakarta was closed.

President Joko Widodo spoke about the issue in October 2016. He said LGBT people should be protected from violence but also stated that Indonesian beliefs do not support LGBT.

Several local governments had previously passed laws affecting LGBT people. South Sumatra passed an ordinance in 2002 classifying anal sex between men as immoral and illegal. Palembang issued a similar law in 2004 that connected homosexuality with prostitution. An anti-pornography law was passed nationally in 2008.

== Health and HIV research ==
Waria have been studied by health researchers since the 1980s, primarily in connection with HIV. They are considered a "key population" – a group at higher risk that receives special attention from health programs.

Some waria engage in sex work, which places them at higher risk for HIV. However, being categorized as a "key population" has also helped waria gain access to funding, health services, and opportunities to organize.

== Organizations ==
Waria have their own groups in many cities. The Forum Komunikasi Waria Indonesia (FKWI) connects waria across the country. FKWI helps older waria who have nowhere to live and runs job training programs.

In Semarang, a group called Perwaris has worked to help waria obtain identity cards that match their gender presentation. Without proper identification, waria can face difficulties with police, employment, and housing. Perwaris also works on environmental issues, as flooding and pollution have affected waria neighborhoods.

== See also ==
- Bissu
- Hijra (South Asia)
- Kathoey
- LGBT rights in Indonesia
- Transgender rights in Indonesia
