= Gender in Bugis society =

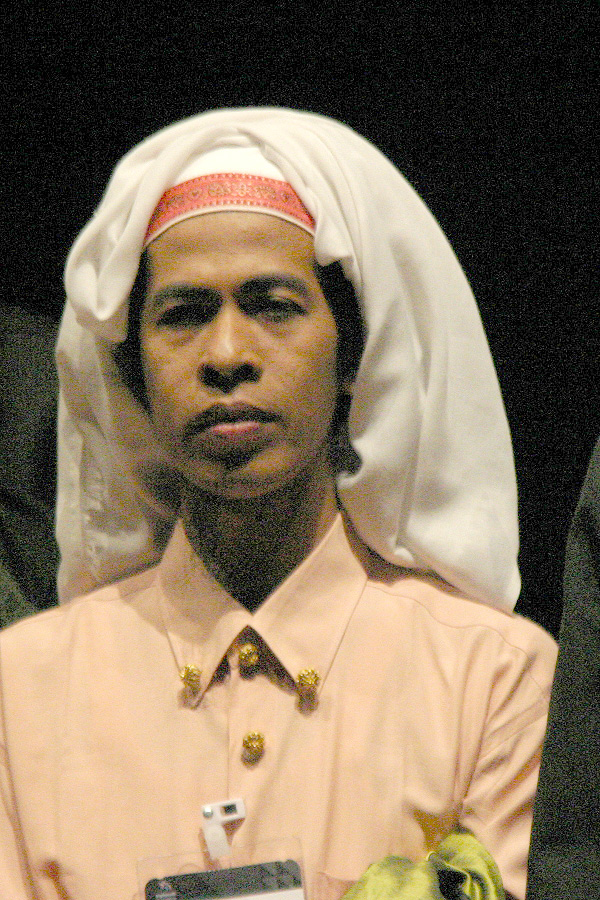
Puang Matoa Saidi, a bissu performer in I La Galigo (a retelling of the Bugi creation myth)

The Bugis people are the most numerous of the three major ethnic groups of South Sulawesi, Indonesia, with about 3 million people. Most Bugis are Muslim, but many pre-Islamic rites continue to be honoured in their culture, including the view that gender exists on a spectrum. Most Bugis converted from Animism to Islam in the early 17th century; small numbers of Bugis have converted to Christianity, but the influence of Islam is still very prominent in their society.

In contrast to the gender binary, Bugis society recognizes five genders: makkunrai, oroané, bissu, calabai, and calalai. The concept of five genders has been a key part of their culture for at least six centuries, according to anthropologist Sharyn Graham Davies, citing similar traditions in Thailand, Malaysia, India, and Bangladesh.

Oroané are loosely comparable to cisgender men, makkunrai to cisgender women, calalai to transgender men, and calabai to transgender women, while bissu are loosely comparable to androgynous or intersex people and are revered shamans or community priests. The classification of the calabai, calalai, and bissu as third genders is disputed. These roles can also be seen as fundamental occupational and spiritual callings, which are not as directly involved in designations such as male and female.

In daily social life, the bissu, the calabai, and the calalai may enter the dwelling places and the villages of both men and women.

== Bissu ==
The bissu are one of the five genders of the Bugis. The word derives from bessi, meaning 'clean' (i.e. holy, not menstruating). There are divergent theories regarding their definitive origins.

For one to be considered bissu, all aspects of gender must be combined to form a whole. It is believed that someone is born with the propensity to become a bissu, revealed in a baby whose genitalia are ambiguous. These ambiguous genitalia need not be visible; an ostensibly male child who becomes a bissu is believed to be female on the inside. This combination of sexes enables a 'meta-gender' identity to emerge. However, ambiguous genitalia alone do not confer the state of being a bissu. The person must also learn the language, songs and incantations, and have a gift for bestowing blessings in order to become bissu. To be considered a "true" bissu, an individual needs to undergo initiation rituals and mentorship from another bissu, but this practice is waning due to the decreasing number of people taking the role. They are expected to remain celibate and wear conservative clothes. In practice, many bissu do partake in sexual activities (especially with oroané), but this is not widely acknowledged and public recognition is seen as delegitimizing to the bissu's spiritual power.

In pre-Islamic Bugis culture, bissu were seen as intermediaries between the people and the gods, according to Indonesian anthropologist professor Halilintar Lathief. The bissu are closely associated with the female yet androgynous moon goddess, as her spiritual offspring. Up until the 1940s, the bissu were still central to keeping ancient palace rites alive, including coronations of kings and queens. Historically, bissu have played an important role in other ceremonies as well, particularly in weddings and childbirth events.

Within the bissu category, there are also several subcategories with differing roles, as described in poems such as La Galigo. One consists of those directly descended from the gods and tightly connected to the courts and nobles. The second consists of landowning bissu who are absent from spiritual roles. The last category consists of bissu whose main roles are in facilitating religious rites.

=== Persecution ===
==== Colonial era ====
The state of bissu tolerance during Dutch colonial rule was mixed, with the colonial government allowing some indigenous social structures to stay in place to maintain agricultural productivity and because they viewed indigenous traditions as a bulwark against Islam. Still, the Dutch contributed to an environment that was hostile to "immoral" sexual practices and identities, especially as a way to differentiate themselves from indigenous people.

==== Post-independence ====
After independence in 1949, the ancient Bugis kingdoms were incorporated into the new republic and the roles of bissu became increasingly sidelined due to their connection with Bugis royalty. Although bissu traditions were able to exist side-by-side with Islamic ideals for much of pre-independence history, a regional Islamic rebellion in South Sulawesi led to increased persecution (part of the Darul Islam rebellion known as Operasi Tobat). As the atmosphere became increasingly hostile to gender and sexual minorities, fewer people were willing to take on the role of bissu. With the rise of Suharto's New Order administration, the bissu were further marginalized as deviant and un-Islamic elements of Indonesian society. The bissu were also targeted during the New Order era because of their purported association with the Communist Party of Indonesia. This persecution included the banning of bissu practices, the destruction of spiritually significant objects, the forced assimilation of bissu to male roles, and the execution of many bissu individuals.

==== Contemporary era ====
In the post-Suharto era, there have been attempts at revitalizing traditional bissu practices, with many elements of bissu custom merging with those of Islamic tradition. Bissu can be found providing Hajj blessings to pilgrims and even partaking in the pilgrimage themselves. However, this revitalization has also caused bissu customs to be viewed as an attraction for tourists, which reduces their tradition to entertainment purposes and disregards the spiritual background on which the practices are based. Bissu also experience greater societal acceptance and respect when they are seen to be actively fulfilling their spiritual roles, but stricter male/female roles are often expected of them instead when they are not. Although the bissu are spiritually (and culturally) distinct from non-binary and intersex people in general, this distinction is becoming increasingly blurred. Many bissu are now engaging in occupations which are associated more closely with waria roles, such as in bridal makeup. Even in Bugis society, the role of the bissu have recently been conflated with those of the calalai and calabai. Due to the decline in bissu, some rituals have begun to substitute calalai and calabai in their place.

Bugis society has a cultural belief that all five genders must coexist harmoniously; but by 2019 the number of bissu had declined dramatically, after years of increasing persecution and the tradition of revering bissu as traditional community priests. Bissu have mostly survived by participating in weddings as maids of honour and working as farmers as well as performing their cultural roles as priests. Hardline Islamic groups, police and politicians have all played their part in Indonesia's increased harassment and discrimination of sexual and gender minorities.

== Calabai ==
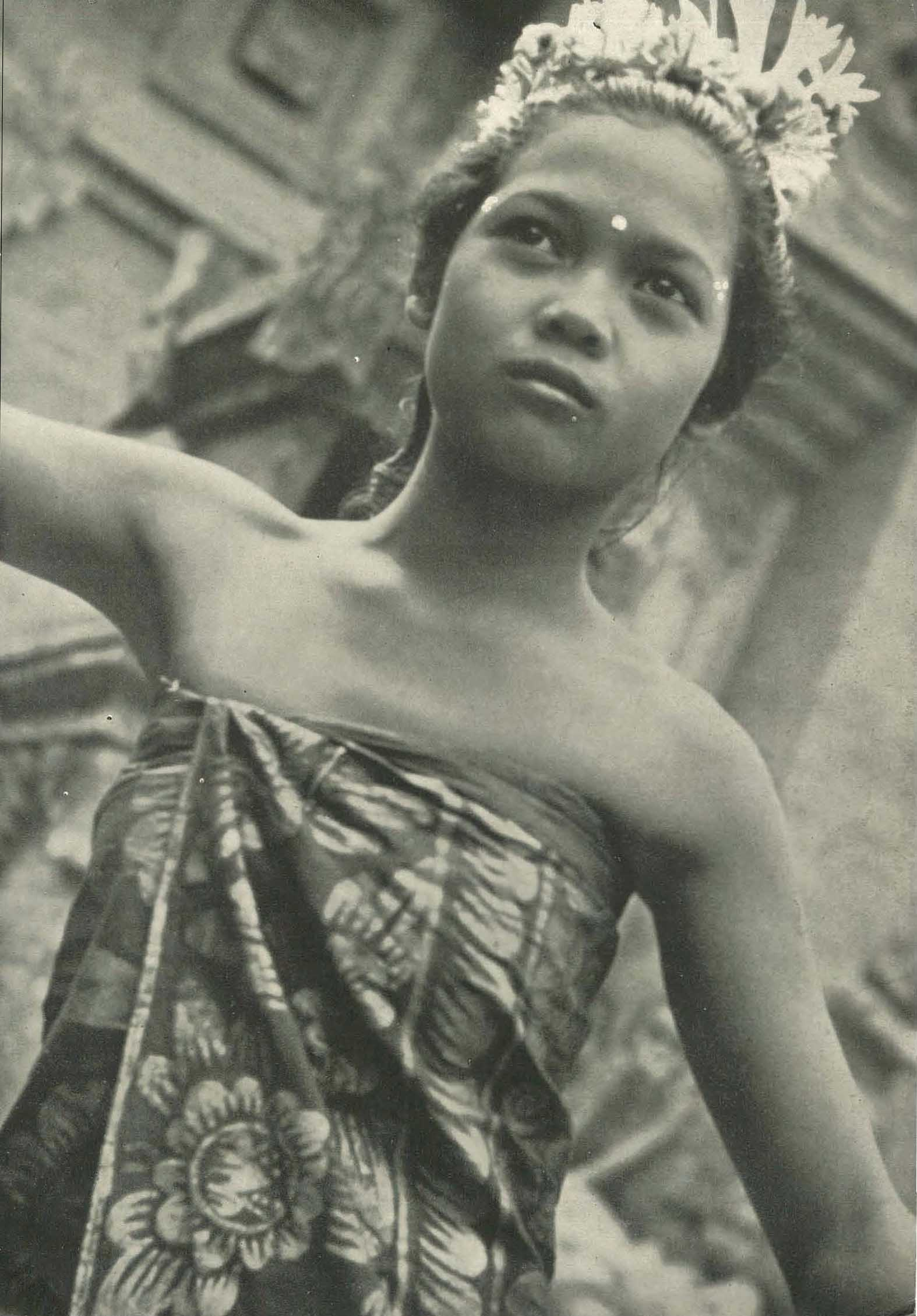
Calabai dancer, 1953

According to the Bugis gender system, calabai are generally assigned male at birth but take on the role of heterosexual women. Etymologically, calabai means 'false woman'. Their fashions and gender expression are distinctly feminine but do not directly match those of "typical" heterosexual women. Especially in the modern era, calabai fashion has also been influenced by styles outside of traditional Bugis culture, such as from Islamic and Christian sources. Customary calabai roles include wedding planning and hairdressing.

If there is to be a wedding in Bugis society, more often than not calabai will be involved in the organization. When a wedding date has been agreed upon, the family will approach a calabai and negotiate a wedding plan. The calabai will be responsible for many things: setting up and decorating the tent, arranging the bridal chairs, bridal gown, costumes for the groom and the entire wedding party (numbering up to twenty-five), makeup for all those involved, and all the food. Rarely did I attend a village wedding with less than a thousand guests. On the day, some calabai remain in the kitchen preparing food while others form part of the reception, showing guests to their seats.

— Sharyn Graham

Calabai embrace their femininity and live as women, but generally do not think of themselves as female, nor wish to be female or feel trapped in a male's body. Large-scale feminization surgeries are not often performed because although many calabai desire more feminine features, male genitalia is not inherently contradictory to their calabai identity. However, the high cost and low accessibility of such surgeries cannot be overlooked as a major barrier either. Much of Indonesian society emphasizes the importance of the nuclear family (in Indonesian, azas kekeluargaan) and heteronormativity, and calabai often conform to this basis by taking on the roles of wives in a nuclear family. To this end, some calabai will undergo unofficial marriages (known as kahwin di bawah tangan, or marriage below the hand).

The calabai identity is seen as unavoidable, permanent, and given by God. Although this view has aided in the general tolerance of calabai in many parts of modern Bugis society, in some cases it also promotes the exclusion of calabai due to implications of pity and lack of individual agency. Additionally, they lack much of the spiritual significance associated with the bissu, and there is a corresponding drop in the amount of respect afforded to the calabai in comparison.

== Calalai ==
The calalai, are assigned female at birth but take on the roles of heterosexual men. Etymologically, calalai means 'false man'. They present themselves as men, hold masculine jobs and typically live with female partners to adopt children. Although they typically dress masculinely, many calalai include distinct indicators of a unique calalai identity in their style and do not dress entirely like oroané, such as by wearing an earring only in the right ear (compared to the left ear for oroané and both ears for makkunrai). The calalai are often expected to exhibit a mixture of feminine and masculine virtues, such as devotion and bravery, respectively. Similarly, calalai can perform both masculine and feminine behaviors, and there is a certain degree of fluidity in this expression depending on the occasion.

There is a considerably small number of calalai, even compared to the bissu and the calabai because many are disincentivized from identifying as calalai. There is generally a higher level of discrimination towards people assigned female at birth who forego becoming mothers and wives, and they are often stereotyped as lazy. Much of their work is also out of public view, such as in agriculture, compared to calabai who are often seen working as cooks, hairdressers and wedding planners, and these contrasts may contribute to this stereotype. In contrast to the calabai, who generally are more visible, many calalai who can pass as male are secretive about their biological sex.

In the 1990s, some calalai described themselves using the English words "tomboys," "lesbians," and "hunters," this last term referring to "hunting" the dream of being accepted as their preferred gender.

== See also ==
- Waria
- Māhū
- Fakafifine
- Faʻafafine
- Bakla
- Gender binary
- Third gender
- Two-spirit
