= Friends with benefits =

Sexual but not romantic relationship

A friends with benefits relationship (FWB or FWBR) is a sexual arrangement between friends that involves recurrent physical intimacy and varies in its formation, outcomes, and attributes. Such friendships may or may not develop into romantic relationships, depending on whether romantic feelings existed prior to, or emerged during, the FWB arrangement. FWB relationships are usually enjoyed over a longer period, with a degree of commitment to the FWB arrangement, which is in contrast to the fleeting nature commonly found in casual sexual encounters and other types of sexual relationships.

These relationships can be characterized into several different types, develop with different motivations, and may face certain challenges, including deceptive affection and third wave feminism related issues like women's sexual freedom and gender double standards. FWB relationships are present in other cultural communities and the LGBTQ community. Theoretical frameworks such as affection exchange theory, self-determination theory, and relational turbulence theory have also been applied to study friends with benefits relationships. The history behind the term "friends with benefits" can likely be traced to its use in popular media and music.

== Motivations, types, and challenges ==
=== Motivations ===
Research shows five different motivators for starting friends with benefits relationships:

1. Just sexuality (purely sexuality motivation)
2. Emotional connection (the desire for increased closeness and/or intimacy)
3. Relationship simplicity (wanting an easy, natural, and stress-free relationship)
4. Avoidance of a more serious relationship (purposeful avoidance of the exclusive and/or romantic elements)
5. Wanted an FWBR (couples who "...became single and took advantage of the opportunity").

The parties involved in FWB relationships enter it with the understanding that the relationship will end at some point in time. This differs from romantic relationships in that the unsaid goal of a romantic relationship is for both people involved to stay in the relationship long term.

However, as FWB relationships continue to evolve, individuals involved often have changing motivations for why they continue the FWB relationships. The motivation for many of these relationships is typically companionship.

=== Types of sexual relationships ===
Unlike more casual sexual relationships (i.e., sexting, one-night stands, and other brief sexual encounters), FWBs continue to have a sexual relationship and romance. Although seemingly similar, FWB relationships differ from casual sex relationships in that FWB relationships are a commitment to continuous casual sex. One-night stands are brief encounters with limited information exchanged; the parties involved typically part the next day without any additional communication. Booty calls are between people that are already acquainted, but not necessarily friends. Booty calls are usually recurring and do not develop into anything more. Sugaring involves exchanging gifts or money for companionship.

=== Types of friends with benefits relationships ===
Research identifies several types of friends with benefits relationships, including:

1. True friends – Close friends who engage in sexual activity with each other
2. Just sex – Interactions between them occur exclusively through sex
3. Network opportunism – Acquaintances within a shared social network that use each other for sex if they have no other options available
4. Successful (transition in) – Intentionally starting and using a FWB arrangement in hopes it will lead to a romantic relationship
5. Unintentional (transition in) – A romantic relationship develops despite neither partner having any prior intentions for it to do so
6. Failed (transition in) – One person tries to initiate a romantic relationship but fails to
7. Transition out – sexual interactions that occur between exes

Transition in relationships may attempt to use a FWBR to initiate a romantic, committed relationship, but differ in both outcome and intention. These seven types of FWBRs can be distinguished by the level of trust and closeness between the friends and whether romantic experiences happen while involved in a FWB arrangement.

=== Challenges with friends with benefits relationships ===
FWB relationships include friendship and sexual interactions without romance. Even with the rise in popularity in friends with benefits relationships, there is not a high success rate of continued friendship at the end of a friends with benefits relationship. Although these relationships are established to safely connect with a partner without the emotions, often these relationships are not genuine. However, perceptions of authenticity in FWB relationships can vary. The sexual interactions that happen in a FWB relationship, as opposed to casual sexual encounters, can feel more genuine for some friends due to pre-existing emotional closeness.

Research on deceptive affection, or expressing affection that does not reflect true feelings, shows that people often hide their honest feelings because of concern that they will not be mutual or well received. Deceptive affection ends up being used as a tool to protect personal feelings so that no one gets hurt. Ultimately, these relationships continue to be complex despite the attempt to be void of emotions, the lines become blurred and feelings are sometimes developed by one partner that are not always well received by the other.

== History ==
=== Terminology ===
Some researchers assign the origin of the term "friends with benefits" earliest known usage to Alanis Morissette's 1995 song "Head over Feet" in the lyrics, "You're my best friend, Best friend with benefits." However, others primarily believe it to have originated from the 2011 film known as Friends with Benefits.

=== Third wave feminism ===
As an evolution of second-wave feminism, third-wave feminism is the belief that "young women should not be inhibited either by traditional norms of sexuality that stigmatize female sexual experimentation in non-committed relationships, nor by a sense that one form of sexual practice is more "feminist" than another" (Williams & Jovanovic, 2014, p. 158). Third-wave feminism advocating for women to be able to freely explore their sexuality without consequences or judgment may manifest itself as a motivation for heterosexual women to engage in FWBRs. However, for some, feminism may also serve as a reason to avoid them given the dominant nature of peer pressure to participate in a FWBR on college campuses.

Third-wave feminists also reject the notion that young women engaging in casual sex, FWB relationships, or other expressions of sexual agency should be labeled as "sluts." This term can discourage these women from pursuing their sexual desires or gaining insight about their own sexuality.

However, the sexual double standard, or the societal perspective that criticizes women's sexual behavior more than men's, may not be as prominent for women engaging in a FWBR since these relationships are usually a more private affair. The privacy may shield women from facing judgement from others for their sexual expressions and assign them more power and control.

Arguments can be made by third wave feminists on both sides about the positives and negatives of FWB relationships. On one hand, FWB relationships allow women to explore their sexuality and desires in an affaire de coeur that can be considered "safe" due to the friendship accompanied in a FWBR, even if it is non-committal, giving them the space to communicate their needs. On the other hand, FWB relationships may not help women navigate the full extent of their sexual agency without exploitation. While there are benefits to FWBRs, the assumption that all women in a FWBR are sexually free with complete agency can be viewed as an oversimplification by feminists given the sexual double standard that may still influence their behavior and choices.

== Research and studies ==
There are many studies that examine how FWB relationships progress among college aged students.

In an era of increased sexual liberation, casual sexual relationships continue to become more prominent. Studies show that an increasing number of college students, both male and female, report having a friends with benefits relationship at some point. Men tend to view FWB relationships as casual, while women tend to view them as friendships. Men are also more likely to have sexual relations with someone that they are not in a romantic relationship with.

Themes that emerged from one study on FWB with university students included "(1) FWB relationships as empowering to young women, (2) FWB relationships as not empowering to young women, (3) FWB relationships as providing a safe option in place of hook-ups, and (4) control and power in FWB relationships."

Another study found that individuals who avoid attachment experience less sexual satisfaction in relationships. This study also found a correlation between attachment anxiety and sexual satisfaction.

As FWB relationships continue to be a topic of interest, research on the subject is starting to lose its negative connotation. FWB relationships continue to grow in popularity amongst young people and older people without young children.

Teenagers and young adults from rural communities revealed that most of them anticipated their FWBR to dissolve into a friendship and majority of the rest that didn't expected a romantic relationship to come out of being FWB. Both female and male youths motivated by their physical needs to engage in a FWB relationship were also more likely to express satisfaction with the experience.

Research on gender differences for FWBRs suggest that men are more likely to have more than one FWBR at a time and wish to maintain a FWB relationship as it is whereas women may expect to end up in a committed relationship or become closer friends.

Women also tend to motivate themselves to participate in a FWBR as means of meeting their emotional needs more than their male peers. However, complicated emotional feelings can still happen for both men and women in friends with benefits relationships. Since women face more societal judgment and pressures than men for casual sexual behavior, this may also increase their shame and make them less likely to take safe sex precautions to prevent STDs and unintended pregnancies.

=== Cultural perspectives ===
Among college students in Puerto Rico, Quiñones, Martínez-Taboas, Rodríguez-Gómez, and Pando (2017) found that young Latino men and women had all experienced at least one FWB relationship throughout their life and showcased interest into the low commitment, sexual nature of a FWBR. Contrary to other studies on gender differences in FWBRs, both Latino men and women were also found to care more about the sexual activity that happens in a FWBR as opposed to the emotional part of it.

The college students who exhibited strong religious beliefs were also less likely to participate in a FWB arrangement. This may be attributed to the Jewish-Christian tradition that posits that sexual activity can only occur when accompanied by romantic exclusivity and monogamy.

In Indonesian communities, through filling out identity forms as a self-disclosure method, FWBRs can be actively sought out through Telegram. Self-disclosure can affect these arrangements for members in ways such as:

1. Diving into the intimate details of others.
2. Building relationship security and comfort with each other.
3. Noticing incompatibility.

Members are bonded by self-disclosing and finding similarity in their main goal of having a willing partner to be in a friends with benefits relationship with.

Another study with young Norwegian heterosexual women found three additional types of FWB relationships:

1. Good friends (value the friendship more than the sex)
2. Lovers (value the sex more than the friendship)
3. On the hook (one has romantic interest but the other does not desire a committed relationship)

Norwegian women engaged in a FWBR to satisfy their physical and sexual desires, gain more experimental sexual experiences, or because they had no relationship responsibilities to the other person. The rules of their FWBRs primarily lacked explicitness, but the ones that did involved issues of public displays of affection and sexual exclusivity.

=== LGBTQ+ perspectives ===
While research is fairly limited when it comes to hearing LGBTQ+ perspectives on FWBRs, a recent 2024 study found that young LGBTQ+ college students may search for emotional closeness through the intimacy involved in hook-ups or FWBRs or wish to end up in fully committed romantic relationships through these interactions. They have also expressed using hook-ups to develop into FWBRs and are motivated to be in friends with benefits relationships to satisfy their physical and sexual needs. Some link their reasoning to using FWBRs due to their belief that the longevity of a previous relationship enables growth over time in sexual interactions. Along with that, gay men were found to be more likely to participate in hook-ups or booty calls whereas lesbian women were more likely to engage in a FWB relationship, however future studies would be needed to further confirm these results.

== Theories ==
=== Affection exchange theory ===
Affection exchange theory asserts that "individuals need to give and receive affection in order to survive and procreate". When individuals are a part of healthy relationships that allow them to show affection without question, they have less anxiety in other, more involved relationships. Some FWB relationships can withhold affection, whereas other FWB relationships can provide the opportunity for participants to give and receive affection, even though they may only see their relationship as "low-maintenance": Post-sex communication like pillow talk, cuddling, and kissing can have positive outcomes. When this affection does not happen, but is desired, individuals who desire affection and who are aware of a partner's longing for it can both harbor hostility.

Research shows that relationships (like some FWB relationships) that do not include healthy post-sex engagement can experience attachment avoidance due to lack of affectionate communication. In order for individuals to feel sexual satisfaction, it is important to understand the attachment needs of the parties involved in the sexual relationship.

=== Self-determination theory ===
Stein et al. (2019) claim that part of the allure of friends with benefits relationships ties into self-determination theory (SDT). SDT delves into the human need to continuously search for new challenges. So many people find FWB relationships attractive because of the allure of the easy-going non-committal relationship.

The root of SDT is the need to have goals that are either approach focused or avoidance focused. Approach-focused goals are centered on what an individual can gain from a relationship – in a FWB situation this necessarily includes sex. Avoidance-focused goals look at failures that can be avoided. In the case of FWB relationships, an individual can avoid a romantic relationship with a negative ending.

=== Relational turbulence theory ===
Relational turbulence theory seeks to clarify how individuals experiencing issues in their relationships think, feel, and communicate with their partner. In a study with university students, RTT was expanded upon to explain concepts of relational uncertainty, interdependence, emotions, avoidance of discussing the relationship, and feelings of satisfaction that can happen in FWB relationships.

Findings suggested satisfaction within a FWBR relied on people's perception of their FWB partner's feelings rather than their own. In other words, satisfaction was dependent on uncertainty regarding their partner's emotions. Interferences, or when one partner hinders the other, were also associated with negative feelings like stress or anger in FWBRs. FWB partners also participated in less talk about their relationship even when they endured less turmoil and more satisfaction with their relationship, which can likely be due to the casual, no-obligation nature of a FWBR.

== Portrayal in media ==
In 2011, the film Friends with Benefits, starring Justin Timberlake and Mila Kunis, depicted a friends with benefits relationship between the two lead characters. Within the same year, the film No Strings Attached, starring Natalie Portman and Ashton Kutcher, also depicted a friends with benefits relationship. (By coincidence, Kutcher and Kunis, actors in the above films, married in real life in 2015.)

== See also ==
- Friends with Benefits (TV series)
- Friends (With Benefits)
- "Friends with Benefits" (song)

== Terminology ==
- Back-up partner
- Fornication
- Group sex
- Open relationship
- Promiscuity
- Sociosexual orientation
- Casual relationship
- Forms of nonmonogamy
- Open marriage
- Casual sex
- Yes no maybe list
