= Casual dating =

Relationship without commitments

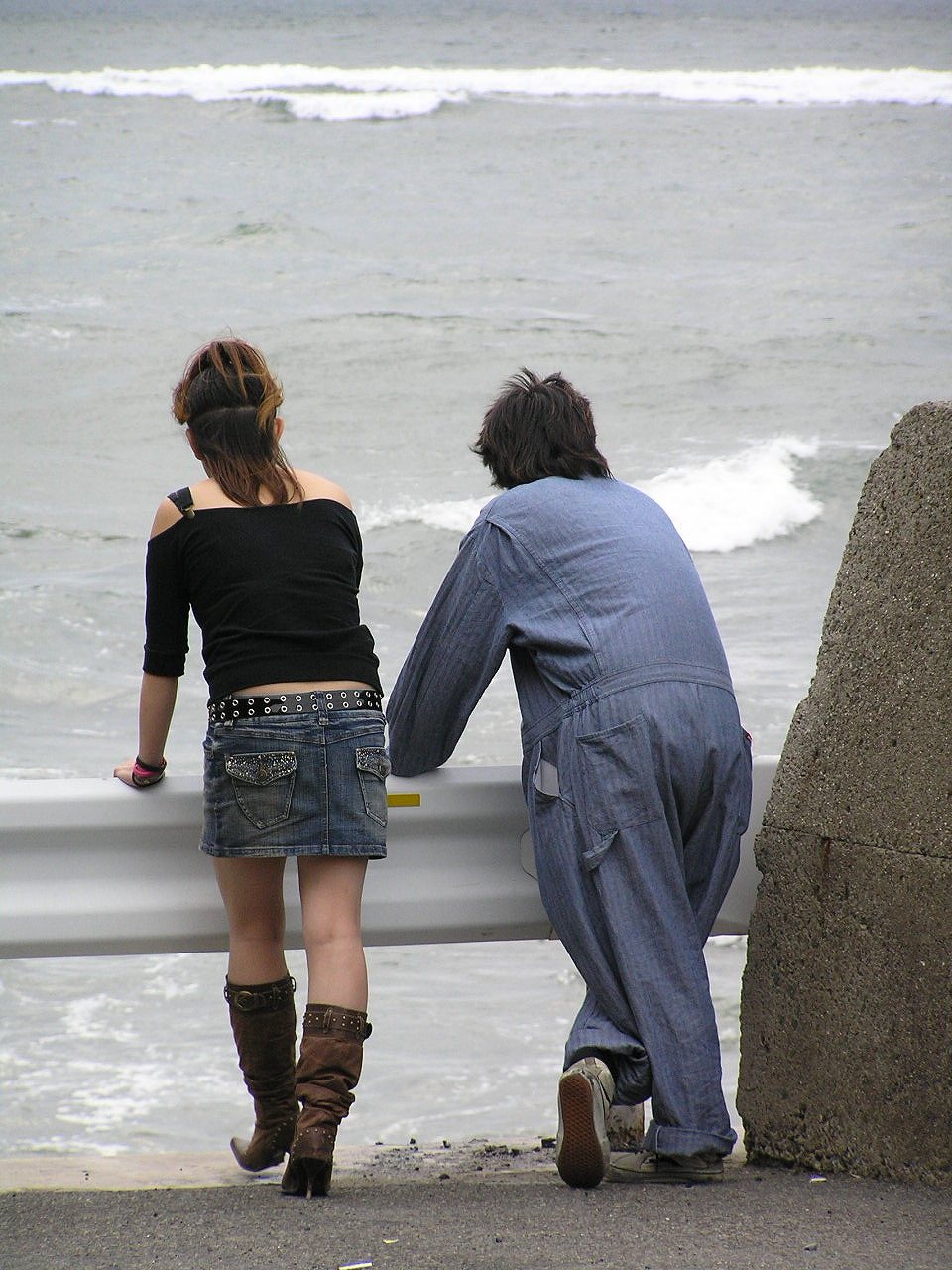
A casual relationship is sometimes referred to as a "no strings attached" relationship or as a situationship.

Casual dating or a casual relationship is a physical and emotional relationship between two people who may have casual sex or a near-sexual relationship while staying loyal to each other without necessarily demanding or expecting the additional commitments of a more formal romantic relationship. Motives for casual relationships vary. There are significant gender and cultural differences in acceptance of and breadth of casual relationships, as well as in regrets about action/inaction in those relationships.

Casual dating may or may not entail partner-exclusivity. In each case, the relationship's dominance in the lives of those involved is being voluntarily limited, and there is usually a sense that the relationship is intended to endure only so long as both parties wish it to. Casual relationships sometimes include mutual support, affection and enjoyment, which underpin other forms of loving relationship.

A casual relationship is sometimes referred to as a "no strings attached" relationship, as a situationship, or as a fling.

The term 'situationship' has become progressively common within modern dating culture, specifically surrounding young adults. Researchers depict situationships as romantic or sexual relationships that involve affection but lack clarity, labels, any kind of commitment, and high expectations.

== College students ==
A "no strings attached" relationship is most commonly found in young adults such as college students. The shift from childhood to adulthood brings on much exploration in different fields. One of these fields include relationships and sexual activity. Grello et al.'s study suggests that, in most cases, students who lost their virginity in high school did so in a romantic relationship. After experiencing sexual intercourse, many college students go on to have casual sex with either friends or peers they have been recently or newly acquainted with.

A casual relationship, unlike a romantic relationship, is difficult to ascribe norms, scripts, and expectations to. Rebecca Plante, an associate professor at Ithaca College who has specialized in research on casual relationships, says that this type of relationship can be beneficial, saying that casual relationships can establish a "healthy outlet for sexual needs and desires".

=== Types of college-aged lovers ===
J.A. Lee defined two main types of lovers for college aged young adults: "Eros" lovers who are passionate lovers, and "Ludas" or "Ludic" lovers, which are game-playing lovers. "Eros" lovers are lovers that immediately form a close connection. They fall in love with the physical appearance of another before considering other characteristics of the person. This type of lover also commits to casual sex relationships. Because physical appearance is the main reason for their attraction, it is difficult for a genuine romantic relationship to form. "Ludic" lovers look for the feeling of a conquest, and typically enter a relationship or hook-up with very little or no intentions of commitment. In most cases, they will have more than one sexually active partner at a given time. They also find it difficult to consider a serious relationship.

=== Negotiation between participants ===
Many casual relationships establish guidelines or a set of rules. The two participants in the relationship will reach an agreement about what each expects from the relationship. Another major concern is that one of the partners will develop romantic feelings for the other. Communication between the two partners is essential to making this type of relationship work and because the partners in the casual relationship are often friends beforehand, talking to one another is a much simpler task.

=== Relationship maintenance and student concerns ===
Casual relationships, being a mix between a friendship and a non-romantic sexual relationship, result in the partners facing many challenges in maintaining a working relationship. Based on the exchange theory, Hughes witnessed an individual dependency on either partner as the exchange of resources, knowledge, rewards, and costs of items, becomes more and more prominent. The partners may become dependent on advice the other partner gives, or the company they receive when being around one another. This may be a one-way street and one partner may not feel this way. Any partner that is not fully dependent upon the other typically controls the casual relationship. The dependent partner is more submissive to their dominant partner as they do not want the relationship to end. This allows the less dependent partner to be able to fix and maintain the relationship the way he/she wants it to be. They normally control when they meet up, when they have sex, and when they do things together.

=== Disclosure of casual relationship to peers ===
Hughes's study also revealed the four main categories of why partners participating in a casual relationship did not feel the need to tell their same sex friends about the relationship. The first category was that the partners did not feel that their same sex friends needed to know this information. The second category consisted of people wanting to keep the casual relationship a secret and did not want their same sex friends to know. The feeling of embarrassment was the third category. Many students said that they would feel ashamed or did not want to be judged by their same sex friends. The final category is students who did not want to tell their same sex friends because they would show disapproval of the relationship.

=== Motivations ===
Hughes's study suggests that there were five main motivations to why college students wanted to be in a casual relationship. The five main motivators are:

- Relationship avoidance: Students that liked multiple partners at once and wanted to avoid being tied down to one person.
- Sexual activity: Students find each other attractive and want to hook-up.
- Relationship simplicity: Students get the benefits of a relationship without all the drama.
- Emotional connection: Students miss the intimacy they used to have with ex relationships and want to experience it again with no strings attached.
- Always wanted a casual relationship: Two students that are single and want to take advantage of it together.

=== Gender participation ===
A traditional stereotype of heterosexual casual relationships in college is that the men initiate the sexual activity. Another stereotype is that men are more sexually active and women link sex with romance. This is not true all the time, especially in college students.

A study conducted by Paul and her team suggests that when it comes to gender participation, there are just as many women initiating these relationships. Pressure from friends and other social means may persuade college students to participate in a casual relationship or "hook-up" regardless of their gender.

Many casual dating sites have an unbalanced gender ratio, as they have much more men than women. Some of these sites are animating their male users to keep them interested or to lure them into paid subscriptions. Usually, these animated casual dating sites are stating this directly in their Terms of Service (as they could be sued otherwise for fraud). As most users do not read Terms of Service when they register on a new website, the animation stays hidden for most users.

=== Environmental factors ===
Alcohol consumption and parties often take place on college and university campuses. Promiscuity is also prevalent. Being placed in an environment of sexually active students can put pressure on other students to consume alcohol, become sexually active, and engage in casual dating. Colleges and universities known for a larger alcohol consumption by their students seem to also have a larger number of students participating in casual relationships. Researchers have struggled with the idea that the "perceived disinhibitory function" leads to the reason for increased sexual activity.

== Casual sex ==
Casual sex are certain types of sexual activity outside the context of a romantic relationship. Although individuals in a casual relationship may engage in casual sex, the former encompasses a range of activities not confined to the context of the latter.

In sexual relationships among teenagers in the U.S., it is common that penetrative sex is not the predominant sexual activity. Rather oral sex and manual sex are more common, as this reduces the risks associated with sexual promiscuity, such as pregnancy and sexually transmitted infections. Some teenagers do not view oral sex as "real sex" and use it to retain what they consider "technical" virginity.

A common aspect of casual sex is that sexual activity occurs within a relationship between two partners that have no commitment to one another. Casual sex presents itself as less risky than random sexual activity because of the person's prior knowledge of the partner they are engaging in sexual activity with. When participating in casual sex, a person may be more likely to know their partner (on a more personal level) than someone they just had a one-night stand with.

== See also ==
- Affair
- Emotional affair
- Friends with benefits relationships
- Non-monogamy
- On-again, off-again relationship
- Open relationship
- Platonic love
- Romantic friendship
- Sociosexual orientation
- Yes no maybe list
