= Hookup culture =

Overview of casual sex encounters without commitment

Hookup culture is the acceptance and encouragement of casual sexual encounters, including one-night stands and related activities, without necessarily including emotional intimacy, bonding or a committed relationship. It is generally associated with Western late adolescent sexuality and, in particular, United States college culture. The term hookup has an ambiguous definition because it can indicate kissing or any form of physical sexual activity between sexual partners. The term has been widely used in the U.S. since at least 2000. It has also been called nonrelationship sex, or sex without dating.

Most research on hookups has been focused on U.S. college students; however, hookups are not limited to college campuses. Adolescents and emerging adults engage in hookups for a variety of reasons, which may include from instant physical gratification, to fulfillment of emotional needs, to using it as a means of finding a long-term romantic partner. Media reaction to hookup culture has been often considered as a form of moral panic. The introduction of cell phones, mobile hookup apps and websites has modernized hookup culture, especially among gay men.

== History ==
The rise of hookups, a form of casual sex, has been described by evolutionary biologist Justin Garcia and others as a "cultural revolution" that had its beginnings in the 1920s. Historians D'Emilio and Freedman put the beginning of casual sex, including college hookups, further back in history, to the early 1800s, and explain the phenomenon as shaped by historical and cultural forces. Lisa Wade, a sociologist, documents that 19th-century white fraternity men often had what would be called hookup sex with prostitutes, poor women, and enslaved women (however, the latter is generally defined as rape). Homosexual men also engaged in hookup sex during the 1800s, meeting in spaces that were transient in nature, such as wharves and boarding houses. Since the 1920s, there has been a transition from an age of courtship to an era of hookup culture. Technological advancements, such as the automobile and movie theaters, brought young couples out of their parents' homes, and out from their watchful eyes, giving them more freedom and more opportunity to engage in casual sexual activity.

The sexual revolution of the 1960s brought a loosening of sexual morals which allowed for sex to become uncoupled from relationships and non-marital sex to become more socially acceptable.

Support for sexual freedom became increasingly popular as new ideas and beliefs evolved about the positive and negative aspects of engaging in sexual intercourse. It became more widely accepted that having sex was not necessarily always intended for reproduction, but rather had more emphasis on physical pleasure. This new outlook was influenced by several factors, including the eradication of 1930s censorship laws regarding sexually explicit content in media, and also a growing accessibility to birth control pills, condoms, and other forms of contraception. Before the 1960s, unmarried women were usually denied access to birth control since it was traditional for men and women to refrain from having sex until after marriage.

Feminism grew substantially in the 1960s, with supporters arguing that a woman should have complete control over her own body. Supporters of the feminist movement also argued that women should be able to "pursue" men in the same way men traditionally approached women, and made efforts to change the negative attitudes usually associated with women that decided to have sex before marriage.

Kathleen Bogle has stated that the growing acceptance of casual sex in the 1960s could also be attributed to a sharp rise in female student enrollment at colleges and universities. The number of women attending college in the United States in 1972 was three times larger than the number in 1960. With a greater number of females on campuses compared to males, women had to adjust to the sexual scripts outlined by men, which are based more on engaging in uncommitted sex rather than on developing relationships.

Some scholars, including Garcia and Freitas, have found that dating, while it has not disappeared, has decreased as the frequency of hookups have increased. By the mid-1990s, Freitas found that hookups were an accepted form of interactions among sexually active adults, especially those located on college campuses.

According to a review by Garcia, this is "an unprecedented time in the history of human sexuality." People are marrying and beginning families at ages later than previous generations while becoming sexually mature at an earlier age. As a result, Garcia and other scholars argue that young adults are able to reproduce physiologically but are not psychologically or socially ready to 'settle down' and begin a family.

These developmental shifts, Garcia's systematic review of the literature suggests, is one of the factors driving the increase in hookups, a "popular cultural change that has infiltrated the lives of emerging adults throughout the Western world." The review shows that hookups are becoming increasingly normative among young adults and adolescents in North America and have taken root throughout the Western world, which represents a notable shift in how casual sex is perceived and accepted.

Garcia and others have noted that the "past decade has witnessed an explosion in interest in the topic of hookups, both scientifically and in the popular media. Research on hookups is not seated within a singular disciplinary sphere; it sits at the crossroads of theoretical and empirical ideas drawn from a diverse range of fields, including psychology, anthropology, sociology, biology, medicine, and public health." However, research shows that COVID-19 has impacted hook-up culture by lowering the prevalence of casual sex. Difficulties in defining the term can lead to different perceptions of its prevalence. Hookup culture is vaguely defined due to a variety of perspectives taken on this subject relating to human sexuality. It is hard to make sense of hookup culture without understanding why it exists in society and why individuals participate in the culture.

According to Shannon T. Boodram, "hooking up is nothing more than settling; it is the microwaveable burrito of sex." Hooking up is engaged in for the instant gratification for sex, pleasure, a feeling of being loved, an emotional feeling of being adhered to, the thought of the potential of the hookup developing into something less casual, and many more reasons.

According to Kathleen Bogle, the phrase 'hooking up' is "a slang term" deemed unofficial and unpredictable due to the extended variation of its meaning. Many other slang terms for hooking up were and are still used such as "friends with benefits" and "booty call." Other terms for repeated acts of hooking up include, "casual sex" or "recreational sex," or defined as a relationship with "no strings attached."

== Behavioral norms ==
The definition of hooking up can vary depending on the person or on the age group. It can range from acts that involve kissing, oral sex, manual sex, or sexual intercourse. The term "hooking up," meaning an instance of casual sex, differs from hookup culture. A hookup is an act that involves sexual intimacy, claimed by many to be a sexually liberating act. On the other hand, hookup culture is thought to be oppressive and monolithic, with intimacy only occurring within a specific context. Jennifer Aubrey and Siobhan Smith have found that between genders there are minimal differences when it comes to behavior and frequency in hookups; on the other hand, women still face a harder social stigma, because their social status decreases with increased sexual partners, but men's social status increases with more sexual partners. There is also a difference between men and women when it comes to the reason to partake in casual sex. Men hook up to increase sexual experiences and to gain their manhood, but women tend to hook up with the hopes of it becoming a long-term relationship and to satisfy their partner. In a study conducted by Danielle M. Currier, she explores how the phrase "hooking up" conveys different meanings depending on whether a man or woman uses it when describing their sexual encounters; furthermore, Currier notes that men use "hooking up" to emphasize their masculinity and heterosexuality, but women use the phrase to preserve their femininity by being strategically ambiguous to downplay their sexual desires.

=== Gender roles ===
Both men and women participate in hookups, but Bogle notes that males and females often choose casual sex for different reasons. Researchers suggest men and women have distinct sexual scripts, ways in which cultural influences can affect an individual's sexual behaviors. Furthermore, society judges the sexual behaviors of men and women in a completely different manner. For men, sex is characterized as "central to male identity," and research suggests men tend to "prefer nonrelational sex." In contrast, women are viewed as "sexual objects" and are normally "sexually passive compared to men." Society typically admires or glorifies men who frequently engage in casual sex, but women are scrutinized or admonished for the same behaviors. For that reason, a woman's sexual script has more focus on finding some type of commitment or relationship. Additionally, women pursue relationships to "protect their reputation" in college, but men have more sexual freedom without the fear of reproach. Women risk being called "sluts" or being accused of "getting around too much" since society has historically identified that as inappropriate behavior for women. Men are not held to the same standards, particularly in high school and college. Men who engage in regular sexual activity are seen as successful individuals who are "players." In fact, men are rarely reprimanded for their sexual behavior unless they are practicing abstinence in which case their peers might say that they cannot "get any."

Researcher Donna Freitas challenges society's perceptions of the male sexual script. Through conversations and interviews with men on college campuses, she states that they expressed a need to "fit in" with other males to be successful. Men claim to hook up more because of peer expectations, rather than to meet their own desires. Men also say they cannot express disapproval for hookup culture the same way that women can without facing criticism from their peers. To summarize, women face several risks by participating in hook-up culture, but Freitas says "men risk gaining a reputation by not being a part of it."

However, both men and women let societal pressure influence their sexual behavior on college campuses. Pluralistic ignorance leads people to behave in alignment with beliefs that they attribute to their group although they are usually false, regardless of the individual's beliefs. Research done on a college campus found that men and women overestimate their same-gendered peers' comfort towards hookups and act in accordance with their perception of how their peers feel, rather than their own comfort level. Pluralistic ignorance is supported by the results that women felt moderate discomfort with intercourse during a hookup, but 32% still reported participating, and all women rated their peers' comfort higher than their own. The study found that men were more comfortable with all sexual behaviors discussed than women were. Researchers argue that both lead to negative consequences like sexual assault, especially for women.

=== Homosexuality ===
Stereotypes suggest most people believe that gay men are the most likely to engage in casual or uncommitted sex on a regular basis. Studies conclude that gay men participated in more frequent casual sex than individuals "across all genders, sexes, and sexual orientations comparison groups." Overall, hookup culture is understood to be most prominent within the gay community. Biologically speaking, sexual behavior is closely connected to someone's birth sex. Under that assumption, women are considered a "limiting factor in sexual encounters." Gay men do not have to question the sexual desires of other men like they would if a woman was involved in the scenario.

Additionally, society's early negative perspectives on homosexuality along with a lack of "regulation" in gay relationships may explain the higher rate of casual sex encounters among gay men. Certain perceptions of gay men like prejudice and homophobia adversely affected the overall mental health of gay men, and they were often forced to explore their sexual needs and desires in a discreet fashion.

More recent technology, such as dating websites and mobile apps, have also contributed to the current hookup tendencies observed in gay men. Apps like Grindr have further advanced the sexual scripts of homosexual men. Apps such as Taimi, Her and Zoe have advanced the sexual scripts for homosexual women. Other apps, like Tinder, Hinge or Bumble, have been created to follow a similar script for heterosexual individuals. Nevertheless, because casual hookups and anonymous sexual encounters have been classified as more prominent in homosexuals, apps like Tinder and Bumble still maintain a broader focus on more long-term goals like dating or relationships, especially when compared to apps like Grindr.

== Adolescents ==
Some North American surveys published in the mid-2000s have shown that upwards of 60% or 70% of sexually active teens reported having had uncommitted sex within the last year. That is more common among males than females. Among sexually experienced adolescents, 28% of males and 16% of females reported losing their virginity to either someone they have just met or to a friend who is not a dating partner.

Males are more likely than females to have several hookup partners at the same time and to hook up with someone they are not dating. For both genders, hookups are more likely to be with an ex-boyfriend, an ex-girlfriend, or a friend than an acquaintance. The majority of teens (68%) who hook up with a friend or an ex will hook up with them again.

About half of all hookups among adolescents were a one-time affair, and this is the same for both genders. Only 6% of teens have had sex with someone they just met, and those encounters are a one-time affair 75% of the time. Over all, 25% of those who had a sexual experience with a dating partner have also hooked up with someone they were not dating. Additionally, 40% of those who had hooked up with someone they were not dating had also hooked up with a dating partner in the previous 12 months.

Studies have shown that most high school girls are more interested in a relationship than high school boys, who are interested mostly in sex. Young women tend to be honest about their sexual encounters and experiences, and young men tend to lie more often about theirs. Another study shows that once a person has sex for their first time, it becomes less of an issue to future relationships or hookups. The study showed that girls in high school do not care as much as boys do about having sex in a relationship. On the contrary, girls will have sex with their partner to match them.

=== Relationships ===
For some adolescents, sex and relationships have been decoupled.

Some worry that if society disconnects intimate sexual behavior and emotional connection, teens who hookup will have trouble forming stable intimate relationships later in life.

Journalist Sabrina Weill asserts that "casual teen attitudes toward sex—particularly oral sex—reflect their confusion about what is normal behavior" and adds that they are facing an intimacy crisis that could haunt them in future relationships. "When teenagers fool around before they're ready or have a very casual attitude toward sex, they proceed toward adulthood with a lack of understanding about intimacy."

== College ==
Historical research documents that white male college students have a long history of engaging in hookup sex. Journals and letters from the 1800s demonstrate that wealthy young white male college students hooked up with prostitutes, with poor women, and with enslaved African American women.

Today, according to one study, more than 90% of American college students say their campus is characterized by a hookup culture, and students believe that about 85% of their classmates have hooked up. There have been several studies conducted that found men emerging into adulthood have a higher number of casual sex partners and will engage in more casual sex as opposed to women. It also seems that hooking up has replaced much of the dating scene on many U.S. college campuses, though men and women's definition of hookups varied. Studies show that most students (most recent data suggest between 60% and 80%) do have some sort of casual sex experience. Of those students who have hooked up, between 30% and 50% report that their hookups included sexual intercourse. In the U.S., women outnumber men in college enrollment by 4 to 3, leading some researchers to argue that the gender imbalance fosters a culture of hooking up because men, as the minority and limiting factor, hold more power in the sexual marketplace and use it to pursue their preference of casual sex over long-term relationships.

However, most students overestimate the number of hookups in which their peers engage. Only 20% of students regularly hook up. Roughly one half will occasionally hook up, and one-third of students do not hook up at all. The median number of college hookups reported by graduating seniors is seven, and the average college student acquires two new sexual partners during their college career. Half of all hookups are repeats, and 25% of students will graduate from college a virgin. African American female students are less likely to engage in hookup sex than white female students.

One study has found that the strongest predictor of hookup behavior was previous experience hooking up. Those who have engaged in hookups that involve penetrative sex are 600% more likely to hookup again during the same semester.

Subculture can affect gender roles and sexuality, and youth subcultures are particularly susceptible to peer pressure. Self-esteem is also an indicator: men with high self-esteem and women with low self-esteem are more likely to have multiple sexual partners, but hookups are less likely among both genders when they have high self-esteem. Most predictors among males and females rarely differ.

One third of gay and bisexual college men have met an anonymous sexual partner in a public place such as a park, bookstore, or restroom. Other venues such as public cruising areas, Internet cruising networks, and bathhouses are popular for gay men, but not for lesbians or heterosexuals.

The trend toward marrying later may be what is fueling the hookup scene on college campuses. At colleges, hookups are common between students at parties, in dormitories and fraternity houses, at surrounding bars and clubs, and at popular student vacation destinations. For example, a study of Canadian college students who planned to hookup while on spring break showed that 61% of men and 34% of women had sex within a day of meeting their partner.

Another study was based on a survey of over 18,000 college students from ages 18–25. This survey asked questions like how many sexual partners they have had since graduating high school, how many sexual partners per year, and how many times per week they have sex. It was reported that a little over 59% of college students have sex once per week. A little over 31% reported to having at least one sexual partner per year, and about 50% said that they have had more than two sexual partners since the age of 18. Perceptions of "frat boys" and how this stereotype seems to be the typical male who only pursues women to have sexual relations. Many female college students explained how the "frat boy" perfectly embodies the persona of a sex driven male.

=== Relationships ===
Hooking up generally refers to having sex; however, many others indicated that when they say hooking up they are referring to something less than intercourse. In a hookup culture, young people often have little experience with dating and developing romantic relationships. Hooking up is means for experiencing casual sexual encounters, but it is also a means for beginning relationships. Students often feel that hookups are the only option and that their peers do not date. This becomes a self-fulfilling prophecy as fewer students date because they believe their classmates do not believe in dating. Freitas' study has found that students on these campuses generally feel that the decision about whether or not to be in a relationship is out of their control and that "hookup culture dictated for them that there would be no dating and that they simply had to endure this reality."

Kimmel believes that while sexual promiscuity once existed on college campuses alongside more traditional forms of dating, hooking up is now "the alpha and omega of young adult romance." Wade, on the other hand, says that college students are merely engaging in a different form of courtship that often results in monogamous relationships. This view is echoed by Armstrong, Hamilton and England, who state that college students have not abandoned dating. Some students claim that hookups fit their busy personal and professional schedules better than traditional dating does and is thus liberating. Freitas counters that living in the hookup culture is not at all liberating if what students want is to actually go on dates.

Freitas has opined that a "hookup is a sexual act that thwarts meaning, purpose, and relationship." However, most students do want to be in a romantic relationship. One study has found that 63% of college-aged men and 83% of college-aged women would prefer a traditional romantic relationship at their current stage in life to casual sex. Additionally, 95% of women and 77% of men say they prefer dating to hooking up. "Without exception," sex counselor Ian Kerner says, "[students] discuss a long-term monogamous relationship as their desired end goal." While more than half of students of both genders say they would like a hookup to develop into a romantic relationship, only 6.5% (4.4% of men and 8.2% of women) expect that one will. 51% of women, and 42% of men, have tried discussing the possibility of beginning a romantic relationship with a hookup partner.

More than half of college relationships begin with a hookup, Bogle's research has found. Freitas' study shows that when a relationship is born of a hookup, it is usually after months of engaging in a series of sexual encounters. Relationships that begin as a hookup, or as a "friends with benefits" situation, report lower levels of satisfaction. Garcia says that hookup culture can lead to a lower incidence of dating among youth, but as people get a bit older they outgrow their desire for hookups and settle into traditional dating.

Oftentimes, men and women seem to not be on the "same page." According to Bogle, many males believed that females often invested themselves or had an ulterior motive for pursuing a hookup like situation. For instance, when a male student was asked if he felt that women looked for different components in a hookup; his response was that most females generally did not lean towards a "one and done" thing.

Sociologist Wade discusses several scholars who disagree that contemporary college students desire long-term monogamous relationships. She cites Elizabeth Armstrong and Laura Hamilton, Hanna Rosin, and Kate Taylor who posit that hookup culture is good for women as it frees them to focus on their studies and on their professional development for careers instead of seeking a long-term partner or marriage.

Freitas believes the lessons imparted by hookup culture have "set back" students who often have little experience dating, and few skills in asking a romantic partner out as a result. There has been such a decline in dating culture on college campuses that most students have had more hookups than first dates. On some campuses, dating is so rare that many students do not have the skills to know how to ask someone out. Boston College even offers a course on how to plan and execute a date.

== Peer culture ==
College students base their sexual ideas and sexual actions within a peer culture, where students who are peers are comparing and differing sexual situations in one's own life among one another to create a foundation for the current hookup culture. Kathleen Bogle describes the peer culture at universities as the "sexual arena." College students on campuses create and explore their own sexual beings in life by referencing others' intimacy, which tends to be presented publicly.

This peer culture is not reserved to college students, but it may start to develop around the time puberty starts in middle school for both genders around the age of eleven to fourteen years old. In general, puberty is a time that sexuality and self-awareness becomes a main focus for individuals to formulate this aspect of their identity. Once in college, for most students, the parental aspect is diminished, which leaves them feeling a high degree of freedom to truly explore and expand their whole personal identity, strongly including sexual identity in this "sexual arena."

According to Bogle, the campuses her studies were done at had a common trend of college students being strongly interested in every other student's private life. That awareness of all the happenings in other students' lives made the college scene an open door in looking at others' relationships and sexual intimacy. College is a highly public environment, and any kind of sexual activity or public display of affection at parties or on campus is exposed to others. The viewers of that activity process, interpret, and form assumptions about what was observed. Those types of sexual activity or public displays of affection could be as meaningless as two individuals romantically speaking to each other in a high-capacity location on campus or could be as extreme as two individuals walking into a bedroom together at a party.

The peer culture has evolved and escalated with access to rapid communication such as texting on cell phones and multiple social media applications. Most of those social media applications are identity profiles, public thought disposals, and virtual photo albums of oneself in which others' are just a click away from cyberanalysis of how that individual displays themselves physically, sexually, psychologically, emotionally, and mentally on the internet. Bogle states that the knowing of others' personal lives is not just a purpose to gossip, but a way to observe, analyze, and be impacted by other's sexual actions, solely for the purpose of their own actions. A peer culture is one in which norms surface because individuals begin to conduct themselves in the same manner as their peers, which creates the typical and common style of acquitting oneself.

== Risks ==
Most people choose to take part in hookups to experience physical intimacy and sexual pleasure, but that type of behavior can result in a variety of negative outcomes, too. The impacts can range from "emotional and psychological injury, sexual violence, sexually transmitted infections (STIs), and/or unintended pregnancy." Despite the known potential effects, many college students are either unaware or unbothered by those sexual risks. According to a survey focused on how students perceive the risk of contracting sexual diseases, only half of a group of 71 students reported having concerns about STI contraction while they engaged in sexual intercourse. Further analysis of the survey determined that many students claimed to trust their sexual partners and communities too much and that they were misinformed about sexual risks in general. Research suggests frequent drug or alcohol use can also lead to lower perceptions of those health risks.

Engaging in hook-ups can have negative effects on a person's mental health as well, including feelings of anxiety or discomfort. One study suggests that nearly 35% of surveyed students described feeling regretful or disappointed after a hookup. Experts have used qualitative analyses to gauge both the type and the level of regret that a student might have after uncommitted sex. Many reported having feelings of embarrassment, emotional issues, and an overall lack of respect from their peers.

Garcia's review has found that hookups can result in emotional and psychological injury, sexual violence, sexually transmitted infections, and/or unintended pregnancy. Most students report with not concerning themselves with or being concerned about the health risks that come with hookups, however, especially if their partner was a member of their own community, such as a student on the same college campus. Garcia notes that there can be much pressure when it comes to hooking up, which can contribute to discomfort, performance anxiety, and stress.^{[69]}

Some studies have found that students, both men and women, overwhelmingly regret their hookups. In one, 77% of students regretted their hookups, and in another, 78% of women and 72% of men who had uncommitted vaginal, anal, and/or oral sex regretted the experience. Intercourse that occurred less than 24 hours after meeting and those that took place only one time are the most likely to be regretted. Men were more likely to be sorry for having used another person, and women regretted the experience because they felt they had been used. While women usually felt worse after a hookup than men do, 39% of men expressed extreme regret, shame, and frustration with themselves about their hookup experiences.

Other studies found that many college students do not regret their hookup experiences. Wade interviewed many women and men who were enthusiastic about their hookup experiences. Vrangalova and Ong's study documented that students who had a stable personality orientation towards casual sex reported a heightened sense of well-being after experiencing casual sex. In Owen and Fincham's study, "Both men and women reported that their emotional reactions to hookups were more positive than negative". Fielder and Carey's study of hookups among female college students found that "participants enjoyed their most recent hookups ... and indicated a low level of regret".

Some research shows that hookup regret is gendered, with women tending to regret hooking up much more than men do. According to one study of 832 college students, 26% of women and 50% of men reported positive emotional reactions following a hookup, and 49% of women and 26% of men reported negative reactions following a hookup. According to one study, there are at least four explanations for why women may regret hookups more than men. They may have different attitudes towards relationships, hooking up, and sex; there may be differences in sexual initiation and agency within hookups; there may be differences in the frequency of orgasm within hookups; and there may be differences in perceived inequality in orgasms during hookups. Other studies, such as Vrangalova and Ong, found no gender difference.

Regret from hooking up may be linked to negative emotional outcomes, especially in women. According to an article by Steven E. Rhoads, Laura Webber, et al., "the more partners women have in the course of their lives, the more likely they are to be depressed, to cry almost every day, and to report relatively low satisfaction with their lives." In Premarital Sex in America: How Young Americans Meet, Mate, and Think About Marrying, Mark Regnerus and Jeremy Uecker report that having more sexual partners is associated with "poorer emotional states in women, but not in men."

The American Psychological Association also states that hookups can result in guilt and negative feelings. In a study of 169 sexually experienced men and women surveyed in singles' bars, when presented with the statement, "I feel guilty or would feel guilty about having sexual intercourse with someone I had just met," 32 percent of men and 72 percent of women agreed.

Students who reported to Freitas that they were profoundly upset about hooking up stated the encounters made them feel, among other things, used, miserable, disgusted, and duped. To avoid becoming a victim, experts believe "that the first step is to acknowledge the dangers inherent in the free-and-easy hookup approach to dating and sex." In one qualitative study, only 2% felt desirable or wanted after a hookup. More than a third, on the other hand, felt regretful or disappointed, and others reported feeling nervous or uncomfortable as well.

=== Drugs and alcohol ===
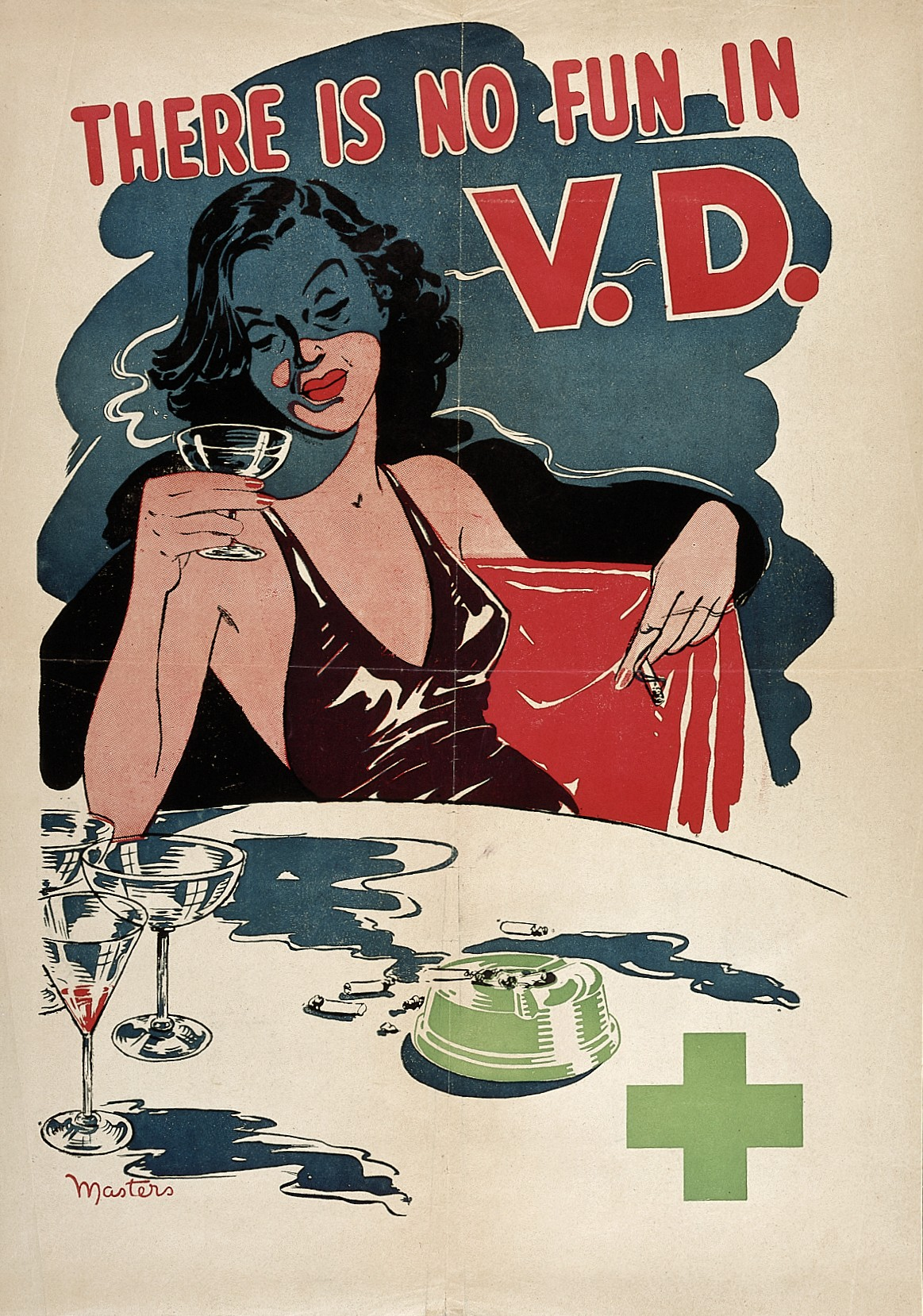
A poster that represents a warning against the risks posed by alcohol consumption, promiscuity, and venereal diseases.

Some studies have made a connection between hookup culture and substance use. Most students said that their hookups occurred after drinking alcohol. Frietas stated that in her study, the relationships between drinking and the party scene and between alcohol and hookup culture were "impossible to miss." Hookups "almost always" occur when at least one participant is drunk, according to Kimmel. On average, men have five drinks when they hook up and women three. Students who reported using marijuana or cocaine in the past year were also more likely than their peers to have hooked up during that period.

About a third of the students who reported engaging in vaginal, anal, or oral sex during a hookup reported being very intoxicated, and another third reported being mildly intoxicated. Alcohol may act as a cue regarding sexual availability, as a disinhibitor, and as a rationalization or an excuse for their behavior, poor sexual performance, premature ejaculation, and other sexual dysfunctions. It also is the "liquid courage," which allows them to make a sexual advance in the first place.

Studies suggest that the degree of alcoholic intoxication directly correlates with the level of risky behavior. In one study, 33% of those who had hooked up indicated that it was "unintentional" and likely from the influence of alcohol or other drugs. In a survey of first-year students, women said that 64% of their hookups came after drinking alcohol. Those results were similar to another study, which found that 61% of all undergraduates reported drinking alcohol before their last hookup.

Studies have generally shown that greater alcohol use is associated with more sexual activity over the course of a hookup. The students who reported consuming the least amount of alcohol were also the least likely to hookup. At the other end of the spectrum, the greatest alcohol consumption was associated with penetrative sex and less alcohol consumption with non-penetrative hookups. Of those who took part in a hookup that included vaginal, anal, or oral sex, 35% were very intoxicated, 27% were mildly intoxicated, 27% were sober, and 9% were extremely intoxicated.

==== "Dry dating" trend ====
A recent trend called "dry dating" is gaining popularity to replace "liquid courage", which involves going on dates without consuming alcohol.

== Wider culture ==
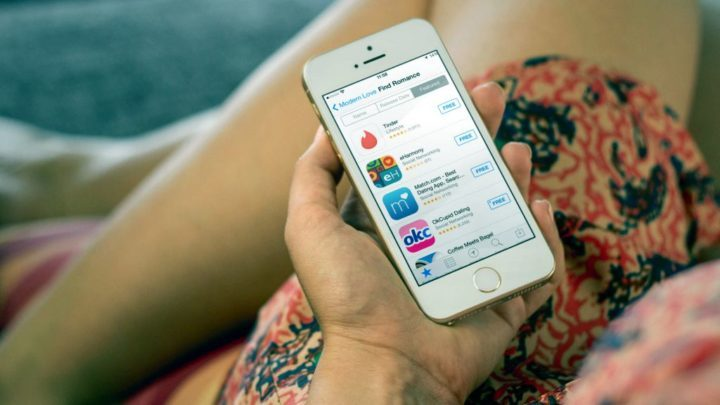
Mobile applications have become very popular in regards to online dating, but have also served as a way for people to engage in hook-ups.

Hookup culture on college campuses is intertwined with a broader society. On the other hand, some sociologists have argued that hookup culture is a characteristic of the American college environment and does not reflect broader American youth culture, just as many college graduates stop engaging in hookups when they leave college by preferring dating or other sexual arrangements. Others, including Michael Kimmel, have said that "the hookup culture can extend for years" beyond college, "well into their thirties and even their forties." Baby boomer fears of hookup culture have been termed a "moral panic." Until recently, those who studied the rise of hookup culture generally assumed that it was driven by men and that women were reluctant participants, who were more interested in romance than casual sexual encounters. However, evidence exists that young women are propelling it too.

Hookup culture also exists outside of the college environment. Location-based geosocial networking smartphone applications, also known as hookup apps or dating apps, are increasingly being used to locate potential hookups. Men who have sex with men (MSM) commonly use mobile dating apps designed for the gay male market such as Grindr, Jack'd, and SCRUFF to find hookup partners. One study noted that gay men's increased use of mobile hookup apps has eroded gay public life, especially for those gay men who are on the urban margins in terms of social class and generation. Hookup apps designed for heterosexuals emerged after the gay-oriented Grindr; Tinder, for example, was introduced in 2013. There have been a variety of dating apps for women who identify as lesbian, but they have been criticized for merely being "reskins" of successful hookup apps for gay men. Daatch is described as one of the few successful hookup apps designed for lesbians.

Life course studies indicate that as people grow older and subjectively identify as adult, they are less likely to engage in casual sexual behavior. However, social scientists recognize that there is little scientific research on older people's sex lives and so no definitive conclusions may be drawn.

=== Media ===
The American Academy of Pediatrics argues that media representations of sexuality may influence teen sexual behavior, a view that is supported by a number of studies. Some studies suggest that teens who watch movies with more sexual content tend to become sexually active at an earlier age and to engage in riskier sexual behaviors. The idea is that the media may serve as a "super peer" for youth, who then seek to develop a sexual identity that is in line with popular portrayals. On the other side, conservatives opposed to hookup culture have sparked controversy and come under criticism.

Cable television is filled with reality shows that depict an image of partying and glorified hookups, one of the most well known shows being MTV's Jersey Shore. Studies have found that about 35% of sexual behavior on cable television is with people "who are not in established committed relationships." In television, sexual monogamy differs by gender, which suggests men stray away from commitment, and women desire it. That further suggesting that masculinity is equal to sex and possibly leads male viewers to be more accepting of hookup culture.

As the cost of personal computers dropped and online access has increased, Heldman and Wade, along with others, argue that internet pornography has "emerged as a primary influence on young people's, especially men's, attitudes towards sex and their own sexuality." Heldman and Wade believe that the increase of access to pornography via the internet is what "spurred" hookup culture, in part by challenging the idea that "good sex" takes place in a monogamous relationship. Feminist Gail Dines has opined that pornography is "a cultural force that is shaping the sexual attitudes of an entire generation" and a "major form of sex ed today for boys."

=== Extra effects and causes ===
There are many ideas as to why people think young adults are involved in hookup culture, such as that they feel like they have to do it to fit in. Some girls also reported that the main reason that they are involved with random hookups is because they think that is what boys want. The feeling of being wanted by a cute guy is what they want and hookups are how girls think that they can get that attention. However, many boys and girls reported that they do hookup with random people to find someone with whom they could possibly start something serious. That being said, not all young adults are hooking up with each other to fit the college norm and gain sexual pleasure, but some truly want to find someone with whom they have a serious connection. There was a study by University of Louisville researchers Owen and Fincham, who asked 500 undergraduate students that have been involved in hookup culture how they felt about commitment. About 45% of men and 65% of women said they wanted their hookups to possibly end up in a serious relationship.

There have also been a number of studies that have studied the mental aspects of casual hookups. A study done by psychologist Seth Schwartz has shown results that people who had many random hookups had more psychological issues. For instance, students in college that had stated they were involved in casual sex had higher levels of depression and anxiety and lower levels of self-esteem, happiness and life satisfaction compared to the students who did not engage in a casual hookup in the past thirty days. There was then a study of about 400 young adults that felt lonely and depressed and adults who had less feeling of loneliness and depression who were involved in sexual intercourse. They then researched what emotional affects being involved in sexual intercourse hookups had on them. They came up with results that showed that penetrative sex hookups made people with greater feelings of depression and loneliness have a decrease in those symptoms and feelings. People who expressed fewer symptoms of loneliness and depression had an increase in those feelings after a penetrative sex hookup. It makes people feel depressed but also uncomfortable. For example, a study by Reiber and Garcia in 2010 show that many people who engage in sexual hookups feel uncomfortable. They also concluded that 78% of people in a hookup overestimate how comfortable their partner is doing certain things during their sexual engagement. Random hookups also have shown to cause feelings of pressure and performance anxiety in a study by Paul, et al.

The continuation of the sexual double standard between men and women may be due to the motivations behind men's and women's hook ups. The sexual marketplace makes it seem that women hold all of the power, but most women report engaging in casual sex to satisfy their partners and increase the possibility of it turning into a long-term, monogamous relationship in which men use casual sex to increase their sexual experience and explore themselves before they are tied down by marriage.

Total number of sexual partners among U.S. young adults
	1988–1996	2004–2012
0	10%	15%
1	23%	23%
2	16%	13%
3–5	23%	24%
6–12	20%	17%
13–20	5%	5%
≥21	4%	3%

== Communication theory ==
The majority of academic research about hookup culture focuses on the psychological, biological, and societal influences on an individual's inclination to engage in uncommitted sex, but some scholars have examined theories of communication and how they relate to hook-up culture.

=== Attachment theory ===
The premise behind John Bowlby's attachment theory is to "describe the behaviors that humans use to relate to one another." Attachment theory suggests people develop an attachment style during childhood and then carry it into adulthood, where it can have impacts on the relationships they form. Researcher Mary Ainsworth identified different attachment styles and suggested that they can influence someone's relational and sexual behavior. In one analysis, these attachment styles were applied to explain how homosexual men behave sexually. For example, gay men with an anxious-ambivalent attachment style (an individual made uncomfortable by "close emotional relationships, but will desperately try to seek out reassurance from another person") might be more reluctant to use condoms during sexual intercourse because they believe that will make them feel more wanted by their partner. Meanwhile, a gay man with an anxious-avoidant attachment style (an individual who does not like to get close to others) will most likely try to remain disconnected from his partner for fear of becoming too close or intimate.

=== Sexual script theory ===
How cultural norms affects someone's sexual habits and behavior is defined as sexual script theory. Researchers John Gagnon and William Simon originally developed the concept and suggested these scripts serve as "guides for behavior." The scripts can help individuals determine what is and is not appropriate based on surrounding cultural influences. In the United States, the script includes "kissing, then sexual touching, and ultimately culminates in sexual intercourse (i.e., the 'bases')." The sexual scripts also help define gender roles and explain the actions that both males and females take in hookups and uncommitted sexual encounters.

Casual sexual scripts have emerged as a subset of traditional sexual scripts. The traditional dating script follows a formal pattern and heteronormative gender roles. The casual script is perceived as less formal and lacks clarity.

Hookups seem to offer a chance to break away from normative dating patterns. Research on friends with benefits relationships contradicts this perception. Some women seek to flip the gender scripts and behave as a powerful man might with casual relationships. They suppress their emotions and in turn feel a lack of power and control. Reverting to characteristics of traditional sexual scripts, women may find themselves further entrenched in unwanted gender roles.

Mediated sexual scripts portray two different narratives for men and women. The male script portrays sex as uncomplicated, fun, and expected. The female sexual script emphasizes the need for caution and expectation of criticism. When viewed, the mediated scripts encode into personal sexual script and influence behavior. The results of a study looking at first-year college students supported that claim. Male students were likely to endorse or take part in hookup culture if they had viewed such scripts.

=== Cultivation theory ===
The concept of cultivation theory suggests "media influence people indirectly." Researchers suggest that how media portray sexual activity of different age groups is disproportionate to reality. Someone who consumes a variety of media will demonstrate such influences when they are confronted with hookups or uncommitted sexual scenarios.

== Research ==
Most research regarding hookup culture has been reliant on conducting interviews and surveys with sexually active individuals, particularly those at a high school or college level. Each investigator's set of questions, however, has served a different purpose in the overall analysis of hookup culture.

=== Research to explain a "hookup" ===
Scholars have expressed the difficulty of defining a "hookup" since it has different meanings, based on cultural norms and personal preferences. Researchers like Kathleen Bogle and Donna Freitas have interviewed males and females, both separately and together, to gain a better understanding of the hookup culture on campuses in the United States. Their studies have focused on how the growing hookup culture has shaped the trajectory of dating and forming relationships, and they have also aimed to gain a better understanding of the difference in sexual scripts between men and women. They have also used this data to help further explain what specific actions and behaviors constitute a hookup.

=== Influences of dating sites and apps ===
Another avenue of research has studied the influences of dating websites and mobile dating apps on hookup culture. Scholar Carey Noland suggests the advent of finding hookups or dates through the Internet has made talking about sex easier because of the possibility to "skip the small talk" and not needing to worry about the normal "barriers" of saving face by talking to someone online. Additional research has analyzed hookup patterns to see how mobile app developers have catered to their potential users. For example, the creators of Grindr capitalized on the increased sexual desires among gay men to base its app on locational awareness. That paved the way for apps in which users can find connections and meet up with people, who are often right around the corner.

=== Understanding the risks ===
Research conducted on hook-up culture has also been applied to scientific studies about sexually transmitted infections. Knowing more information about a man's or a woman's behavior during casual sex has increased the understanding of how STIs are contracted, whether it is through oral sex or sexual intercourse and how frequently or infrequently individuals take steps to prevent them. By interviewing individuals who engage in hookups, scholars have been able to better address health risk perceptions or the lack thereof. Researchers have also applied their findings to study the potential psychological effects of hookups, including feelings of depression or regret.

=== Effect on future relationships ===
According to a 2004 peer-reviewed study published in the Journal of Marriage and Family found that women who have more than one premarital sexual relationship have a higher likelihood in the long run of disruptions if ever married, with this effect being the "strongest for women who have multiple premarital coresidential unions". Kahn and London (1991) found that premarital sex and divorce are positively correlated. According to a 2014 report, couples that began as hook-ups tended to have lower marital quality than couples who had not begun as a hook up.

=== Areas for future research ===
Experts have suggested several areas for future research, including additional studies about how members of the LGBTQ community are impacted and have been affected by hookup culture. Researcher Kathleen Bogle highlights another area of study; she says a new focus should be on individuals who choose not to participate in hookups and how they are "affected by the dominant hookup culture that surrounds them." Finally, a third avenue for future research could include an analytical view of individuals who use apps like Grindr or Tinder with hopes of finding connections or developing relationships, rather than using them for the more common use of casual hookups.

== Critique ==
Several scholars have critiqued how outside influences have shaped or contributed to hookup culture as a whole.

Many ideas and beliefs about the growing hookup culture suggest that the act of engaging in uncommitted sex is found primarily among teenagers or college students. Teenagers and college students may be sexually active, but it is important to understand that other age and social groups take part in casual sex too. One of the reasons for that disconnect is the misrepresentation of sexual activity among certain age groups in media. In television, teens are most commonly shown to be sexually active, and it is rare to see any kind of sexual activity portrayed for individuals aged 65 or older. Further research shows, however, that that is opposite of the actual sexual activity reported among those age groups.

The stereotypes and different sexual scripts of males and females in hookups have also been influenced greatly by different media like movies, television, and pornography. In the media, women are frequently depicted as "sexual objects" and men portrayed as "there to objectify them."

On another note, scholars suggest the reality of emotional risks associated with hooking up can be linked to a lack of conversation or discussion about them. When discussing sex with adolescents, both parents and sex education programs tend to focus on the health risks, like STIs and pregnancy, but the exchanges rarely highlight the "emotions that occur from sexual experiences." The conversations seldom present information about motives for engaging in sex aside from reproduction and rarely acknowledge the positive emotions associated with that type of activity like physical pleasure. The imbalance of information regarding sexual behavior and activity has also contributed to the sexual scripts that are seen in hookup culture today.

== See also ==
- Going steady
- Seduction community

== Sources ==
- Bogle, K. A. (2007). "The Shift from Dating to Hooking Up in College: What Scholars Have Missed". Sociology Compass. 1 (2): 775–788. doi:10.1111/j.1751-9020.2007.00031.x.
- Bogle, Kathleen A. (2008). Hooking Up: Sex, Dating, and Relationships on Campus. New York: New York University Press. ISBN 978-0814799697.
- Freitas, Donna (2013). The End of Sex: How Hookup Culture is Leaving a Generation Unhappy, Sexually Unfulfilled, and Confused About Intimacy. New York: Basic Books. ISBN 978-0-465-00215-3.
- Kimmel, Michael (2008). Guyland. New York: Harper. ISBN 978-0-06-083134-9.
- Sax, Leonard (2005). Why Gender Matters. Doubleday. ISBN 9780385510738.
