= Casual sex =

Certain types of human sexual activity as alternative to a romantic relationship

Casual sex is sexual activity that is an alternative to a romantic relationship and implies an absence of commitment, emotional attachment, or familiarity between sexual partners. Examples are sexual activity while casually dating, one-night stands, prostitution or swinging and friends with benefits relationships.

== Practices ==
=== Single encounters ===
A one-night stand is a single sexual encounter between individuals, where at least one of the parties has no immediate intention or expectation of establishing a longer-term sexual or romantic relationship. Anonymous sex is a form of one-night stand or casual sex between people who have very little or no history with each other, often engaging in sexual activity on the same day of their meeting and usually never seeing each other again afterwards.

=== Social sex ===
The terms friends with benefits and booty call describe situations in which a person has sex with someone they generally consider a friend or someone they are fairly close to. They are not in an exclusive romantic relationship. The involved parties may have a degree of emotional attachment but do not want, for whatever reason, to have "strings attached".

A 2011 study, published in The Journal of Sex Research, found that two out of five single women and one out of five single men in "friends with benefits" relationships hoped that their relationship would eventually turn into a full-fledged romance. This stands in contrast to swinger couples, who are already in long-term relationships and are only seeking compatible friends with whom they can engage in recreational sex.

Recreational sex can take place in an open marriage, among swingers (where sex is viewed as a social occasion), or in an open relationship.

=== Hooking up ===
A "hookup" (colloquial American English) is a casual sexual encounter involving physical pleasure without necessarily including emotional bonding or long-term commitment. It can range from kissing (for example, making out) to other sexual activities. The practice of hooking up became widespread among young people in the 1980s and 1990s. Researchers say that what differentiates hooking up from casual sex in previous generations of young people is the "virtual disappearance" of dating, which had been dominant from the postwar period onwards. In more modern times, rather than dating, casual sex is the primary path for young people into a relationship. With the use of apps becoming more common it has become easier to hook up or meet others for sexual activity.

With students, studies have shown that the group most likely to engage in casual sex is white middle- or upper-class heterosexuals. Black and Latino students are less likely to hook up, as are evangelical Christian students and working-class students. Data on gay and lesbian students show mixed results, as some research shows that they engage in hookups at the same rate as heterosexual students, while others suggest that it occurs less frequently because college parties are not always gay-friendly, as most hookups occur at such gatherings.

A study of hookup culture at the University of Iowa found that waiting to have sex does not contribute to a stronger future relationship. Instead, what mattered most was the goal individuals had going into a relationship. Individuals who started by hooking up tended to develop a full relationship later if that was their goal going in. Another survey revealed that the number of first dates that most college-aged students have been on is about half of the number of hookups that they have had. It has become a common dating practice for people to candidly talk about their casual sex encounters and personal views on the subject as early as the first date or meeting. Another study showed that condoms were used in only 69 out of every 100 penetrative sex hookups.

=== Swinging ===
Swingers engage in casual sex with others for a variety of reasons. For many, an advantage is the increased quality, quantity and frequency of sex. Some swingers engage in casual sex to add variety to their otherwise conventional sex lives or for curiosity. Swingers who engage in casual sex maintain that sex among swingers is often more deliberative and therefore more honest than infidelity. Some couples see swinging as a healthy outlet and a means to strengthen their relationship. Others regard such activities as merely social and recreational interaction with others. A swinger party or partner-swapping party is a gathering at which individuals or couples in a committed relationship can engage in sexual activities with others as a recreational or social activity. Swinging can take place in various contexts, ranging from a spontaneous sexual activity at an informal social gathering of friends to a regular social gathering in a sex club (or swinger club), private residence, or other pre-arranged location such as a hotel, a resort, or a cruise ship.

== History ==
=== 1920s ===
As automobile ownership boomed along with the number of options for dating venues, such as movie theaters and jazz halls, parental involvement in the courtship process began to decrease. Casual encounters became a more common occurrence in the teen and young adult dating experience.

Religious and moralist views from the preceding decades also led to public outcry in communities and in the press, and a questioning of what was perceived as changing standards in morality among the younger generation.

Some historians suggest that sexual liberation in the 1920s was largely the product of cultural changes and evolving gender roles. More young women sought to enter college and the workplace; many left parental homes and bad marriages behind and sought independence. The automobile was more of a new, convenient means to enable coupling than a causal phenomenon.

Also, young adults of the 1920s considered Victorian-era sexual and moral codes to be oppressive; Bohemianism continued to influence and be embraced by this generation following WWI, and the liberated flapper and vamp emerged as lifestyle personas in popular culture. In the United States, "petting parties", in which petting ("making out" or foreplay) was the main attraction, became a part of the flapper lifestyle.

The emerging movie industry, through the Pre-Code Hollywood era, furthered the rebellion against Victorian-era morals as films started depicting women owning their sexuality. Current cinema from the 1960s onward has continued this trend.

=== Sexual revolution ===
During the sexual revolution in the United States and Europe during the 1960s and 1970s, social attitudes to sexual issues underwent considerable changes. The advent of "the pill" and other forms of birth control, the Women's Liberation movement, and the legalization of abortion in many countries are believed to have led to a wider practice of casual sex. That is also due in part to the younger generation's rejection of their parents' dating and matrimonial ideals and the rise of college party culture. In response to that insurgence in the 1960s, single women were denied access to birth control pills by their healthcare providers. That type of pushback is consistently observed throughout studies of the evolution of American sexual morals and beliefs. Younger generations are encouraged by their elders to engage in sexual activity only if it is within the bounds of marriage and for procreative purposes.

=== Contemporary ===
In the United States, one-time sexual encounters among college-aged students are growing increasingly common; nearly 70% of people in that age group have partaken in casual sex at least once because of their newfound adult identities and freedom to explore their sexualities.

Data from 2007 to 2017 indicates that there has been a decline in casual sex among young adults. A 2021 study attributed the decline to reduced alcohol consumption, increased video gaming, and a larger share of young adults living with their parents.

== Prevalence and norms ==
A study in 2019 found that 23% to 33% of women surveyed on Amazon Mechanical Turk dated men for a free meal termed "foodie call". Higher women to men sex ratio was found to increase casual sex.

=== Colleges ===
Research suggests that as many as two thirds to three quarters of American students have casual sex at least once during college. On college campuses, casual sex may occur almost anywhere. The majority of hookups happen at parties. Other common casual sex venues are dorms, frat houses, bars, dance clubs, cars, and public places or wherever is available at the time.

Collegiate holidays and vacations, especially spring breaks, are times that undergraduates are more likely to purposely seek out casual sexual encounters and experiment with risky behaviors. This is due to the availability of alcohol and uninhibitedness of spring break venues. One study reported that about 30% of collegiate spring breakers, whether they are in a monogamous relationship or not, have penetrative sex with a person they meet during their break. A 1995 study of Canadian students who had traveled to Florida for spring break, found the key elements of a spring break vacation to include a group holiday with friends traveling and rooming together, a perpetual party atmosphere, high alcohol consumption, sexually suggestive contests and displays, and the perception that casual sex is common. Overall, there was a perception that sexual norms are far more permissive on spring break vacation than at home, providing an atmosphere of greater sexual freedom and the opportunity for engaging in new sexual experiences. Of the 681 students who completed a questionnaire after the break, 15% of males and 13% of females had engaged in casual sex during the break. Nearly 61% of men and 34% of women who had casual sex over the break had slept together within 24 hours of meeting.

=== "Hookup" norms ===
Men and women are found to engage in very similar casual sex conducts, despite popular social beliefs. Most young adults in this age group believe that their peers are having a higher frequency of casual sex than they actually are, and this is due to vocabulary choice. For example, using the term "hookup" denotes that the sexual activity, whether it is vaginal sex, oral sex, or manual sex, is casual and between unfamiliar partners. However, it is vague and does not detail what specific sexual activities occurred. This is especially distorting towards others' impressions because 98% of college hookups involve kissing, 81% of hookups involve more than kissing, and only 34% of hookups involve penetrative sex. Studies have also linked this common misperception of peer hookup activity to media and pop culture portrayals of casual sexual encounters. Television and movies project distorted depictions of casual sex because they also commonly portray people who have just hooked up as emotionally satisfied and physically pleasured while simultaneously emotionally detached, which is not always the case. According to a 2004 peer-reviewed study published in the Journal of Marriage and Family, women who have more than one premarital sexual relationship have a higher likelihood in the long run of disruptions if ever married, with this effect being the "strongest for women who have multiple premarital coresidential unions". Kahn and London (1991) found that premarital sex and divorce are positively correlated.

=== Gender differences ===
According to more recent research, socialization, stigma, and cultural expectations, rather than just biological sex, are the main causes of gender disparities in casual sex. It is suggested that women are more vulnerable to social and reputational consequences, such as "slut-shaming" or judgment, which may affect their self-reported comfort level or desire in casual sex. Men, on the other hand, frequently experience fewer social repercussions and tend to be accepted by their peers for having casual sex.

In some studies, men are more likely to report good emotions like pride or satisfaction after casual sex, but women tend to report higher levels of regret or sadness. However, if women express their own motivation, explicit consent, or open communication, these patterns tend to disappear, indicating that context, rather than gender, is a major factor in determining emotional reactions.

Research also finds gender disparities in consent negotiation and perceived sexual safety. In casual sexual situations, women are more likely to express concerns about physical safety and STI risk, whereas men are more likely to express concerns about rejection and performance expectations. In heterosexual casual interactions, women are also more likely to assume responsibility for sexual health practices like contraception.

Despite these trends, a number of studies show that gender inequalities are less noticeable among younger generations and among LGBTQ+ communities. Men and women report about equal levels of happiness and satisfaction in casual sexual encounters when there is less social stigma associated with casual sex and open communication with partners.

Compared to women, men have a greater interest in casual sex. On average, men express a greater desire for a variety of sex partners, let less time elapse before seeking sex, lower their standards dramatically when pursuing short-term mating, have more sexual fantasies and more fantasies involving a variety of sex partners, report having a higher sex drive, find cues to sexual exploitability to be attractive for short-term mating, experience more sexual regret over missed sexual opportunities, have a larger number of extramarital affairs and are more likely to seek hookups and friends with benefits, and visit prostitutes more often. This has been often attributed to safety and social concerns when it comes to casual sex for women, and differences disappear when risk is accounted for and pleasure is guaranteed.

== Health and public health considerations ==
Casual sex can pose possible health risks, such as STIs and pregnancy. Public health guidelines stress the importance of barrier protection, frequent STI testing, and clear communication with partners regarding sexual health and consent.

Alcohol and drug use can raise the risk of unprotected sex or unclear consent, thus increasing health and safety risks. Research also suggests that casual sex taking place with open communication is less risky than casual sex happening impulsively or as a result of social pressures.

== Legal and religious issues ==
Attitudes to casual sex range from conservative and religious views, the extreme of which may result in imprisonment or even capital punishment for sexual relations outside heterosexual marriage, to liberal (libertarian or libertine) views, the extreme of which is free love.

=== Legal ===
The legality of adultery and prostitution varies around the world. In some countries there are laws which prohibit or restrict casual sex.

In some Muslim-majority countries, such as Saudi Arabia, Pakistan, Afghanistan, Iran, Kuwait, Malaysia, Morocco, Oman, Mauritania, United Arab Emirates, Sudan, South Sudan, and Yemen, any form of sexual activity outside marriage is illegal.

=== Religious views ===
In many civilizations, attitudes, actions, and social norms around casual sex are greatly influenced by religious beliefs. The teachings of the majority of major religions, such as Buddhism, Christianity, Islam, Judaism, and Hinduism, promote sexual restraint, value sex in the context of committed or long-term relationships, and oppose premarital or non-committed sexual behavior. Compared to nonreligious or less observant people, those who strongly connect with these traditions frequently express more restrictive sexual views and a reduced likelihood of having casual sex.

Even after adjusting for demographic factors like age, sex, and education, it is evident from these data that religiosity is one of the best indicators of sexual conservatism. A decline in hookups, one-night stands, and casual relationships is explained by increased religious participation—that is, the frequency of service attendance or involvement within religious communities. Studies reveal that decisions about sexual behavior may also be influenced by internalized religious ideals, such as beliefs about morality, purity, and divine responsibility.

Religions also have an impact on community expectations and social norms that have an impact on sexual conduct. If members of conservative religious groups have casual sex, they could face social repercussions, moral censure, or reputational damage. Women are likely to experience these consequences more severely than men. Both self-reported behavior and actual casual sexual interactions practices are impacted by these standards. Religious traditions that are more liberal or progressive may have permissive or contextual perspectives on sexual morality, which could result in more accepting views on premarital and/or non-committed sex.

Stronger religious influences are associated with lower rates of casual sex, more unfavorable attitudes toward nonmarital sexual activity, and stricter gender standards for sexual behavior, according to cross-national studies. As part of larger cultural trends toward individualism and sexual liberty, more secular nations, like those in Northern and Western Europe, tend to be more tolerant of casual sex.

Many religions disapprove of sex outside marriage (see religion and sexuality), and the consequences range from very serious to none. Also, marriage is defined in quite different ways in different cultures, for example, with "short-term marriage" (see Nikah mut'ah).

Although some religious views look upon casual sex negatively, individual views on casual sex vary based on personal traits such as autonomy. Religious people and non-religious people mostly have similar feelings when it comes to having casual sex, with a bigger difference in attitude taking place between men and women.

== Commercial sites ==
Many specialist online dating services or other websites, known as "adult personals" or "adult matching" sites, cater to people looking for a purely sexual relationship without emotional attachments. These can provide a relatively anonymous forum where people who are geographically close but in totally separate work and social circles can make contact.

Tinder is a free smartphone dating app that boasts over 10 million daily users, making it the most popular dating app for iOS and Android. In this app, users can either swipe right (which indicates interest) or swipe left (which indicates disinterest) on other users in hopes of matching each other. If both users swipe right on one another, they are a match, and messaging can be initiated between parties. This app is used for a variety of reasons, one of which is casual hookups. Men are more likely than women to use Tinder to seek out casual sexual encounters. This is attributed to men, in comparison to women, placing sexual pleasure at a higher level of importance and using social networking sites to fulfill this need. However, overall, more users are motivated to use it to find romance rather than sex. Despite this, there is a social concern as some believe that the app encourages hookups between users.

== See also ==
- Back-up partner
- Cottaging
- Dogging
- Group sex
- Promiscuity
- Sociosexuality
- Treating (dating)

== Bibliography ==
- Ehrenreich, Barbara, Elizabeth Hess, and Gloria Jacobs. Re-Making Love: The Feminization of Sex. Doubleday, 1986 (ISBN 0-385-18498-0)
