= FabSwingers =

Social networking website for swingers

FabSwingers is a British adult social networking and online dating service aimed primarily at swingers and people seeking casual relationships. The website was established in 2006 by a swinging couple. The website has options for men, women and transgender users, and allows users to sort by location, venues, as well as individual fetishes and kinks. It has a companion website called FabGuys which is aimed at gay and bisexual men, as well as transgender people.

== Features ==
A profile on FabSwingers can represent a single person or a couple and consists of age, gender and sexual orientation along with a list of interests which can include cuckoldry, dogging and oral sex, among others. Profiles can also be verified for authenticity when the user submits a photograph of themselves along with their username written down.

FabSwingers operates on a freemium model with features including seeing higher-resolution photos and seeing other users who have looked at the logged-in profile. Advertising is also removed for paying members.

== Reception ==
The user interface of the website has been criticised for being dated.

== Incidents ==
In March 2018, a man fatally stabbed a transgender woman following an encounter arranged on FabSwingers. He was found guilty of murder and sentenced on 1 November.

In June 2026, a BBC News investigation found that 329 crime reports since 2023 mentioned the site and included allegations of rape, coercive control and assault, though it noted the figures did not establish FabSwingers was responsible. The forces that responded also recorded 26 people as having been charged or summonsed in cases where FabSwingers had been mentioned, with 23 cases ongoing. The BBC did not request information about any of the UK's other swinging websites. FabSwingers said consent was the foundation of swinging and that it had co-operated with the police.
