= Swinging (sexual practice) =

Non-monogamous sexual practice

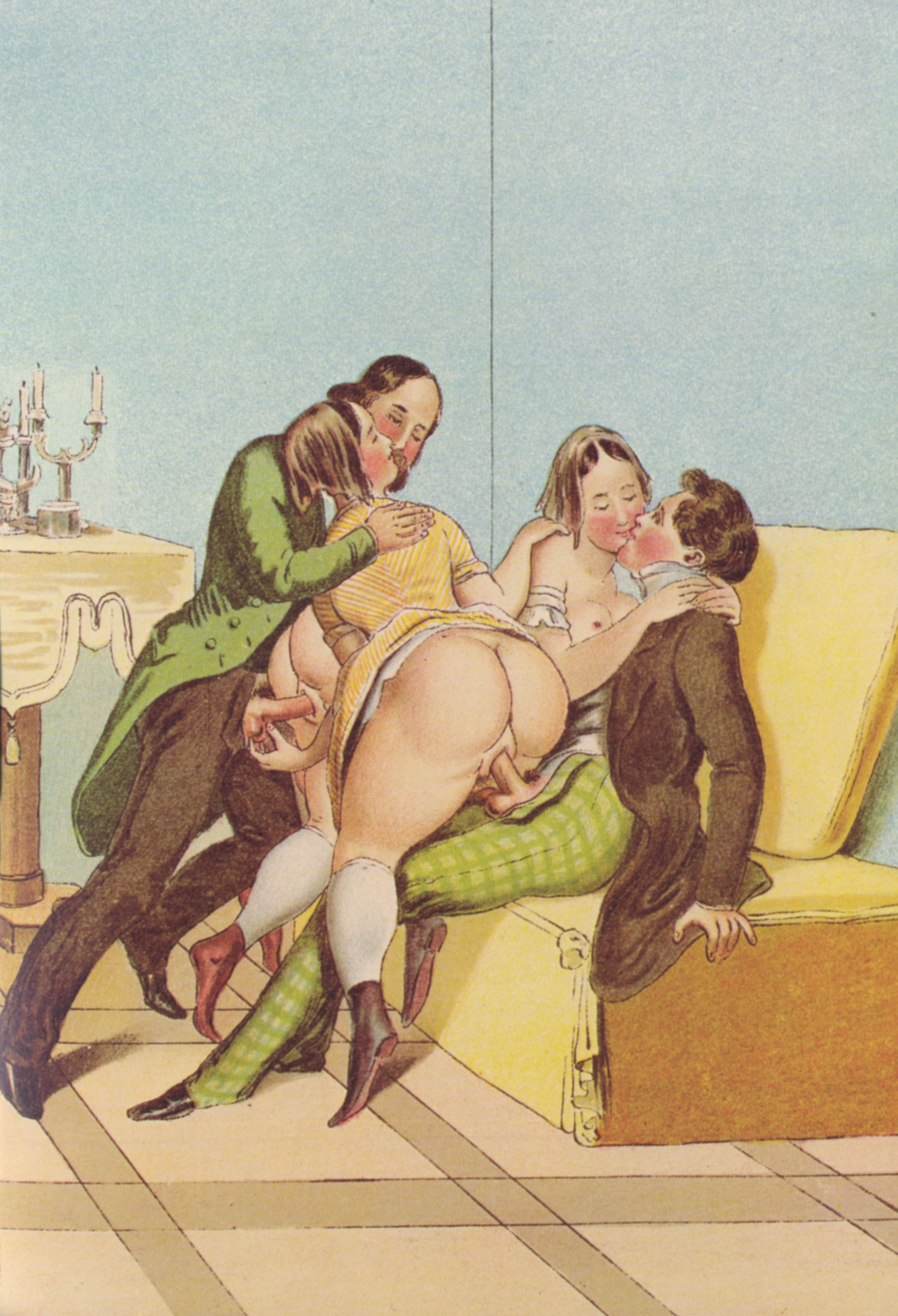
Swinging can take place in a number of contexts, ranging from spontaneous sexual activity involving partner swapping or adding a third or more participants at an informal gathering of friends

Swinging (also referred to as wife-swapping, husband-swapping, or partner-swapping) is a sexual activity in which both singles and partners in a committed relationship engage with others sexually as a recreational activity. Swinging is a form of non-monogamy. People may choose a swinging lifestyle for a variety of reasons. Practitioners cite an increased quality and quantity of sex. Some people may engage in swinging to add variety into their otherwise conventional sex lives or due to their curiosity. Some couples see swinging as a healthy outlet and means to strengthen their relationship.

The term was introduced by the media in the United States during the 1950s to describe this emerging phenomenon. Swinging, or its wider discussion and practice, is regarded by some as arising from the freer attitudes to sexual activity after the sexual revolution of the 1960s, the invention and availability of the contraceptive pill, and the emergence of treatments for many of the sexually transmitted infections that were known at that time. The adoption of safe sex practices became more common in the late 1980s. It is also a recurring theme in pornography.

The swingers community sometimes refers to itself as "the lifestyle", or as "the alternative lifestyle".

== Description ==
John Stossel produced an investigative news report into the swinging lifestyle. Stossel's report in 2005 cited Terry Gould's research, which concluded that "couples swing in order to not cheat on their partners". When Stossel asked swinging couples whether they worry their spouse will "find they like someone else better", one male replied, "People in the swinging community swing for a reason. They don't swing to go out and find a new wife". A woman asserted, "It makes women more confident – that they are the ones in charge". Stossel interviewed 12 marriage counselors. According to Stossel, "not one of them said don't do it", though some said "getting sexual thrills outside of marriage can threaten a marriage". Swingers whom Stossel interviewed said "their marriages are stronger because they don't have affairs and they don't lie to each other".

Swinging can take place in a number of contexts, ranging from spontaneous sexual activity involving partner swapping or adding a third or more participants at an informal gathering of friends to planned regular social meetings to "hooking up" with like-minded people at a sex club (also known as a swinger club, not to be confused with a strip club). Different clubs offer varied facilities and atmospheres, and often hold "theme" nights.

Swinging is also known to take place in semi-public venues such as hotels, resorts, or cruise ships, or often in private homes. Furthermore, many websites that cater to swinging couples now exist, some having hundreds of thousands of members.

In 2018, a study of the prevalence of non-monogamous practices in the United States estimated that 2.35% of Americans currently self-identify as swingers and 4.76% had identified as swingers at some point in their lifetime.

== Effects ==
=== Relationship quality ===
Research on swinging has been conducted in the United States since the late 1960s. One 2000 study, based on an Internet questionnaire addressed to visitors of swinger-related sites, found swingers reported happiness is higher in their relationships than the norm-reported happiness.

=== Sexually-transmitted infections ===
Swingers are exposed to the same types of risks as people who engage in casual sex, with the main concerns being the risk of pregnancy or contracting a sexually transmitted infection (STI). Some swingers engage in unprotected sex, a practice known as barebacking, while others follow safe sex practices and will not engage with others who do not also practice safe sex. In most swingers' clubs, condoms are freely available and sometimes the club may require their use. Swingers may reduce the risk of STI by exchanging STI test results and serosorting. Proponents of swinging argue that safe sex is accepted within the swinging community and the risk of sexual disease is the same for them as for the general population – and that some populations of sexually non-monogamous people have clearly lower rates of STIs than the general population. Opponents are also concerned about the risk of pregnancy and STIs such as HIV, arguing that even protected sex is risky given that some STIs may be spread regardless of the use of condoms, such as herpes and HPV. In a 1992 study, an overall 7% of swingers had quit swinging because of the HIV/AIDS epidemic. It was also stated that 62% of swingers changed their sex practices, by becoming more selective with partners or by practicing safe sex.

A Dutch study that compared the medical records of self-reported swingers to that of the general population found that STI prevalence was highest in young people, homosexual men, and swingers. However, this study has been criticized as not being representative of swinger populations as a whole: its data was formulated solely on patients receiving treatment at an STI clinic. The study concluded that the safest demographic for STI infection were female prostitutes. According to the Dutch study, "the combined rates of chlamydia and gonorrhea were just over 10% among straight people, 14% among gay men, just under 5% in female prostitutes, and 10.4% among swingers."

== In North American society ==
According to Terry Gould's The Lifestyle: A look at the erotic rites of swingers, swinging began among American Air Force pilots and their wives during World War II before pilots left for overseas duty. The mortality rate of pilots was so high, as Gould reports, that a close bond arose between pilot families that implied that pilot husbands would care for all the wives as their own – emotionally and sexually – if the husbands were lost. The realities of the demographics and basing of US Army Air Force (USAAF) pilots and crew suggest that this arrangement did not evolve during WWII, instead evolving later. US military personnel in WWII were not accompanied by their families (and many, especially in the USAAF, were single) – the giant military bases where families live while accompanying a deployed soldier, sailor, aviator, or Marine are mostly Cold War creations. By the time the Korean War ended, swinging had spread from the military to the suburbs. This phenomenon was usually referred to as wife-swapping.

Later in the 1960s at the height of the Free Love movement, the activities associated with swinging became more widespread in a variety of social classes and age levels. In the 1970s, sometimes referred to as "The Swinging '70s", swinging activities became more prevalent, but were still considered "alternative" or "fringe" because of their association with non-mainstream groups such as communes.

In 2002, swingers' rights were added to the mission of the [American] National Coalition for Sexual Freedom.

A common myth claims that a "key party" is a form of swinger party, in which male partners place their car or house keys into a common bowl or bag on arriving, and at the end of the evening the female partners randomly select a set of keys from the bowl and are obligated to leave and have sex with its owner. However, numerous researchers have tried unsuccessfully to confirm a first-hand account of such a party, suggesting that they are nothing more than an urban legend.

According to economic studies on swinging, the information and communications technology revolution, together with improvements in medicine, has been effective in reducing some of the costs of swinging and hence in increasing the number of swingers.

== Swinger party ==
A swinger party or partner-swapping party is a gathering at which individuals or couples in a committed relationship can engage in sexual activities with others as a recreational or social activity.

Swinger parties may involve various group sex activities. Partners can engage in penetrative sex, known as "full swap", or choose to "soft swap" in which they engage only in non-penetrative sex. New swinging couples often choose a soft swap before they are comfortable with a full swap, although many couples stay soft swap for personal reasons.

=== Soft swinging ===
"Soft swinging" refers to couples engaging in sexual activities with only each other while other couples perform sex acts in the immediate vicinity.

== See also ==
- Yes no maybe list
- Candaulism
- Concubinage
- Contact magazine
- Cuckoldry as a fetish
- Cuckqueanry as a fetish
- FabSwingers
- Gang bang
- Group marriage
- Group sex
- Hedonism
- Human sexuality
- Libertine
- Meet market
- (NTR) Netorare / Netorase / Netori
- Open marriage
- Polyamory
- Polyfidelity
- Promiscuity
- Unicorn hunting
