= Terry Gould =

American-born Canadian author and investigative journalist

Terry Gould is an American-Canadian author and investigative journalist.

== Early life ==
Gould was born in Brooklyn, New York, U.S. Gould's grandfather was a Jewish mobster in New York.

== Career ==
Gould is an author of several books and articles on organized crime and social issues. Gould has earned 48 awards and honors from numerous foundations, including the Canadian Association of Journalists, Canadian Journalists for Free Expression and the National Magazine Awards. In April 2015, it was announced his latest book won the J. W. Dafoe Book Prize for the best nonfiction book on Canada, Canadians, and/or Canada's place in the world.

== Works ==
Gould's list of books are:

- The Lifestyle: A Look at the Erotic Rites of Swingers (1999): about the subculuture of Swinging.
- Paper Fan: The Hunt for Triad Gangster Steven Wong (2004) :about Gould's quest to illuminate the world of Steven Wong, a major Asian mafioso.
- Murder Without Borders: Dying for the Story in the World's Dangerous Places (2009) (called "Marked for Death" in the USA): about the motivations and biographies of journalists who risk (and ultimately lose) their lives because of their work.
- Worth Dying For: Canada's Mission to Train Police in the World's Failing States (2014)
