= Sexual trauma therapy =

Interventions provided to survivors of sexual violence

Sexual trauma therapy is medical and psychological interventions provided to survivors of sexual violence aiming to treat their physical injuries and cope with mental trauma caused by the event. Examples of sexual violence include any acts of unwanted sexual actions like sexual harassment, groping, rape, and circulation of sexual content without consent.

Different forms of sexual trauma therapy can be applied throughout the healing process. Immediate medical treatment is given to survivors to treat injuries, collect evidence, and prevent sexually transmitted infections (STIs) and pregnancy. Additionally, psychological treatment methods are applied to individuals who have mental illnesses as well as those suffering from emotional aftermath resulting from traumatic events. Psychological treatments include psychodynamic psychotherapy, trauma-focused cognitive behavioral therapy (TF-CBT), eye movement desensitization and reprocessing therapy (EMDR), play therapy, and sex therapy.

== Medical Treatment ==
=== Treating physical injuries ===
General body and genital-anal injuries are common in sexual violence survivors; medical attention is required if one sustained any form of medical injury. Depending on the severity of the condition, the affected person would be treated accordingly. Genital-anal injuries are sustained as a result of sexual penetration, where injuries typically include redness, abrasions and tearing. However, there is a varying prevalence of the type and location of physical trauma presented in survivors. This information can be provided through a thorough examination. Many survivors of sexual violence also seek medical attention as a way to collect forensic evidence.

=== Sexual assault medical forensic exam ===
After the assault, survivors may opt to receive a sexual assault medical forensic exam. During the process, the survivor can stop, pause or skip steps whenever necessary. These exams collect physical evidence such as photographs, DNA samples through internal examination, swabbing of the outer body surface area, blood, urine and hair samples. Internal examinations consist of inspecting the mouth, genitals and anus.

The forensic examination kit, also known as a "rape kit" or sexual assault evidence kit (SAEK) contain instructions, documents and containers for specimens collected and stored, by the medical personnel. The content of the kit varies by geographical regions.

Choosing to receive a sexual assault medical forensic exam can potentially increase the likelihood of prosecution since DNA evidence takes prominence in court. A report of the sexual violence incident can be filed if the survivor wishes to.

=== Testing and treating sexually transmitted infections ===
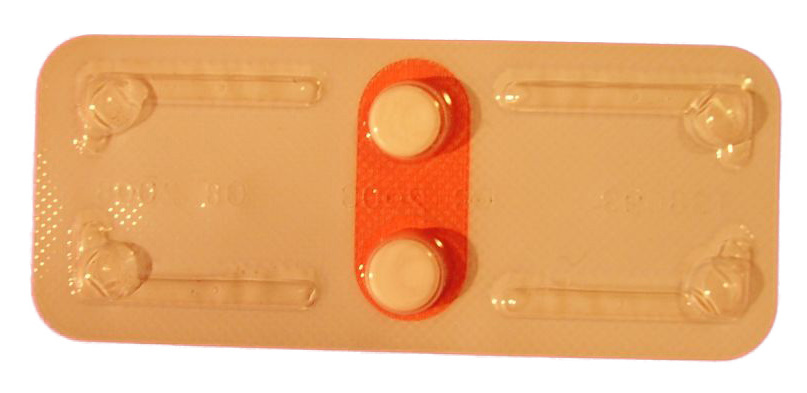
Emergency contraceptive pill.

STIs such as chlamydia, gonorrhoea, human immunodeficiency virus infection (HIV) and human papillomavirus infection (HPV) are other possible repercussions of penetrative sexual violence. If the disease is left untreated, the survivor may be burdened with long term complications which include: pelvic inflammatory disease, infertility, and some types of cancers.

Immediate and selective testing is recommended for individuals who opt to receive a medical examination after the event to allow for early management and treatment.

Treatment of STIs varies between individuals and the type of infections. The physician would consider the medical history and methods to prevent re-traumatising the survivor. Some forms of recommended treatments include antibiotics for bacterial infections and emergency contraception for HIV, HPV and hepatitis B.

=== Prevention or assistance for pregnancy ===
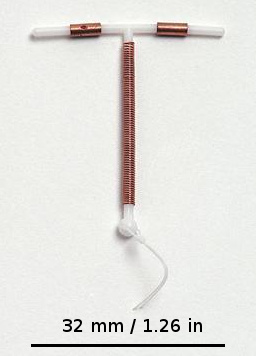
A copper intrauterine device (IUD).

Individuals can use emergency contraception to help prevent pregnancy after penetrative sexual violence. This may include taking emergency contraceptive pills or inserting an emergency copper intrauterine device (IUD). They are effective up to five days after the event. To validate the outcome, pregnancy tests can be taken ten days or more, after the event.

If one does become pregnant due to sexual violence, they can decide to terminate the pregnancy or carry it to full term. If the individual proceeds with the pregnancy, they can decide whether to place the child up for adoption or raise the child and undertake follow-up care. The decided course of action largely depends on the abortion laws and adoption laws of the geographical location of which the individual resides.

=== Medication for mental health treatment ===
Following sexual violence, survivors may experience various negative mental health consequences, including but not limited to:

- Post-traumatic stress disorders (PTSD)
- Anxiety disorder
- Depression
- Eating disorders
- Sleep disorders
- Suicide attempts

Medication can be used along with psychological therapy to help the individual on a short-term basis, with psychotherapeutic treatment being the main form of mental health recovery.

The use of medication must be prescribed and monitored carefully by a medical professional to prevent dependence and overuse of psychotropic drugs.

== Psychotherapeutic Treatment ==
Psychotherapy, which is often referred to as "talk therapy", is an intervention to address psychological and behavioral changes as well as mental problems in individuals. Survivors of sexual trauma are also subjected to victimisation, especially adolescents, which increases their likelihood of developing psychological issues.

=== Psychodynamic Psychotherapy ===
The psychodynamic psychotherapy approach utilizes the role played by the survivor's unconscious mind to alleviate their symptoms. Psychodynamic psychotherapy allows individuals to confront their trauma, understand what it means to have gone through sexual violence, acknowledge the aftereffects, and how it results in their current behavior and thoughts.

When treating a survivor of sexual trauma, psychodynamic psychotherapy focuses on several features. They are:

- Discussion of the event
- Recognizing any repeated themes and patterns of the conversation
- Examining any avoidance behavior towards specific elements of the event
- Emotions and feelings of the client
- Client's interpersonal relationships
- Client's relationship with the therapist
- Exploring the client's dreams, fantasies and wishes

=== Trauma-focused Cognitive Behavioral Therapy ===
TF-CBT is a treatment approach under cognitive behavioral therapy (CBT) that targets children and adolescents with trauma experiences, including sexual trauma. It aims to reduce trauma symptoms and re-condition negative thought patterns of the survivor. As this technique is commonly used on children and adolescents, alongside focusing on the survivor, the treatment also helps non-offending caregivers, parents, and guardians. The therapeutic focus on caregivers is placed on assisting them in apprehending and processing the trauma, working through their emotional distress, and how to support the survivor.

TF-CBT is a short-term treatment model used at mental health facilities or in-home, hospital, community environments. Each session could be held individually with the survivor and caregiver or jointly with both parties. In the individual sessions, the aim is to work on skills to address the sexual trauma and then practice the skills in joint sessions. During individual sessions with the survivor, a technique that is often applied is trauma narrative. This technique encourages survivors to open up to the trauma's detail and to confront the sexual trauma.

This therapy approach may not be suitable if survivors are experiencing suicidal temptations or actively abuses substances. The confrontation of their past sexual trauma may trigger impulses and worsen current symptoms.

==== Efficacy ====
In a systematic review, CBT has been reported to be a practical therapeutic approach to PTSD from a range of trauma, including sexual abuse. In the same systematic review, two studies made a direct comparison between psychodynamic psychotherapy and TF-CBT. This comparison indicated psychodynamic psychotherapy to be equally or even moderately more effective than TF-CBT. While other direct comparisons suggested TF-CBT was more effective, specific cases reported signs of increased anxiety and distress. The effectiveness was measured by the presence and severity of PTSD symptoms. Overall, the use of this approach exhibited improvement in patients, however, the role of TF-CBT as a preferred treatment should be monitored.

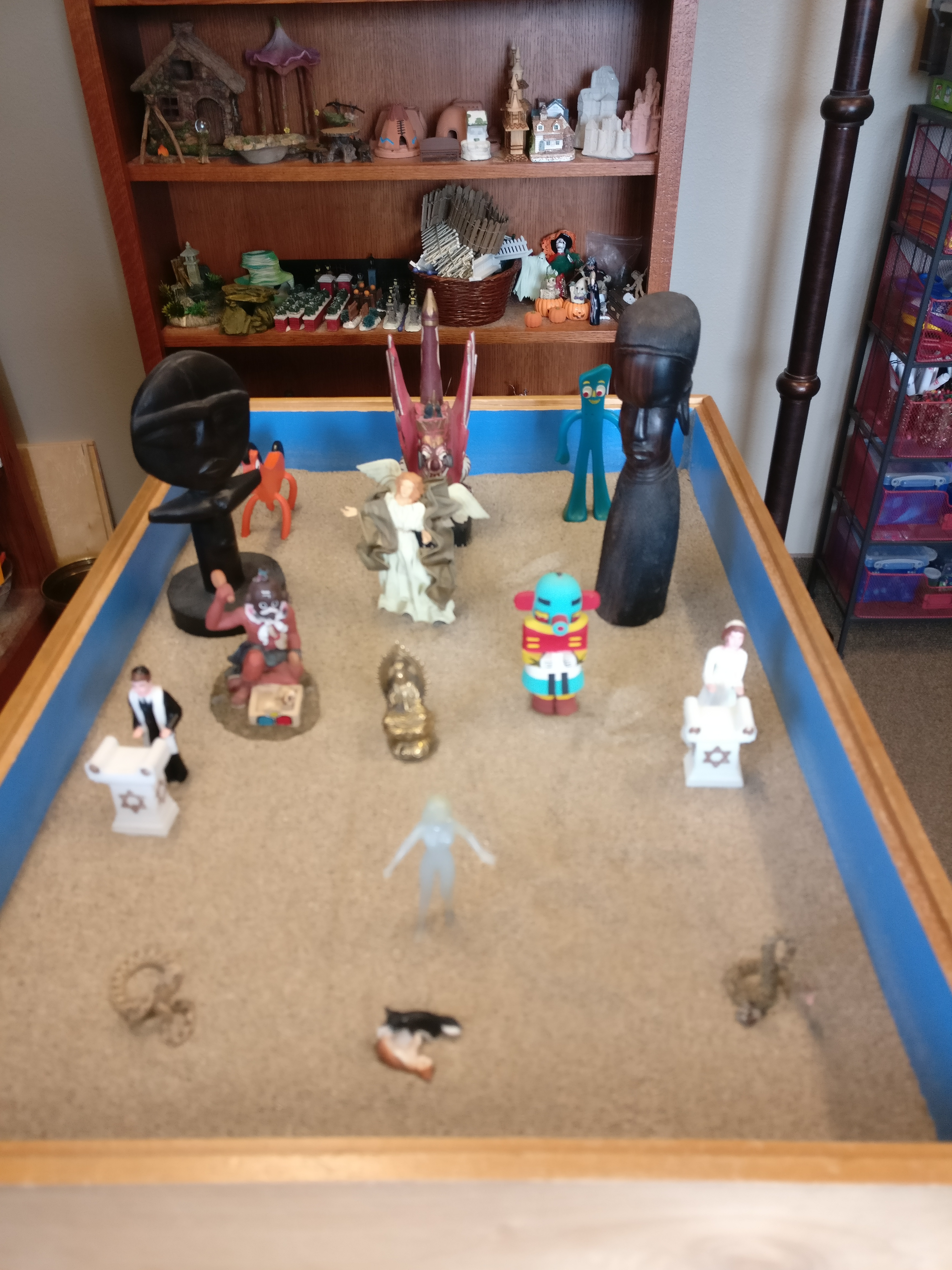
An example of a sand play therapy set up.

=== Play therapy ===
Play therapy targets survivors of a younger age as they are yet to have the proper cognitive skills to understand their sexual trauma experience. The individual engages in play activities such as sand play, toys, games or puppets while establishing trust and better communication with the therapist. Play activities allow young survivors to express emotions through a familiar self-expression mechanism while learning to understand and work through sexual trauma.

Play therapy can be utilized in an individual or group setting. In a group setting, it includes an added dimension of interaction with other young survivors while participating in play activities. Group play therapy allows children to feel comfortable and establish trust with other children. The structure of group play therapy can be either directive or non-directive. Directive sessions are guided by the therapist, using different play activities to set specific objectives and goals for the session. In non-directive sessions, it takes on a less structured approach where the therapist provides space and safety for sexually abused children to talk through the sexual trauma when ready. Group play therapy can help work through negative behavior exhibited by sexually abused children due to sexual trauma. Common behavioral symptoms include:

- Aggression towards other children or during play
- Disengagement of oneself from the group during play
- Hyper-vigilance
- Exhibit unwanted sexual behavior towards other children within the playroom environment
- Reenacting their sexual abuse on dolls and toys
- Dissociation and inability to focus during group play
- Signs of conflict with other members of group play
- Exhibiting the need to be nurtured and cared for in pretend play or taking on the role of providing care to dolls

Non-offending parents can also be invited to participate in play therapy. The parent's role is to establish a sense of safety for the child during the session. It would also be a chance to improve and work on any relationship strains between the two parties due to the sexual trauma. While this approach is practiced, it may pose a potential breach of patient confidentiality.

==== Efficacy ====
A meta-analysis found that a combination of play therapy with other psychotherapies (TF-CBT, supportive therapy, psychodynamic therapy) presented lower levels of sexualized behavior, anxiety, depression, and behavior problems upon therapy. Play therapy alone did not achieve statistically significant outcomes. Another systematic review also concluded that play therapy did not have sufficient evidence to prove its effectiveness on reducing PTSD symptoms following a traumatic event in children.

=== Eye movement desensitization and reprocessing therapy ===
EMDR can help restructure memories associated with the sexual trauma experience of the survivor. The exact mechanism of how EMDR achieves this remains unknown. The original understanding hypothesizes the involvement of the adaptive information processing (AIP) area within the brain to alter negative thoughts into more positive thoughts. The therapist can encourage the activation of the survivor's AIP through triggering bilateral brain stimulation. In EMDR, bilateral brain stimulation can be achieved with the therapist placing their fingers before the survivor's face, producing finger movements for the survivor's eyes to follow. The source of the movement does not matter. As the survivor focuses on the movement, the therapist will begin asking questions to prompt any recollection of the sexual trauma event allowing for the brain's bilateral stimulation.

EMDR for sexual trauma consists of six different components; one of them is bilateral stimulation. The five others include:

1. Target image - establishing the survivor's key image related to the sexual trauma incident that occurred.
2. Negative Cognitions - understanding and identifying any negative self-perpetuated thoughts that stemmed from the trauma.
3. Positive Cognitions - identifying positive affirmations of the survivor that will be utilized to replace their negative cognitions.
4. Level of Emotional Disturbance - recognizing negative emotions associated with the trauma.
5. Body sensations - identifying physical sensations that coexist with the negative emotions felt by the survivor.

A typical EMDR treatment approach would begin with assessing the suitability of the survivor to undergo EMDR. This would include collecting information about attempted treatment plans. EMDR may prompt adverse side effects that are specific to the survivor's overall condition and day-to-day practices; therefore, suitability varies. Once EMDR is considered appropriate, the therapist will familiarize and allow the survivor to feel comfortable. The six components stated will then be used to assess the survivor's situation and restructure the memory of the target image to reinforce positive cognitions. Progress may require multiple sessions and is reviewed frequently.

==== Efficacy ====
In a systematic review on psychotherapies targeting PTSD, authors concluded that both TF-CBT and EMDR showed greater improvement compared to recommended treatment. An additional systematic review also found EMDR to reduce PTSD symptoms. However, supplementary studies are required to obtain more conclusive and reliable evidence.

=== Sex therapy ===
Sexually traumatized individuals may experience PTSD expressed in the form of sexual dysfunction, fear of sexual activity and intimacy within relationships. This can be treated through sex therapy. Sex therapy can be conducted individually or with a partner.

Sex therapy integrates building on skills within the cognitive and behavioral areas for both parties in therapy. For cognitive areas, the survivor works to recondition negative self-perception and come to terms with the incident without blaming oneself. The partner can support the survivor's progress by understanding how their past sexual trauma caused PTSD symptoms. Building skills for the behavioral areas by implementing a series of verbal and stimulation activities can help the couple work towards becoming sexually comfortable again.

== See also ==
- Yes no maybe list
