= Open marriage =

Form of non-monogamy

Open marriage is a form of non-monogamy in which the partners of a dyadic marriage agree that each may engage in extramarital sexual or romantic relationships, without this being regarded by them as infidelity or adultery, and consider or establish an open relationship despite the implied monogamy of marriage. There are variant forms of open marriage such as swinging and polyamory, each with the partners having varying levels of input into their spouse's activities.

== Terminology ==
A general definition of an open marriage is that there is an agreement between the two partners to have some degree of sexual interaction outside the couple. There are variant forms of open marriage, each with the partners having varying levels of input on their spouse's activities.

The term open marriage originated in sociology and anthropology. Through the 1960s, researchers used "closed marriage" to indicate the practices of communities and cultures where individuals were intended to marry based upon social conventions and proscriptions, and open marriage where individuals had the ability to make their own choice of spouse.

Open Marriage: A New Life Style for Couples was a best selling book published by M. Evans & Company in 1972 by Nena O'Neill and George O'Neill. It was on the New York Times Best Seller list for 40 weeks. It has been translated into 14 languages and has sold more than 35 million copies worldwide according to the publisher. The book changed the meaning of the term. The O'Neills describe open marriage as a relationship in which each partner has room for personal growth and can individually develop outside friendships, rather than focus obsessively on their couplehood and their family unit (being "closed"). Most of the book describes approaches to revitalizing marriage in areas of trust, role flexibility, communication, identity, and equality. Chapter 16, entitled "Love Without Jealousy", devoted 20 pages to the proposition that an open marriage might possibly include some forms of sexuality with other partners. Fueled by frequent appearances of the O'Neills on television and in magazine articles, the redefinition entered popular consciousness, and open marriage became a synonym for sexually non-monogamous marriage.

In her 1977 book The Marriage Premise, Nena O'Neill advocated sexual fidelity in a chapter of that name. As she later said, "The whole area of extramarital sex is touchy. I don't think we ever saw it as a concept for the majority, and certainly it has not proved to be."

=== Definitional issues ===
The meaning of open marriage can vary from study to study depending on how the particular researchers have set their selection criteria.

Individuals might claim to have open marriages when their spouses would not agree. Studies and articles that interview individuals without taking their married status into account may not receive accurate information about the actual "open" status of the marriage. Blumstein and Schwartz asked more than 6,000 couples whether or not they had an understanding allowing sex outside their relationship. Interviewed individually, the partners in some couples gave very different responses to this question; the respective replies from one married couple were

- "We've never spoken about cheating, but neither of us believe in it. I don't think I'd ever forgive him. I don't think I'd be able to. I don't know. I haven't met up with that situation." (Blumstein & Schwartz, 1983, p. 287).
- "Sure we have an understanding. It's 'You do what you want. Never go back to the same one.' See, that's where it's going to screw your mind up, to go back the second time to the same person." (Blumstein & Schwartz, 1983, p. 286).

Couples may have an open marriage in principle, but not engage in extramarital sex. Studies that define open marriage by agreement alone will tend to report a higher incidence than studies that define open marriage by agreement and behavior. Spaniel and Cole found that 7 percent of couples would consider participating in an open marriage, but only 1.7 percent of couples reported having open marriages that actually included extramarital sex. Blumstein and Schwartz found that 15 percent of married couples share an agreement that allows extramarital sex, but only about 24 percent of men and 22 percent of women (or 6 percent and 5 percent of the total, respectively) who had such an agreement actually engaged in extramarital sex during the prior year.

Researchers have applied open marriage in overly narrow terms, as when Hunt used it specifically to mean swinging couples who meet with other swinging couples to swap mates.

Open marriage is usually defined in terms of legally married, opposite-sex partners, and thus data collected may not generalize to other kinds of open relationships. For example, cohabiting couples tend to show higher levels of involvement in extra-relational intimacy compared to married couples. Gay male couples show very high levels of open relationships compared to straight couples.

There is a lack of content regarding studies and educational programming in open marriage and diverse relationship structures. Due to this, there is much uncertainty regarding the topic.

Common misconceptions of nonmonogamy include that it violates principles of all religions, and that it is equivalent to polygyny (one man having multiple wives) or polygamy (a marriage of many).

=== Ideals of an open marriage ===
- Here-and-now living combined with realistic expectations: There is a reduction of commitment to and sacrifice in the long-term goals.
- Personal privacy: A greater respect for personal privacy than in a traditional marriage.
- Open and honest communication: sharing, self-disclosure, and productive fighting.
- Role flexibility: open partners exhibit this considerably.
- Open companionship: avoiding traditional marriage assumptions of coupledness. This may involve the development of deep personal, sexual relationships with other members outside their marriage.
- Equality: equality of power as well as responsibility.
- Pursuit of identity: An individual's uniqueness is valued, differences are not seen as a threat.
- Mutual trust: an assumption that everything is out on the open and that one's partner is not a possession that is guarded.

== Relationship maintenance ==
The impact of open marriage on relationships varies across couples. Some couples report high levels of marital satisfaction and have long-lasting open marriages. Other couples drop out of the open marriage lifestyle and return to sexual monogamy. These couples may continue to believe open marriage is a valid way of life, just not for them.

The extent to which open marriage actually contributes to divorce remains uncertain. Blumstein and Schwartz note a slightly higher risk of divorce among couples who engage in extramarital sex, even if the couples agree to allow extramarital sex. However, Rubin and Adams did not observe any significant difference in the risk of divorce for couples in open marriages and couples in sexually monogamous marriages.

=== Jealousy issues ===
A 1981 study concluded that around 80 percent of people in open marriages experienced jealousy over their extramarital relationships. Couples in open marriages experienced as much or more jealousy than people in sexually monogamous marriages.

== Styles ==
Couples in open marriages may prefer different kinds of extramarital relationships. Couples who prefer extramarital relationships emphasizing love and emotional involvement have a polyamorous style of open marriage. Couples who prefer extramarital relationships emphasizing sexual gratification and recreational friendships have a swinging style of open marriage. These distinctions may depend on psychological factors such as sociosexuality and may contribute to the formation of separate Polyamory and Swinging communities. Despite their distinctions, however, all open marriages share common issues: the lack of social acceptance, the need to maintain the health of their relationship and avoid neglect, and the need to manage jealous rivalry.

Many open couples establish rules that forbid emotional attachment, extramarital children, extramarital sex in the marital bed, extramarital sex with those known to both partners, or extramarital sex without the use of barrier contraception.

Some open marriages are one-sided. Some situations giving rise to this are where the libidos of partners differ greatly, or illness renders one partner incapable of, or no longer desiring, sex. The couple may remain together while one partner seeks out sexual gratification as he or she sees fit. The difference between these situations and a cheating situation is that both partners in the marriage are aware of, and agree to the arrangement.

=== Types of openness: from "polyamory style" to "swinging style" ===
Extramarital relationships vary in terms of the degree of sexual involvement desired and the degree of emotional involvement desired. Presented with the potentiality of non-monogamous intimacy, a given individual might be motivated more either by the desire for multiple sexual partners or a wider erotic experience than offered by monogamy, or by the desire for multiple others with whom to form an emotional or familial bond.

Polyamory is motivated by a desire to expand love by developing emotionally involved relationships with extramarital partners. Swinging is motivated by a desire for physical gratification by engaging in sexual activities with extramarital partners. The distinction between polyamory and swinging applies to open marriages. Delineation of polyamory and swinging has appeared in academic literature, popular media, and Web sites devoted respectively to polyamory and to swinging. (The swing sites prefer to frame the distinction more along Gould's "utopic swingers" and "recreational swingers".)

=== Psychological basis ===
The preference for a polyamorous versus a swinging style of open marriage may depend on many psychological factors. One factor may be sociosexuality, an individual's willingness to engage in sexual behavior without having emotional ties to the sex partner. Individuals who are very willing to engage in sexual behavior without emotional ties are said to have unrestricted sociosexuality. Individuals who are very unwilling to engage in sexual behavior without emotional ties are said to have restricted sociosexuality. Individuals can vary along a continuum from unrestricted to restricted sociosexuality.

=== Community implications ===
Couples with different styles of open marriage tend to self-segregate in order to find others who share similar philosophies and interests, which has likely contributed to the development of separate polyamory and swinging communities. These offer informational resources and support, even if a given couple in an open marriage cannot see themselves joining either community. Some couples may not have a strong preference for either style of open marriage, feeling equally at home in either community.

The partners within a couple may differ in their respective preferences. One partner may prefer a polyamorous style of open marriage and participate in the Polyamory community, while the other partner may prefer a swinging style of open marriage and participate in the swinging community. Variations in couple preferences and individual preferences thus can result in overlap between the polyamory and swinging communities.

== Criticism ==
=== Christianity and other religions ===
Some critics object to open marriages on the ground that open marriages violate religious principles. For example, open marriages contradict traditional Christian doctrine. Open marriages also violate the prohibition against adultery in the Ten Commandments. The definition of sexual immorality in Christianity includes the practices of open marriage and therefore it is considered an immutable reason for a dissolution of marriage. Judaism holds similar values as Christianity in these matters. Islamic teachings however allow for polygynous marriages albeit for the male partner only. Islam prohibits this practice for the female partner. The perceived validity of these objections depends entirely on individual faith. Generally, non-monogamous people tend not to be very religious. A 1998 review observed that, across the various studies, most swingers (approximately two-thirds) claimed to have no religious affiliation.

=== Evidence of disapproval ===
Surveys show consistently high disapproval of extramarital sex. Hunt mentions three general-population surveys conducted in the 1960s in which large majorities disapproved of extramarital sex under any conditions. More recent surveys show that 75–85 percent of adults in the United States disapprove of extramarital sex. Similar levels of disapproval are observed in other Western societies. Widmer, Treas, and Newcomb surveyed over 33,500 people in 24 nations and found 85 percent of people believed extramarital sex was "always" or "nearly always" wrong. Much of the disapproval is attributed to "religious and moral reasons."

A few studies have shown more direct disapproval of open marriage. In a national study of several hundred women and men, Hunt (1974) reported that around 75 percent of women and over 60 percent of men agreed with the statement "Mate-swapping is wrong." A 1975 study of several hundred men and women living in the midwestern United States found that 93 percent would not consider participating in swinging. A 2005 study asked 111 college women about various forms of marriage and family. These young women viewed open marriage as one of the least desirable forms of marriage, with 94 percent saying they would never participate in a marriage where the man has a right to sex outside the marriage, and 91 percent saying they would never participate in a marriage where the woman has a right to sex outside the marriage.

=== Health concerns ===
Studies in the 1970s found that engaging in sex with a greater number of partners increases risk of contracting sexually transmitted diseases. These concerns do not apply to open marriage alone, which would affect only 1 to 6 percent of the married population. A 1985 study found that 33 percent of male swingers and 10 percent of female swingers claimed to actively fear this risk. In a 1992 study, sexually transmitted diseases topped the list of disadvantages of swinging, and 58 percent of swingers expressed some fear of HIV/AIDS. In the 1990s some couples decided to drop out of open marriage lifestyles and become sexually monogamous in response to HIV/AIDS.

A 1998 study found that the risk of sexually transmitted diseases can be greatly reduced by practicing safer sex. However, the percentage of people in open marriages who practice safer sex remained disputed. Anecdotal observations ranged from claiming no one at a swing event practiced safer sex to claiming everyone at an event practiced safer sex. A survey of swingers found that "Over 62% said that they had changed their behaviors because of the AIDS scare. The two most frequently mentioned changes were being more selective with whom they swung and practicing safer sex (e.g., using condoms). Almost 7% said they had quit swinging because of the AIDS epidemic. Finally, one third said that they had not changed any of their habits, and, of these respondents, more than a third said nothing, not even AIDS, would get them to change."

=== Psychological factors ===
Several authors from 1974 to 2000 considered open marriages to be psychologically damaging.

A 1974 study found that some swinger couples experience problems and report that open marriage contributed to their divorces.

Studies in the 1980s found that couples report high levels of satisfaction and enjoy long-lasting open marriages. A 1995 study found that some couples drop out of the open marriage lifestyle and return to sexual monogamy. These couples may continue to view open marriage as a valid lifestyle for others, but not for themselves.

=== Loss of social support ===
Strong social disapproval of open marriage may lead to a loss of psychological and health benefits. People in open marriages may hide their lifestyle from family, friends, and colleagues. Blumstein and Schwartz note:

Openly non-monogamous married and cohabiting couples often feel they are thought of as bizarre or immoral by the rest of their world. They have to work out their sex lives in opposition to the rest of society. They may have an understanding with each other, but they usually keep it secret from family, friends, and people at work. (Blumstein & Schwartz, 1983, p. 294–295)>

Keeping their lifestyles secret reduces the amount of social support available to people in open marriages.

== Incidence ==
In 1983, Blumstein and Schwartz determined that out of 3,498 married men, 903 had an agreement with their spouses allowing extramarital sex; of these, 24 percent (217 men) actually engaged in extramarital sex during the previous year, and overall 6 percent had been actively involved in open marriages during the previous year. The number is only slightly less for women, where of 3,520 married women, 801 had an agreement with their spouses allowing extramarital sex, and 22 percent (or 176 women) actually engaged in extramarital sex during the previous year. This means about 5 percent of married women were actively involved in open marriages during the previous year.

Those estimates are slightly higher than those from other researchers. Hunt, based on interviews from a 1974 national study of sexual behavior, estimated that 2% to 4% of the married population was involved in open marriages. Bartell (1971) estimated that two percent of the married population was involved in open marriages. The lowest estimate comes from a study conducted by Spanier and Cole (1975) of several hundred people living in the midwestern United States, which found 1.7 percent of married people involved in open marriages.

Following the 1972 publication of Open Marriage, the popular media expressed a belief that open marriages were on the rise. However, Hunt concluded the incidence of extramarital sex had remained about the same for many years:

Among wives under 25, however, there is a very large increase, but even this has only brought the incidence of extramarital behavior for these young women close to—but not yet on par with—the incidence of extramarital behavior among under-25 husbands. (Hunt, 1974, p. 254).

Hunt attributed the mistaken impression of increasing open marriages to a barrage of books, articles, and television shows dealing with the topic. He also notes that speculative comments about increases in open marriage would sometimes be repeated often enough that people cited them as evidence.

Nearly twenty years later (1993), in a national study of sexual behavior, Janus and Janus likewise denied that open marriages were on the rise, and suggested the number of open marriages may have declined:

Despite popularization in a book of that title in the early 1970s, open marriage has never become as prevalent as nonconsensual extramarital activities, and its popularity seems to be waning even further today." (Janus & Janus, 1993, p. 197–198).

A large amount of media interest can mislead people into thinking the incidence of open marriage is on the rise. Conversely, media attention given to the marriage movement can mislead people into thinking the incidence of open marriage is declining. Weiss (1997) notes that "there is no scientific basis for concluding that these patterns increased in popularity earlier or that they have become less common in the 1980s and 1990s."

== See also ==
- Ménage à trois
- Open relationship
- More: A Memoir of Open Marriage
- Yes no maybe list
