= Affection exchange theory =

Communication theory

Affection exchange theory (AET) is a communication theory that explains why human beings express affection and how such expressions contribute to survival and reproductive success. Developed within a socio-evolutionary framework, AET posits that affectionate communication is a biologically adaptive behavior that enhances human viability by fostering relational bonds and promoting physical and mental well-being. The theory emphasizes that affection is not merely a social construct but also serves evolutionary functions by strengthening social ties, supporting caregiving systems, and influencing health outcomes.

== Background and origins ==
Affection exchange theory (AET) was introduced in 2001 by Kory Floyd, currently a professor of human development at Washington State University. The theory was first articulated through two major contributions: a paper presented at the Western States Communication Association conference in Coeur d’Alene, Idaho, in February 2001 titled "Elements of an Affection Exchange Theory: Socioevolutionary Paradigm for Understanding Affectionate Communication", and an article titled “Human Affection Exchange I: Reproductive Probability as a Predictor of Men’s Affection with Their Sons” published in The Journal of Men’s Studies.

At the time, Floyd was a professor at Arizona State University. His work built on existing studies of affection in interpersonal relationships—especially between romantic partners and between parents and children—but AET was the first formal theory to link affectionate behavior to evolutionary fitness and to examine both its short- and long-term effects.

== Theoretical components ==
Affection is commonly thought of as being one of the most fundamental of human needs. Affectionate expressions therefore could be seen as salient to an individual's well-being and relationship formation. According to Floyd (2005), “given the breadth of relational experience in which affectionate communication is common, it is little wonder that it plays such an important role in individual well-being. The importance of affection and affection communication could explain some of the reasons that Floyd introduced the affection exchange theory. Floyd explains, “affection exchange theory treats affectionate communication as an adaptive behavior that contributes to humans’ long-term viability and procreative success” (Floyd, 2001, p. 40).

He also described AET this way: “AET posits that affection exchange contributes to survival because it promotes pair bonding and the increased access to resources pair bonds provide” (Floyd, 2001, pp. 40–41). Another facet of AET was that the exchange of affection served as an indicator to another individual that he or she was a good prospect for parenthood. Lastly, Floyd indicated that when parents show affection to their children, their children are more likely to be successful in reproducing; thus, the parents’ genes will be passed down further. To Floyd, this was seen as a benefit of affection exchange.

=== Five postulates of AET ===
Floyd pointed out five postulates of Affection Exchange Theory in 2006.

1. “The need and capacity for affection are inborn”. Affection exchange is a basic human need and ability, as an innate and stable experience across different historical and social conditions.
2. “Affectionate feelings and affectionate expressions are distinct experiences”. People would modify their emotional displays depending on the specific situations.
3. “Affectionate communication is adaptive with respect to human viability and fertility”. The survival chances can be increased by affectionate communication because there are connections with others, coming with achievable resources both material and emotional to help survive. Besides, it is a physically pleasant choice for human to exchange affection.
4. “There are differences among people in their tolerance for affection”. People have different preferences about the behaviors of affection exchange, such as the skin contacts, so there is not a general standard of affectionate expressions.
5. “People are averse to affectionate behaviors that violate their standards of tolerance”. There would be biological and behavioral reactions from the uncomfortable affectionate behaviors. For some overwhelmed affectionate communication, “high levels of affection could result in transgressions being perceived as more hurtful and severe resulting in higher levels of rumination”.

== Motivation to develop AET ==
=== Receivers' perspective ===
Many studies had shown the benefits of physical and psychological benefits of receiving affectionate communication. For example, Schwartz and Russek (1998) found that college students would experience less physical and psychological distress with the love and caring showed by their parents, while Shuntich, Loh, and Katz (1998) found “received affection to be negatively related to alcohol abuse and physical aggression toward family members”.

Similarly, Floyd had done much work in the area of affection involved in communication processes before introducing this theory. One of the areas that was so unique in the study of affection was the idea of the expectations involved in affection exchange. Canary et al. (2008) point out that the expectations involved in affection exchange as well as a curiosity about the evolutionary and biological bases for affection expectations are what led Floyd to develop this theory. Canary et al. (2008) also note, “In AET, affection is thought of as an adaptive behavior that is helpful to long-term human survival by promoting bonding and increased access to resources. If this theory is correct, affection ought to increase as its ability to enhance survival increases”.

=== Affection givers' perspective ===
Affectionate communication is a resource that begets benefits not only when it is received but also when it is given. In Floyd's series paper “Human affection exchange: V. Attributes of the highly affectionate” (2002), he talked about the benefits from Individual-level predictions and Social-level predictions.

==== Individual-level characteristics ====
According to Floyd's (2002) findings in the study, “individuals who are high affection communicators report greater happiness, higher self-esteem, less depression, less stress, and greater overall mental health than do low affection communicators”.

High affection communicators are more comfortable with intimate relationships, more permissible with closeness, and have “less of a tendency to view relationships as being of secondary importance than do low affection communicators”.

High affection communicators are more likely to have a secure attachment style, while low affection communicators are more likely to have a fearful/avoidant attachment style.

High affection communicators reported greater femininity than did low affection communicators. Men who are high affection communicators could report greater femininity than low-affection women.

==== Social-level characteristics ====
High affection communicators are more socially outgoing and will not isolate themselves from society.

High affection communicators could create romantic relationships more easily and stay satisfied in those relationships.

== Implications of the theory ==
A great deal of this theory's premise can be linked back to Darwin’s principles that state that reproductivity and survival are what serve as humans’ most fundamental motivations. With these ideas in mind, it follows that humans would do everything they could to make sure that their genes carry on, even if that means (intentionally or unintentionally) showing more affection to a child that the parent knew was more likely to reproduce. Linked to this idea, Floyd's studies have shown that fathers display less affection toward their sons if the sons identify as homosexual or bisexual.

In general, AET presents the idea that parents are more likely to show affection to their children who are most likely to pass on the family genes. AET has been used a great deal in studies dealing with relationships between fathers and sons, particularly as it relates to men's sexuality and how that impacts the amount of affection a father shows to his son, the communicative behaviors involved in AET, and how the amount of affection that a father shows to his son correlates with the amount of affection that the son displays toward his children and the generations that follow.

== Applications of the theory ==
=== Stress management ===
Stress management is a constant topic in modern society. In fact, McEwan (1999) estimated that “stress and stress-related disorders take an annual economic toll of nearly $200 billion in the United States alone”. According to Floyd et al. (2007), “expressing affection can be instrumental in alleviating acute stress”, the AET could be used to “aid researchers and clinicians in the development of techniques to help people to manage stress more efficiently”.

==== Predicting resting heart rate and free cortisol secretion ====
Floyd and colleagues (2007) gathered 30 students from a large university in the southwestern United States to do the research. After the stress induction, students were asked to identify their most affectionate relationship and use the “affectionate communication index (ACI)” to report their affectionate communication in the relationship. The researchers kept track of the students’ heart rate and free cortisol level before, between, and after the induction. The data showed that verbal and supportive affection in participants' most affectionate relationships could lower participants’ resting heart rate and is inversely associated with the magnitude of cortisol increase.

==== Accelerating neuroendocrine stress recovery ====
Floyd and other researchers did a similar test as the previous one in 2007. Only in this study, they divided participants into three groups. After taking six standard laboratory stressors tests, each group was asked to write to loved ones expressing the feeling of love, think of loved ones, and sit without doing anything. The result showed that the expression group has lower cortisol values than those in the other two groups. This research supports the idea that "communicating affection following exposure to an acute stressor accelerates adrenocortical recovery".

=== Connections to romantic relationships ===
Affectionate communication is one way individuals express love and appreciation. Expressing love is fundamental for a romantic relationship to form and persist. However, for military couples during deployment, it is hard for them to see each other and express love. Alaina Veluscek (2018) pointed out that affectionate writing during military deployment is one effective way of showing love, and “individuals who engaged in affectionate writing reported higher levels of relational satisfaction than those who did not”.

However, affectionate communication is not always positive. For example, deception is one of the risks of affection. In Horan's study (2016), he explained that people are not comfortable talking about previous sexual behaviors with their partners and some individuals might lie about their sexual histories. Although sex is a communicative activity that could gauge affection, it causes relationship risks when there are deceptions involved. Horan's study focused on sexually transmitted infections (STI). He believed that “one preventive method of STI is honesty surrounding sexual history conversations”.

==== Affection deprivation ====
Affection deprivation is a concept added by Floyd to AET, which is “the condition of wanting more tactile affectionate communication than one receives”. It could be used to explain why some affectionate communication result in unhealthy relationships. Affection deprivation is a concept different from loneliness both conceptually and empirically. There are several indicators related to affection deprivation in close relationship, such as closeness and commitment. “Affection deprivation affects general, social, mental, physical, and/or relational well-being, instructing people in ways to increase their tactile affection can effect improvements to their health and stability”.

==== Affection Deprivation During Pandemic ====
The COVID-19 pandemic, with its associated isolation, intensified stress levels and elevated affection deprivation as a pressing health concern. Holman et al. (2022) highlight how systemic and emotional stressors converge during crises like the pandemic, amplifying the psychological impact of limited affectionate contact.

== Affection deprivation within marital relationships ==
=== Dyadic effects and mental health impacts ===
Drawing on Affection Exchange Theory (AET), Holman et al. (2022) examine the dyadic effects of affection deprivation within marital relationships and their findings indicated that both affectionate communication and its absence significantly affected each partner's mental health and relationship quality. These outcomes are categorized into actor effects (impact on oneself) and partner effects (impact on one's spouse), as further supported by Hesse et al. (2019).

=== Broader health implications ===
Affection deprivation is a common experience, strongly linked to increased loneliness and physical discomfort, reinforcing AET's claim that deprivation in affection can negatively impact overall health.

=== Alexithymia ===
“Alexithymia is a personality trait characterized by a relative inability to understand, process, and describe emotions”.

The symptom has a strong inversely relationship with affectionate experience, close relationship and happiness, and it is directly related to stress and depression.

=== Connection to family relationship ===
==== Grandparent - grandchild relationship ====
Grandchildren often receive affection and care from their grandparents and their relationship with grandparents can be influential in their life. Research using affection exchange theory has shown that grandchildren received more love and esteem from grandmothers and more humor and memories from grandfathers.

Bernhold (2019) emphasizes that grandparent-grandchild relationships often span decades, offering enduring emotional support. The study found that grandparents’ affectionate communication is indirectly linked to reduced loneliness, depressive symptoms, and stress in adult grandchildren—effects that are mediated by a strong sense of shared family identity. These findings stress the importance of older adults modeling lives full of growth, purpose, and affection for the younger generation.

=== Mother–child relationship ===
Curran and Yoshimura (2016) examined how perceptions of affection from fathers influence family dynamics. Their research showed that both mothers and children perceived greater affection across the family system when they experienced high levels of affectionate communication from fathers. Moreover, this fatherly affection was positively associated with overall family and life satisfaction, indicating a spillover effect that reinforces relational well-being throughout the family.

==== Relationship among siblings ====
Sánchez-Aragón (2024) identified sibling relationships during emerging adulthood as a valuable area of study. Their findings emphasized fun and friendship as central elements of sibling quality. Differences among sibling dyads were substantial enough to warrant the development of explanatory models to better understand conflict resolution and relational dynamics within sibling bonds.

== Cultural and equity considerations in AET ==
Affection Exchange Theory (AET) benefits from including cultural and equity perspectives in the context of diverse and marginalized populations. Hudson (2020) examined a mediational model investigating whether perceived social support for sharing relational affection predicted mental well-being through the affectionate behaviors in same-sex, mixed-sex, and gender-diverse relationships.

The study revealed that while relationship processes were broadly similar across groups, individuals in marginalized relationships perceived less support for sharing affection, especially in public contexts. Hudson (2020) highlights show societal norms and systemic inequities influence the expression of affection. Similarly, Clark et al. (2025) presented three distinct profiles of physical behavior—infrequent, affection-focused, and comprehensive—employing a person-centered approach. This approach focuses on individuals as holistic entities rather than isolating variables across a population. In their study, participants were categorized based on how they physically express affection, allowing researchers to analyze how different behavioral patterns relate to outcomes such as relational and sexual satisfaction across various identities. Adults in the comprehensive profile highlighted higher sexual and relational satisfaction, regardless of gender composition, indicating that affection-related outcomes are shaped more by behavior patterns than identity categories.

In Clark et al. (2025), gender identities are described as encompassing same-sex, mixed-sex, and gender-diverse relationships. This likely includes a broader spectrum of gender identities beyond the binary—such as nonbinary, transgender, and other identities—and reflects how these identities factor into relationship dynamics. These studies support the inclusion of intersectional and cultural dimensions in AET, emphasizing the importance of contextualizing affection within broader frameworks of identity and diversity.

== Critiques of AET ==
Some scholars have noted areas for the growth and refinement of AET. Månsson (2013) demonstrated AET's application to intergenerational contexts by testing the Grandchildren's Received Affection Scale (GRAS). The study revealed that young adults' trait-level receptivity to affection positively correlated with reported affection received from grandparents, and explored whether these dynamics varied by the grandparents’ biological sex or lineage.

This research validated AET's relevance in familial settings, yet also pointed to the need for more attention to gendered and cultural nuances. Graves et al. (2021) provided a more critical perspective, arguing that AET lacks a robust interactional account of affection. To address this, they developed an interaction-specific scale incorporating emotion, behavioral motivation, and relational message processing to enhance the theory's explanatory power. Graves et al. (2021) critique emphasizes AET's limited capacity to account for the fluid, context-dependent, and reciprocal nature of affection.
