= Sabrina Weill =

American journalist

Sabrina Solin Weill is an American journalist and online/print media consultant as CEO of Weill Media. Weill used to be editor-in-chief of Momlogic.com and Seventeen magazine and has written several books, including the 2006 parenting-advice book The Real Truth about Teens and Sex.

== Biography ==
She has a B.A. in creative writing from the University of California, Santa Cruz. She was the founding executive editor of teen magazine CosmoGIRL! for four years; the magazine was named Adweek's "Startup of the Year" in 2000. She had been a senior editor at Redbook and has served as an editor at the Scholastic teen health magazines Choices and Health Choices. Weill began her career as an editorial assistant at Seventeen, choosing letters for the "Sex and Body" column. She has appeared as an expert on parenting and teen issues on numerous national television shows including NBC's Today Show and CBS' The Early Show, and in dozens of papers including USA Today and The Washington Post. She founded ProjectAngelMom.com which encourages person-to-person charity (or micro-philanthropy) by publishing direct-donation information for the real people behind tragic news headlines.

== Publications ==
- The Seventeen Guide to Sex and Your Body; Simon & Schuster (1996)
- We’re Not Monsters: Teens Speak Out About Teens in Trouble; HarperCollins (2001)
- The Real Truth about Teens and Sex; Penguin (2006) excerpted in Time magazine
