= Multiple sex partners =

Engaging in sexual activities with two or more people

Multiple sex partners (MSP) is the measure and incidence of engaging in sexual activities with two or more people within a specific time period. Sexual activity with MSP can happen simultaneously or serially. MSP includes sexual activity between people of a different gender or the same gender.

MSP describes the behavior in clinical terms only. A similar term, promiscuity, may imply a moral judgement. The term polyamorous describes a behavior and not a measure of multiple sexual relationships at the same time.

A complete medical history includes a patient's social history and an assessment of the number of sexual partners they have had within a certain time period. Young people having MSP in the past year is an indicator used by the United States Centers for Disease Control and Prevention (CDC) in evaluating risky sexual behavior in adolescents and a tool for monitoring HIV/AIDS infection rates and deaths worldwide.

== Definitions and quantification ==
Epidemiologists and clinicians who quantify risks associated with MSP do so to identify those who have had sexual intercourse with more than one partner in the past 12 months. For the purposes of the World Health Organization (WHO)'s effort to eliminate HIV infection, quantifying measures progress in reducing the percentage of those with AIDS. The World Health Organization (WHO) has described their rationale by assuming that the spread of HIV in most locales depends upon the number of MSP. Those who have MSP possess a higher risk of HIV transmission than individuals that do not have multiple sex partners.

WHO uses indicators, such as MSP, age, mortality, morbidity, geographical location and signs and symptoms of disease. This is done so that change can be measured and so that the effect of indicators can be assessed.

Following the initial quantification of the number of MSP, the respondent is again surveyed three and then five years later. In addition to the survey, respondents' sexual histories are obtained. Analysis assists those conducting the study to verify and help define the term MSP.

For the indicator MSP, WHO has defined a summary of what it measures, rationale for the indicator, numerator, denominator and calculation, recommended measurement tools, measurement, frequency, and the strengths and weaknesses of the indicator.

WHO's definition of MSP has some strengths and weaknesses The quantification is an indicator and a picture of the levels of higher-risk sex in a locale. If those surveyed changed their activity to one sexual partner, the change will be quantified by changes in the indicator. This disadvantage is that though a respondent may reduce the number of MSP in a 12-month period, the indicator will not reflect this change in sexual activity. Even so, decreasing the number of MSP may not indicate a change. Potentially this definition and quantification may have a significant impact on the pandemic of HIV and used as a measure of program success. WHO recommends that additional indicators that quantify MSP more precisely to capture the reduction in multiple sexual partners in general.

According to the CDC's Youth Risk Behavior Surveillance System, having multiple sex partners has been quantified to mean that those age 25 or older had four or more sex partners in one year. In 2002, the CDC defined MSP for adolescents as having had four or more sex partners during one's lifetime.

Some clinicians define MSP by also taking into account concurrent sexual relationships.

=== Body count ===
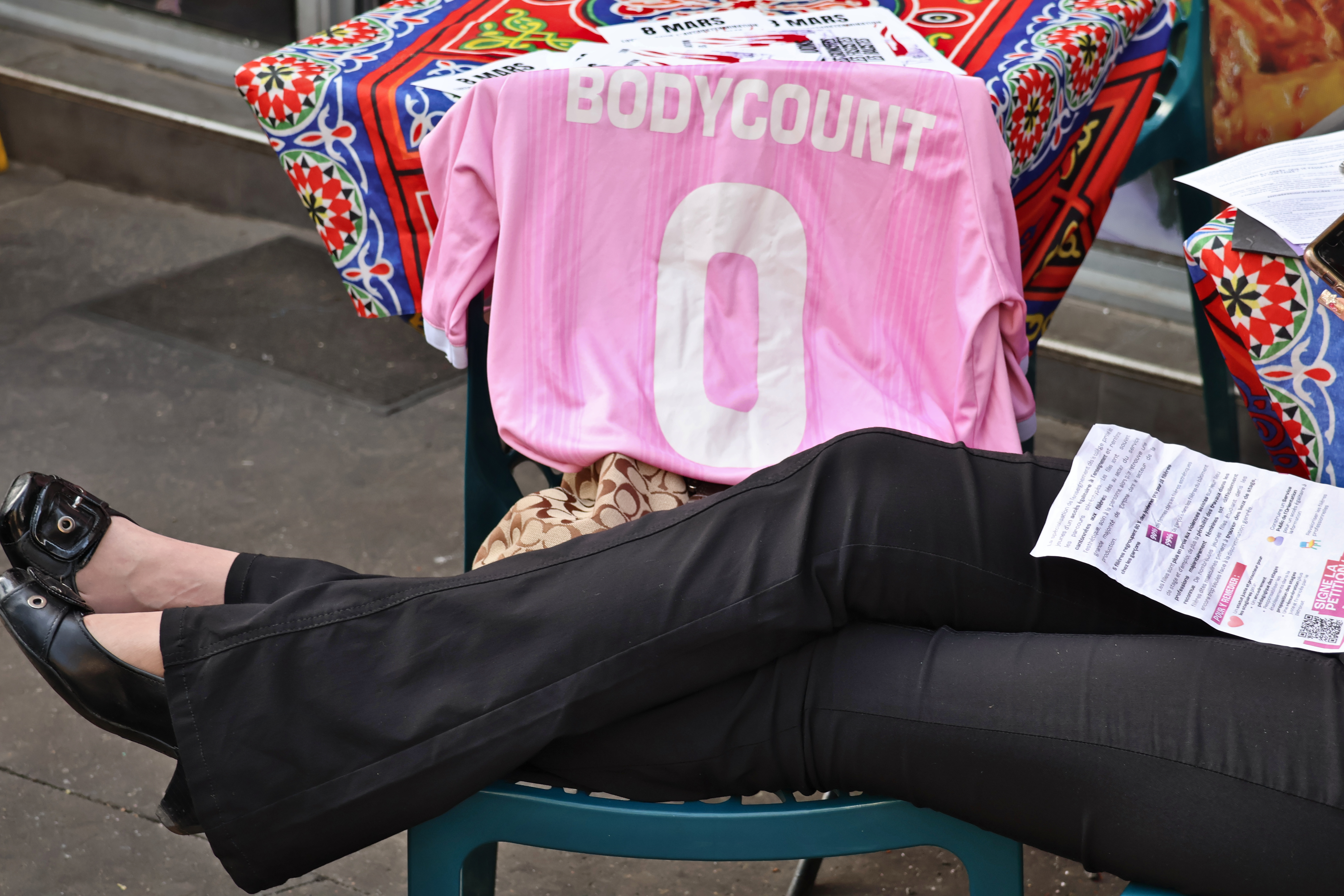
Demonstration for International Women's Day, March 8, 2026 in Paris.

Body Count
- Noun
- Meaning: Number of distinct person with whom one has had sexual intercourse with

Body count is a sexual slang term referring to the total number of people an individual has had sexual intercourse with over their lifetime. The term is frequently used in dating and social media, particularly on TikTok, with studies showing 25% of Americans conceal this number, while 16% understate it.

Body count was originally defined literally in a military context, being a count of (dead) bodies resulting from battles. This use was popularised during the Vietnam War. The meaning shifted over time to also refer to the number of people doing an activity. The usage of the term to refer to a number of sexual partners date back at least to 2004, as it was used in a film released that year. The word is used commonly in Namibia, India, the United States and UK. According to Google NGram, the phrase gained popularity during the 1960s and reached its peak in 2010.

== Other examples ==
Epidemiologists in Tanzania used the indicator MSP in their study of AIDS incidence among 15–19-year-olds by documenting the respondent as being sexually active and having MSP in the last 12 months.

== Prevalence ==
A Durex Global Sex Survey found that men in New Zealand had claimed an average of 44 sex partners over their lifetime.

In a 2019 survey, data showed that the average number of partners varies, with men and women reporting different averages (6.4 for men, 7 for women).

The average "body count" for adults aged 30–44 is approximately 8 for both men and women, with over half (56–58%) having more than five partners. While averages vary by region—around 10–11 in the U.S.. Turkey leads in some reports, with an average of 14.5 to 18.5, followed by Australia (13.3), New Zealand (13.2), and Iceland (13.0). Other countries with high averages include Finland (12.4), Norway (12.1), and Italy/Sweden (11.8).

An analysis of the National Family Health Survey-5 (NFHS-5) conducted between 2019 and 2021 by the International Institute for Population Sciences, Indian men were found to have the highest mean number of lifetime sexual partners in India.

In Jamaica, a 2004 Behavioral Surveillance Survey demonstrated that 89 percent of males and 78 percent of females aged 15 to 24 had sex with a nonmarital or noncohabitating partner in the preceding 12 months. Fifty-six percent of males and 16 percent of females had multiple sex partners in the preceding 12 months.

According to some unidentified poll results reported by the Steve Harvey Radio Show in January 2026, Gen Z adults (typically defined as those born between 1997 to 2012), who were the youngest group surveyed in the poll, prefer partners with one to two previous partners. Millennials between the ages of 30 and 45 are more flexible and say three to five past partners is fine. Of course the number of sexual partners that a person has had in their lifetime cannot decrease as a person gets older, so lower numbers would naturally be associated with younger people.

MSP is increasing due to shifting social norms, greater sexual liberty, and the rise of hookup culture. Increased opportunities via dating apps, reduced stigma and a greater emphasis on personal exploration.

== Health risks ==
The likelihood of developing substance abuse or dependence increases linearly with the number of sex partners, an effect more pronounced for women. People who have a higher number of sex partners do not have higher rates of anxiety or depression.

MSP is statistically associated with an increased risk of contracting sexually transmitted infections including HIV, syphilis, HPV and, in some studies, a higher risk of developing cancer. Key health risks include unprotected exposure, physical injury, and psychological impacts such as anxiety.

MSP increases the risk of developing bacterial vaginosis. MSP can result in pregnant women with a greater risk of contracting HIV. HIV is strongly associated with having MSP. Having multiple sex partners is associated with higher incidences of STIs.

Prevention of disease strategies include intensive counseling of those who have met the definition of multiple sex partners.

In Sub-Saharan Africa, travel and wealth is a risk factor in engaging in sexual activities with multiple sex partners.

== See also ==
- Cruising for sex
- Hookup culture
- Polyamory
- Sexual ethics
