= Sexual partner =

Person who engages in sexual activity with another one

Sexual partners are people who engage in sexual activity together. The sexual partners may be in a committed relationship, either on an exclusive basis or not, or engage in the sexual activity on a casual basis. They may be on intimate terms (in which case they are often referred to as "lovers") or anonymous, as in the case of sex with a stranger, a one-night stand, or a prostitute. A person can be another person's sexual partner even if the sexual activity is illegal, socially taboo, or otherwise in breach of a trust or commitment. A person may have only one or more than one sexual partner at any one time, either as polyamory, polygamy or in contravention of convention. These non-traditional l structures of romantic relationships are classified as Ethical Non-Monogamy (or consensual Non-Monogamy)

As such, the term sexual partner can be applied to both consenting and non-consenting sexual relationships.

A sexual partner may or may not have equal power during a sexual activity; such sexual "roles" (which can sometimes be determined by personality type but can also be determined by a conscious choice by the individual to "assume" a particular "role") typically fall under various dominance and submission categories.

The meaning of sexual partner should not be confused with the term romantic partner. A sexual partner and romantic partner can be the same person but are two exclusive domains of partnership: non-sexual romance (think dating, fawning, quality time, wooing) versus a partnership whose defined role is to support the fulfillment of physical and sexual intimacy. There are many healthy reasons why people choose to have non-romantic sexual partners. As referenced by romance expert, Dr. Bathurst, sexual need fulfillment is appropriate when both partners agree on the need that sex fulfills during each experience: pain alleviation, spiritual awakening, playfulness, self-expression, strengthen attachment bonds, etc.

== Terminology ==
Generally, a sexual partner is one with whom one engages in a sexual activity on a regular or ongoing basis.

An ex-sexual partner is a person with whom the other partner does not intend to engage in any further sexual activity, while a prospective sexual partner is one with whom the person has not previously engaged in any sexual activity, but desires to do so.

== See also ==
- Multiple sex partners
- Body count
