= More: A Memoir of Open Marriage =

2024 memoir by Molly Roden Winter

- Author: Molly Roden Winter
- Language: English
- Subject: Memoir
- Genre: Nonfiction
- Publication date: January 16, 2024
- Publication place: United States
- Pages: 304
- ISBN: 978-0385549455

More: A Memoir of Open Marriage is a 2024 memoir by Molly Roden Winter which details her exploration of non-monogamy.
