= Back-up partner =

Event

A back-up partner, standby lover, or spare-tyre lover is a person anticipated as a potential future romantic/sexual partner in the event of the failure or unforeseen end of a current relationship. The main purpose of maintaining a back-up partner is to avoid ending up alone and heartbroken after breaking up with another lover.

The term "spare-tyre lover" (爱情备胎), has become popular on the Internet in China. A study from 2014 found that Facebook users in relationships often used the site to maintain platonic friendships they felt could become replacement relationships if required, with men having such contacts at roughly twice the rate of women.

== Social context ==
An unstable current relationship may lead people to seek back-up lovers, particularly long-distance relationships. Some people gain personal confidence from having a back-up lover, appreciating the fact that they are being admired by more than one person.

== See also ==
- Mate choice
- Strategic pluralism
- Friend zone
