= Yes no maybe list =

Tool for communicating with sexual partners

A yes no maybe list or a yes no maybe checklist is a list of sexual activities and other information designed for sexual partners to better communicate and understand each other's desires and limitations. Typical use of such a list is each partner fills out a questionnaire naming a sexual act and checks 'yes' for interested in that act, 'no' for not interested and 'maybe' for maybe interested. It can also note as to whether the partners want to be giving or receiving and other information such as sexual trauma triggers or safe words. Such lists are common in BDSM communities and are separately also popular with sex therapists for their clients to improve communication.

Lists such as these have been made into apps and online tools, such as Spicer and have been used as a means of measuring sexual consent.

== Formats and contemporary usage ==
Yes/No/Maybe lists exist in multiple formats, including paper-based worksheets, therapist-guided exercises, and digital tools. Traditionally, these lists have been used as printed questionnaires completed individually by partners before discussing their responses together in a facilitated or self-guided conversation. Yes/No/Maybe-style frameworks have also been adapted into digital formats, such as mobile applications and online questionnaires. These tools typically allow partners to respond privately and compare answers afterward, with the goal of supporting communication while reducing performance pressure or discomfort during in-person discussions. Across formats, the emphasis remains on communication rather than prescription, with the lists serving as prompts for dialogue rather than as fixed agreements or measures of obligation.

== Use in therapeutic and consent contexts ==
Yes no maybe lists are commonly used as communication tools in sex therapy and counseling to help partners articulate desires, boundaries, and areas of uncertainty in a structured, low-pressure way. Rather than prescribing specific outcomes, these lists support dialogue by normalizing differences in interest and emphasizing consent as an ongoing process rather than a single agreement. In addition to therapeutic practice, Yes/No/Maybe-style frameworks have been examined in academic research related to sexual consent, communication patterns, and behavioral intention measurement.
