= Contact (computer dating) =

Early computerized dating service

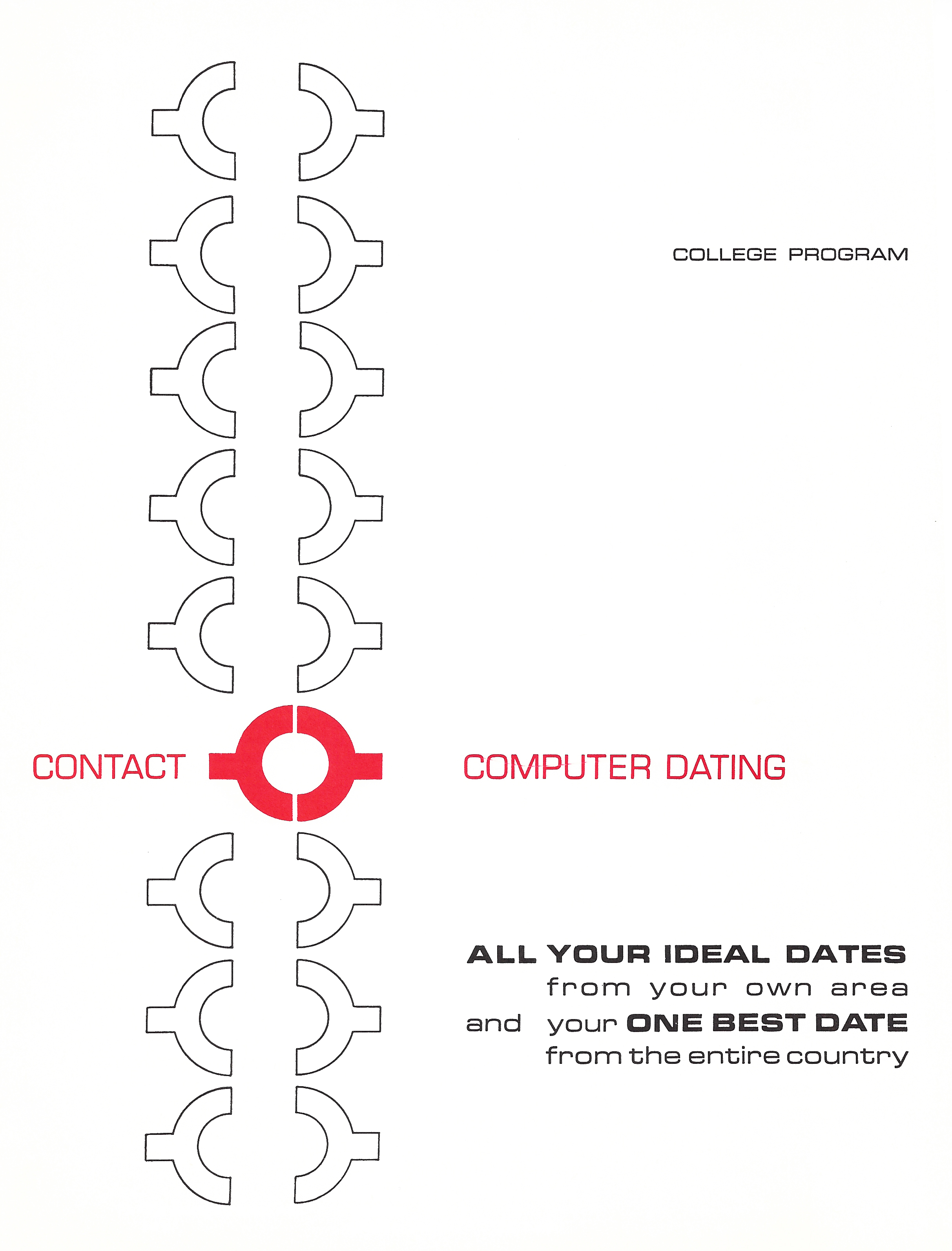
- Founded: 1965
- Founder: David Dewan
- Headquarters: Boston, Massachusetts
- Area served: United States colleges and universities
- Services: Computer dating

Contact was one of the first computer dating services, founded in 1965 by David Dewan when he was a student at the Massachusetts Institute of Technology (MIT).

Contact participants answered 100 questions about themselves and their ideal dates and mailed completed reply forms with a $4 processing fee to Boston. The company used a computer to compare responses and mailed each person a computer-printed letter listing all their recommended dates.

Contact competed directly with Operation Match for the college dating market. Historian Dan Slater wrote "The idea is so big, so fresh, that both sides are sure there's a fortune to be made. The question is who will nail down the market first." These two companies pioneered ideas that would later shape the multibillion-dollar online dating industry.

== History ==
Contact started in 1965 for New England area colleges and expanded nationwide in 1966.

=== Founding and launch (1965) ===
David Dewan graduated from MIT in June 1965 with a degree in electrical engineering. After seeing Operation Match's initial test earlier that year, Dewan saw room for improvement. "I knew some guys were using a computer as a date-matching gimmick," he later recalled, "but I knew I could do better." He borrowed $10,000 from his grandparents to launch the company and over the summer of 1965 developed the Contact questionnaire and programmed a Honeywell 200 computer to enable the features he wanted to offer: prerequisites, multiple answers, values weighting, and two-way matching.

Contact positioned itself as a premium alternative and "entered the fledgling market with guns blazing." Dewan claimed in a Look magazine cover story that Operation Match's questionnaire was "less sophisticated" and predicted Contact would "sell far better at schools like Princeton and Harvard." This rivalry escalated when, on September 29, 1965, campus police ejected Dewan from Winthrop House at Harvard for distributing questionnaires without a permit, an incident that made front-page news in The Harvard Crimson.

Despite the setback, Contact got off to a fast start. An early distribution of questionnaires drew 11,000 responses at $4 each, generating $44,000 in revenue (over $400,000 in 2026 dollars).

=== National expansion (1966) ===
In 1966, Contact lowered its price to $3 and expanded across the country, distributing in 126 areas with large college populations.

To emphasize its size and national coverage, Contact now promised "ALL YOUR IDEAL DATES from your own area and your ONE BEST DATE from the entire country." The company also highlighted "Continuous Processing," promising more than the original five to fifteen dates, with additional dates sent automatically as the computer found them.

No independent sales figures are available. In marketing materials, Contact claimed to have "arranged just over 300,000 computer dates."

== 1965 materials ==
Contact distributed questionnaires and answer sheets as packages, either to every dorm room (if allowed) or at the dorm's front desk. The 1965 package included a cover letter, a four-page questionnaire, an answer sheet, and a pre-paid business reply envelope.

=== Questionnaire ===
Contact's 1965 questionnaire had 100 multiple-choice questions organized into six sections. Participants marked their answers in numbered boxes on a separate Reply Form. The questionnaire was printed in blue ink on cream-colored, textured paper.

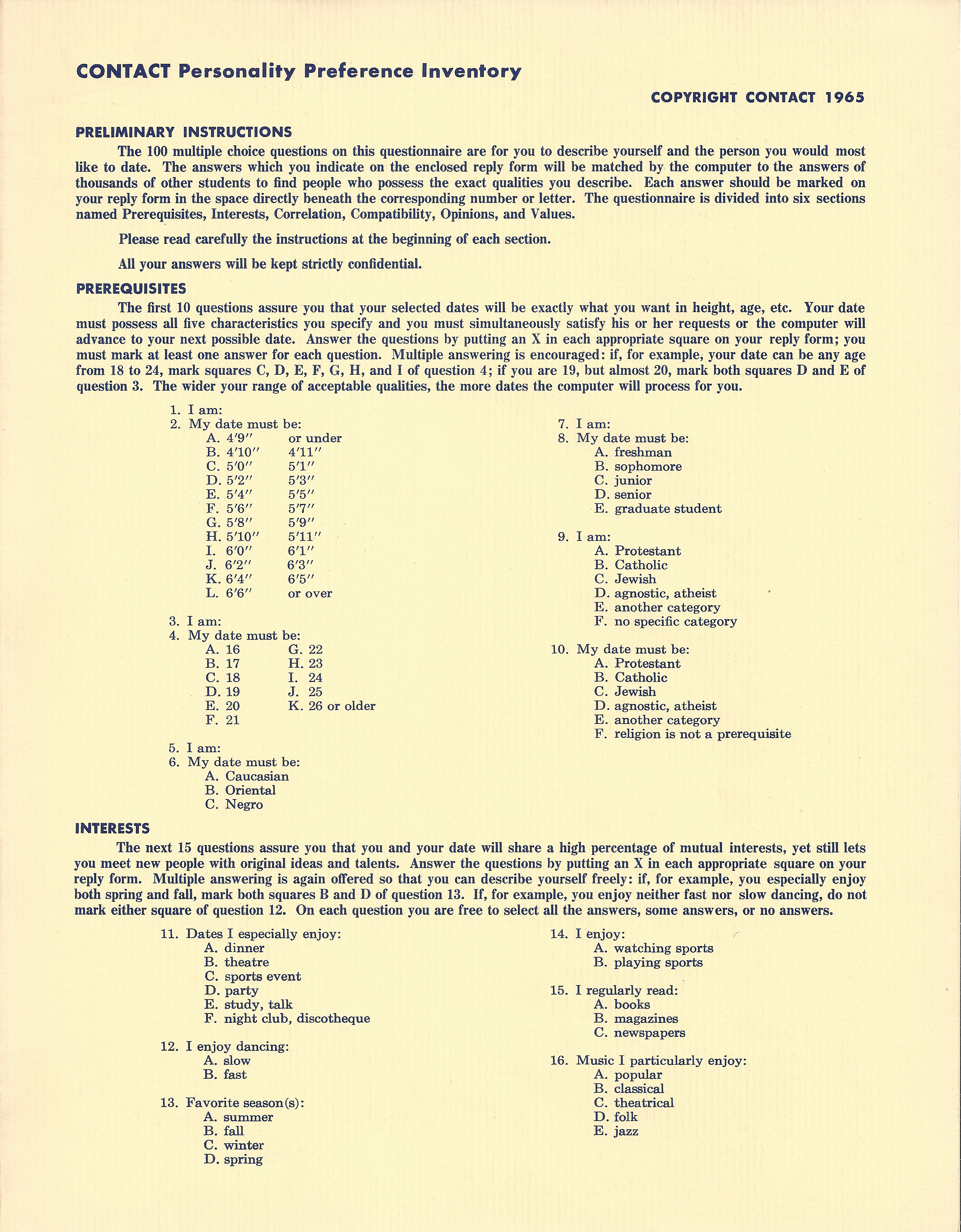

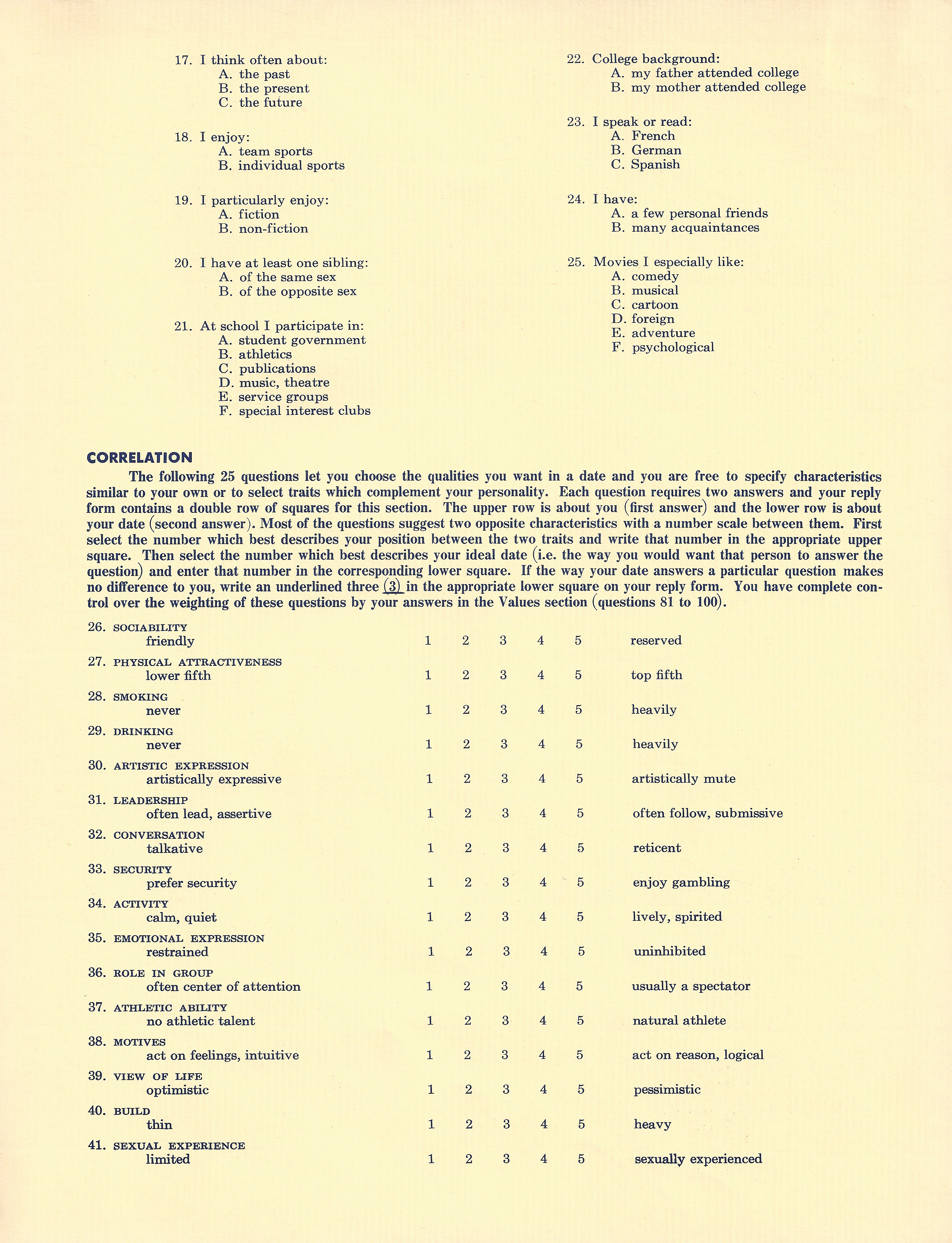

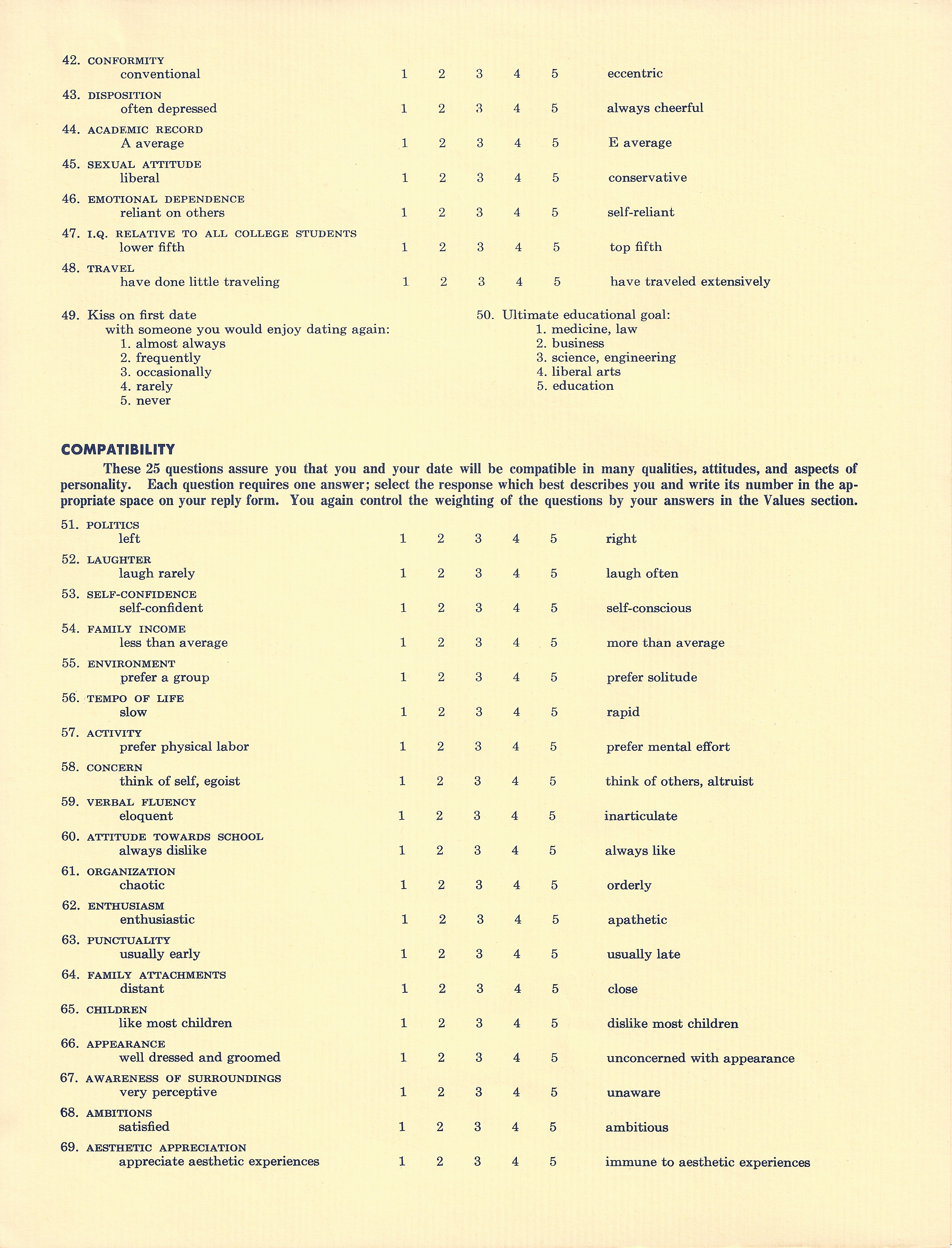

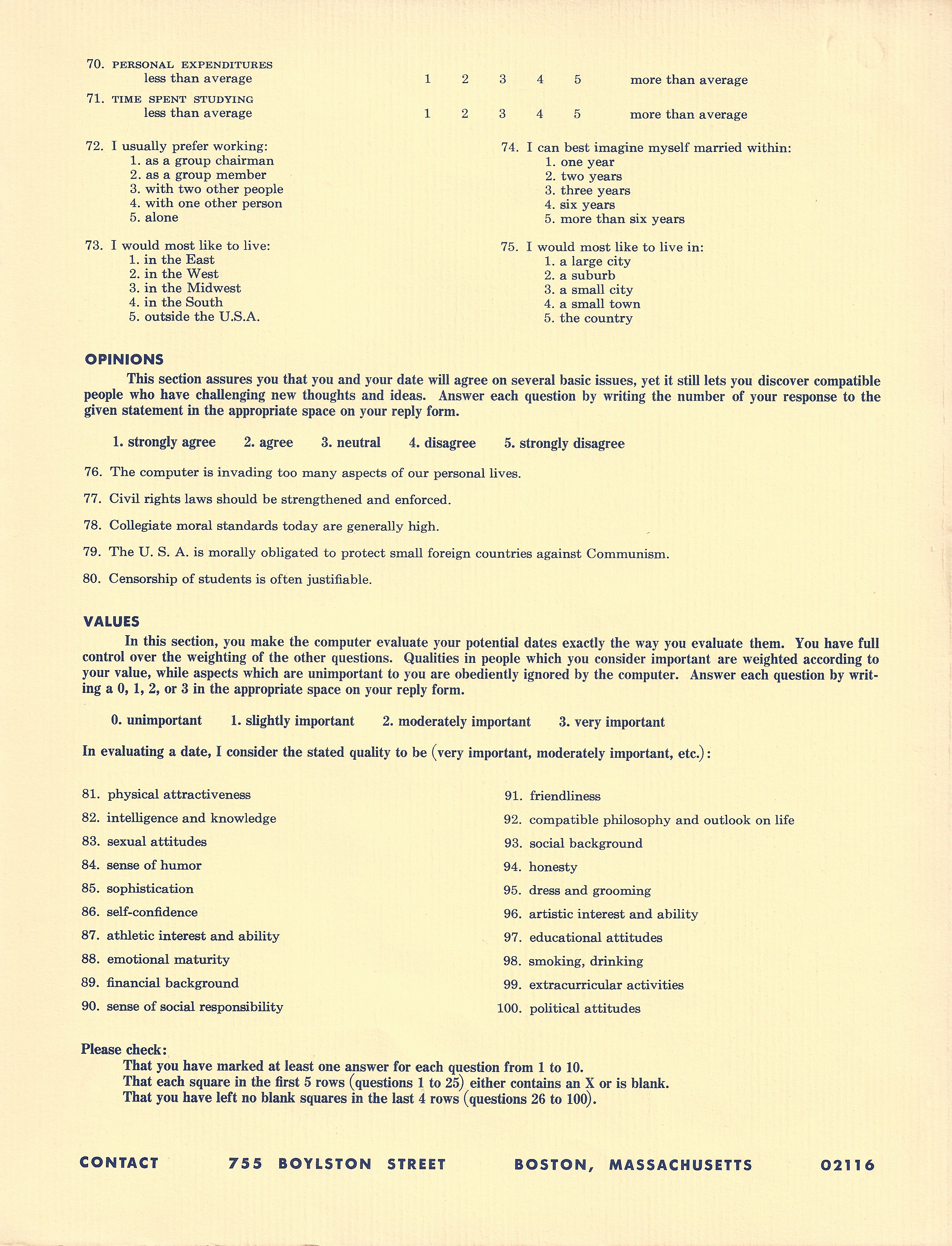

==== Prerequisites (questions 1–10) ====
The Prerequisites section established non-negotiable requirements. The computer would only evaluate a potential date's compatibility if both participants met each other's prerequisites. Contact's multiple-answering feature, however, provided flexibility so participants could specify a range of acceptable heights, ages, etc. Prerequisites covered height, age, race, class year, and religion.

==== Interests (questions 11–25) ====
The Interests section assessed shared interests and activities. Multiple answering was encouraged. For example, students who enjoyed watching sports as well as playing sports could mark both. Topics included music, movies, sports, and school activities.

==== Correlation (questions 26–50) ====
The Correlation section used a dual-response format. Each question presented a spectrum between two opposite characteristics with a 1–5 scale. Participants answered each question twice: once describing themselves and once describing their ideal date. The Values section (see below) enabled participants to rate the importance of each characteristic. Correlation topics included sociability, smoking, drinking, sexual attitude, and sexual experience.

==== Compatibility (questions 51–75) ====
The Compatibility section assessed personality alignment using a 1–5 scale format. Unlike Correlation questions (which allowed different preferences for self and date), these questions assumed that compatible dates should answer similarly. Topics included politics, sense of humor, ambition, children, and family income. The questionnaire reminded participants "You again control the weighting of the questions by your answers in the Values section."

==== Opinions (questions 76–80) ====
This brief but significant section asked participants to rate their agreement on a 1–5 scale with several controversial statements. Questions addressed privacy, civil rights, moral standards, Communism, and censorship.

==== Values (questions 81–100) ====
The Values section allowed participants to rate how important each quality was in selecting a date and the computer used these to control its processing. Qualities marked "Very Important" were weighted heavily while those marked "Unimportant" were ignored.

Participants could rate the importance of qualities such as physical attractiveness, intelligence, self-confidence, sense of humor, social background, and sexual attitudes.

=== Reply form ===
Each Contact participant filled out a Reply Form (answer sheet) and mailed it along with the $4 processing fee (described as "about the cost of a pair of movie tickets") in the included, postage-paid envelope. The company punched everyone's answers onto IBM cards and used a Honeywell 200 computer for processing.

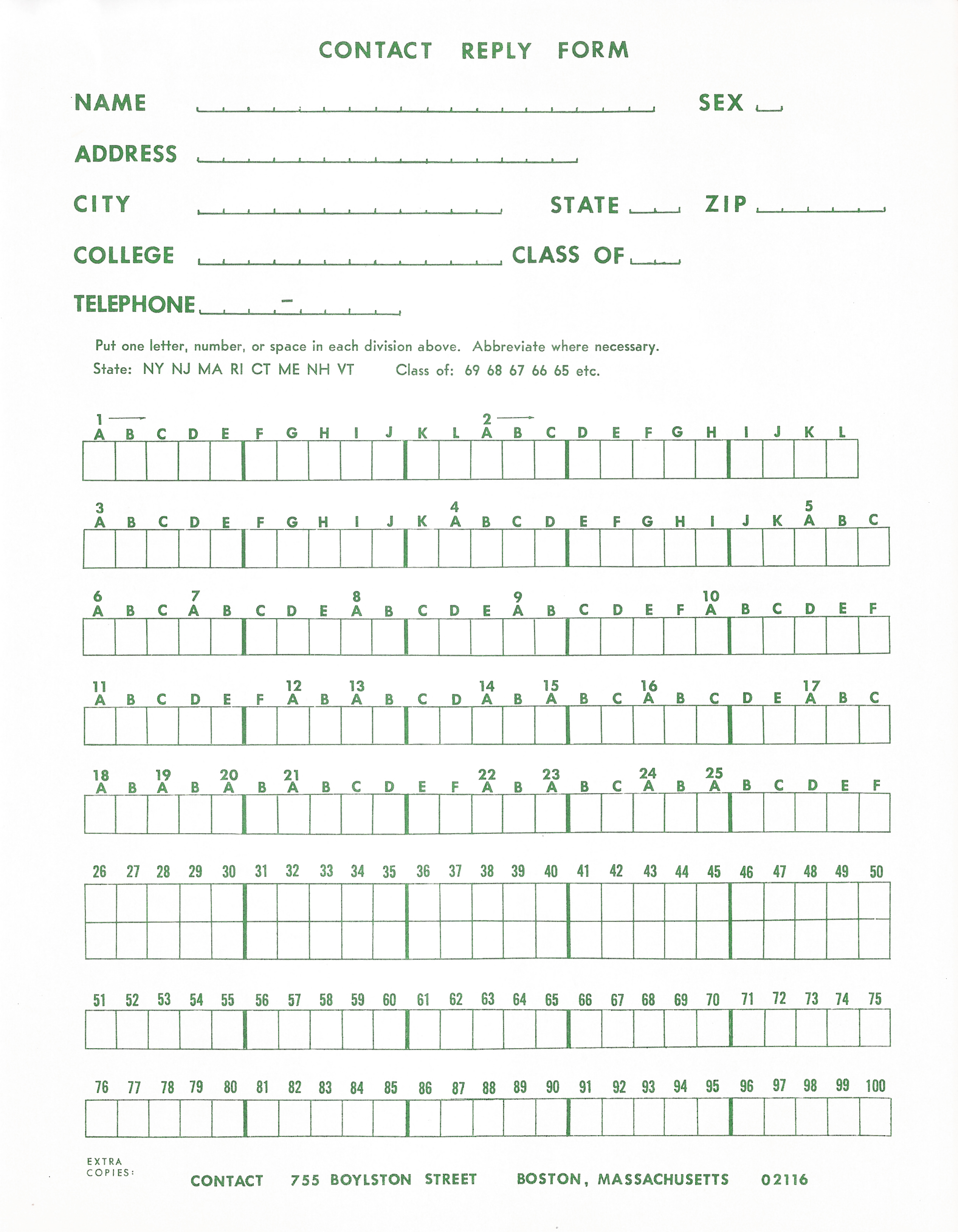
1965 reply form

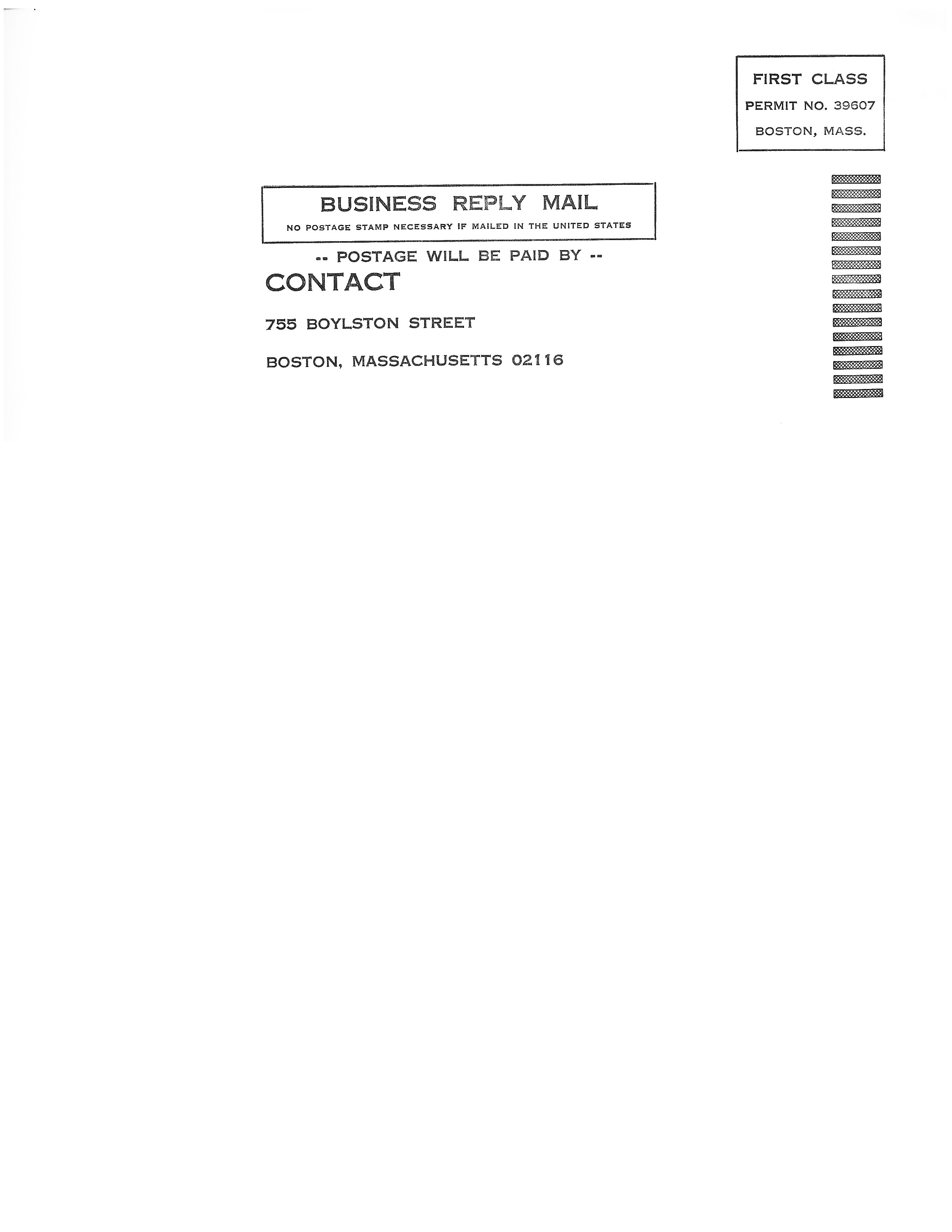
1965 reply envelope

=== Results letter ===
Contact mailed every participant a personalized computer-printed letter showing the name, address, college, class year, and phone number of all their ideal dates. The company emphasized that "Every person on your list of ideal dates also receives your name."

Contact deliberately left the sprocket holes down each side of the letter to highlight computer printing. Note the vertical misalignment of individual characters typical of a mid-1960s drum printer.

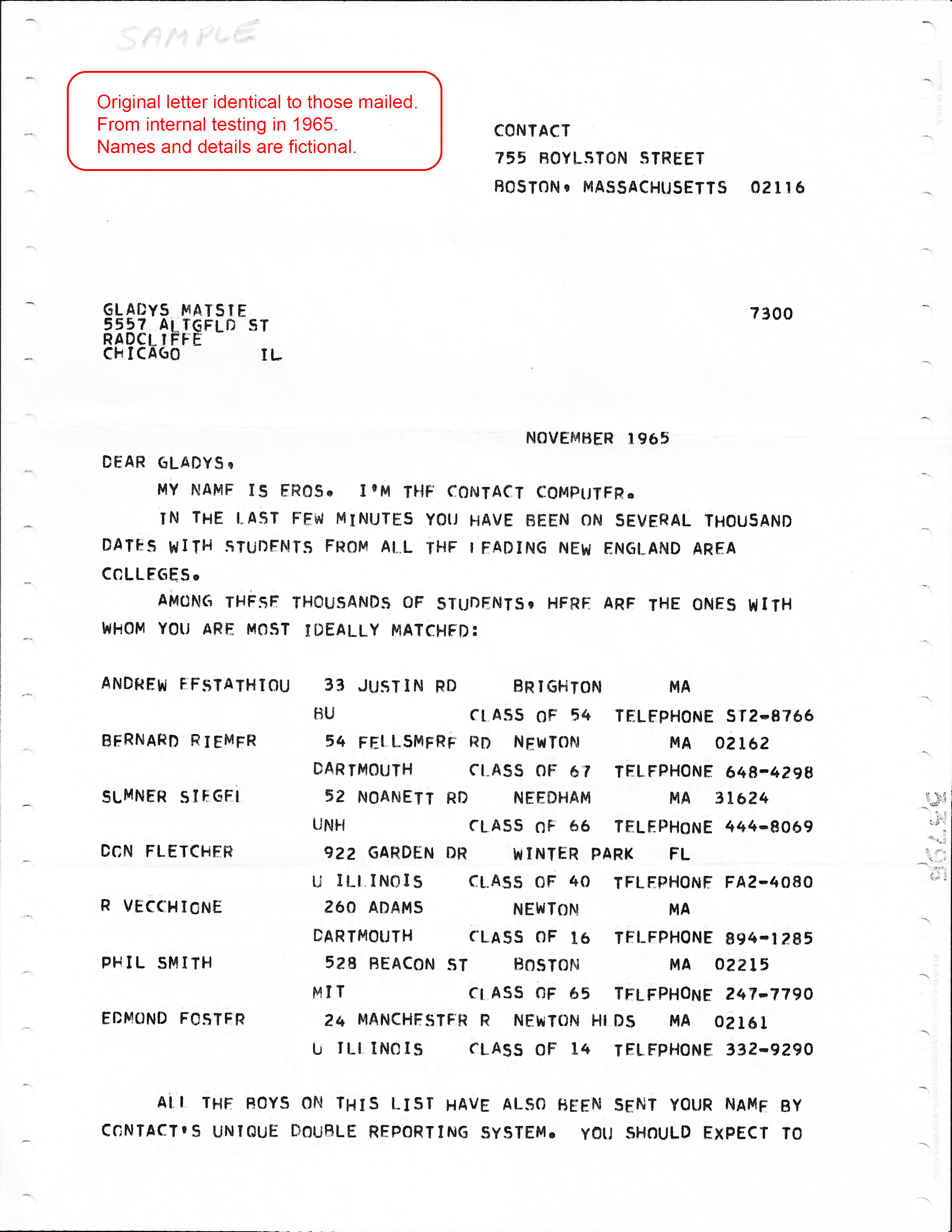
1965 letter page 1

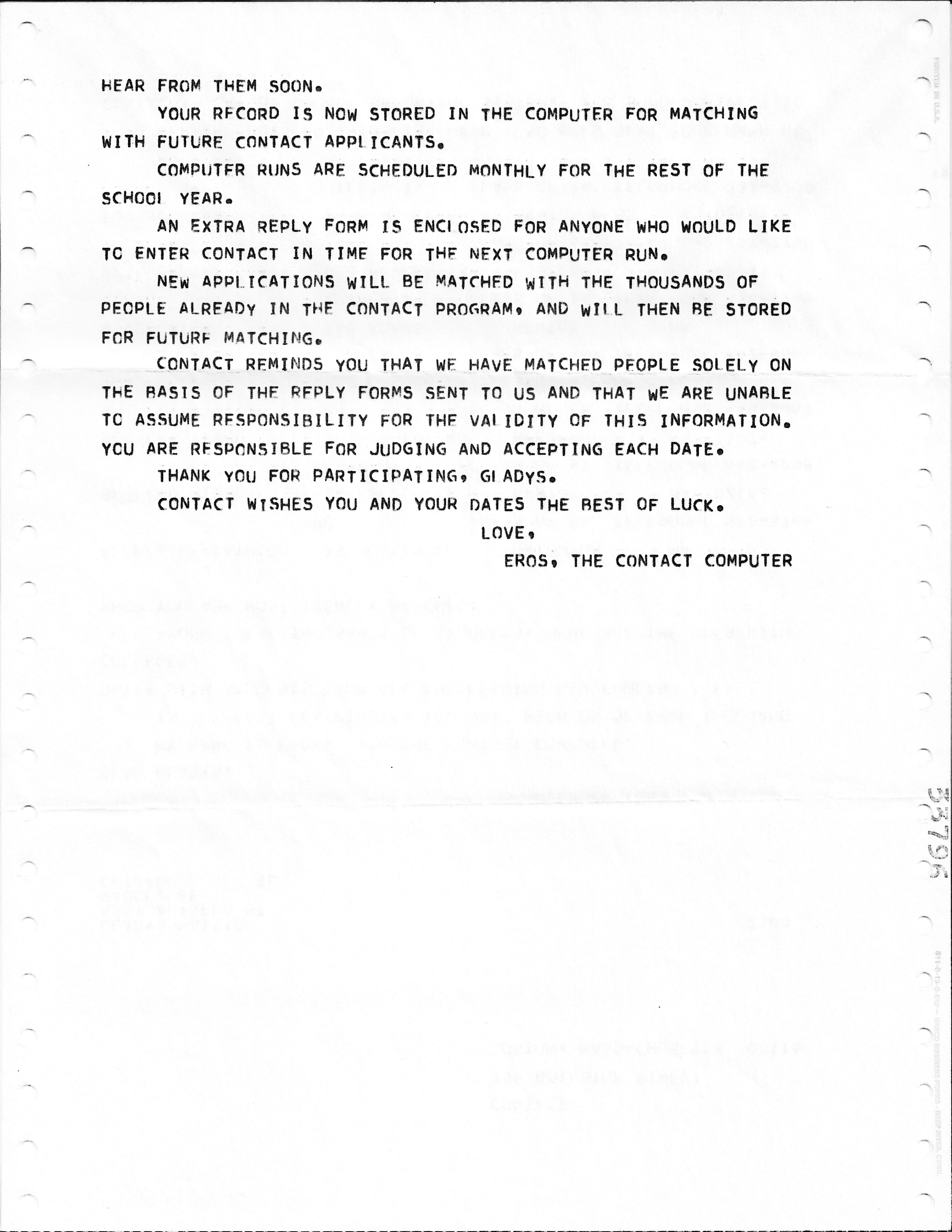
1965 letter page 2

=== Marketing and distribution ===
Contact's 1965 package included a cover letter, the four-page questionnaire, an answer sheet, and a pre-paid business reply envelope. There were four different cover letters, each emphasizing a different feature, and the company included one at random with each package so students would collectively learn about all Contact's benefits. The back of every cover letter was identical and included a summary of all Contact's features.

One cover letter observed "Another feature of Contact is simply the fun of calling or being called by someone whom some giant bundle of wires says you would enjoy dating. Preposterous!".

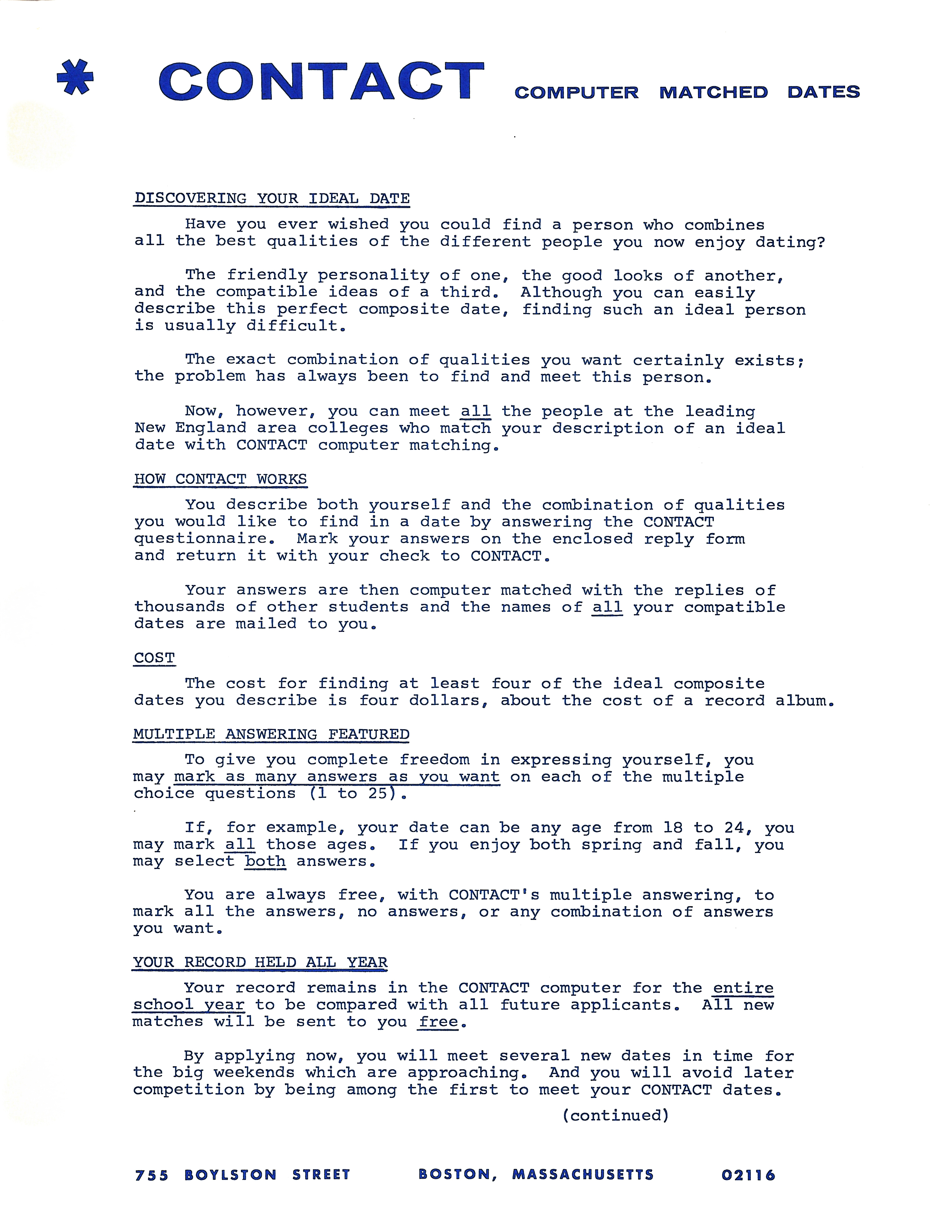
Cover letter A

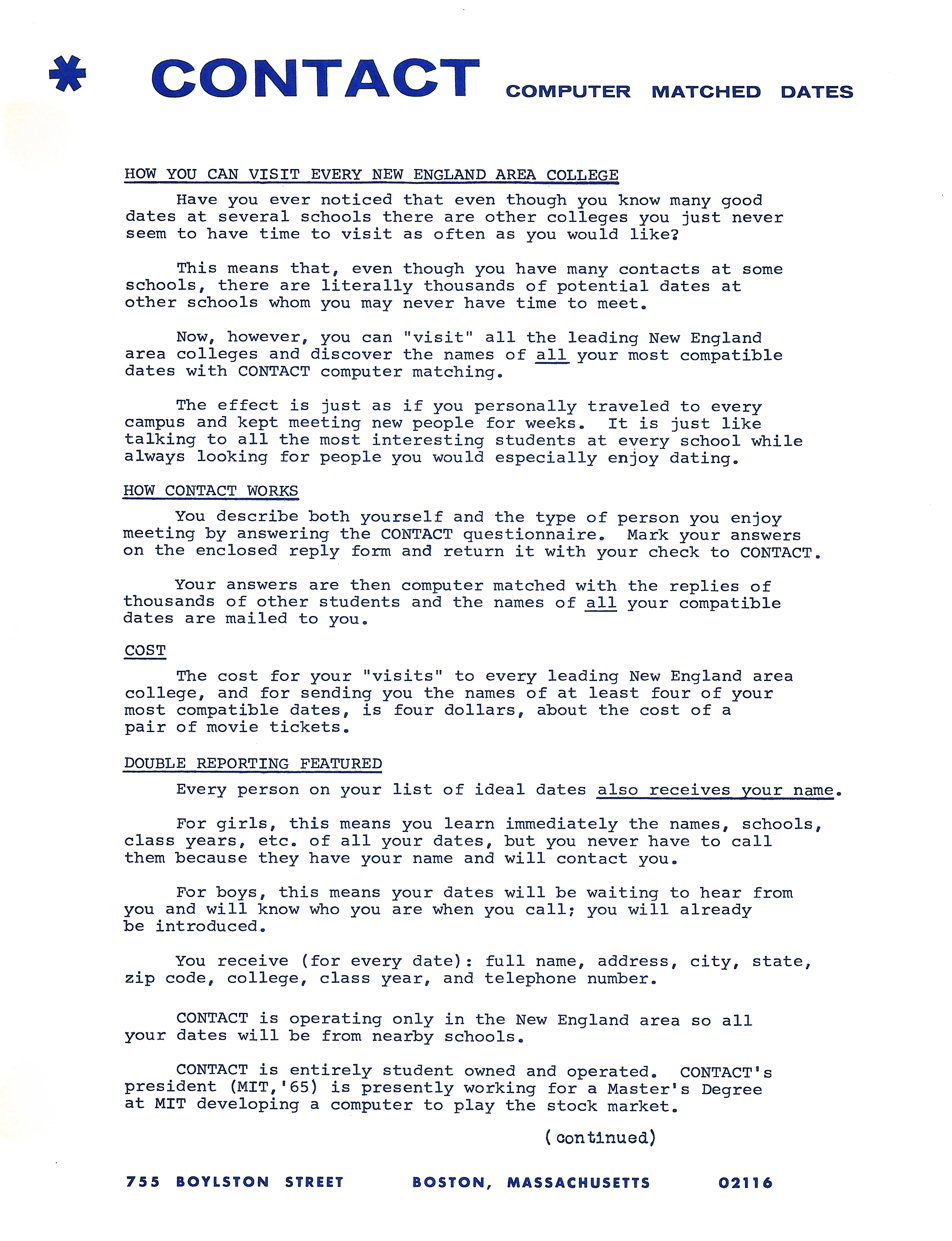
Cover letter B

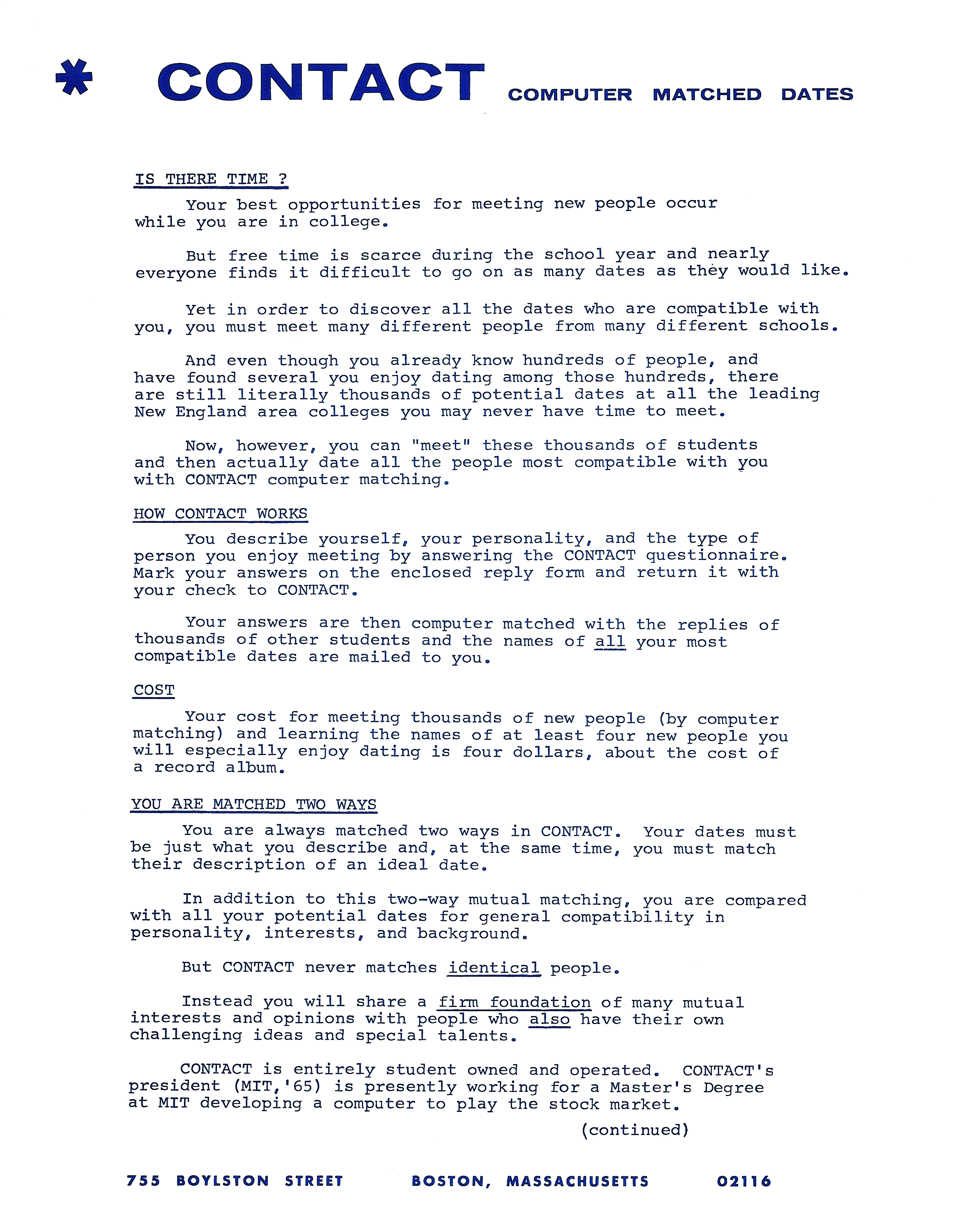
Cover letter C

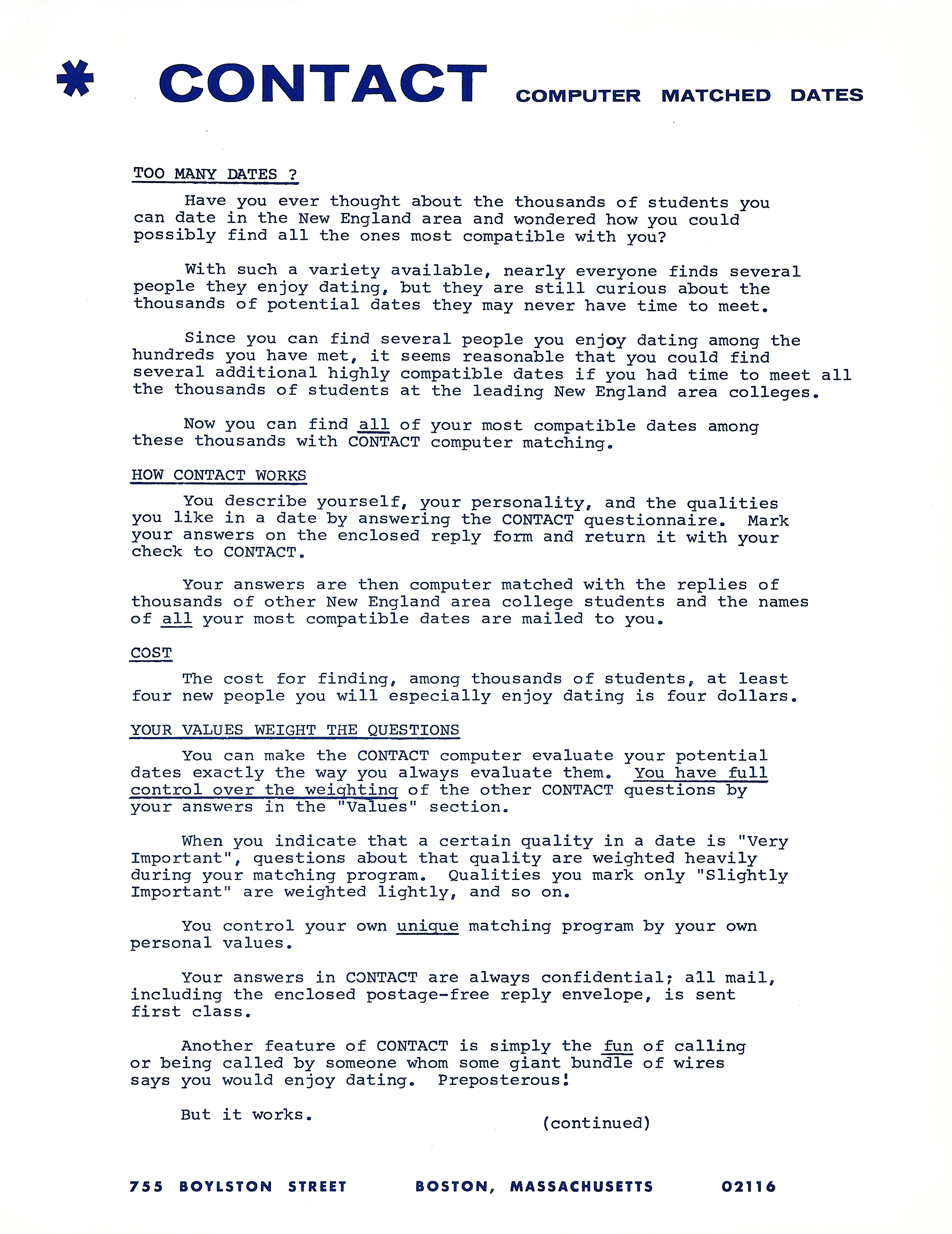
Cover letter D

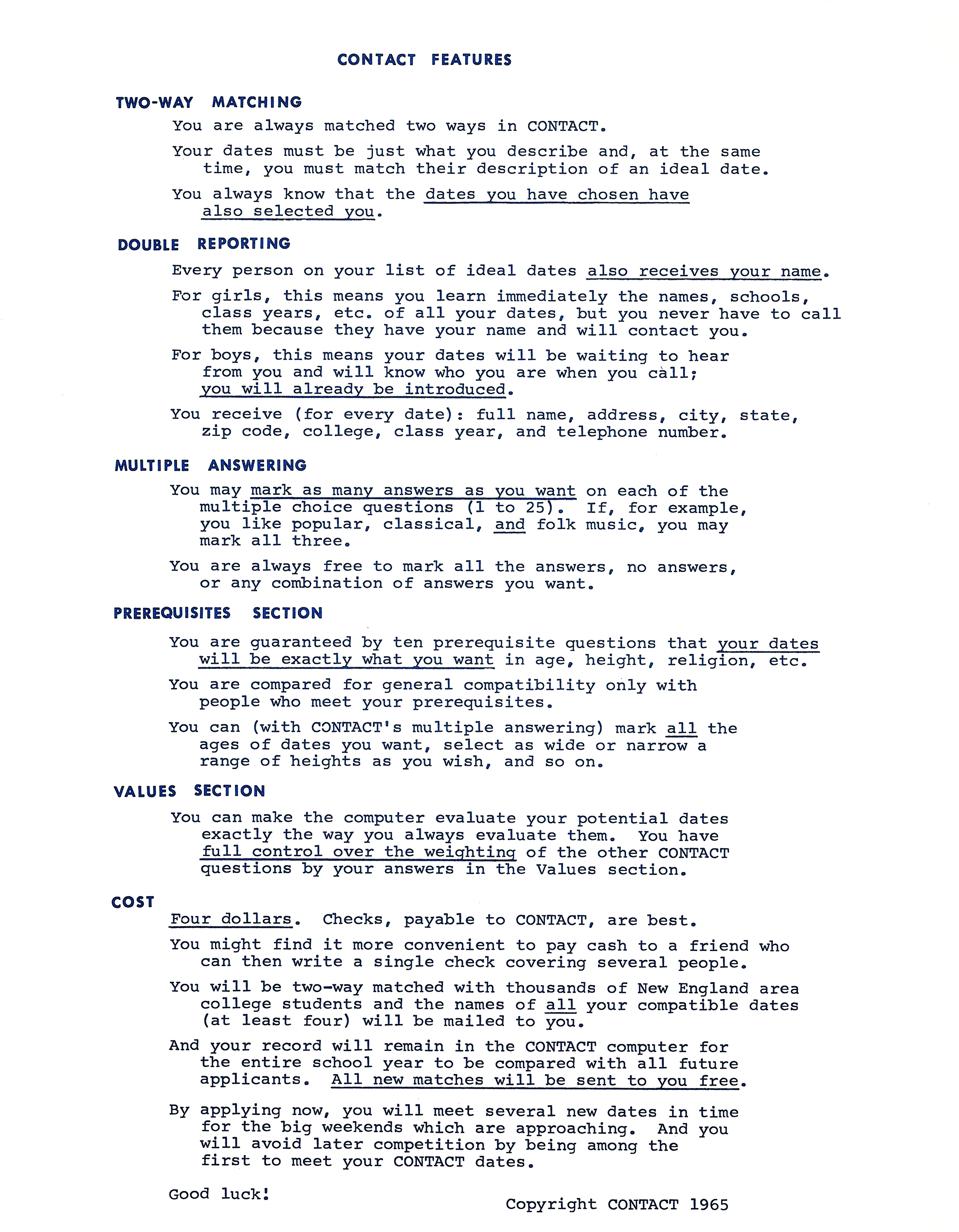
Cover letter back

== 1966 materials ==
For national distribution in 1966, Contact expanded its package to a 12-page booklet which included two pre-numbered Reply Forms bound inside. The front page featured a new logo and the back page listed 126 regional codes for cities and towns with large college populations.

=== Questionnaire ===
Contact's 1966 questionnaire had 100 questions printed in a multi-page booklet.

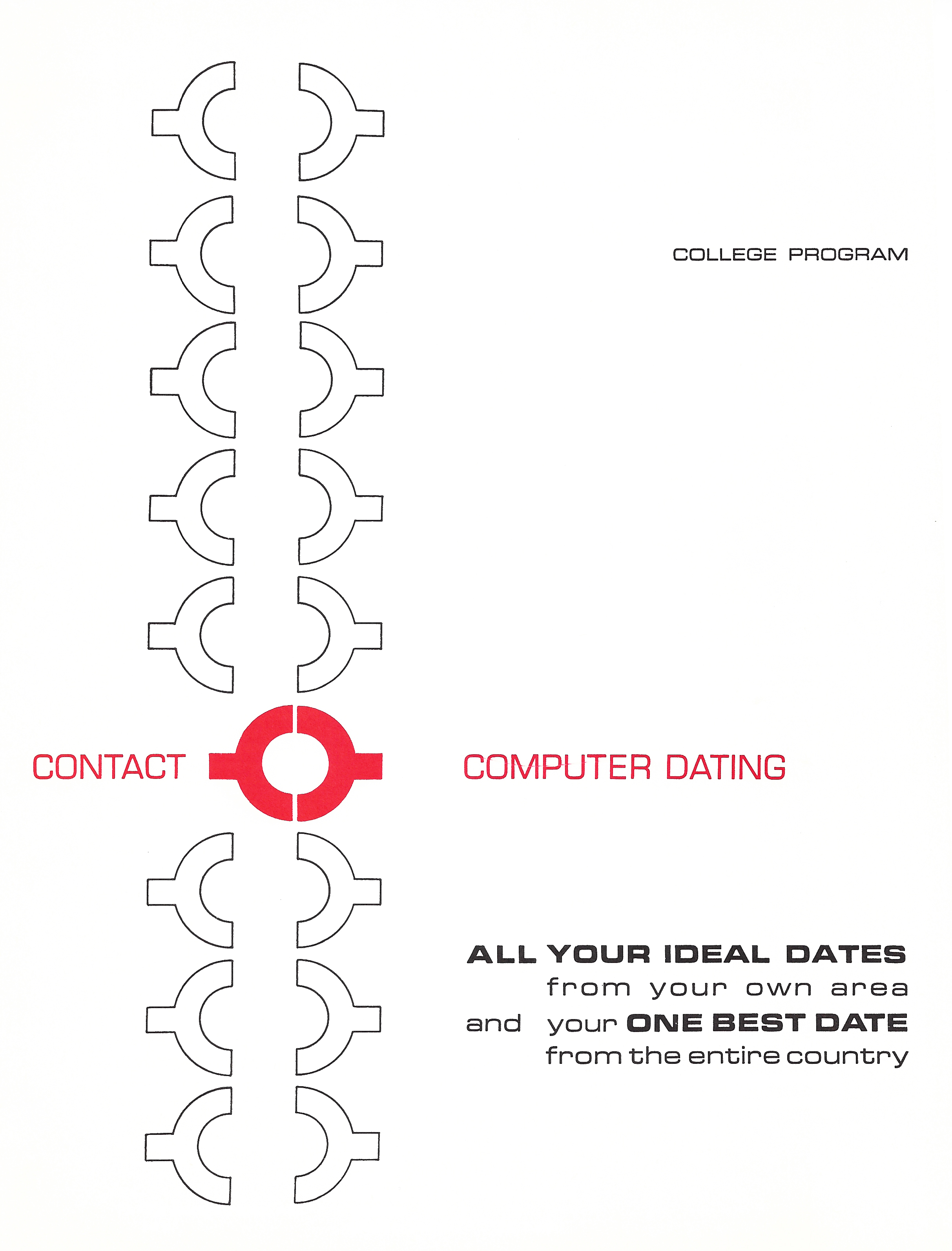

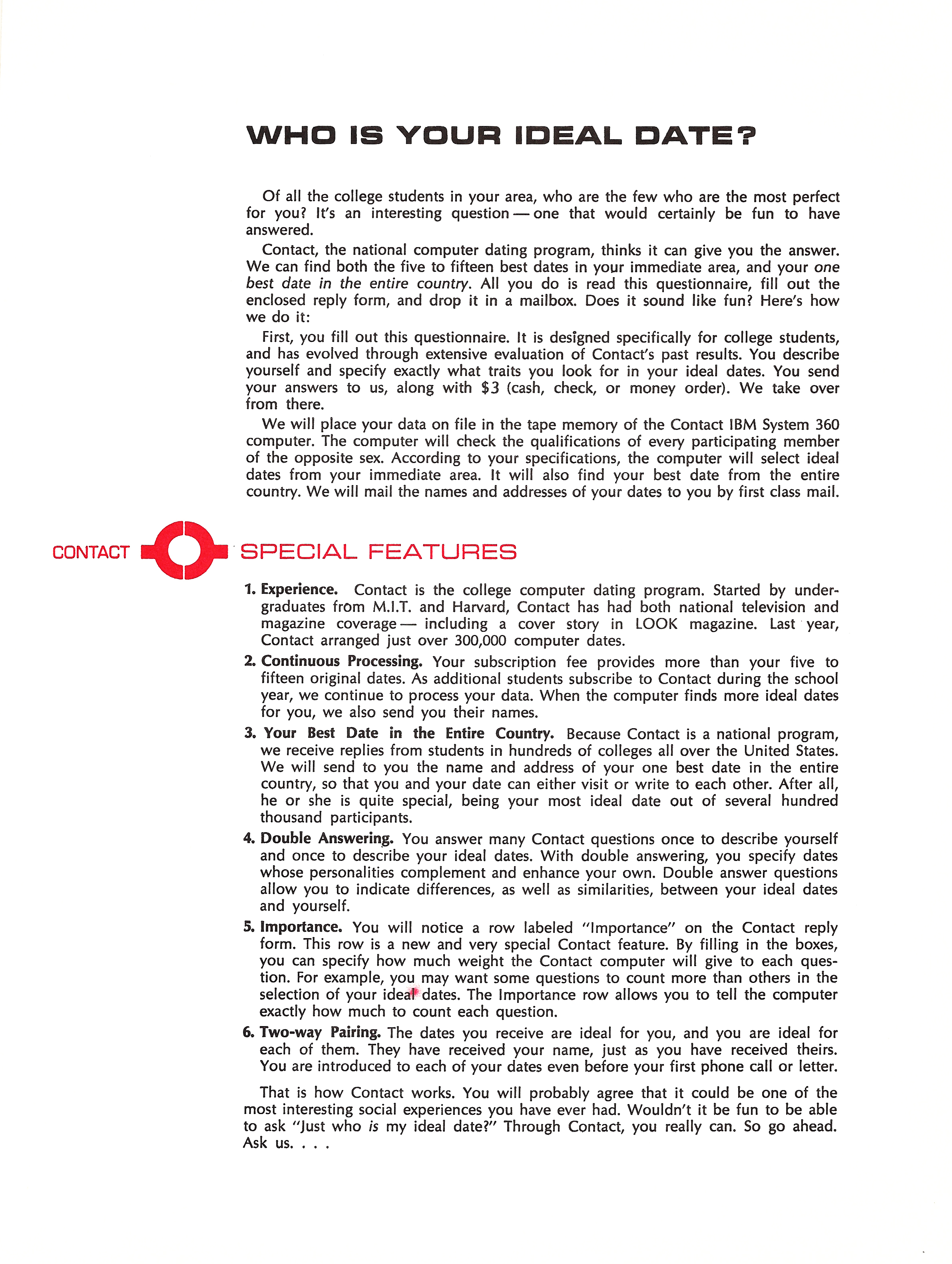

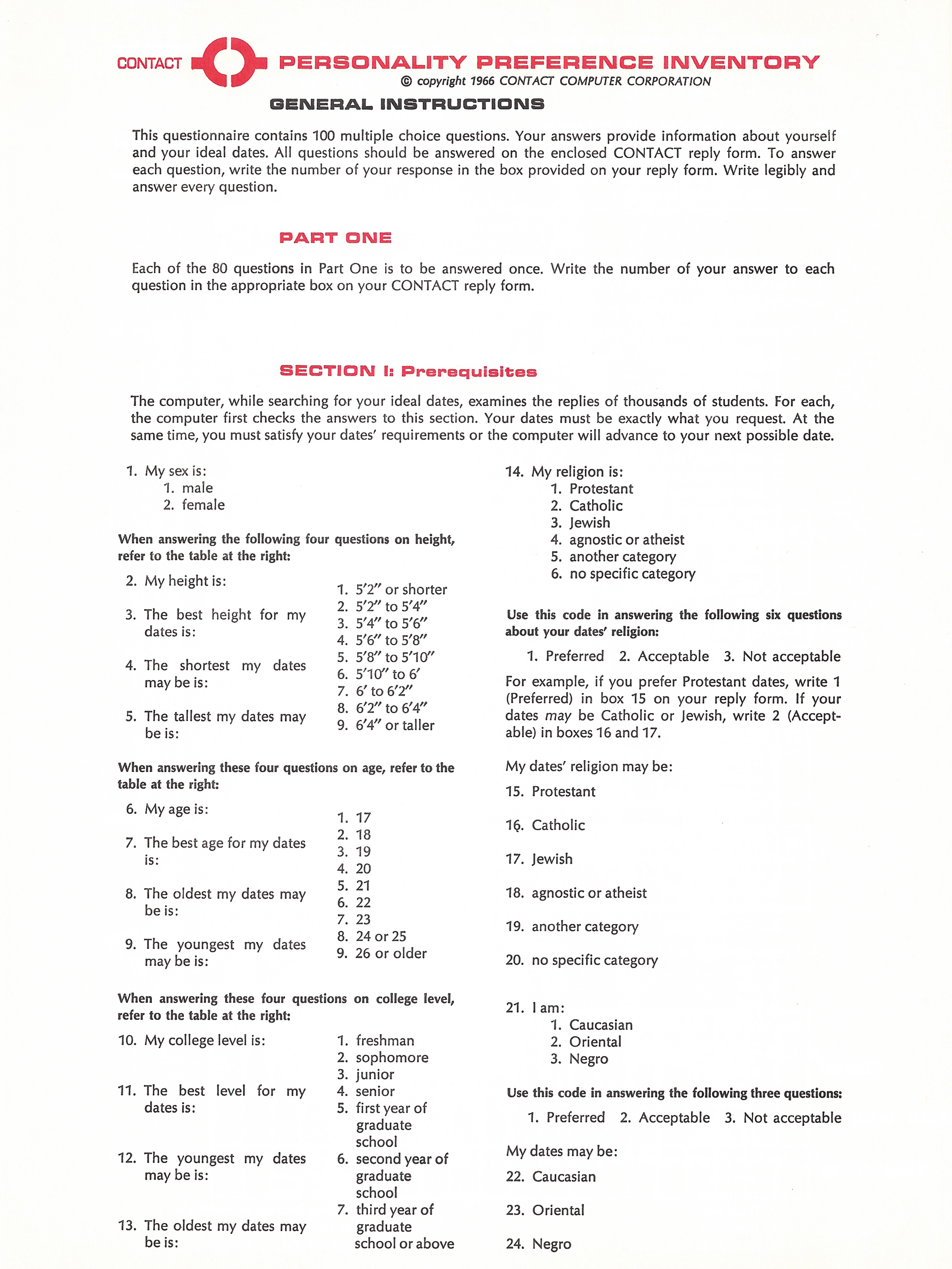

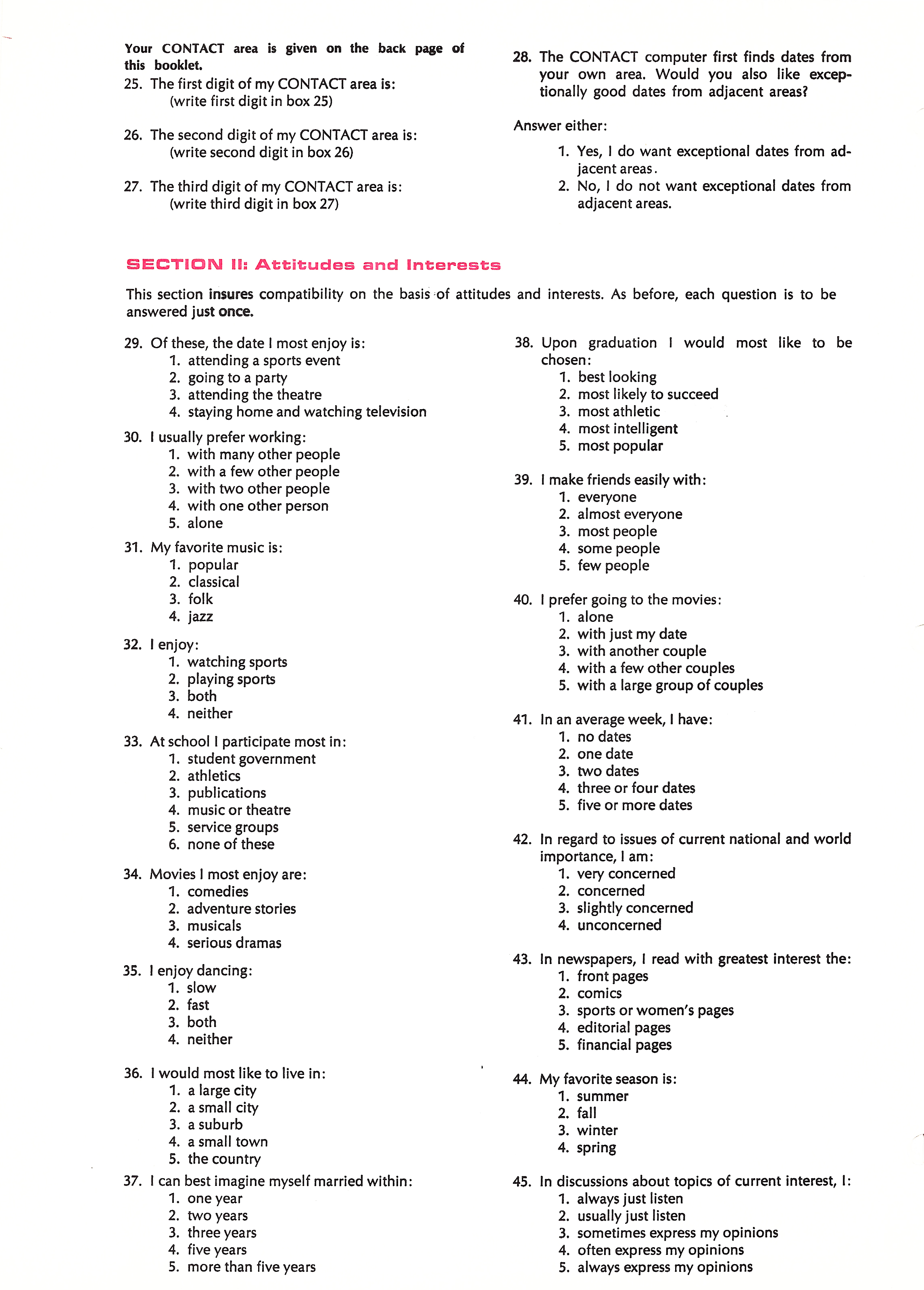

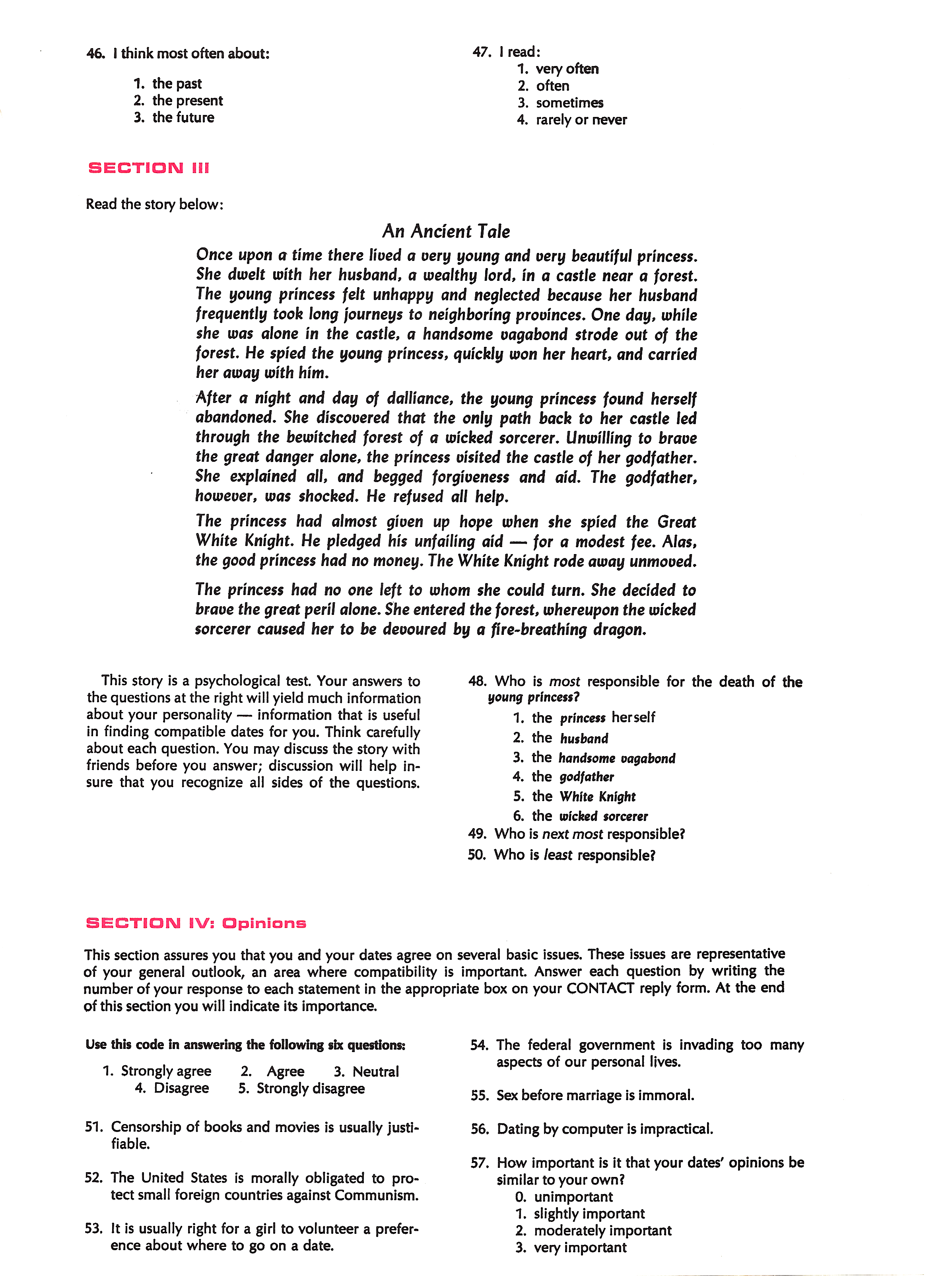

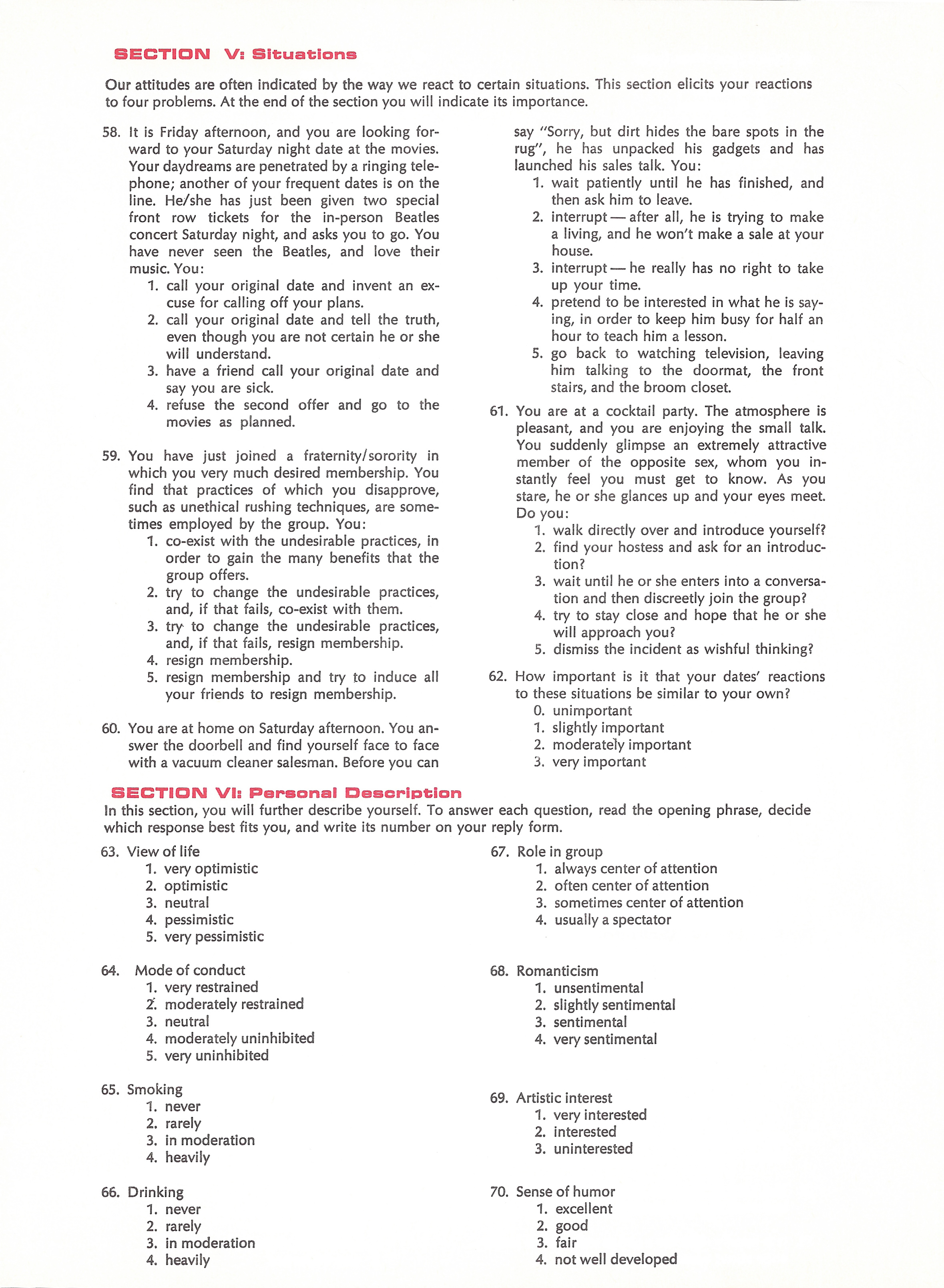

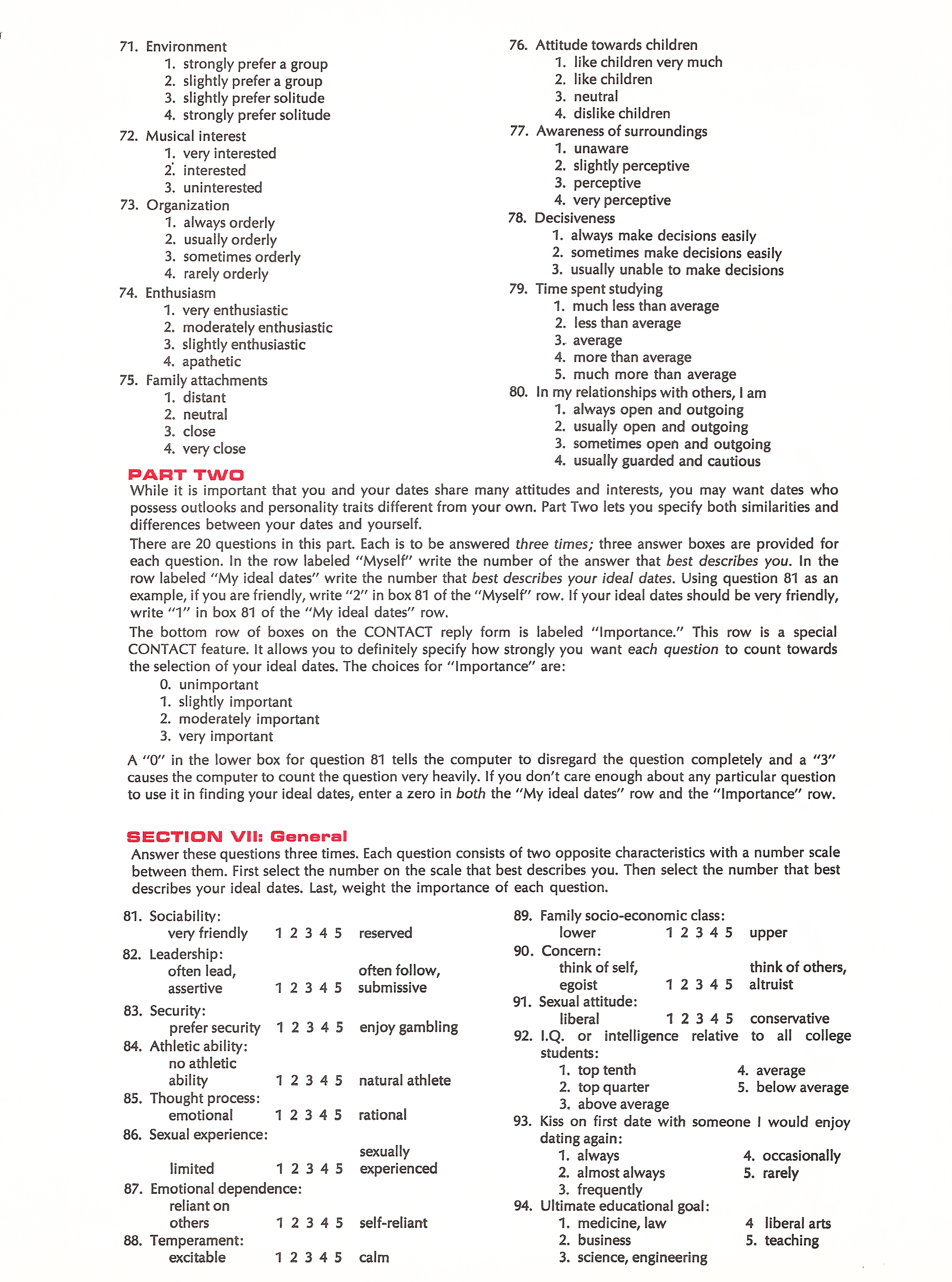

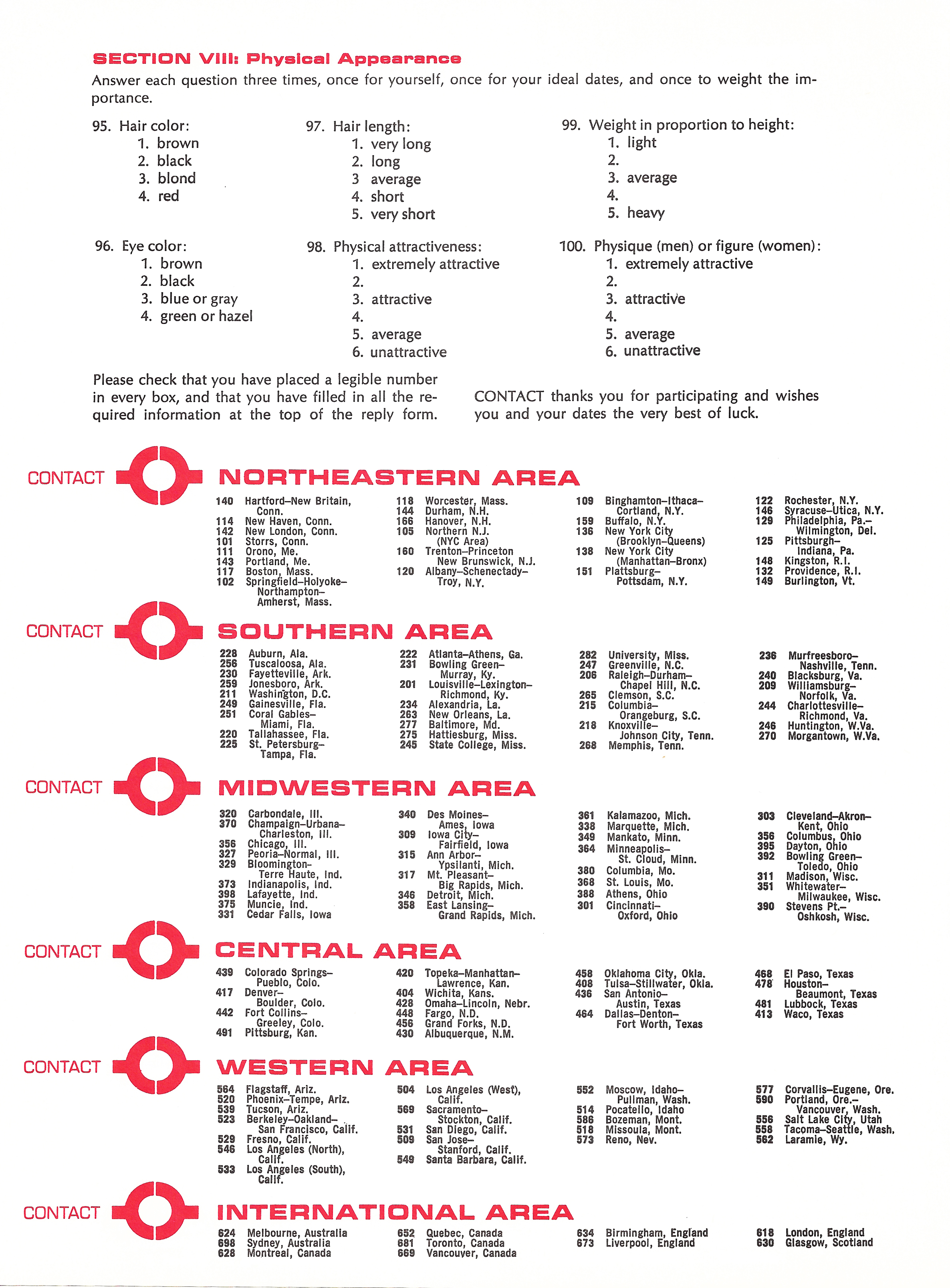

The new questionnaire retained the sections for prerequisites, attitudes, interests, and opinions along with an enhanced section for values. Contact also added two types of projective tests ("An Ancient Tale" and "Situations") to reveal values related to responsibility, loyalty, and moral obligation. In addition, the 1966 questionnaire had an expanded section on physical appearance.

=== Reply form ===
Two postage-paid reply forms were bound inside each booklet. Every reply form was pre-numbered to facilitate commission payments to campus distributors.

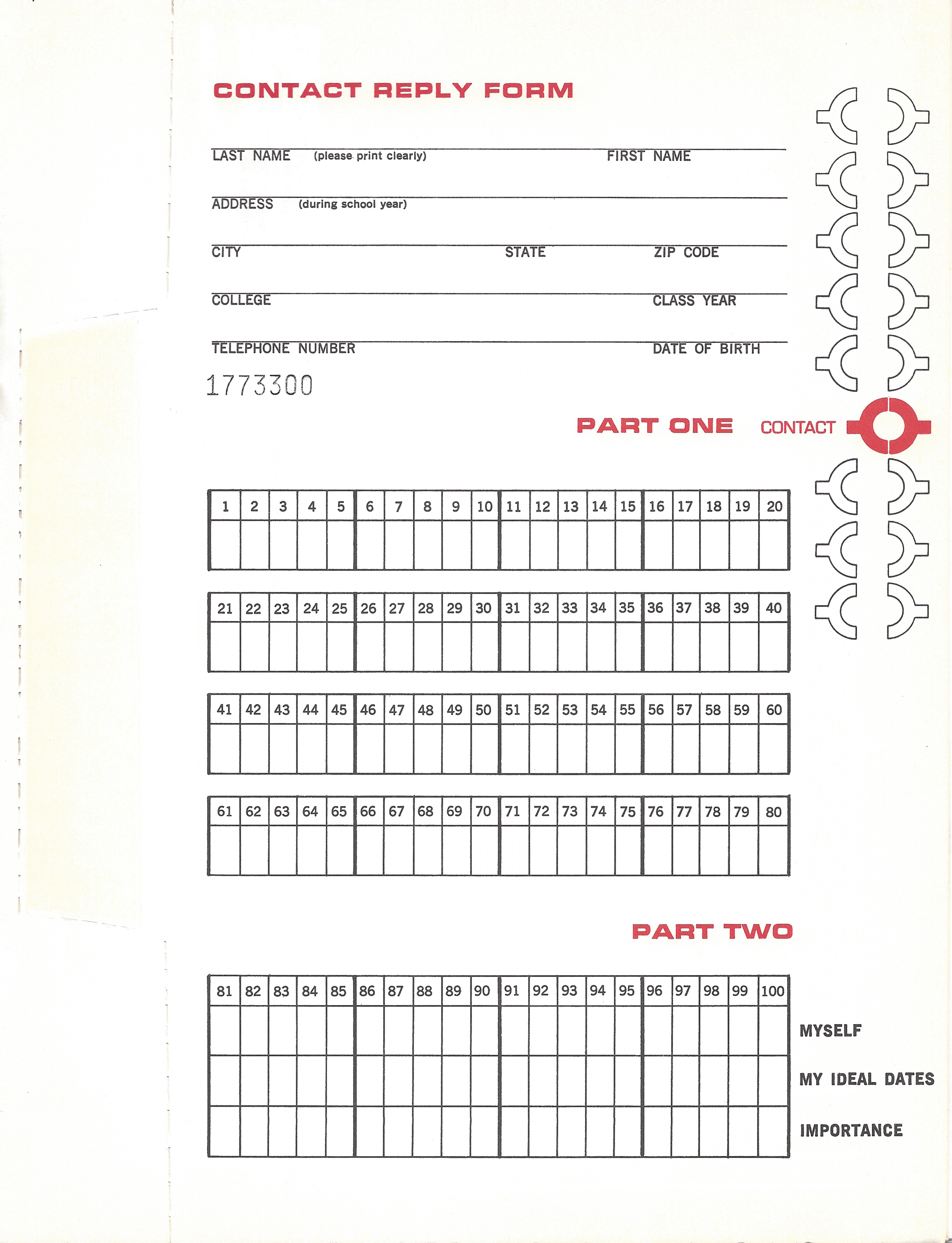
1966 reply form

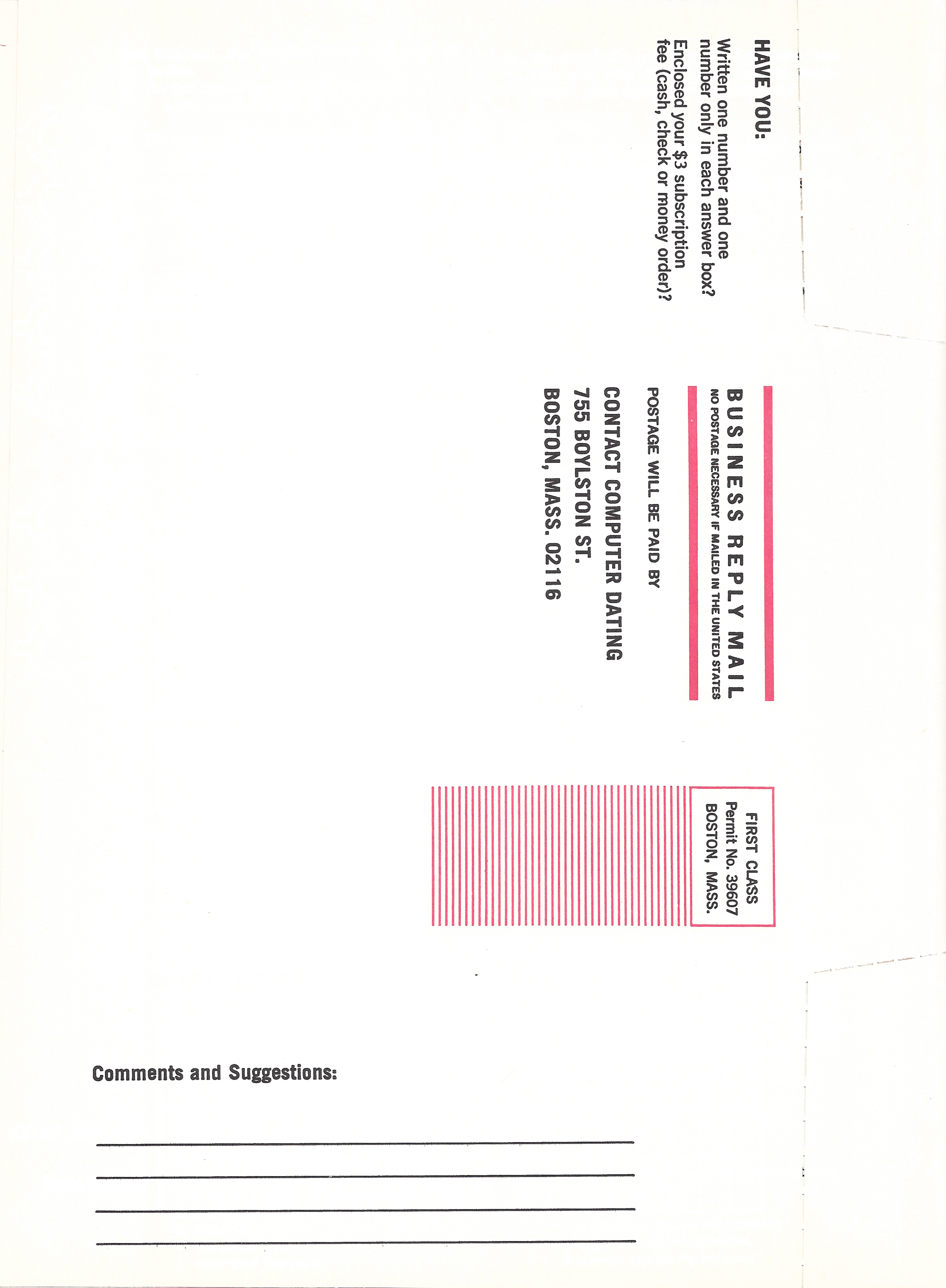
1966 reply envelope

=== Results letter ===
Results letters in 1966 included each date's birthday as an additional ice-breaker.

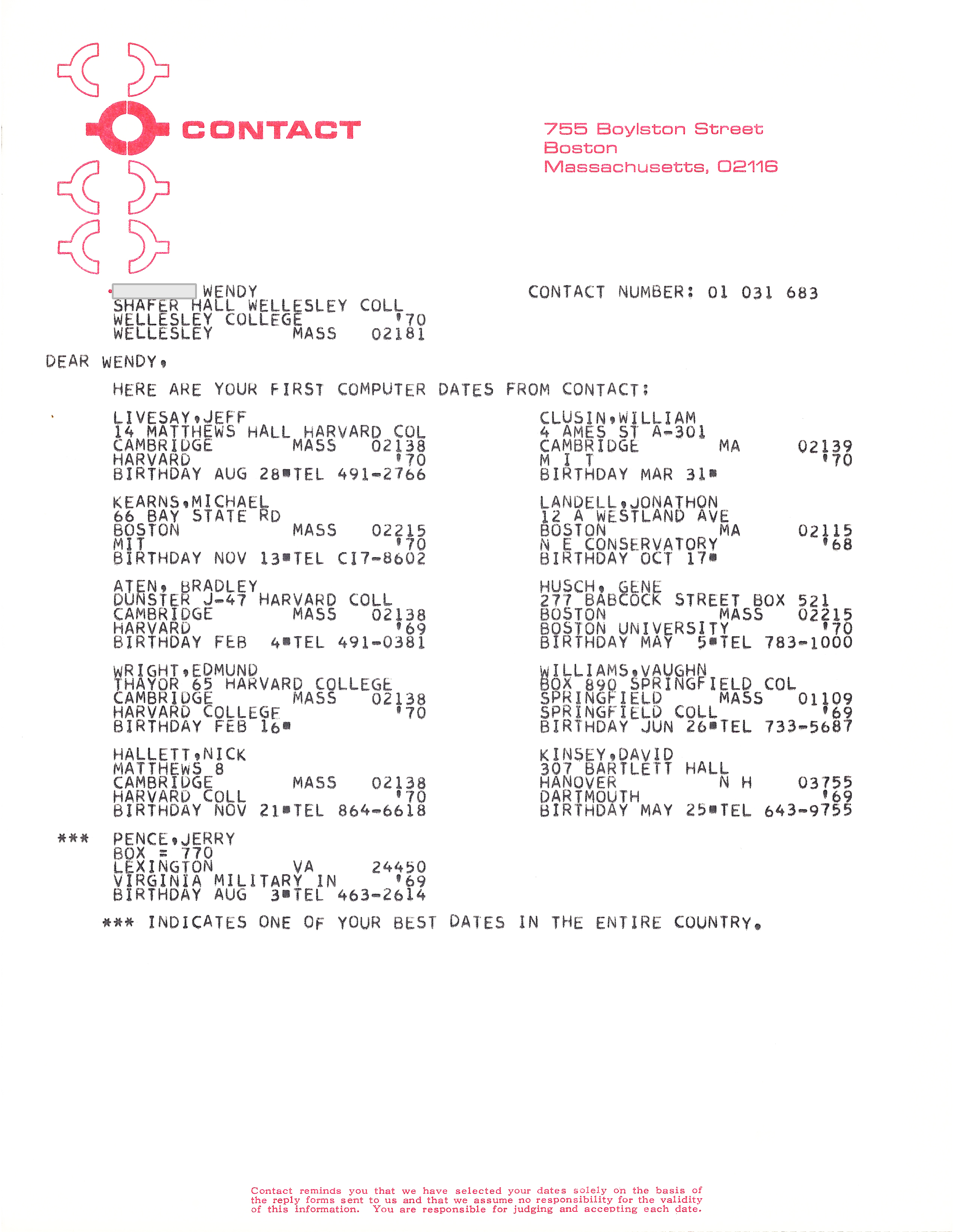
1966 letter (click for full size)

=== Marketing and distribution ===
In addition to national on-campus distribution, Contact placed newspaper ads in college markets.

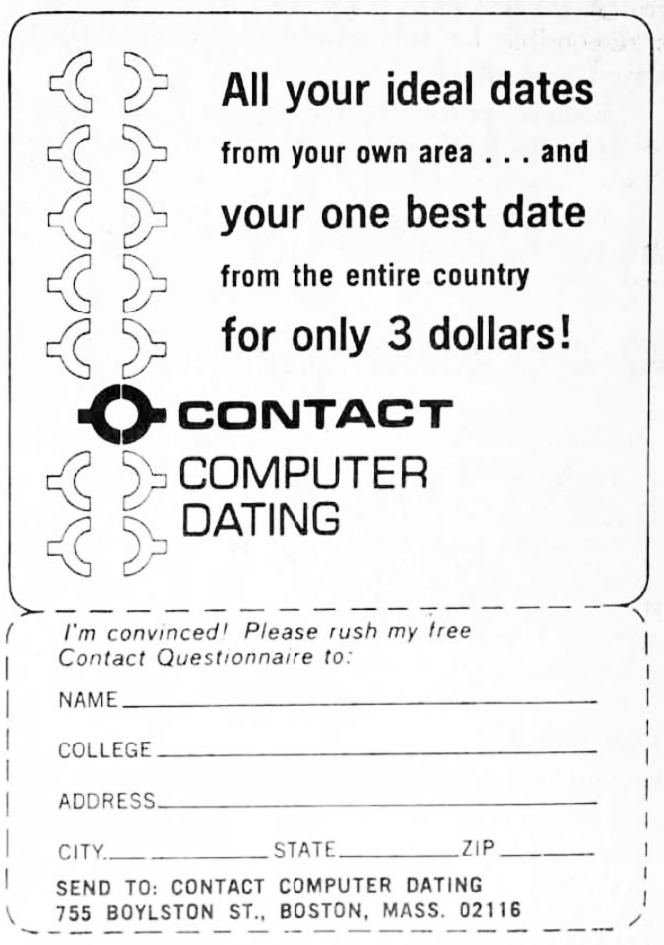
Contact newspaper ad

== Key features and innovations ==
Contact introduced several features giving participants greater and more precise control over how the computer selected their ideal dates.

=== Prerequisites ===
Contact had five prerequisite questions that each potential date had to satisfy before the computer processed additional questions. The prerequisites covered height, age, race, class year, and religion. Contact's multiple answer feature allowed participants to specify as wide or narrow a range for each category as they wanted.

=== Multiple answers ===
Many questions in the Contact questionnaire allowed participants to choose more than one answer. The instructions explained: "You may mark as many answers as you want on each of the multiple choice questions. If, for example, you enjoy popular, classical, and folk music, you may mark all three."

=== Values weighting ===
Contact enabled participants to customize how the computer weighted different factors. Marketing materials emphasized: "You can make the Contact computer evaluate your potential dates exactly the way you always evaluate them." Qualities marked "Very Important" were weighted heavily while those marked "Unimportant" were ignored.

=== Two-way matching ===
Using prerequisites and values weighting, Contact introduced what it called "two-way matching". All dates required mutual compatibility. As the company explained: "You always know that the dates you have chosen have also selected you."

=== Double reporting ===
Contact's "double reporting" system ensured that every person on a participant's list also received that participant's name. The company explained: "For girls, this means you learn immediately the names, schools, class years, etc. of all your dates, but you never have to call them because they have your name and will contact you. For boys, this means your dates will be waiting to hear from you and will know who you are when you call; you will already be introduced."

=== One best date nationwide (1966) ===
To emphasize its national expansion in 1966, Contact, in addition to finding ideal dates from nearby schools, identified each participant's most compatible date from the entire national database. The company pointed out that even if a best date attended a distant college "he or she is quite special, being your most ideal date out of several hundred thousand participants."

== Media coverage ==
Contact and computer dating generated widespread media coverage.

Gene Shalit, writing in a cover story for Look magazine, reported:

Dewan had been going steady with a girl at Wellesley, so when he organized Contact, they put themselves to the test. Sure enough, the computer matched them. But the computer also matched her with an Amherst boy, who won her away. 'It was very sad,' says Dewan, 'but it proved my system works. It found her a more compatible guy.'

This Week magazine picked up the story and quoted Dewan: "It was the shock of my life. A real computer backlash." Reader's Digest published a condensed version, headlined "Mechanized Madness".

MIT Technology Review reported on Contact's productivity: one Yale student who claimed to be "slightly above average in every respect" received the names of 245 girls as potential dates. The student was so excited that while rushing to the Smith-Mt. Holyoke area, he "rolled his car over and broke his shoulder."

Dr. Benson Snyder of MIT's psychiatric staff, after meeting with Dewan to discuss Contact, observed: "I was a little bit appalled by its 1984 overtones, but was much less concerned after we talked. Contact provides students with a chance to get over the initial hurdle of knowing that they're not going to be immediately rejected."

Dewan appeared on the national TV show What's My Line? on August 21, 1966 with panelists Steve Allen, Jayne Meadows, Arlene Francis, and Bennett Cerf.

In 2011, GQ magazine published an article titled "The Social Network: The Prequel" drawing parallels between the Contact-Operation Match rivalry and the later founding of Facebook. The article noted: "The idea is so big, so fresh, that both sides are sure there's a fortune to be made. The question is who will nail down the market first."

Dan Slater's 2013 book Love in the Time of Algorithms further documented Contact's history as a precursor to modern online dating.

== Legacy ==
Contact and Operation Match demonstrated that computers could facilitate romantic introductions, pioneering ideas that would later become central to online dating — an industry with estimated global sales of more than $8 billion in 2023.

Computer dating was a novel concept in 1965-1966, and many students were willing to experiment with the new technology. As historian Dan Slater observed: "In the '60s, when Tarr and Dewan brought the first incarnations of computer dating to college kids, stigma didn't surround the medium."

But by mid-1967, the initial wave of college computer dating had largely run its course. Operation Match wound down and sold its remaining assets while Contact shifted focus to its successful Computer Dance service for high schools.

Dewan remained optimistic about the computer's potential. In a 1969 interview he predicted:

The way I envision things, in 50 years computers may well have reduced our work week to zero hours. We'll date through computers, mate through computers, select our home with the help of computers, and plan our recreation with computers.

With the rise of the Internet in the 1990s, companies offering online dating, real estate search, and algorithm-driven travel recommendations all emerged — fulfilling several predictions from Dewan's 1969 interview.

== See also ==
- Search (college selection by computer)
- Operation Match
- Timeline of online dating
