= Search (college selection service) =

Computer software

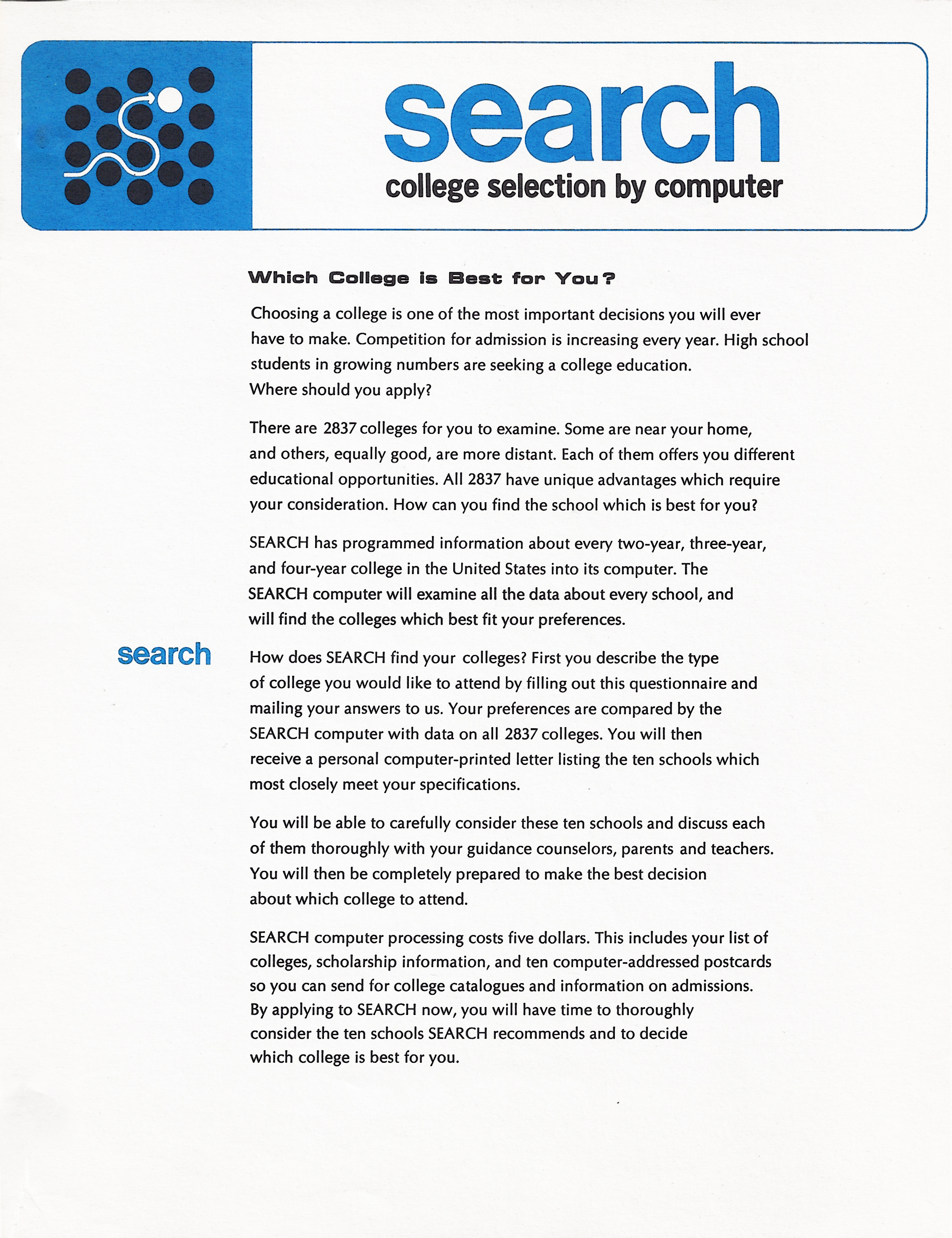
- Founded: 1966
- Founder: David DeWan
- Headquarters: Boston, Massachusetts, U.S.
- Area served: United States high schools
- Services: computerized college selection

Search was a computerized college selection service founded in 1966 by David Dewan while he was a student at Harvard Business School. The service administered a 72-question questionnaire to high school students covering their academic record and college preferences, then compared their responses against a verified database of 2,837 accredited American colleges and mailed each student a list of ten recommended institutions.

== Background ==
In 1965, David Dewan graduated from the Massachusetts Institute of Technology (MIT) and pursued entrepreneurship in computing, developing a computer dating concept before enrolling at Harvard Business School. In the spring of 1966, he borrowed US$10,000 from his grandfather to launch Search, repaying the loan within two months. He launched Search with the help of a few other students, including his brother, and hired a staff of eight after a few years.

The growing number of colleges, combined with a shortage of guidance counselors, made college selection difficult for high school students. Having already founded two companies, Contact and Computer Dance, through which Dewan had distributed questionnaires to thousands of students and processed their responses by computer, he applied the same model to the college selection market.

In 1967, there were more than 2,300 US 2-year and 4-year colleges and universities in the United States as well as over a thousand 3-year degree-granting schools (primarily hospital-affiliated nursing schools).

Type	Colleges	Notes	Source(s)
2-year	752	Not including branch campuses	
3-year	~1,300	Primarily hospital-affiliated nursing schools	
4-year	1,577	Not including branch campuses	

In the fall of 1967, there were approximately 13,647,000 students enrolled in public and private US high schools.

Grade	Students	Notes
Grade 12	2,525,000	
Grade 11	2,879,000	
Grade 10	3,221,000	
Grade 9	3,395,000	excluding junior high
unknown grade	226,000	includes grade 13
private high schools	1,400,000	grades 9 through 12
Total	13,647,000	

In the 1967–68 school year, 31,455 guidance counselors were employed in secondary schools across the United States, a figure the government considered insufficient relative to its recommended standards. National guidelines called for a ratio of one counselor for every 300 students, and authorities estimated that an additional 11,545 counselors were needed to meet that threshold.

== Database compilation and verification ==
Between 1966 and 1967, Search created a database of 2,837 accredited colleges, universities, and degree-granting institutions in the United States, encompassing every qualified two-year, three-year, and four-year school.

Beginning in the summer of 1966, a staff of eight assembled the school catalogs from an initial group of 2,200 colleges. The researchers read, compiled, and encoded the data on punch cards for entry into the computer files. "It turned out to be a larger project than we expected," Dewan admitted. With the addition of the remaining schools, the Search database grew to more than 2.5 million facts.

Dewan highlighted the importance of the data accuracy. "The basic thing is having the facts on each college correct," Dewan told The Christian Science Monitor. "Nothing can leave here until everything is perfect. There's no room for mistakes."

Search updated its database every six months with information supplied directly by the colleges, which was then verified against independent sources.

The approach drew an enthusiastic response from institutions, with Dewan reporting a near-perfect reply rate from colleges contacted for information. The database was updated twice a year through direct correspondence with the admissions office of each institution, a frequency Dewan noted kept the service more current than published college guide.

== Questionnaire ==
The cost to use Search was US$10. The Search questionnaire comprised 72 questions divided into two sections: general information about the student (questions 1 through 10), and college preferences (questions 11 through 72), with responses recorded as preferred, acceptable, or not acceptable. The questionnaire was developed with input from guidance counselors and college admissions directors.

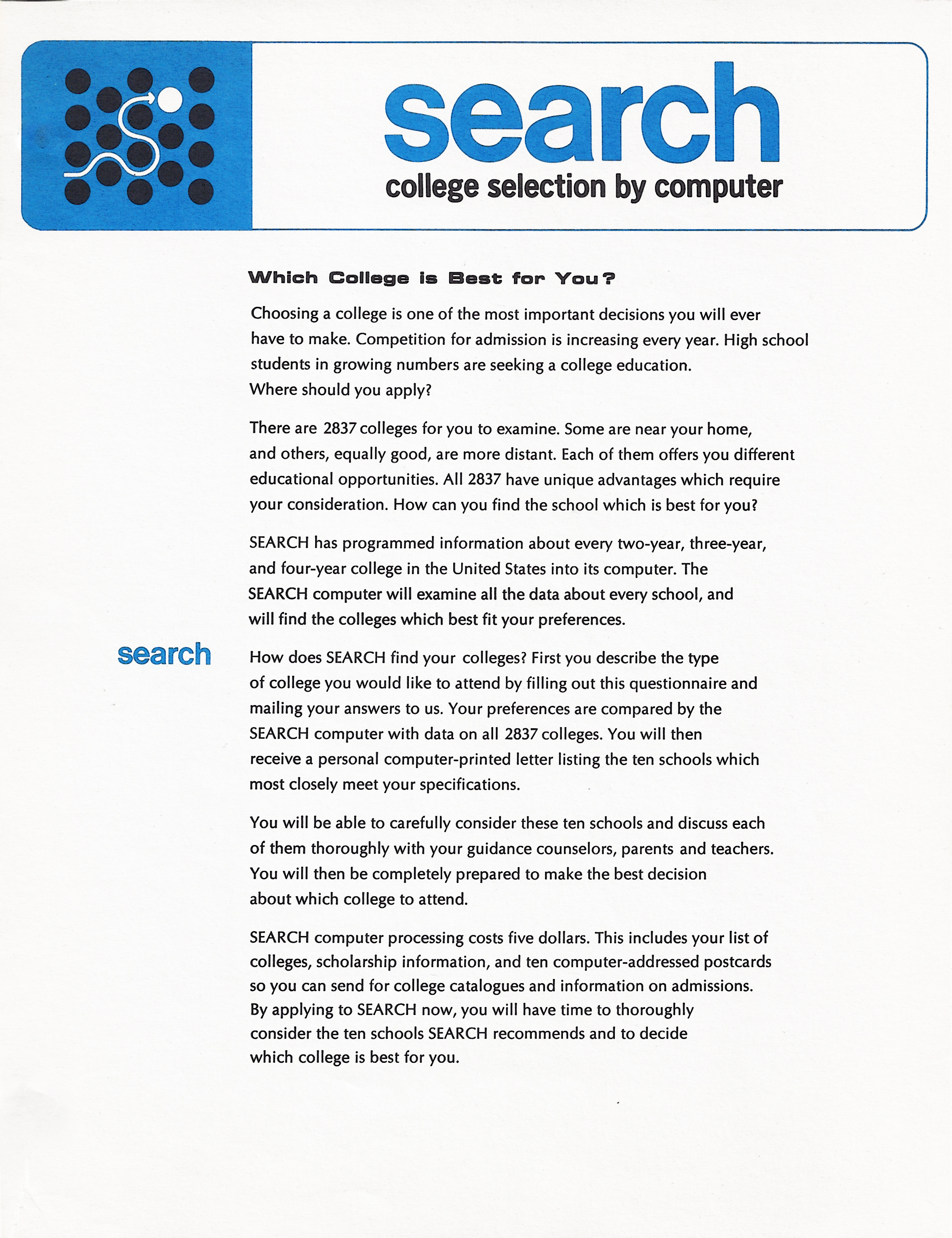

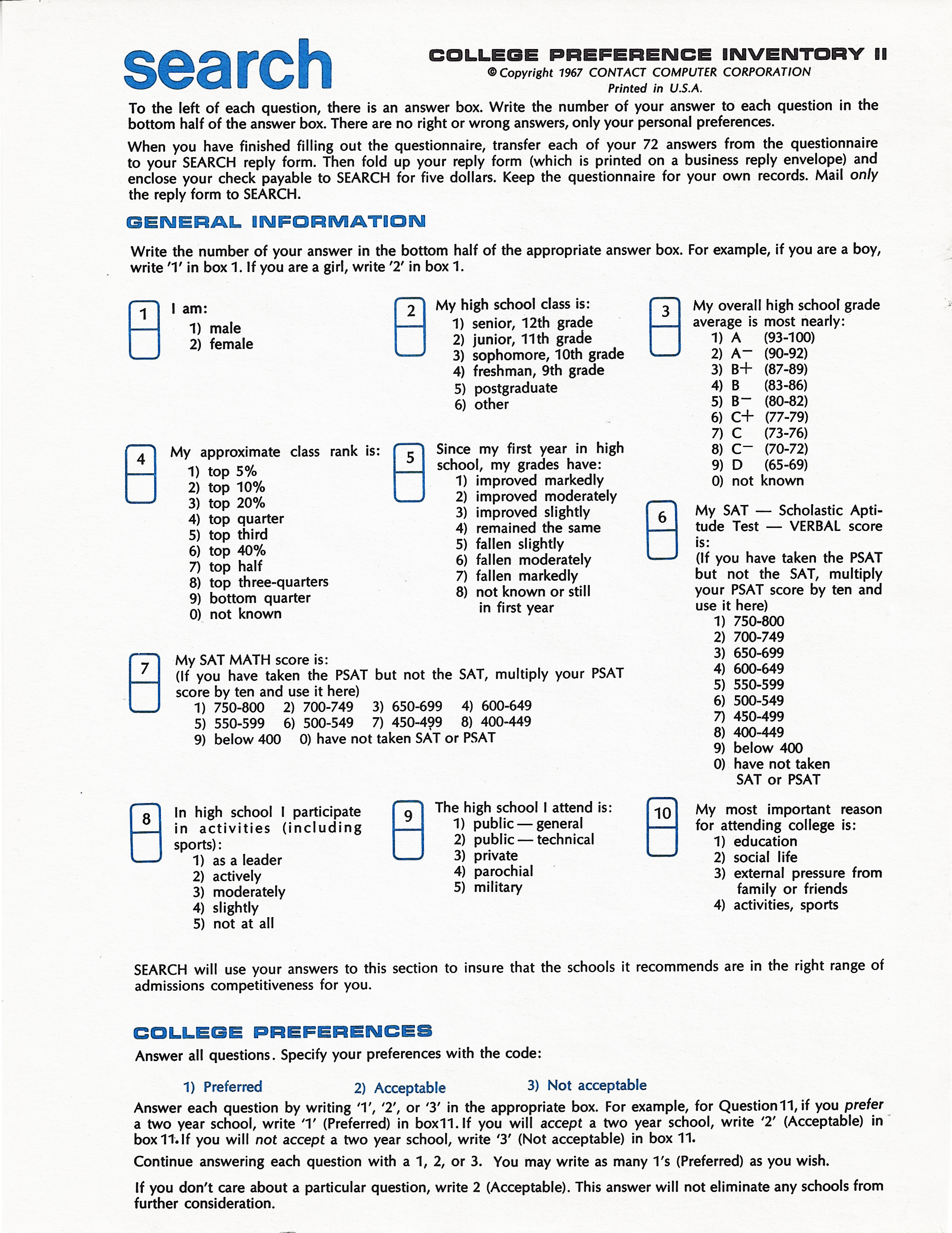

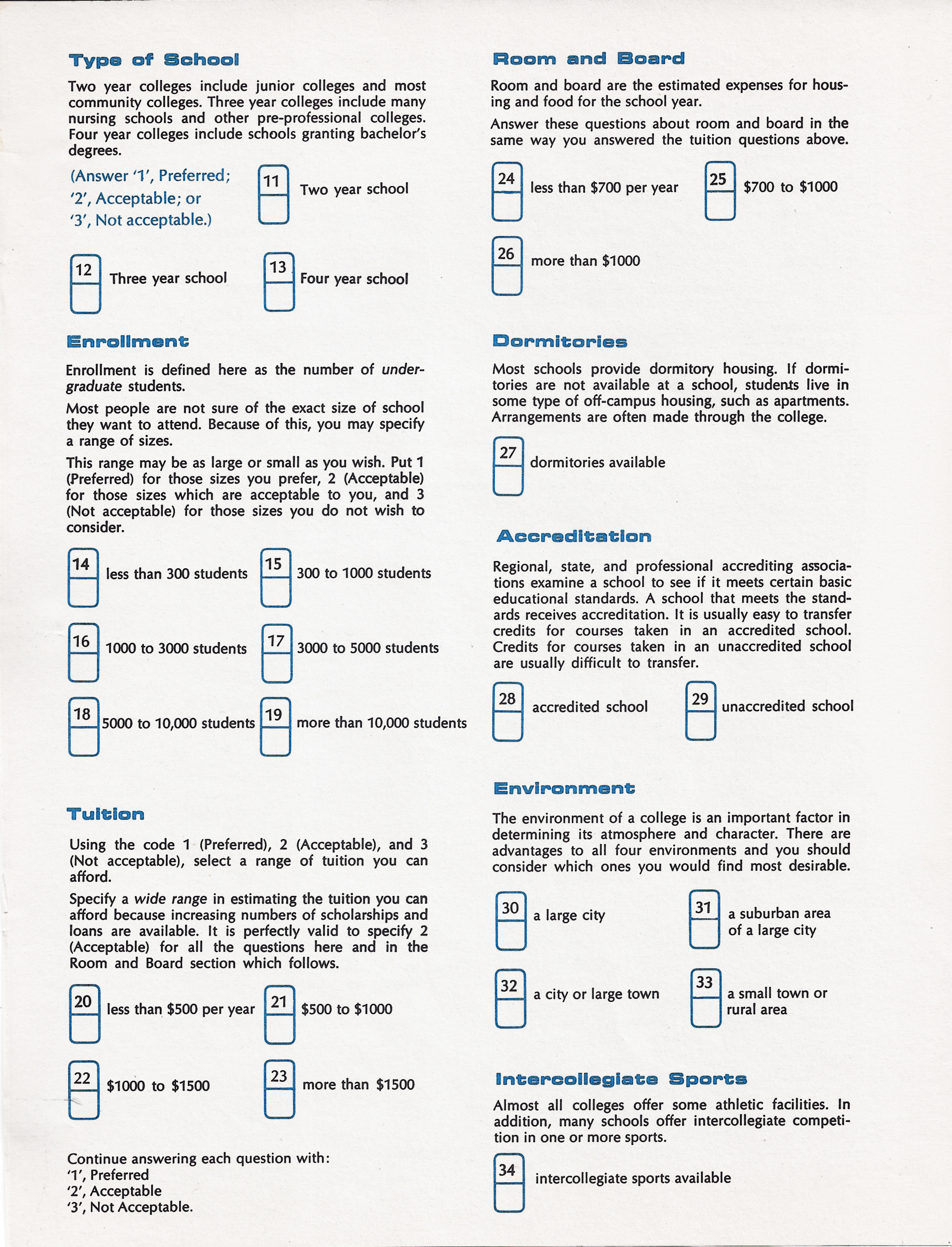

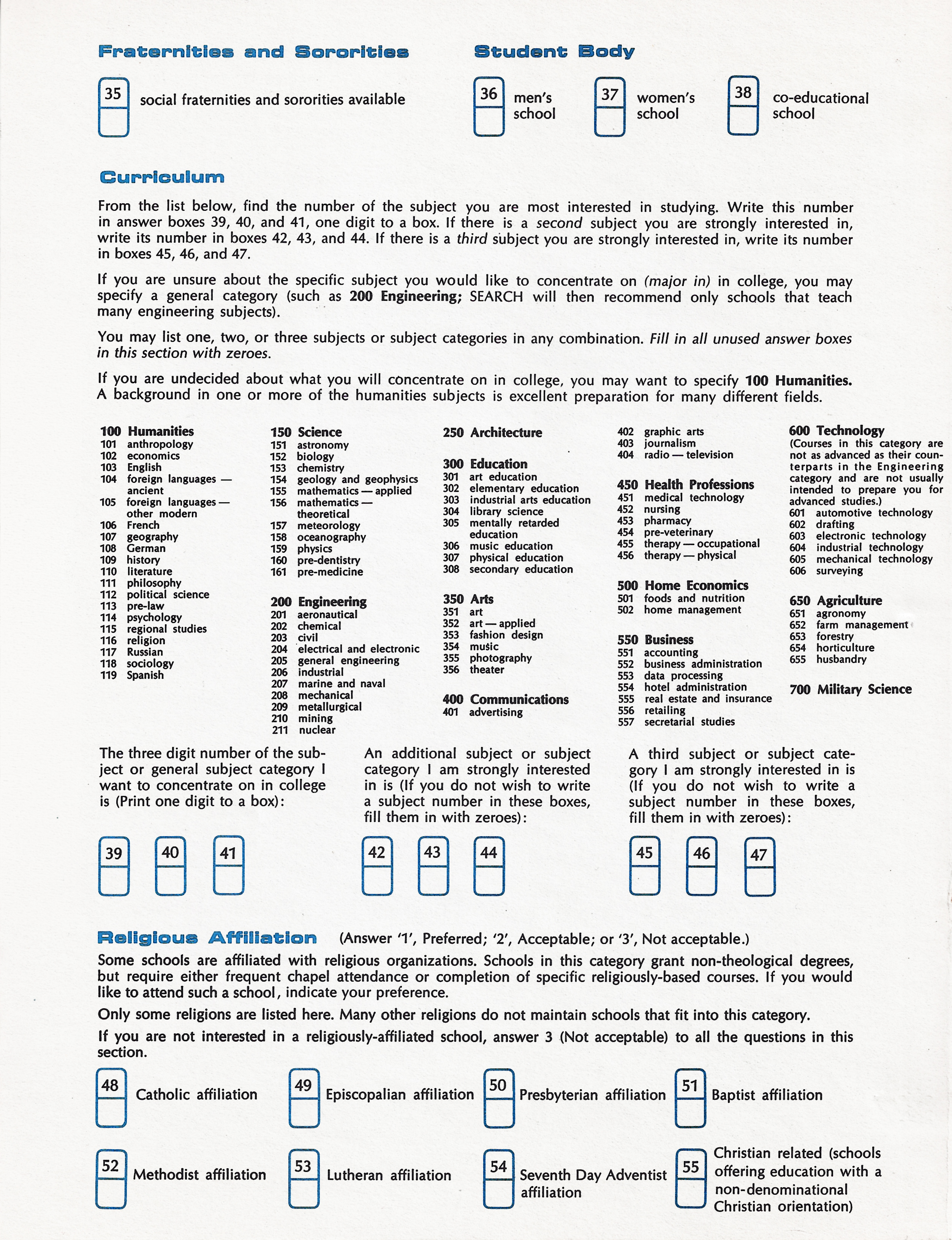

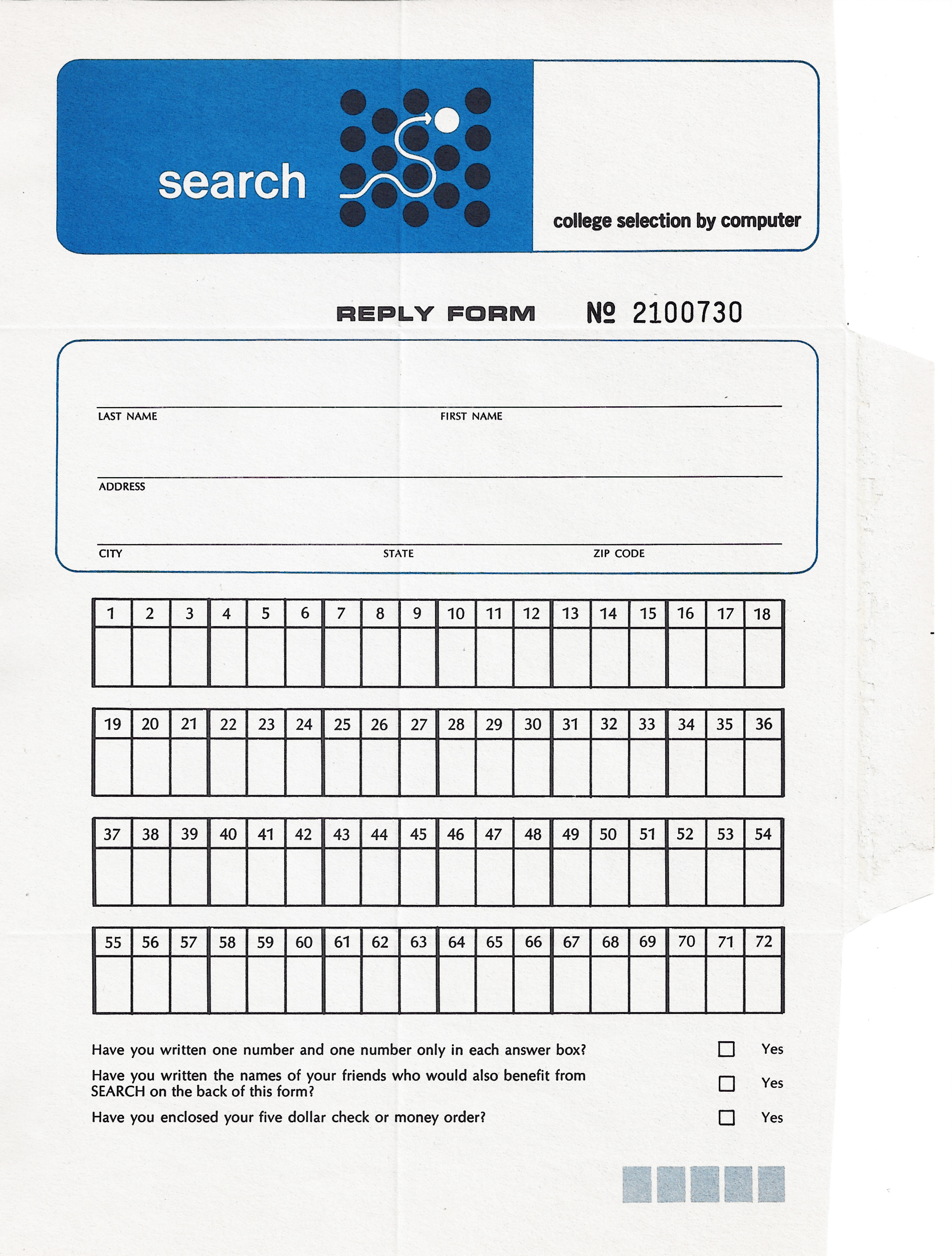

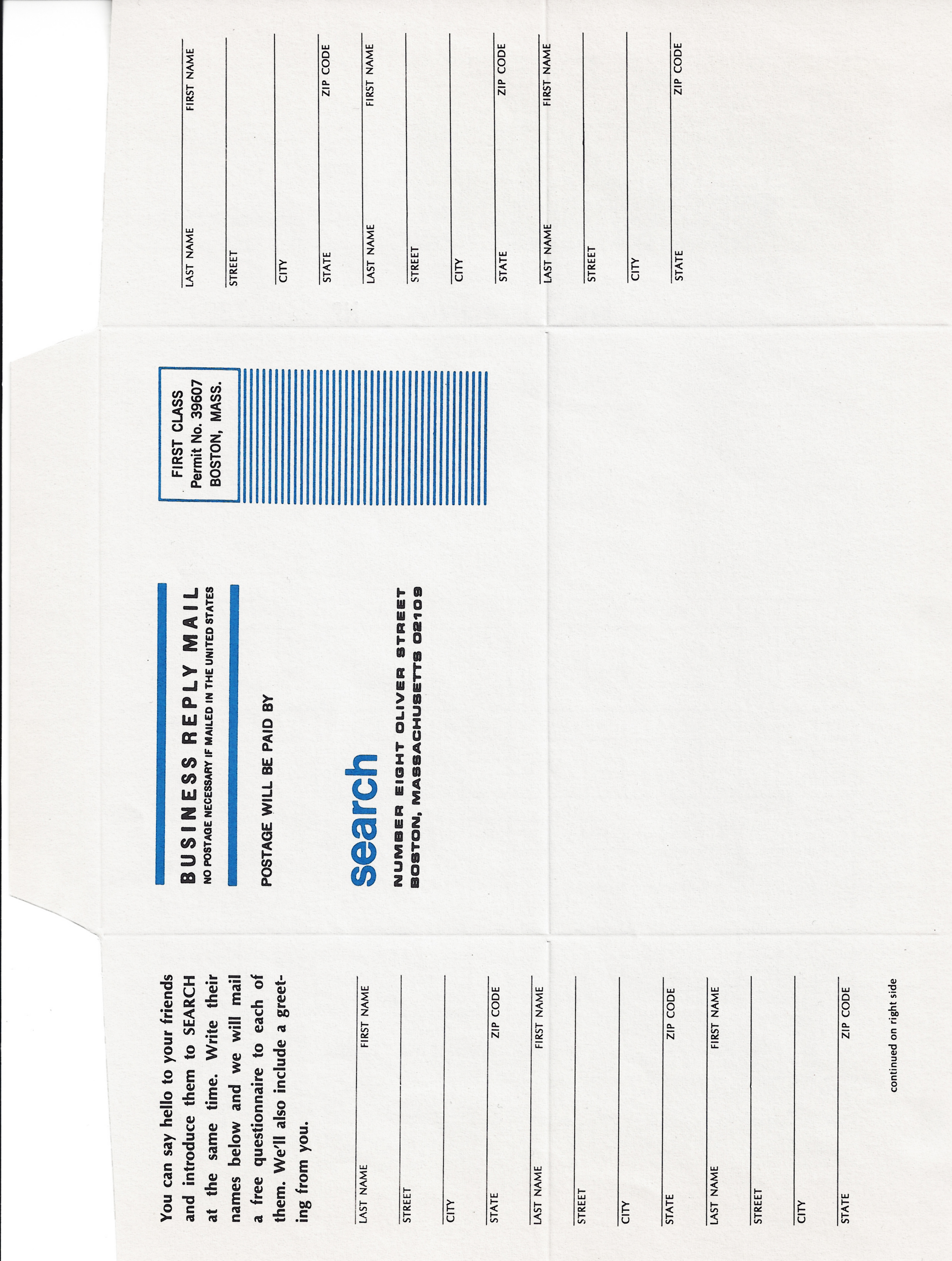

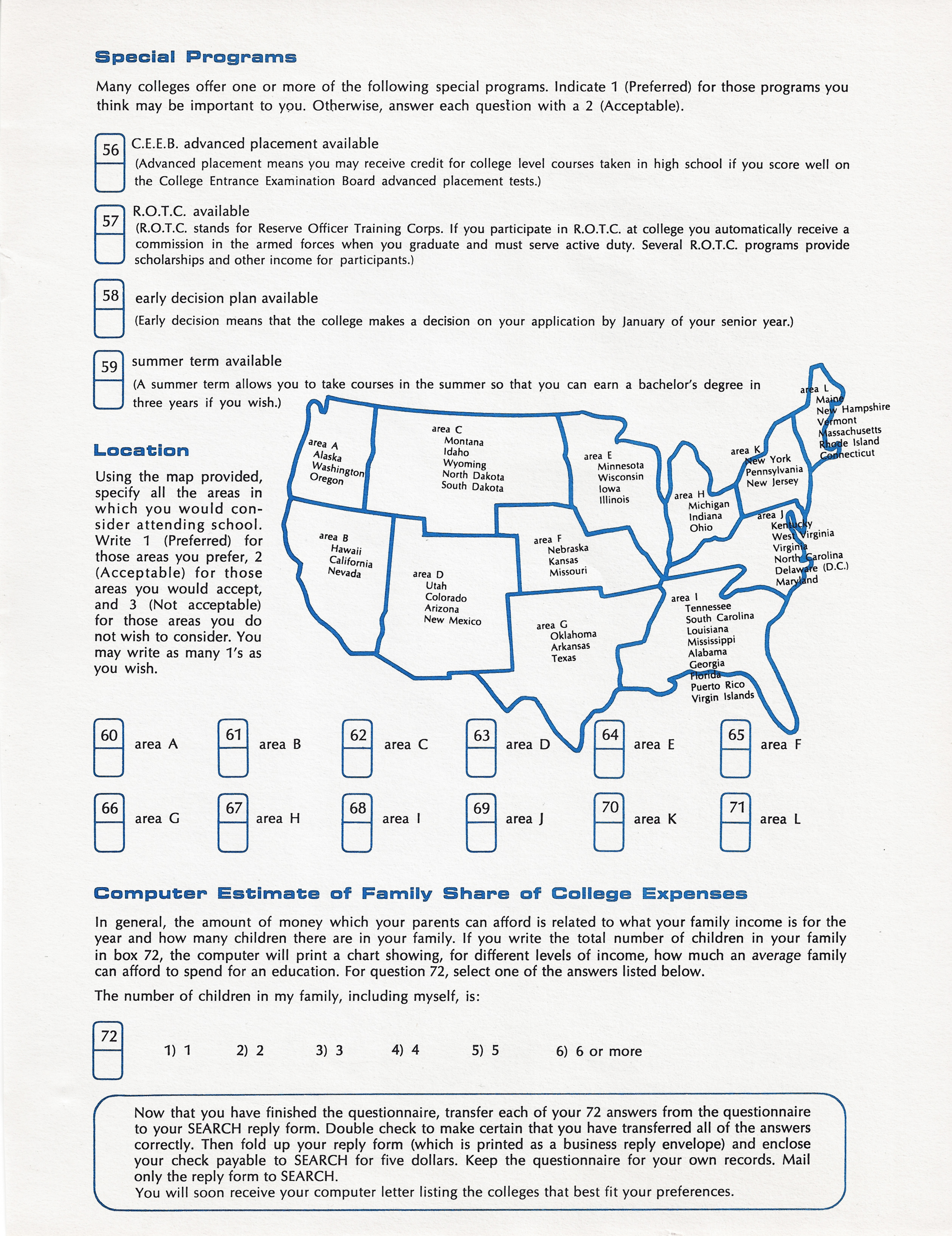

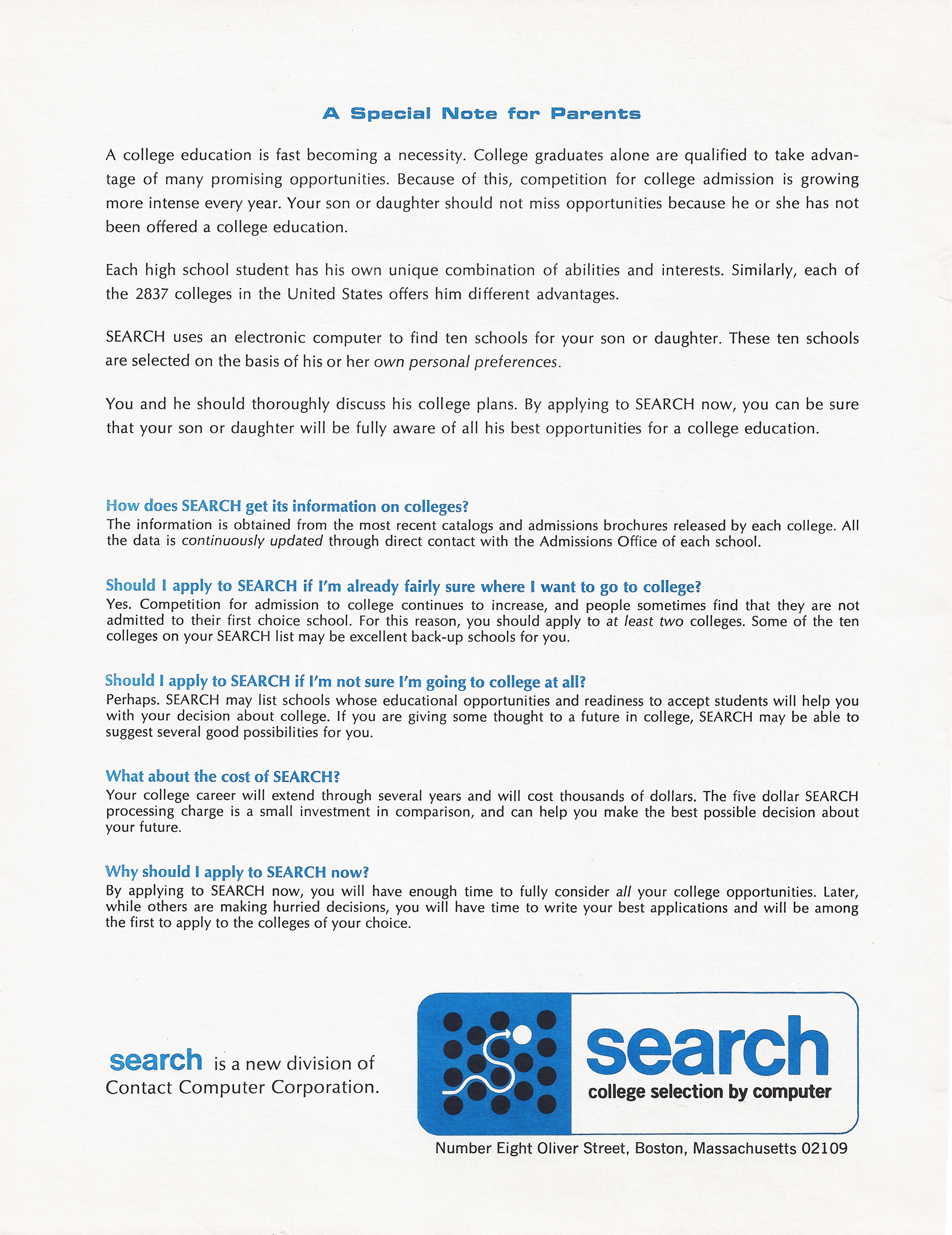

== Result letter ==
The Search computer compared each student's answers and preferences with the complete database of 2,837 colleges and selected the 10 schools that best met their needs. The computer printed a letter with each school's name, location, required tests, attendance cost, and the application deadline. Search also enclosed ten computer-printed, pre-addressed postcards so students could request catalogs and admissions information directly from each recommended school. Dewan clarified that the service was not intended to confine students to the ten recommended colleges, but rather to narrow the field to the most suitable options for each individual.

In 1969, Search was receiving about 1,000 applications for its service on a weekly basis. The company was worth US$750,000 and had two offices in Boston and Chicago that year.

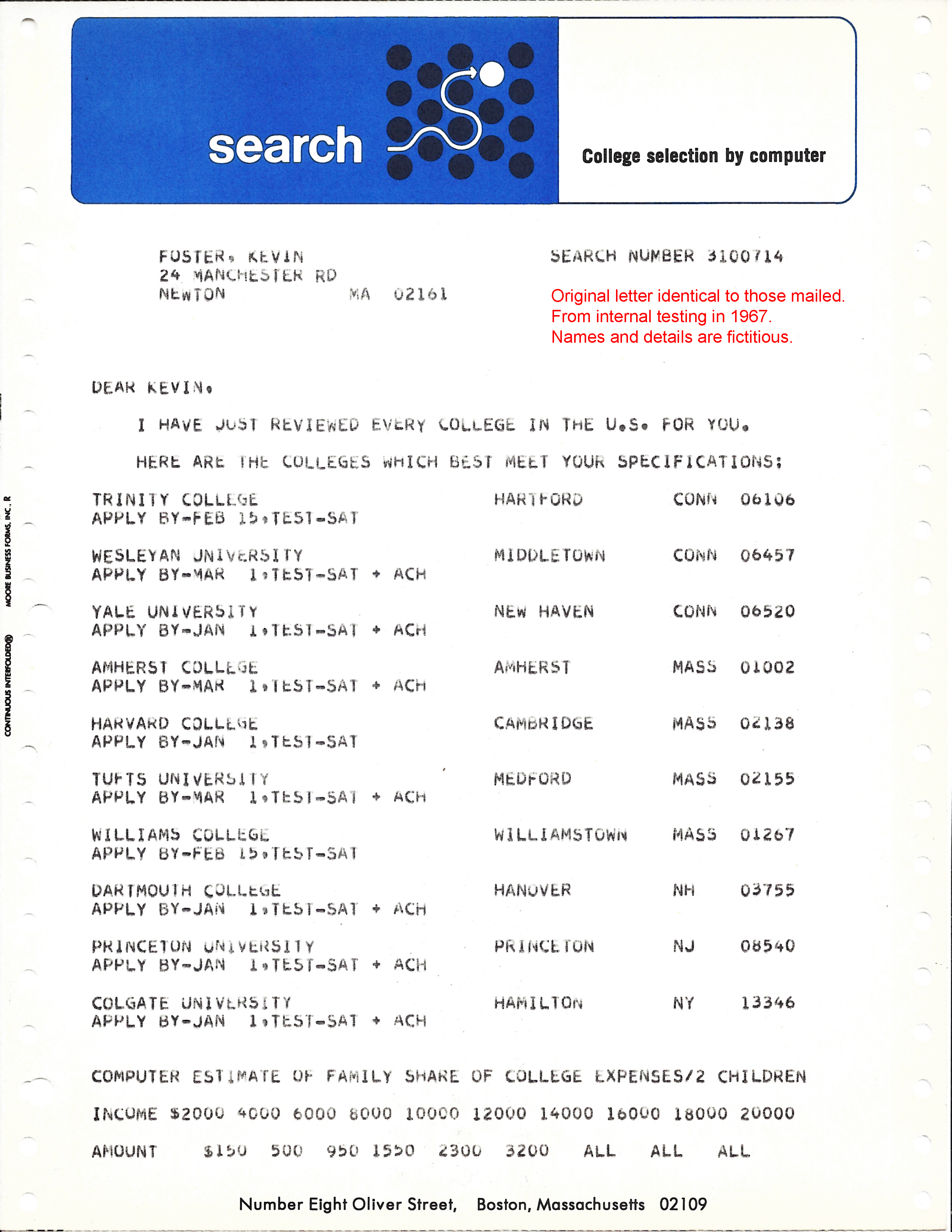
Search results letter

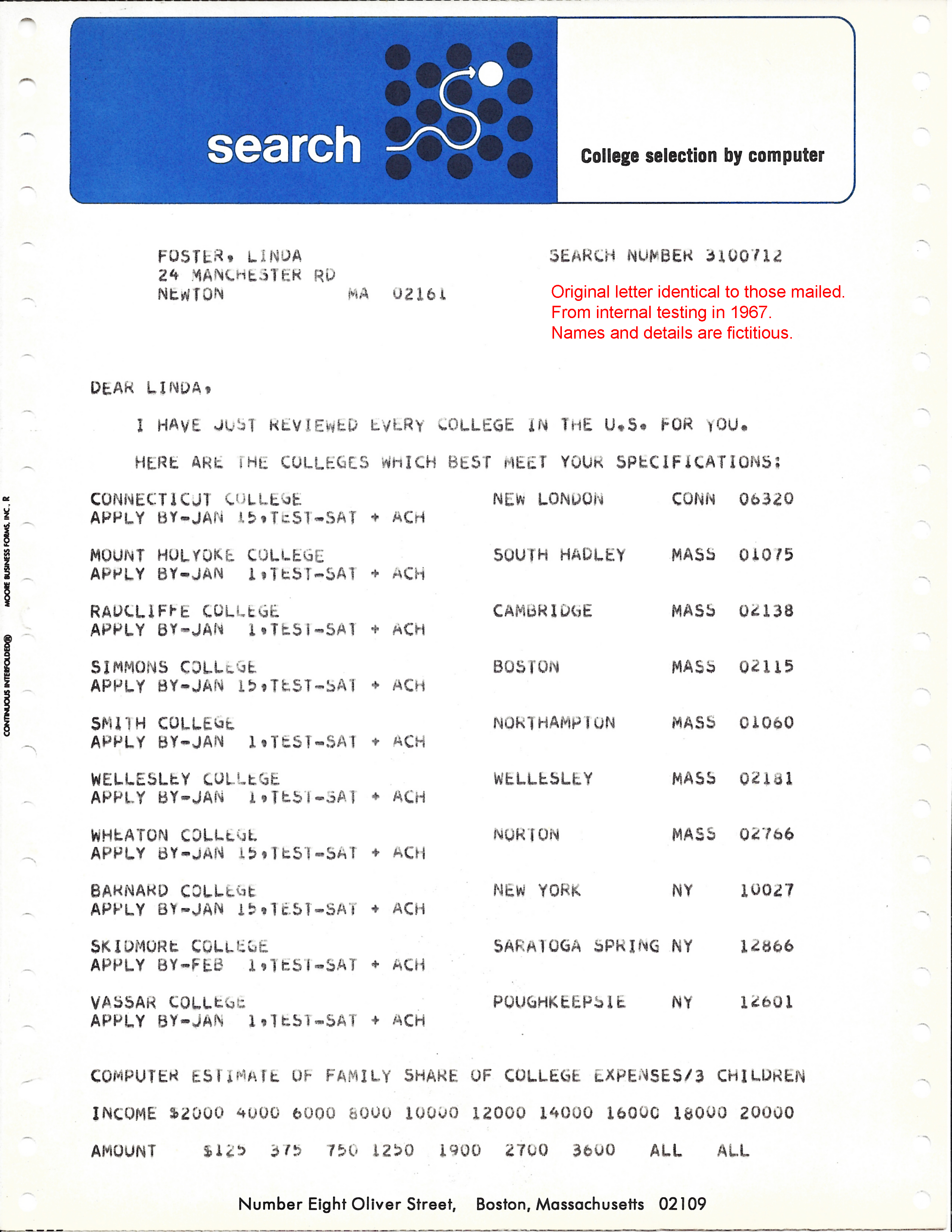
Search results letter

== See also ==
- College admissions in the United States
- Contact (computer dating)
