= Dating app =

Mobile dating application

An online dating application, commonly known as a dating app, is an online dating service presented through a mobile phone application. These apps aim to speed up the online dating process of sifting through potential dating partners, chatting, flirting, and potentially meeting or becoming romantically involved.

Online dating apps are now mainstream in the United States. As of 2017, online dating (which included both apps and other online dating services) was the principal method by which new couples in the U.S. met. The percentage of couples meeting online is predicted to increase to 70% by 2040.

== Origins ==
The first computerized dating service was launched in 1964, the St. James Computer Dating Service, which became known as Com-Pat. The first U.S. dating service that used computerized match making was Operation Match. It required men and women to complete a questionnaire and was launched in 1965. Operation Match inspired the methodology of Dateline, which became popular in the 1970s and 1980s. Match.com was launched in 1995 and turned computerized match making into a profitable business. Grindr targeted gay and bisexual men at launch. Tinder, launched in 2012, led to a growth of online dating applications by both new providers and existing online dating services that expanded into the mobile app market.

== Usage by demographic group ==
Online dating applications typically target a younger demographic group, though some apps, like Senior Match and Silver Singles are geared toward the 50 and up demographic. In 2016, almost 50% of people knew of someone who use the services or had met their loved one through the service. After the iPhone launch in 2007, online dating data has mushroomed as application usage increased. In 2005, only 10% of 18-24 year olds reported to have used online dating services; this number quickly grew to over 27%, making this target demographic the largest number of users for most applications. When Pew Research Center conducted a study in 2016, they found that 59% of U.S. adults agreed that online dating is a good way to meet people compared to 44% in 2005. This explosion in usage can be explained by the increased use of smartphones. By the end of 2022, it is expected there will be 413 million active users of online dating services worldwide.

A 2023 Pew Research Center survey of 6,034 American adults found that 30% had ever used an online dating site or app, including 53% of those aged 18 to 29, 37% of those aged 30 to 49, and 17% of those aged 50 and over. Lesbian, gay and bisexual respondents reported using dating apps at nearly twice the rate of straight respondents (51% versus 28%), and 36% of divorced, separated or widowed adults had used one, compared with 16% of married adults.

The increased use of smartphones by those 65 and older has also driven that population to the use dating apps. The Pew Research Center found that usage increase by 8 points since last surveyed in 2012. A study in 2021 found that more than one-third of seniors have dated in the past 5 years, and roughly one-third of those dating seniors have turned to dating apps.

During the COVID-19 pandemic, Morning Consult found that more Americans were using online dating apps than ever before. In one survey in April 2020, the company discovered that 53% of U.S. adults who use online dating apps have been using them more during the pandemic. As of February 2021, that share increased to 71 percent.

Research using Hofstede's cultural dimensions theory has indicated that norms about online dating applications tend to differ across cultures. A study published in the Journal of Creative Communications looked into the relationships between dating-app advertisements from over 51 countries and the cultural dimensions of these countries. The results revealed that dating-app advertisements appealed to multiple cultural needs, including the needs for relationships, friendship, entertainment, sex, status, design and identity. The use of these appeals was found to be 'congruent with ... the individualism/collectivism and uncertainty avoidance cultural dimensions.'

== Popular applications ==
Following Tinder's success, other companies released dating applications.

Raya was released in 2015 as a membership-based dating app, allowing entrance only through referrals, which was marketed as a dating app for celebrities. In early 2026, Hily surpassed Bumble to become the third most-used dating application in the United States and the fifth highest-grossing overall, driven largely by growing popularity among Generation Z users, while remaining behind Tinder and Hinge, both owned by Match Group. A number of dating apps have been created targeting adherents of particular religions seeking partners of the same religion, such as Muzmatch for Muslims, Christian Mingle, SALT, and Christian Connection for Christians, and JSwipe and JDate for Jews.

=== VR Dating ===
VR Dating is an application of Social VR where people can exist, collaborate, and perform various activities together. Virtual reality apps use virtual and augmented realities to make the dating experience more lifelike and more effective, as well as allow people to expand what is already possible in the world of online dating.

There are several online platforms of VR Dating. The VR dating app Nevermet is the VR equivalent of Tinder, where people can search and find on dates. However, instead of actual real-life pictures, users will update pictures of virtual selves and will be interacting with avatars rather than real faces. Flirtual is a self-contained social VR app that serves to match users who then decide where and how to meet in VR. Flirtual hosts speed dating and social events in VR.

== Effects on dating ==
Giulia Ranzini (VU Amsterdam) on the effects on dating by using dating apps.

The usage of online dating applications can have both advantages and disadvantages:

=== Advantages ===
Many of the applications provide personality tests for matching or use algorithms to match users. These factors enhance the possibility of users getting matched with a compatible candidate. Users are in control; they are provided with many options so there are enough matches that fit their particular type. Users can simply choose to not match the candidates that they know they are not interested in. Narrowing down options is easy. Once users think they are interested, they are able to chat and get to know the potential candidate. This form of communication can reduce the time, cost, and uncertainty often associated with traditional dating methods. Online dating offers convenience; people want dating to work around their schedules. Online dating can also increase self-confidence; even if users get rejected, they know there are hundreds of other candidates that will want to match with them so they can simply move on to the next option. In fact, 60% of U.S. adults agree that online dating is a good way to meet people and 66% say they have gone on a real date with someone they met through an application. Today, 5% of married Americans or Americans in serious relationships said they met their significant other online. The 39% of online dating users (representing 12% of all U.S. adults) say they have been in a committed relationship or married someone they met on a dating site or app.

==== Rejection sensitive individuals ====
Individuals high in rejection sensitivity are more likely to use online dating applications. As they tend to expect, perceive and overreact to rejection, rejection sensitive individuals struggle with traditional dating. Online dating applications allow for them to better reveal their true selves, potentially increasing their dating success. Online dating applications also obscure rejection cues, alleviating the rejection-related distress experienced by rejection sensitive individuals.

==== Anxiously attached individuals ====
Individuals high in attachment anxiety are also more likely to use online dating applications. While they harbour negative self-views, anxiously attached individuals are also more eager to enter and commit to relationships. Online dating applications allow for them to present "an authentic yet ideal version of themselves", mitigating their tendencies to view themselves as undesirable. This increases their romantic confidence, and potentially alleviates their anxiety when searching for a romantic partner.

=== Disadvantages ===
Sometimes having too many options can be overwhelming. With so many options available, users can get lost in their choices and end up spending too much time looking for the "perfect" candidate instead of using that time to start a real relationship. In addition, the algorithms and matching systems put in place may not always be as accurate as users think. There is no perfect system that can match two people's personalities perfectly every time.

Communication online also lacks the physical chemistry aspect that is essential for choosing a potential partner. Much is lost in translation through texting. Online dating has made dating very superficial; the picture on a user's profile may cause someone to match or not match before even getting to know their personalities.

An issue amplified by dating apps is a phenomenon known as 'ghosting', whereby one party in a relationship cuts off all communication with the other party without warning or explanation. Ghosting poses a serious problem for dating apps as it can lead to users deleting the apps. For this reason, companies including Bumble and Badoo introduced features intended to let users end chat conversations more politely.

Online dating was once stigmatized, but has become accepted over time to the point where it is now normalized in the United States.

== Perverse incentives and enshittification ==
The market for dating apps has been cited as an example of enshittification. The conflict between the app's ostensible goal of matchmaking, and its operators' desire to convert users to the paid version of the app and retaining them as paying users indefinitely by keeping them single, providing perverse incentives that cause their effectiveness to decline over time as efforts at monetization begin to dominate. An analysis by OK Cupid, since taken down, attempted to quantify the statistical basis for these incentives. Mathematical modelling has also suggested that it is in the financial interests of app operators to offer their user base a sub-optimal experience.

== Data privacy ==
Dating apps and online dating sites are often involved in cases concerning the misuse of data. In 2018 Grindr, the first platform for gay dating is accused to have shared data about the HIV status of its users with numerous companies. Grindr recognized the allegations but claimed that it was in order to optimize its platform which doesn't convince the LGBT community. Grindr defended itself by sharing the data loss prevention of the company and reassuring the users with the public intervention of its CTO Scott Chen. In Europe, dating platforms care more and more about data legislation because of the GDPR sanctions that threatens companies with economic sanctions.

Other personal data are sold by dating apps. The one that is the most bought by private companies remains the geographical information of users. When the user allows localization, apps record them and store them using Geographic Coordinate System. When a data breach happens, geographical information directly exposes users.

As others applications, dating apps can have breaches: hackers have revealed security issues on Tinder, Coffee Meets Bagel or Adult FriendFinder for instance. On the last one, the data of more than 412 million users was exposed, one of the largest leak in terms of the number of accounts exposed. In 2016, the sharing of personal information from almost 40 million users of Ashley Madison by a group of Hackers, the "Impact Team", revealed their real name, phone number, email address, geographical position and sexual preferences. Ashley Madison assured their more than 35 million users that the service was totally "anonymous" and "100% discrete" but they didn't completely delete accounts when users chose to (and paid for that) or recognize that data had actually leaked in a first time. Some suicides have been reported after the leak. In 2025, the group known as ShinyHunters claimed to have obtained around 10 million records from Match Group properties including Tinder, Hinge and OkCupid. The company opened an investigation into the claim.

=== Data theft and cybersecurity ===
After analyzing a significant number of diverse mobile dating applications, researchers have concluded that most of the major dating applications are vulnerable to simple sniffing attacks, which could reveal very sensitive personal information such as sexual orientation, preferences, e-mails, degree of interaction between users, etc. In 2024, security researchers reported that application-programming-interface flaws in Tinder, Bumble, Grindr and Hinge could be used to obtain users' precise locations.

Online dating platforms are also used as honeypots wherein attackers create fake profiles to steal users' private information.

Online dating platforms have become fertile ground for scammers, leading to significant financial and emotional harm to users. In 2022, the U.S. Federal Trade Commission (FTC) reported that nearly 70,000 individuals fell victim to romance scams, with losses totalling $1.3 billion. The median loss per victim was approximately $4,400.

The United Kingdom has also experienced a surge in such fraudulent activities. Barclays Bank noted a 60% increase in reported losses due to romance scams over a six-month period in 2023, with victims losing an average of £10,000.

In April 2026, World ID for Tinder launched as a joint effort between Match Group and World, positioned by both companies as a response to fake profiles and scams on dating platforms.

== See also ==
- Comparison of online dating services
- Online dating service
- List of LGBTQ social networking services
