= Guy Wilkinson =

Guy Wilkinson may refer to:

- Guy Wilkinson (priest)
- Guy Wilkinson (physicist)
