= Dating =

Meeting socially intending a future relationship

Dating is an activity involving spending time with other individuals ("going on dates") usually through planned social encounters, with the intention of getting to know each other, often with a romantic or intimate purpose. While the result of dating may at any time lead to friendship, any level of intimate relationship, marriage, or no relation, its significance extends beyond relationship status. Studies in human psychology find that dating can also function as a form of personal growth, as individuals expand their understanding of themselves and others through shared experiences and emotional exchange.

== Etymology ==
The earliest recorded use of the noun "date" in English appeared in 1896 in the writings of George Ade, a columnist for the Chicago Record. In this context date referred to a form of public courtship, when a woman met a man outside the private sphere of the home or court. In Ade's 1899 collection "Fabels in Slang", he used the term "Date Book" to describe a ledger kept by a shop cashier to track her dates with suitors until marriage.

During the Victorian era (mid-1800s until World War I), courtship customs differed sharply by social class: among the middle and upper classes, romantic interactions occurred under parental supervision within the home, while working-class couples, whose smaller living spaces limited privacy, met in public venues such as restaurants, dances, and theatres. These public outings marked a cultural shift from supervised dating to unsupervised leisure encounters, giving rise to the modern notion of a “date”, understood as a planned social meeting between potential romantic partners.

The term and practice of dating spread globally through cultural exchange, colonisation, and mass media, but it has no direct linguistic equivalent in most Eastern languages. In China, the modern term yuēhuì (约会, “appointment” or “meeting”) adopted romantic meaning in the early 20th century under Western influence. In Japan, the word deeto (デート) was borrowed phonetically from English during the Taishō period (1912–1926), reflecting the shift in marriage practices from the traditional omiai (formal, facilitated introductions) to the modern, Western-influenced dating based on individual choice and romantic love. In many Arabic-speaking societies, romantic interaction before marriage traditionally occurred within tightly regulated frameworks such as khitbah (engagement) or family-arranged meetings, and public expressions of affection were often restricted by social and religious norms. The diffusion of global media and migration introduced new discourses of love and companionship, particularly among urban youth and diaspora populations. As a result, the borrowed term daiting (دايتنغ) along with variants such as diting and dāyteng, entered colloquial usage, typically referring to informal cross-gender interactions that mirrored aspects of Western-style dating, while remaining distinct from traditional family-mediated courtship practices.

== Forms and practices of dating ==
The term dating can refer to several related concepts. Dating can take many forms, differing in intentionality (the kind of relationship people seek, e.g. committed, casual, exploratory), medium (e.g. in-person, digital), and structure (e.g. dyadic, multi-partner), reflecting how individuals navigate connection, commitment and context in modern relationships.

Commonly recognized forms include:

- Traditional dating
- Online dating
- Long-distance dating
- Casual dating
- Intentional dating
- Double dating
- Group dating
- Blind dating
- Speed dating
- Multi-partner dating
- Historical forms of dating

=== Traditional dating ===
Traditional dating is a culturally defined, offline form of courtship characterized by established rituals, social scripts, and often family or community involvement. Traditional dating typically involves meeting prospective partners through in-person interactions and personal introductions (via friends, family, or community). In this mode, dating typically follows culturally embedded customs and social scripts. For example in many cultures, men are expected to initiate dates and cover expenses, while women are often expected to respond receptively, reflecting persistent gender norms associated with courtship roles. Family oversight and community participation are also common, as courtship has traditionally unfolded under parental supervision or through arranged introductions. For instance, in Japan's omiai custom, a matchmaker (nakōdo) arranges a formal meeting between a man and a woman, who are often accompanied by their parents. However, the rate of people meeting partners through traditional means, while still present, has steadily declined since around 2013, giving way to the growing dominance of online dating.

=== Online dating ===
Online dating refers to the use of internet-based platforms, applications, or social media to initiate and develop romantic or sexual relationships between individuals who have not previously met in person. It enables individuals to connect outside of their immediate social networks through digital profiles, algorithms, or shared interests, making it one of the most significant transformations in modern courtship.

Contemporary online dating began in the mid-1990s with online dating websites, followed by mobile apps in the 2010s. These modernised the personals section of newspapers as a way to find prospective partners and about 30% of Americans report using a dating site. These technologies introduced geolocation-based matching, algorithmic recommendations, and swipe interfaces that normalised digital romantic interaction across many cultures, dramatically expanding the user base. Over time, the stigma once associated with finding partners online faded as digital matchmaking became mainstream and seamlessly integrated into everyday dating culture.

In addition to dating apps, many people now form romantic connections through social media platforms such as Instagram, X, and Facebook. These interactions often emerge through "mutuals" (friends or acquaintances followed by both parties) where liking, commenting, or replying to stories functions as a low-risk form of flirtation and vetting. This pattern reflects what have been described as ambient intimacy: a mode of online intimacy that develops gradually through sustained visibility, shared digital environments and micro connections rather than explicit matching algorithms.

Some studies suggest that online dating facilitates the process for those with social anxiety. Studies also suggest that online environment is conducive to impression management, such as selectively presenting personal details or photos, however many still pursue genuine emotional connection and trust through these online interactions.

During the COVID-19 pandemic, dating apps adapted by integrating in-app video and voice features to support real-time interactions and maintain intimacy at a distance. This development, often referred to as virtual dating, shifted early romantic encounters from public spaces to private homes and blended online interaction with synchronous communication via Zoom, WhatsApp, FaceTime, Google Hangouts. Researchers suggest that these practices are likely to persist beyond the pandemic, reflecting broader trends in how technology mediates intimacy.

=== Long-distance dating ===
Long-distance dating refers to romantic relationships in which partners live in different geographic locations and maintain connection through digital communication (e.g. phone calls, video chats, messaging) and typically scheduled in-person meetings that involve travel. Such relationships may emerge from prior in-person connections or online interactions.

Studies indicate that long-distance partners often report levels of relationship satisfaction and stability comparable to, or even higher than, geographically close couples, partly because communication tends to be more deliberate and self-disclosing. Qualitative research shows that intimacy in long-distance dating often depends on shared meanings of "feeling close", a strong base of friendship, and trust supported by consistent communication and technology use, including synchronous digital tools designed to facilitate real-time shared experiences between geographically separated partners, and many partners view the distance as a temporary and purposeful phase that reinforces commitment.

Challenges of long-distance dating include limited physical contact, travel costs, and the emotional strain of uncertainty about future reunification and commitment.

Research on the transition from long-distance to geographically close relationships shows that such reunions can be both rewarding and challenging. About half of long-distance couples eventually reunite, but roughly one-third of those relationships end within three months of reunion. The shift often brings changes such as reduced autonomy, time management difficulties, and increased conflict or jealousy, as partners adjust to daily proximity and lose some of the novelty and independence characteristic of long-distance dating. Research comparing long-distance and geographically close dating relationships found that long-distance partners often engage in greater idealization and report higher satisfaction with relationship communication, apparently to greater effort put into communication.

=== Casual dating ===
Casual dating refers to romantic or sexual relationships that are not oriented toward long-term commitment or exclusivity. Such arrangements may involve short-term or non-exclusive partnerships. Motivations for casual dating can include sexual exploration, socialisation, or autonomy, and personal growth rather than commitment or marriage.

Sexual interactions between unmarried heterosexuals have been variously defined as promiscuity, free love, casual sex, or hook-up culture, friends with benefits, depending on the ideological and disciplinary context. Casual dating exists on a continuum that ranges from transient encounters to ongoing but non-exclusive relationships, reflecting diverse approaches to intimacy and attachment. The meaning and moral interpretation of casual dating differ by culture, gender, and generation.

A research study (2025) found no evidence for a stereotype that people who engage in casual sex, particularly women, have lower self-esteem than those who report only committed sexual relationships.

=== Intentional dating ===
Intentional dating is a practice in which partners in established relationships schedule regular dates involving planned activities. It is based on the idea that desire and emotional closeness can be strengthened through ongoing effort rather than left to routine or chance. The approach emphasises mindful choice of activities that promote curiosity about oneself and one's partner, novelty, and emotional presence, which can strengthen emotional connection and sexual desire. Intentional dating draws on self-expansion theory, which suggests that relationships benefit when partners engage in new shared experiences and self-determination theory, applying its principles of autonomy, competence and relatedness to the cultivation of sexual desire.

=== Double dating ===
A double date is a social activity in which two couples go out together on the same occasion, sharing the experience as a group rather than individually. Each person is romantically involved only with their own partner and there’s no romantic or sexual interaction between the couples. A study in 2010 by psychologist Richard B. Slatcher found that couples who engaged in high-disclosure conversation with another couple reported feeling closer to their own partners afterward. A follow-up study by Welker, Slatcher, Baker, and Aron (2014) found that the responsiveness of the other couple to personal disclosures predicted increases in passionate love within each couple.

=== Group dating ===
Group dating is a social event in which groups of single men and women meet together with the aim of forming new acquaintances or romantic relationships. In Japan, this practice is known as gōkon and typically involves equal numbers of men and women meeting at a restaurant or bar, arranged by two organisers who each invite friends from their respective social circles.

=== Blind dating ===
Blind dating refers to a meeting between two people who have not previously met, arranged by a mutual acquaintance, family member, or matchmaking service. The participants typically know little or nothing about each other before the encounter, beyond basic identifying information. The practice became popular in Western societies during the mid-20th century as part of social matchmaking culture and was later adapted for television programs and digital platforms.

A study analysing newspaper-arranged blind dates found that women tend to be more selective than men, giving slightly lower ratings to their dates, consistent with parental investment theory and sexual strategies theory, which suggest that women are generally more cautious in mate selection due to higher reproductive investment.

Blind dating is valued by some for reducing appearance-based bias, while others view it as risky or unpredictable due to limited prior knowledge. Recent research shows that attraction during dating interactions isn’t driven by physical appearance alone - it also emerges from a subtle choreography of movements, reactions, and expressions that create emotional connection and mutual responsiveness. This helps explain why blind dating, despite its unpredictability, can still foster genuine connection through the shared experience of curiosity and emotional resonance. Today, it remains common in the context of online dating, often facilitated by apps or social media. Many dating platforms now include “blind date” modes that hide photos until after both people agree to chat, recreating the suspense of traditional blind dating. In South Korea blind dating is known as sogaeting.

=== Speed dating ===
Speed dating is a structured social event where individuals have a series of short timed conversations (often lasting 3–8 minutes) with multiple potential partners. Participants indicate mutual interest after each encounter, and organisers facilitate contact between matches. Originating in the late 1990s, speed dating was designed to increase efficiency in mate selection. The phenomenon has been used in multiple studies on first impressions and decision-making under time pressure.

Events are typically held in social venues, such as restaurants or bars, where participants rotate between brief interviews with different partners, often meeting up to 20 people in a single session.

Its main advantages include efficiency and cost-effectiveness, allowing participants to meet many people in a short period of time. However, critics note that the format can resemble a beauty contest, where more physically attractive participants receive the majority of offers, while factors such as personality and intelligence may be overlooked due to limited interaction time, especially in large groups or shorter sessions.

=== Multi-partner dating ===
Multi-partner dating refer to romantic or sexual relationships involving more than two participants, with informed consent from all parties. These arrangements can take many forms, such as triads, quads, polyamorous or open relationship networks, and are based on transparency, ethics and negotiated boundaries.

=== Historical forms of dating ===
- Video dating systems of the 1980s and 1990s especially, where customers gave a performance on (typically VHS) video, which was viewable by other customers, usually in private, in the same facility. Some services would record and play back videos for men and women on alternate days to minimize the chance that customers would meet each other on the street.
- Phone dating systems of about the same vintage, where customers call a common voice mail or phone-chat server at a common local phone number, and are connected with other (reputed) singles, and typically charged by the minute as if it were a long-distance call (often a very expensive one). A key problem of such systems was that they were hard to differentiate from a phone porn service or "phone sex" where female operators are paid to arouse male customers and have no intention of ever dating them.

== Wide variation in behavior patterns ==
Social rules regarding dating vary considerably according to variables such as social class, race, religion, age, sexual orientation and gender. Behavior patterns and dating preferences are generally unwritten and constantly changing. There are considerable differences between social and personal values. Social inequality is observed in dating.

=== Gendered norms and preferences ===
Gendered heterosexual dating norms men have been given include asking someone out, planning dates, paying for dates, and proposing marriage. Women on the other hand are positioned as having a more limited scope of action and selectivity with regards of participation in the date, but a greater and more active responsibility in relationships and marriage. Sociologists studying dating scripts have also determined that much of the popular dating literature continues to reinforce traditional notions of masculinity (agency) and femininity (passive).

Online dating patterns suggest that men are more likely to initiate online exchanges (over 75%) and extrapolate that men are less "choosy", seek younger women, and "cast a wide net". One common gendered dating preference is that heterosexual men prefer women's physical attractiveness more than reverse. In a similar vein, the stereotype for heterosexual women is that they seek well-educated men who are their age or older with high-paying jobs. Evolutionary psychology suggests that "women are the choosier of the genders" since "reproduction is a much larger investment for women" who have "more to lose by making bad choices." Women's endorsement of gendered dating norms tends to increase with benevolent sexism, preference for dominant men and long-term relationships. Some women perceive benevolent gendered dating norms benefit them, such as "women should be protected and taken care of by men".

Gendered dating norms and chivalry in dating have been described as sexist. The online dating app Bumble enforced until 2024 the gendered dating norm that heterosexual women send the first message after matching.

In countries with reversal of the gender gap in education, such as parts of Europe, a switch of educational hypergamy from men to women showing on average higher educational attainment was observed in heterosexual couples.

=== Gender egalitarian norms ===
Gender egalitarian dating norms have no gendered differences in dating norms, in line with gender equality. Treat both people as equals. No one takes on a fixed, traditional role based on their sex; instead, partners share responsibilities, both people can initiate dates, and expenses and chores are divided equally. Going dutch at dates refers to the equal split of the bill at dates. In an equal relationship, partners discuss what they want openly from the start. This communication replaces unspoken dating "rules" with clear, mutual respect.

However, when traditional gender roles persist in dating, but gender equality is promoted in the workplace, it can create role conflict for individuals between their personal and professional lives. Some women reject gender equal norms, such as women approaching men, due to fear of rejection or avoid slut-shaming.

=== Level of commitment ===
Dating practices can vary in the degree of commitment and emotional involvement, for example, relationships can be committed, monogamous, non-monogamous, or casual. The preference of casual or committed dating depends on age and gender. Individuals signal their preferred degree of commitment through social or digital cues. The credibility of commitment preferences is reduced with cheap talk and increases with costly signals. Commitment is connected to dating stability. In heterosexual dating gendered initiation results in higher number of options for women during initiation and non-committed dating, while for commitment the bargaining power is more balanced.

=== Age ===
Dating can happen for people in most age groups with the possible exception of young children. Teenagers and tweens have been described as dating; according to the CDC, three-quarters of eighth and ninth graders in the United States described themselves as "dating", although it is unclear what is exactly meant by this term. A 2018 study in the Journal of Youth and Adolescence found that serious dating among teenagers can have negative affects on a teenager's mood. This is most likely due to the incomplete cognitive and emotional development of teenagers that cause a lack of ability to handle the challenging aspects of romantic relationships.

Young persons are exposed to many people their own age in their high schools or secondary schools or college or universities. There is anecdotal evidence that traditional dating—one-on-one public outings—has declined rapidly among the younger generation in the United States in favor of less intimate sexual encounters sometimes known as hookups, described as brief sexual experiences with "no strings attached", although exactly what is meant by the term hookup varies considerably. Dating is being bypassed and is seen as archaic, and relationships are sometimes seen as "greedy" by taking time away from other activities, although exclusive relationships form later. Some college newspapers have decried the lack of dating on campuses after a 2001 study was published, and conservative groups have promoted "traditional" dating. When young people are in school, they have a lot of access to people their own age, and do not need tools such as online websites or dating services. Chinese writer Lao Wai, writing to homeland Chinese about America, considered that the college years were the "golden age of dating" for Americans, when Americans dated more than at any other time in their life. There are indications that people in their twenties are more focused on careers than marriage.

People over thirty, lacking recent college experience, have better luck online finding partners. Economist Sylvia Ann Hewlett in 2002 found that 55% of 35-year-old career women were childless, while 19% of male corporate executives were, and concluded that "the rule of thumb seems to be that the more successful the woman, the less likely it is she will find a husband or bear a child."

While people tend to date others close to their own age, age disparity in sexual relationships varies. In many countries, the older-man-younger-woman arrangement is seen as permissible or preferable. In China, older men with younger women are more likely to be described as "weird uncles" rather than "silver foxes." Older women in relationships with younger men have recently been described as "cougars", and formerly such relationships were often kept secret or discreet, but there is a report that such relationships are becoming more accepted and increasing.

Since divorce is increasing in many areas, there is dating advice for the freshly divorced as well, which includes not talking about your ex or your divorce but focusing on "activities that bring joy to your life." Adviser Claire Rayner in The Guardian suggests calling people from your address book with whom you haven't been in touch for years and say "I'd love to get back in contact." It's more acceptable for this group for women to ask men out.

=== LGBTQ+ ===
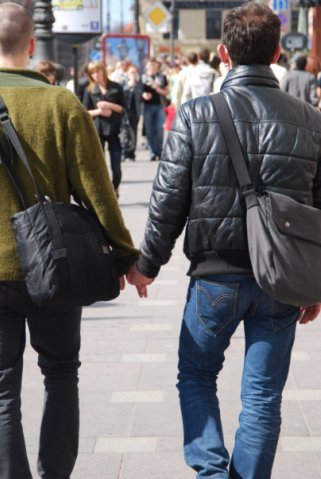
A same-sex male couple holding hands on the street

Dating behavior of non-heterosexual individuals does not always reflect their self-ascribed sexual orientation. Some people recognize from an early age that they are attracted to the same sex or both/all sexes but may initially adhere to heterosexual norms in their dating behaviors. Some individuals who identify as LGBTQ+ but are questioning or have not come out to their peers and family, may wait years before they start dating their preferred sex. According to a Psychology Today report, men who identify as homosexual recognize their same-sex attraction in their late teens or early twenties, and tend to care more about physical attractiveness than status of a prospective partner. Men who identify as homosexual, on average, tend to have more sexual partners, while women who identify as lesbian tend to form steadier one-on-one relationships, and tend to be less promiscuous than heterosexual women. In India, transgender individuals and eunuchs have used online dating to help them find partners, but there continue to be strong societal pressures which marginalize them.

== Initiation ==
There are numerous ways people meet potential dates, including blind dates, classified ads, dating websites, hobbies, holidays, office romance, social networking, speed dating, or simply talking in public places, vehicles, or houses. A Pew study in 2005 which examined Internet users in long-term relationships including marriage, found that many met by contacts at work or at school. The survey found that 55% of relationship-seeking singles agreed that it was "difficult to meet people where they live." Work is a common place to meet potential spouses, although there are some indications that the Internet is overtaking the workplace as an introduction venue.

People can meet other people on their own or the get-together can be arranged by someone else. Friends remain a common way for people to meet. However, the Internet promises to overtake friends in the future if present trends continue. A friend can introduce two people who do not know each other, and the friend may play matchmaker and send them on a blind date. Parents can introduce their children to each other via their contacts with associates, neighbors, or friends. In India, parents often place matrimonial ads in newspapers or online, and may post the resumes of the prospective bride or groom.

Finding the right person for dating can be described by matching theory and search theory. Assortative dating can be explained by individual preferences. Due to adverse selection and imperfect information dating can show market failures.

=== Matchmaking systems and services ===
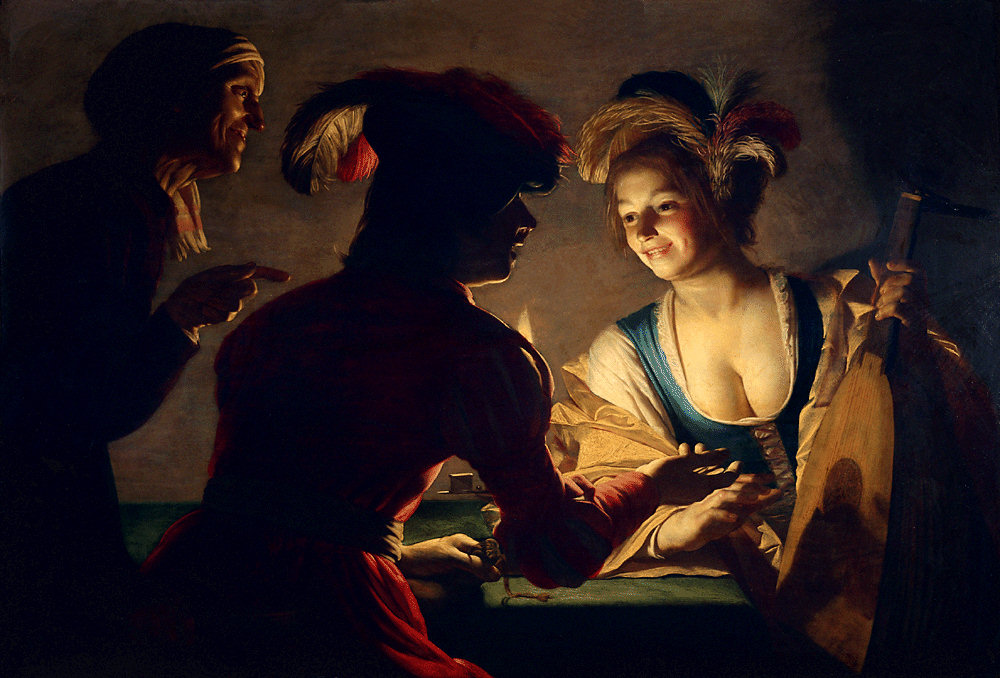
The Matchmaker, painting by Gerard van Honthorst

As technology progressed the dating world progressed as well. In particular, computers, image and video systems, and the internet have all played a large role in dating services. In a timeline by Metro, a statistic matchmaking business opened in 1941, the first reality TV dating show was developed in 1965, and by the 1980s the public was introduced to video dating. Video dating was a way for singles to create and share dating profiles in the form of videos. A person would usually sit in front of a camera and tell whoever may be watching something about themselves. This was frequently coordinated by a dating service that could conduct an interview for the video and show the video to prospective partners. If someone showed interest in a video, the dating service would invite the author of the video in to reciprocally view the interested party's own video. Compared to text-only personal ads, users could hear a voice, see a face and watch body language to determine a physical attraction to the candidates. Compared to in-person dating, users could avoid face-to-face rejection by leveraging the dating service as a neutral third party.

In online dating, individuals create profiles where they disclose personal information, photographs, hobbies, interests, religion and expectations. Then the user can search through hundreds of thousands of accounts and connect with multiple people at once which in return, gives the user more options and more opportunity to find what meets their standards. Online dating has influenced the idea of choice. In Modern Romance: An Investigation, Aziz Ansari states that one third of marriages in the United States between 2005 and 2012 met through online dating services. Today there are hundreds of sites to choose from and websites designed to fit specific needs such as Match, eHarmony, OkCupid, Zoosk, and ChristianMingle. Mobile apps, such as Grindr and Tinder allow users to upload profiles that are then judged by others on the service; one can either swipe right on a profile (indicating interest) or swipe left (which presents another possible mate).

Online dating tools are an alternate way to meet potential dates. Many people use mobile apps such as Tinder, Grindr, or Bumble which allow a user to accept or reject another user with a single swipe of a finger. Some critics have suggested that matchmaking algorithms are imperfect and are "no better than chance" for the task of identifying acceptable partners. Others have suggested that the speed and availability of emerging technologies may be undermining the possibility for couples to have long-term meaningful relationships when finding a replacement partner has potentially become too easy. Matchmaking services can have a principal–agent problem due to conflicts of interest between couples and a matchmaking platform.

Dating systems can be systematic and organized ways to improve matchmaking by using rules or technology. The meeting can be in-person or live and separated by time or space, such as by telephone or email or chat-based. The purpose of the meeting is for the two persons to decide whether to go on a date in the future.

=== Computers as matchmakers ===
Computer dating systems of the later 20th century, especially popular in the 1960s and 1970s, before the rise of sophisticated phone and computer systems, gave customers forms that they filled out with important tolerances and dating preferences, which were "matched by computer" to determine "compatibility" of the two customers. The history of dating systems is closely tied to the history of technologies that support them, although a statistics-based dating service that used data from forms filled out by customers opened in Newark, New Jersey in 1941.

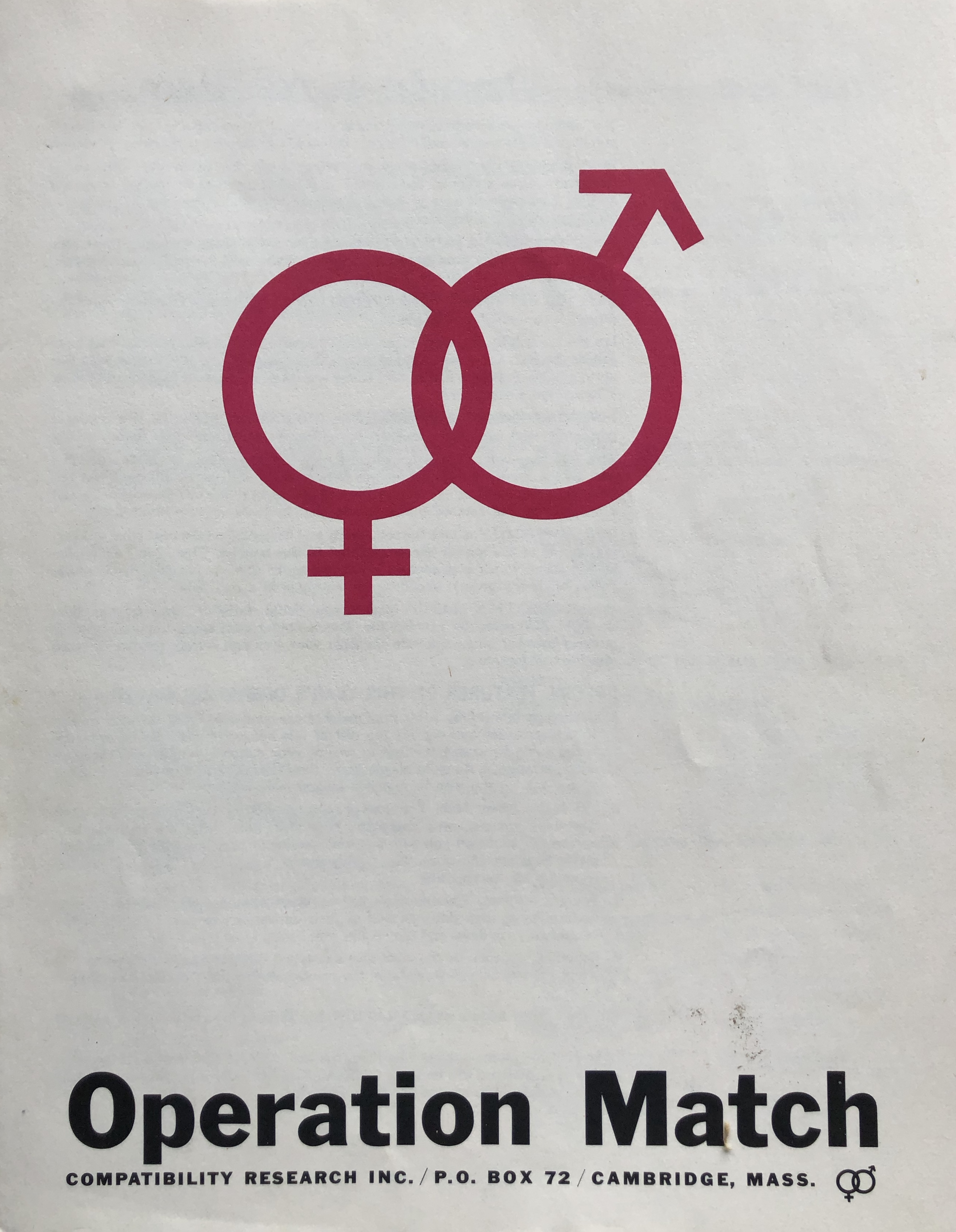
Cover of the questionnaire used by Operation Match, the first computer dating service in the United States

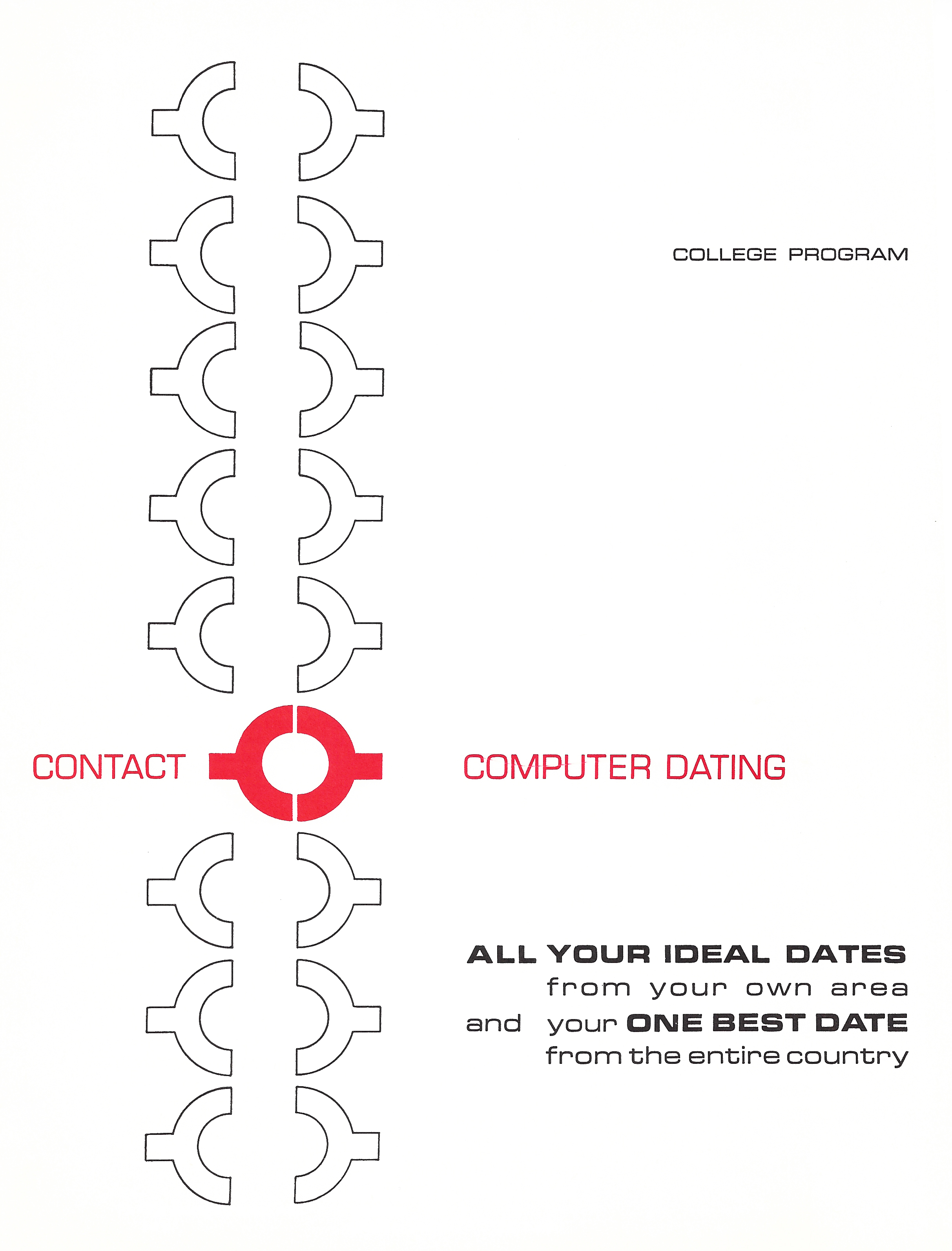
Contact battled Operation Match for the U.S. college market in 1965-1967.

The first large-scale computer dating system, The Scientific Marriage Foundation, was established in 1957 by Dr. George W. Crane. In this system, forms that applicants filled out were processed by an IBM card sorting machine. The earliest commercially successful computerized dating service in either the US or the UK was Com-Pat, started by Joan Ball in 1964. Operation Match, started by Harvard University students a year later is often erroneously claimed to be the "first computerized dating service." In actuality, both Com-Pat and Operation Match were preceded by other computerized dating services in Europe—the founders of Operation Match and Joan Ball of Com-Pat both stated they had heard about these European computer dating services and that those served as the inspiration for their respective ideas to create computer dating businesses.

The longest running and most successful early computer dating business, both in terms of numbers of users and in terms of profits, was Dateline, which was started in the UK in 1965 by John Patterson. Patterson's business model was not fully legal, however. He was charged with fraud on several occasions for selling lists of the women who signed up for his service to men who were looking for prostitutes. Dateline existed until Patterson's death from alcoholism in 1997, and during the early 1990s it was reported to be the most profitable computer dating company in the world.

In the early 1980s in New York City, software developers wrote algorithms to match singles romantically, sometimes using collaborative filtering technologies.

Compatibility algorithms and matching software are becoming increasingly sophisticated.

=== Using the Internet ===
Online dating services charge users a fee to post profiles, perhaps using video or still images, descriptive data, and personal preferences for dating, such as age range, hobbies, and so forth. Online dating was a $2 billion per year industry, as of 2014, with an annual growth rate of 5%. The industry is dominated by a few large companies, such as EHarmony, Zoosk, and InterActiveCorp, or IAC, which owns several brands including Match.com and OkCupid, and new entrants continue to emerge.

Online dating businesses are thriving financially, with growth in members, service offerings, and membership fees and many users renewing their accounts. However, the overall share of Internet traffic using online dating services in the U.S. has declined from 2003 (21% of all Internet users) to 2006 (10%). There is widespread evidence that online dating has increased rapidly and is becoming "mainstream" with new websites appearing regularly. One study suggested that 34% of men and 27% women have used the Internet for dating purposes, and that American's willingness to try it has been on the rise. While online dating has become more accepted, it retains a slight stigma. After controversies such as the 2015 hacking of Ashley Madison user data, dating sites must work to convince users that they are safe places with quality members.

Reports vary about the effectiveness of dating web sites to result in marriages or long–term relationships. Pew Research, based on a 2005 survey of 3,215 adults, estimated that three million Americans had entered into long-term relationships or marriage as a result of meeting on a dating web site. While sites have touted marriage rates from 10% to 25%, sociologists and marriage researchers are highly skeptical that valid statistics underlie any such claims.

The Pew study (see table) suggested the Internet was becoming increasingly prominent and accepted as a way to meet people for dates, although there were cautions about deception, the risk of violence, and some concerns about stigmas. The report suggested most people had positive experiences with online dating websites and felt they were excellent ways to meet more people. The report also said that online daters tend to have more liberal social attitudes compared to the general population.

Research from Berkeley University in California suggests a drop-off in interest after online daters meet face-to-face. It is a lean medium not offering standard cues such as tone of voice, gestures, and facial expressions. There is substantial data about online dating habits; for example, researchers believe that "the likelihood of a reply to a message sent by one online dater to another drops roughly 0.7 percent with every day that goes by". Psychologist Lindsay Shaw Taylor found that even though people said they would be willing to date someone of a different race, that people tend to choose dates similar to themselves.

Online website usage survey
Estimate	%
Internet users who've used it romantically	74%
Know somebody who found long-term partner via Internet	15%
Know someone who's used a dating website	31%
Know someone who's gone on a date after visiting a website	26%
Agree online dating can be dangerous	66%
Don't think online dating is dangerous	25%
Believe online dating is for those in "dire straits"	29%
Gone on a dating website	10%

Virtual dating incorporates elements of video-game play and dating. Users create avatars and spend time in virtual worlds in an attempt to meet other avatars with the purpose of meeting for potential dates.

Mobile dating or cellphone dating refers to exchanging text messages to express interest in others on the system. These may be web-based or online as well, depending on the company.

At a singles event, a group of singles are brought together to take part in various activities for the purposes of meeting new people. Events might include parties, workshops, and games. Many events are aimed at singles of particular affiliations, interests, or religions.

== Evaluation ==
The purpose of dating is to explore attraction, get to know another person, deepen connection, and foster meaningful, lasting relationships with potential or existing partners, often as a way to form, develop, or maintain romantic relationships. Physical characteristics, personality, financial status, and other aspects of the involved persons are often judged, and as a result, feelings can be hurt and confidence shaken. Because of the uncertainty of the whole situation, the desire to be acceptable to the other person, and the possibility of rejection, dating can be very stressful for all parties involved.

The first date is considered important, sometimes for making a good first impression, or because dating may lead to a more serious relationship, or a breakup, or friendzoning. If the relationship progresses, the next steps may include meeting the parents or other family and eventually cohabitation, engagement, and marriage. Even after the relationship develops, couples still may organize a date or "date night".

While some of what happens on a date is guided by an understanding of basic, unspoken rules, there is considerable room to experiment, and there are numerous sources of advice available. Sources of advice include magazine articles, self-help books, dating coaches, friends, and many other sources. The advice given can pertain to all facets of dating, including such aspects as where to go, what to say, what not to say, what to wear, how to end a date, how to flirt, and differing approaches regarding first dates versus subsequent dates. In addition, advice can apply to periods before a date, such as how to meet prospective partners, as well as after a date, such as how to break off a relationship.

There are now more than 350 businesses that offer dating coach services in the US and the number of these businesses has surged since 2005. Frequency of dating varies by person and situation; among singles actively seeking partners, 36% had been on no dates in the past three months, 13% had one date, 22% had two to four dates, and 25% had five or more dates, according to a 2005 US survey.

Judi James, author of The Body Language Bible, suggests specific body language behaviors to note during a date:

The date's probably not going so well if they start to scan the room, drop eye contact, open their body to the room rather than concentrating on you, drink quickly in an effort to escape, increase their blink rate - which signals boredom or irritation - or start carrying out self-attack gestures such as lip-biting or nail-picking.

— Judi James in The Guardian,

== Controversy ==
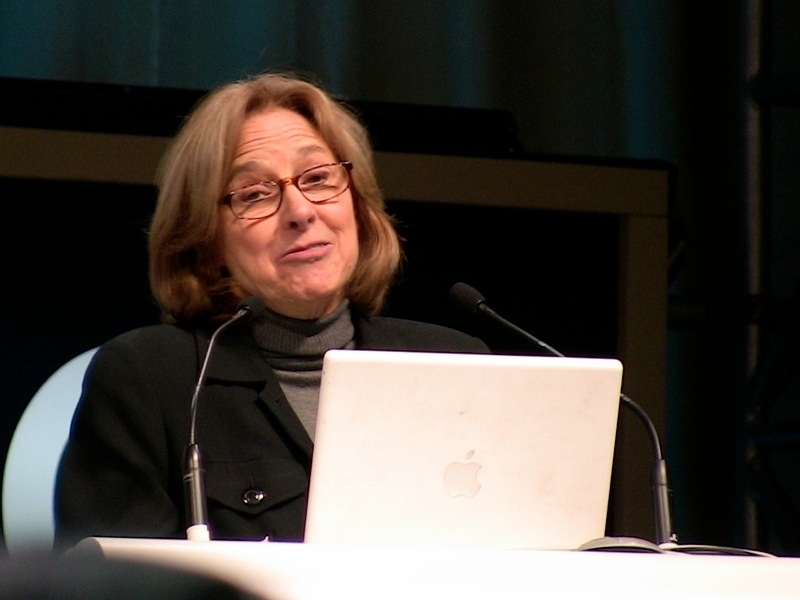
Anthropologist Helen Fisher in 2008

What happens in the dating world can reflect larger currents within popular culture. For example, when the 1995 book The Rules appeared, it touched off media controversy about how men and women should relate to each other, with different positions taken by columnist Maureen Dowd of The New York Times and British writer Kira Cochrane of The Guardian and others. It has even caused anthropologists such as Helen Fisher to suggest that dating is a game designed to "impress and capture" which is not about "honesty" but "novelty", "excitement", and even "danger", which can boost dopamine levels in the brain. Advice columnist April Masini of Relationship Advice Forum-Ask April has weighed in on such evolving norms, suggesting that whoever plans the date should also be the one to pay. The subject of dating has spun off popular culture terms such as the friend zone which refers to a situation in which a dating relation evolves into a platonic non-sexual union.

A 2020 opinion poll found 53% of people in the United States find it difficult to find someone looking for the same type of relationship, 65% below 40 find it difficult to approach others, 38% below 40 find no one is interested in dating them, and 56% of women and 35% of men find it difficult to find someone meeting their expectations.

== Dating violence ==
According to one report, there was a 10% chance of violence between students happening between a boyfriend and girlfriend, sometimes described as "intimate partner violence", over a 12–month period. A 2004 estimate was that 20% of US high school girls aged 14–18 were "hit, slapped, shoved or forced into sexual activity". Several studies suggest that 12% to 15% of men, and 21% to 40% of women have been involved in some form of dating and courtship violence. Violence while dating isn't limited to any one culture or group or religion, but remains an issue in different countries (It is usually the female who is the victim, but there have been cases where males have been hurt as well.). Sara McCorquodale suggests that women meeting strangers on dates meet initially in busy public places, share details of upcoming dates with friends or family so they know where they will be and who they will be with, avoid revealing one's surname or address, and conduct searches on them on the Internet prior to the date. One advisor suggested: "Don't leave drinks unattended; have an exit plan if things go badly; and ask a friend to call you on your cell phone an hour into the date to ask how it's going."

== Media ==
=== Board games ===
Mystery Date is a board game from the Milton Bradley Company, originally released in 1965 and reissued in 1970, 1999, and 2005, whose object is to be ready for a date by acquiring three matching color-coded cards to assemble an outfit. The outfit must then match the outfit of the date at the "mystery door". If the player's outfit does not match the date behind the door, the door is closed, and play continues.The game has been mentioned, featured, or parodied in several popular films and television shows.

=== Television ===
Numerous television reality and game shows, past and current, address dating. For example, the dating game shows The Dating Game first aired in 1965, while more modern shows in that genre include The Manhattan Dating Project, Blind Date, The 5th Wheel, and The Bachelor and its spinoff series, in which a high degree of support and aids are provided to individuals seeking dates. These are described more fully here and in the related article on "reality game shows" that often include or motivate romantic episodes between players. Another category of dating-oriented reality TV shows involves matchmaking, such as Millionaire Matchmaker and Tough Love. A popular dating-themed TV show in the UK is Take Me Out.

== See also ==
- Age disparity in sexual relationships
- Charity dating
- Comparison of online dating services
- Group dating
- Interpersonal attraction
- Principle of least interest
- Secret dating
- Seduction
- Teen dating violence
- Treating

== Bibliography ==
- Sizer-Webb, Frances; Eleanor Noss DeBruyne; Linda Kelly DeBruyne (2000). Health: Making Life Choices. Glencoe/McGraw-Hill. pp. 499–500.
- Dowell, Max (2014). Changing The Dating Game. Owlets Media.
- Havelin, Kate (2000). Dating: What Is a Healthy Relationship?. Capstone Press.
