= Bishop's Stortford College =

School in Bishop's Stortford, Hertfordshire, England

Coordinates: 51°52′12″N 00°09′07″E

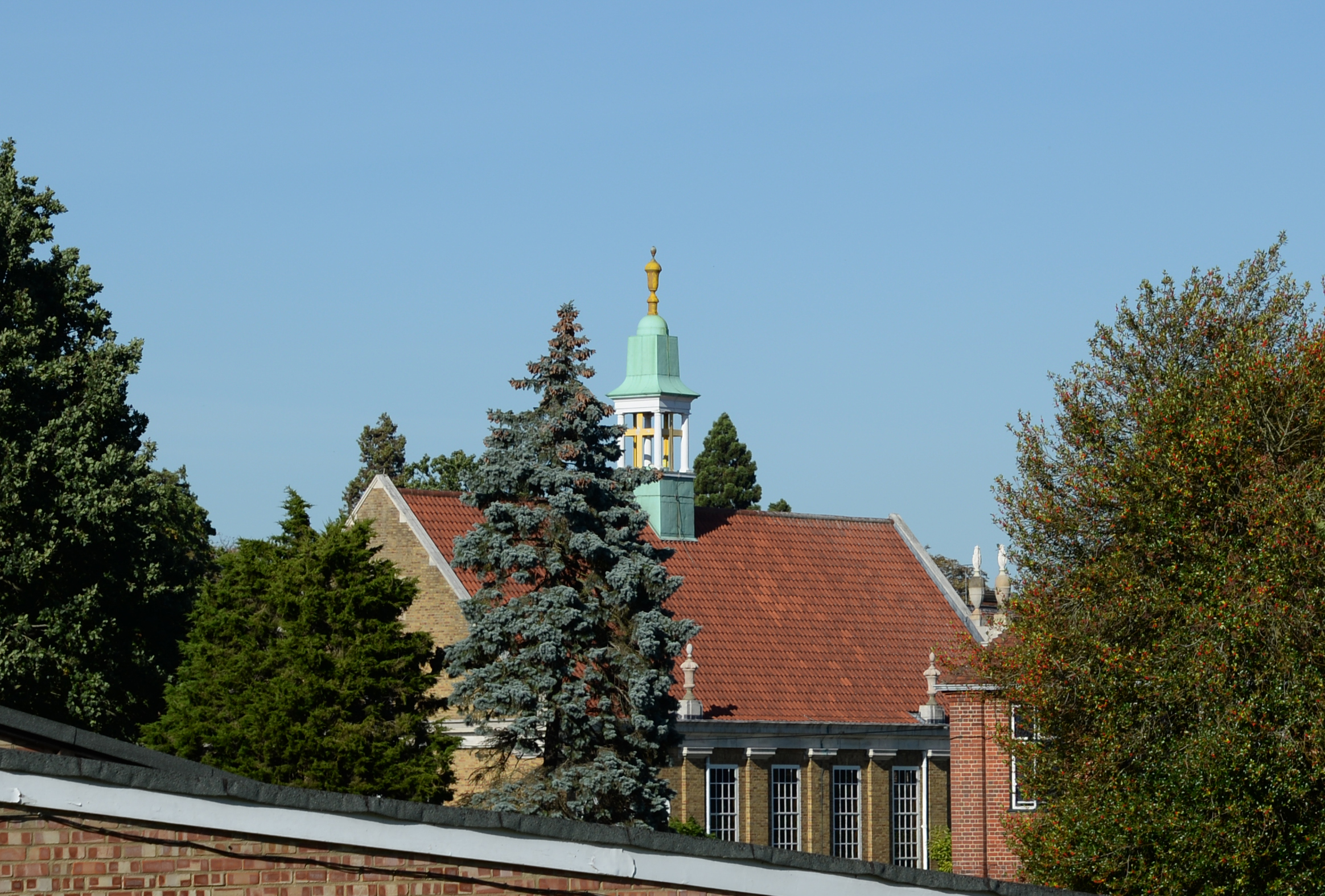

Location
- School House, Maze Green Road; Bishop's Stortford, Hertfordshire, CM23 2PQ; United Kingdom

Information
- Type: Private day & boarding school
- Motto: Soli Deo Gloria (Glory to God alone)
- Religious affiliations: Christian, non-denominational
- Established: 1868; 158 years ago
- Founder: East of England Nonconformist Schools Association
- Local authority: Hertfordshire
- Chair of the Governors: GE Baker
- College head: Iain Kilpatrick
- Gender: Co-educational
- Age: 4 to 18
- Enrolment: 1,300~
- Houses: 10 (Senior); 1 (Prep boarding)
- Alumni: Old Stortfordians
- Website: bishopsstortfordcollege.org

Bishop's Stortford College is a private boarding and day school in the English public school tradition for more than 1,200 pupils aged 4–18, situated in a 130-acre (0.53 km^{2}) campus on the edge of the market town of Bishop's Stortford, Hertfordshire, England.

As an "all-through" school, it is a member of both the Headmasters' and Headmistresses' Conference and the Independent Association of Preparatory Schools. It is also a founding member of the Bishop's Stortford Educational Trust, a consortium of local primary and secondary schools, and currently the only such trust in the UK to involve both state and independent sectors.

The college head is John Maguire.

== History ==
The college was founded in 1868 by a group of East Anglian Nonconformists who wanted to establish a public school "in which Evangelical Nonconformists might secure for their boys, an effective and Christian education on terms that should not be beyond the reach of the middle class generally".

They approached the Bishop's Stortford Collegiate School, a non-sectarian school founded in 1850, and acquired the buildings, renaming it The Nonconformist Grammar School. It was inaugurated on 23 September 1868, with 40 pupils, including 17 boarders, under the headship of Rev Richard Alliott, who remained in the post until his death in 1899.

Former pupil Francis Young became second headmaster in 1900. During his 31-year tenure the roll increased from 90 pupils to nearly 400. Among Young's first acts were: renaming it the Bishop's Stortford College in 1901, to avoid confusion with the town's rival grammar school; in 1902 taking over an existing school for boys aged 8–13 years, which became the preparatory department; and in 1904 changing the school's status from private commercial ownership to publicly endowed. He commissioned many of the campus's redbrick buildings designed in the arts and crafts style by architect and former pupil Herbert Ibberson, acquired the 100 acre sports fields and oversaw construction of the Memorial Hall, commemorating Old Stortfordians who had died in the Great War.

The college changed status in 1945, from a direct grant school to an independent public school. It celebrated its centenary in 1968 with a major building programme and a visit by HM Queen Elizabeth the Queen Mother, followed in 1969 with a book, Bishop’s Stortford College: A Centenary Chronicle.

September 1977 saw the first four girls admitted, and the following year the first girls' house, Young, opened. In 1995 the college became fully coeducational.

In the early hours of 29 September 2015 Robert Pearce boarding house was devastated by fire. Pupils and staff were evacuated safely but the building lost its roof and burned down to the bricks. It was renovated and reopened in January 2018, in time for the college's 150th anniversary, which was commemorated in the book, Bishop's Stortford College: Celebrating 150 Years 1868-2018.

On 1 September 2020 Kathy Crewe-Read, formerly head of Wolverhampton Grammar School, became the first woman to lead the school and only the tenth head in its 152-year history. John Maguire took over as head in September 2024.

== College heads ==
In its first century, the college had just five headmasters.

- 1868–1899: Rev Richard Alliott
- 1900–1931: Francis S Young
- 1932–1943: H Leo Price
- 1944–1957: AN Evans
- 1957–1970: Peter Rowe
- 1970–1984: Colin Greetham
- 1984–1997: Stephen George Garnett Benson
- 1997–2011: John Trotman
- 2011–2020: Jeremy Gladwin
- 2020–2024: Kathy Crewe-Read
- 2024–2026: John Maguire
- 2026-Current: Iain Kilpatrick

== Present day ==
There are 1,307 pupils at Bishop's Stortford College: 674 in the Senior School (aged 13–18), including 271 in the Sixth Form, 506 in the Prep School (aged 7–13) and 127 in Pre-Prep (aged 4–7). Pupils board from the age of seven. The Senior School has 160 boarders, including full, weekly and flexi; the Prep School has 35 full, weekly or flexi-boarders.

In 2020, the college produced its best GCSE results, with 79% of all grades at 9-7 (up from 76% in 2019). At A Level, students achieved a 100% pass rate in 2020, with 86% of results graded A*-B and 62% at A*-A.

The latest Independent Schools Inspectorate Education Quality Inspection report, published in March 2017, found that "the quality of the pupils' academic and other achievements is excellent", with pupils displaying "excellent attitudes towards their learning and highly developed study skills". The report also stated that "the school is highly successful in creating an ethic of hard work and enthusiastic participation".

Since 2009 it has hosted an annual Festival of Literature, which is open to the public and includes events for local primary schools.

== College facilities ==
The FS Young Library was built in 1936 as a memorial to FS Young, college headmaster from 1900 to 1931. Since 1992 it has been run by qualified librarians and is fully supervised for 70 hours a week to provide research and study facilities and assistance for pupils and staff. It has an archive of college records, publications, photographs, cuttings, and memorabilia including old uniforms from the college's early days.

Sports facilities include a sports hall, fitness centre and indoor pool, opened in 2002 by Olympian swimmer Duncan Goodhew. The playing fields cover more than 100 acres, including twelve rugby pitches, seven cricket squares and sixteen cricket nets, three grass hockey pitches, five football pitches and a grass running track. There are also two floodlit AstroTurf hockey pitches hockey, all-weather surface courts for netball and tennis and a multi-use games area.

The college has been included in The Cricketer magazine's guide to cricket's top 100 schools in England since 2017 and the Prep School is in the top 50 for the first time in the 2021 edition. In 2020 it became an MCC Foundation Cricket Hub, providing free cricketing facilities and coaching to state-educated young cricketers.

The Grade II listed Memorial Hall has been used for assemblies, concerts and special events since it was formally opened in 1922 by Sir Arthur Quiller-Couch. Designed by architect Bertram Clough Williams-Ellis (creator of the Italianate village of Portmeirion in North Wales), it was built to commemorate the 62 former college boys who had died in the First World War. The doors were given in memory of EA Knight, a master killed on active service in Belgium in 1917. A second Roll of Honour was added in 1949, inscribed with the names of a further 92 former students who died while serving in the Second World War. Wooden chairs in the hall had names individually carved for dedication.

The Ferguson Building, opened in 2007 and named after Old Stortfordian Professor John Ferguson, who was a founding member of the Open University, provides a lecture theatre for up to 180 people, meeting room, ICT suite and sixth form social centre. It is built on the site of the old indoor swimming pool and retains some of its original features. It hosts the Ferguson Lectures, which focus on contemporary issues and are open to the public.

Other facilities include the purpose-built Charles Edwards Centre, which houses ICT, physics and design and technology, and the Walter Strachan Art Centre, which has a sculpture studio, workshop, gallery space, IT suite, sixth-form studio and departmental library.

== Notable alumni ==
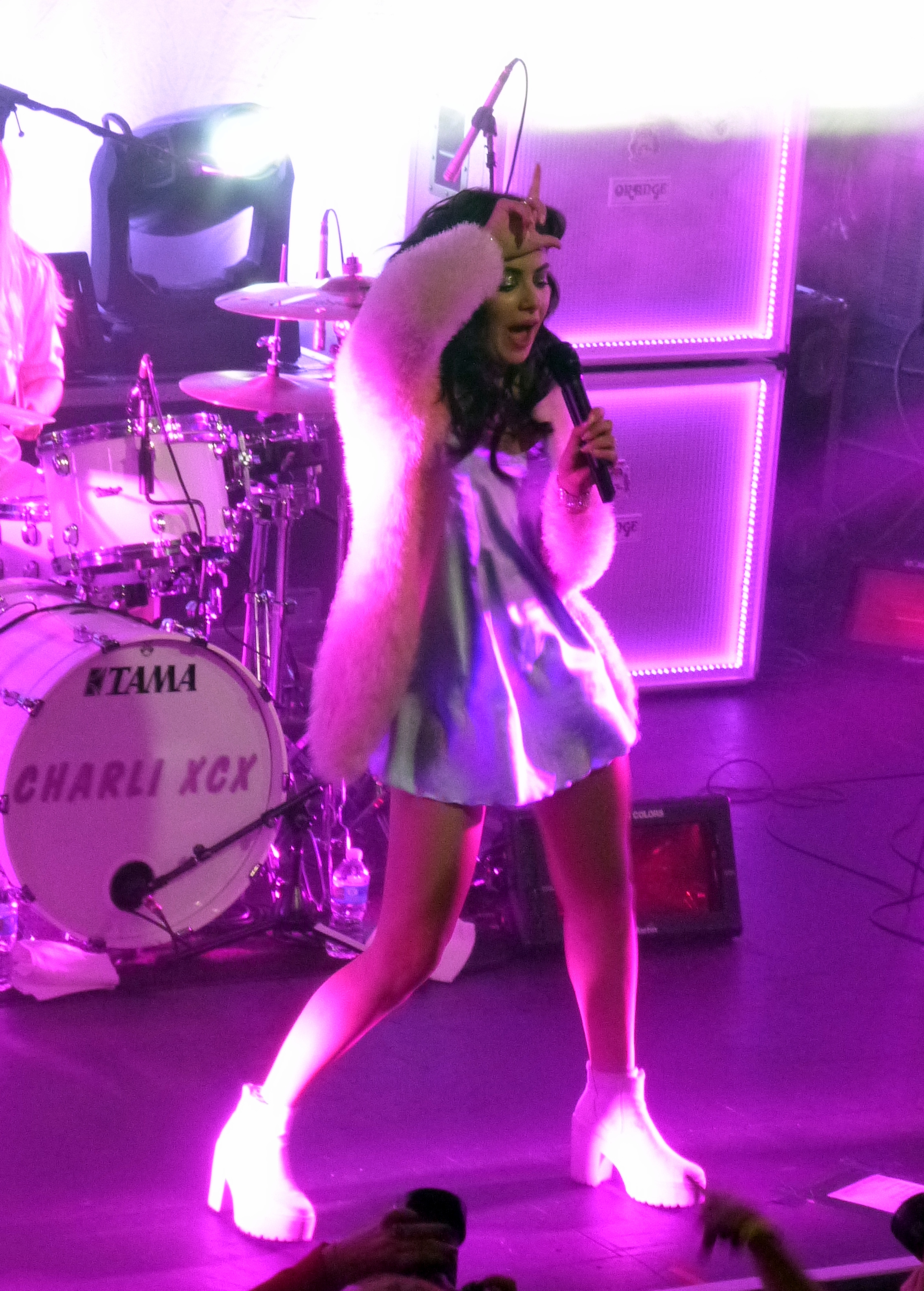
Recent Old Stortfordian Charlotte Aitchison, aka singer-songwriter Charli XCX

Former pupils are known as Old Stortfordians. For a more complete list, see People educated at Bishop's Stortford College.

- Sir Leonard Pearce (1873–1947), electrical engineer, designer of Battersea Power Station
- Grantly Dick-Read (1890–1959), obstetrician, pioneer of natural childbirth
- Lieutenant-Colonel Sir Brett Cloutman (1891–1971) VC, MC, KC, awarded the last Victoria Cross of the First World War
- Wilfred Bion (1897–1979), psychoanalyst, president of the British Psychoanalytical Society, 1962–65
- Malcolm Nokes (1897–1986), Olympic medalist, teacher, soldier, chemist, nuclear scientist
- H Leo Price (1899–1943), hockey and rugby international, Bishop's Stortford College headmaster, 1932–1943
- Clifford Dupont (1905–1978), first President of Rhodesia
- Leader Stirling (1906–2003), missionary surgeon, Health Minister of Tanzania, 1975–1980
- Sir Dick White (1906–1993), Director-General of MI5, 1953–1956, Chief of MI6, 1956–1968
- Alec Clifton-Taylor (1907–1985), architectural historian
- Edward Crankshaw (1909–1984), expert and author on the Soviet Union and the Gestapo
- John Glyn-Jones (1909–1997), actor
- Roger Hilton (1911–1975), painter, pioneer of abstract art
- Denis Greenhill, Baron Greenhill of Harrow (1913–2000), GCMG, Permanent Under-Secretary of the Foreign and Commonwealth Office and Head of the Diplomatic Service, 1969–1973
- Peter Wright (1916–1995), Assistant Director-General of MI5 and author of Spycatcher
- Sir Arthur Bonsall (1917–2014), Director of GCHQ, 1973–1978
- Leslie McLean (1918–1987), cricketer
- General Sir Peter Whiteley (1920–2016), Commander-in-Chief of the Allied Forces in Northern Europe (1977–1979)
- Drummond Allison (1921–1943), Second World War poet
- John Rae (1931–2006), author, headmaster of Westminster School, 1970–1986
- CIM Jones (1934–2016), Olympic hockey player (1960, 1964) and coach, Hertfordshire cricketer, college head of geography 1960–1970, Headmaster of Bedford School
- Dick Clement (born 1937), OBE, television and screenwriter
- John Heddle (1943–1989), politician
- John Richard Patterson (1945–1997), founder of the Dateline computer dating service
- Sir Stephen Lander (born 1947), Director-General of MI5, 1996–2002, and Chair of the Serious Organised Crime Agency, 2004–2009
- Robert Kirby (1948–2009), arranger, best known for his work with Nick Drake
- Andy Peebles (1948–2025), broadcaster
- Alan Lyddiard (born Michael Kent, 1949), theatre and film director
- Bill Sharpe (born 1952), keyboardist and founding member of jazz-funk band Shakatak
- James Duthie (born 1957), hockey player and Great Britain team coach
- James Baxter (born 1967), British animator
- Guy Wilkinson (born 1968), professor of physics at the University of Oxford
- Ben Clarke (born 1968), England rugby union player (1992–1999)
- Alastair Lukies (born 1973), entrepreneur and co-founder of Monitise
- Iain Mackay (born 1985), hockey international, Olympian
- Charli XCX (Charlotte Aitchison; born 1992), multi-award-winning singer-songwriter
- Bobby Brazier (born 2003), model and actor

Notable teachers have included:

- Percy Horton (1897–1970), painter, College art master 1925–1930
- Herbert Sumsion (1899–1995), Organist of Gloucester Cathedral, College director of music 1924–1926
- Brendan Bracken, 1st Viscount Bracken (1901–1958), publisher, politician, First Lord of the Admiralty, College master c.1920–1922
- Bernie Cotton (born 1948), England and Great Britain hockey player and coach, college geography master 1960s, 1970s, 1990s
