= Monitise =

Monitise Plc
- Type: Public
- Industry: Financial services Financial technology
- Predecessor: Subsidiary of Morse Plc, Demerged in 2007
- Founded: 2003 (demerged from Morse in 2007)
- Founders: Alastair Lukies; Steve Atkinson
- Defunct: 2017
- Fate: Acquired
- Successor: Fiserv
- Headquarters: London, United Kingdom
- Key people: Lee Cameron (CEO)
- Products: FINkit - Financial services digital innovation platform
- Revenue: £40m (2016)
- Owners: Visa Inc 5% shareholder, Norway's Norges Bank, 3i Group, Alastair Lukies & public shareholders
- Number of employees: 750 (2013)
- Website: monitise.com

Monitise was a British fintech company that provided mobile banking services and technology for mobile phones to financial institutions.

Monitise was founded by Alastair Lukies and Steven Atkinson in 2003 with headquarters in London, United Kingdom. It also had operations in the United States, Turkey, and Cardiff, Wales.

In 2016 the company reported heavy losses. Shares in Monitise were down 96 per cent between 2014 and 2016. After the losses, the company was acquired by Fiserv, a US provider of financial services technology, on 1 September 2017.

== History ==
=== Foundation ===
Monitise was founded in 2003 by Alastair Lukies and Steven Atkinson, technical architect and head of location services at Vodafone. Securing investment for Monitise proved difficult initially until in 2006, the company became part of Morse Plc. During this period that Monitise built a mobile banking, payments and commerce ecosystem.

In 2006 Monitise announced a joint venture with LINK, provider of the UK's ATM network, to develop mobile banking. In October 2006, HSBC and First Direct launched MONILINK, a mobile banking service developed jointly by Monitise and LINK. It offered customers 24-hour access to banking services via their mobile phone, including mini-statements and balance enquiries.

=== De-merger with Morse ===
In June 2007, Monitise demerged from Morse and the company listed on the London Stock Exchange's AIM in June 2007. The de-merger raised £21.4 million in shares sold to investors and other institutions.

Monitise was named as one of the UK's top 15 fastest growing technology businesses in Deloitte's 2011, 2012 and 2013 Technology Fast 50.

=== 2007-2012 ===
In September 2007, Monitise launched Monitise Americas, a joint venture with Metavante Corporation, a provider of banking and payments technologies to global financial institutions and businesses. To create a mobile banking and payments ecosystem tailored for the North American market, Monitise Americas engineered its platform in order to “deliver a service that is universal in terms of security, access and navigation regardless of the consumer's choice of financial institution or mobile carrier".

On 30 June 2009, Monitise announced that it had entered into a global alliance agreement with Visa International, a subsidiary of Visa Inc. Monitise would work as a partner for Visa's mobile services. These included mobile payments, money transfer, transaction alerts and marketing offers.

In 2011, Monitise signed a partnership agreement with Visa Europe to develop and supply mobile payments services for Visa Europe's member banks and financial institutions across Europe.

Further expansion in 2011 included the creation of a technology and R&D hub in Cardiff, Wales.

=== 2012-2016 ===
On 26 March 2012, Monitise announced its acquisition of Clairmail, a third-party for mobile banking solutions in the U.S. At the time of the acquisition, Monitise and Clairmail had 13 million registered consumers across four continents. Later in 2012, in June and July respectively, Monitise announced partnerships with HSBC and The Co-operative Bank.

In March 2013, Monitise extended its partnership with VISA Europe in a three-year partnership deal. The deal, which enables VISA Europe to license all of Monitise's mobile money technology, covering three product areas: Bank Anywhere, Pay Anyone and Buy Anything. In September 2013 Monitise acquired London-based mobile innovation and design agency Grapple Mobile Ltd, which became known as Monitise Create. Later that month, Monitise announced an alliance with IBM's Smarter Commerce initiative to help extend its mobile banking services to VISA Europe.

In February 2014, Monitise acquired Istanbul-based mobile technology specialist Pozitron, listed as one of the top 10 fastest growing businesses in Turkey by Deloitte. In March 2014, Monitise and MasterCard announced a commercial agreement to accelerate the development and deployment of mobile wallets and digital payment solutions by financial institutions. MasterCard also took a minority stake in Monitise as part of a £109million share-placing. In June 2014, Monitise acquired Markco Media's leading retailer offers, content and discount network, which includes the MyVoucherCodes brand. The acquisition augmented Monitise's Buy Anything mobile commerce product offerings.

In July 2014, Monitise signed an agreement with IBM to develop a data, analytics and machine learning driven customer experience solution aligned with the IBM Next Best Action Signature Solution (Data, Analytics, Reporting, Commerce, Experience, and Mathematical Optimisation) and to underpin their white label mobile banking platform.

In August 2014, Monitise signed a partnership agreement with IBM to extend its relationship, transferring its UK development and integration business, including some contractors, to IBM as part of an expanded agreement from July. Monitise retained customer contracts, IP, and commitments, while cutting its global workforce by over 20%, aiding cost reduction efforts for profitability in 2016.

IBM would host, enable, and sell Monitise’s technology as a cloud-delivered offering, initially targeting financial services but expanding to other sectors. The partnership aligned with Monitise’s shift to a subscription-based model. The transition impacted short-term revenues, and Monitise shares rose 14.2% following the announcement. CEO Alastair Lukies emphasised the deal’s role in scaling operations and global expansion.

In 2015, Monitise announced that revenue declined 6% to £89.7m (FY 2014: £95.1m), changes to the board and progress on transition to cloud. Elizabeth Buse stepped down as CEO and from the Board, on 9 September 2015, and deputy CEO and Chief Commercial Officer Lee Cameron was appointed Monitise's new CEO.

=== Losses and closure ===
In 2016, the company reported heavy losses. Shares in Monitise were down 96 per cent over the previous two years. At the start of 2014 its market cap exceeded £1bn, but by May 2016, its market cap had dropped to £66m. An unsuccessful attempt to sell the company's voucher business and management turnover contributed to the decline.

The company was acquired by Fiserv on the 1 September 2017.
