= Peekawoo =

Defunct dating app

- Initial release: 2013
- Website: peekawoo.com

Peekawoo was a dating application launched in September 2013. It was described as "a dating app made for women that emphasises fun and companionship - and nothing more."

The peekawoo.com website appeared to be down on July 16, 2018.
