= Taimi =

Social network and dating platform for LGBTQI+ people

- Website type: Dating
- Available in: Dutch, English, Finnish, French, German, Italian, Portuguese, Romanian, Spanish
- Owner: Social Impact Inc.
- Creator: Alex Pasykov
- Website: taimi.com
- Commercial: Freemium
- Registration: Required
- Current status: Active

Taimi (/teɪmi/ TAY-mee) is a dating and social media application that serves the LGBTQI+ community. The network matches its registered users based on their selected identity preferences, relationship goals and geographic location. It operates in more than 138 countries, including the US, UK, the Netherlands, Spain, Central and South America, Ukraine, and other European and Asian countries.

== History ==
Taimi was launched as a dating and social networking application for gay men in 2017 by Social Impact, Inc. in Las Vegas. Founders Alex Pasykov, Jake Vygnan and Dmytro Kononov originally called the app "Tame Me," a name that gradually morphed into Taimi. Social Impact and Pasykov had previously launched the popular dating site Hily.

In November 2020 the app was redesigned, with a new interface, branding, and logo to better service the wider LGBTQ+ community . Over time, Taimi expanded into other countries, and expanding its reach to the LGBTQ+ community, so that, by 2022, it was fully inclusive of the entire queer community. To further benefit its members and the LGBTQ+ community, Taimi instituted mental health training for its support staff due to reports that people using dating sites feel increased suicidal thoughts during the Valentine's Day season.

For Christmas 2022, Taimi made headlines for portraying Mr. And Mrs. Claus as a kinky, ethically non-monogamous couple in an effort supporting sex positivity for the holidays. As of 2024, there are over 25 million registered users of Taimi worldwide. Pasykov states that he is an ally of the LGBTQ+ community and that he is focused on, among other things, partnering with NGOs to fight Homophobia and "regressive policies and laws" that negatively impact the community.

== Software + Features ==
Taimi runs on iOS and Android. Taimi’s Vibes feature matches users based on shared energy, values, and personal interests rather than standard location or basic profile traits. There is also an active blog that regularly posts articles and news about events of interest to the LGBTQ+ community.

Profiles include personal information, compatibility preferences, dating style, and relationship goals. The platform offers five gender identity categories – Man, Woman, Trans Man, Trans Woman, and Non-Binary – each with specific sub-gender options totalling 25 (including Genderfluid, Two-spirit, Agender, and Intersex), alongside eight sexuality options: Gay, Lesbian, Bisexual, Pansexual, Queer, Asexual, Demisexual, and Straight. An algorithm then finds and presents recommendations that a user accepts or rejects. Users are then free to chat via text or video with people they have connected with.

Taimi incorporates artificial intelligence into several key areas including matchmaking, safety and in its feedback loop. User responses to new features and policies drive changes and modifications that are made to all aspects of the site. The platform offers multiple sexuality options and customisable pronoun settings. Following a 2024 partnership with GLAAD, users can select multiple sexualities, and non-binary users have access to additional identity subcategories. An In-Person feature allows users to discover and participate in LGBTQ+-related events. A First Move feature gives users control to initiate the conversation. In 2024, Taimi also launched a Polyamory feature.

== Partnerships and Collaborations ==
Taimi has a long history of collaborations and partnerships in Pride events, both in the US and abroad, including fund-raising efforts. Taimi has partnered with Rakuten Viber to create a bot focused on educating its members on key LGBTQ+ topics and to allow queer Viber users to connect.

In 2023, Taimi collaborated with the Known Agency in an "America the Beautiful" campaign to shine a spotlight on current anti-LGBTQ+ policies and laws in a number of US states, and to counter these by highlighting the values and freedoms upon which America was founded. The campaign was nominated for The Drum Awards in the category "OOH For Good" and honored with the ANA Multicultural Excellence Award. Taimi also partnered with Goodparts, a queer-owned and operated retailer, in "The Art of Intimacy For Every Pride Body" campaign focused on love and acceptance of all body types. In this campaign, well-known LGBTQ+ artists are providing artwork for Goodpart's product packaging. From October 31 to December 13, 2023, Taimi showed the "Taimi Moments" video, created in collaboration with Raygun Agency, on large screens between performances of LGBTQ+ artists Doja Cat, Ice Spice, and Doechii on their Scarlet Tour.

In the Spring of 2024, Taimi launched Queer Paradise, a series of live events in Southern California to celebrate diversity, sexual exploration, and dating fluidity. Each event in the series was curated to give the full spectrum of groups within the LGBTQ+ community a space to express their authentic selves. Taimi's partners for Queer Paradise include Hawtmess Productions, Eden Entertainment Group, Hump Events, Girls Gays & Theys, Damn Good Dyke Nights, and Gaybors Agency. In the Summer of 2024, with support from GLAAD, Taimi has updated features and self-expression tools to better serve the LGBTQ+ people seeking connection in the app. Taimi allowed members to select multiple sexualities, unified the list of sexualities across all genders, added more pronoun options, and created a more inclusive and improved list of subcategories for non-binary users. Also, in summer 2024, Taimi launched a polyamory feature and partnered with gender-affirming underwear brand Urbody to release a capsule collection. Focused on gender inclusivity and sexual fluidity, the capsule collection includes a range of underwear and compression tops intended to promote "joy, self-love and empowerment."

In 2025, Taimi launched the “Came For, Stayed For” campaign, created in partnership with Mother London and director Gianna Mazzeo. The same year, Taimi launched new in-person event discovery features. To address the issue of ghosting, in the Spring of 2026, Taimi created an activation in Los Angeles, dressing up actors as ghosts across the city's nightlife corridor, collaborating with venues to create a viral social media campaign over ghost sightings.

== Critical reception ==
Taimi has been included in roundups and best-app lists by a range of publications. In January 2024, Forbes listed it among the ten best LGBTQ+ dating sites and apps. The Telegraph included Taimi in its list of the best gay dating apps in 2023. The “America the Beautiful” campaign with Known Agency received an AdAge A-List & Creativity Award in 2024.
