= Jonathan Douglas (broadcaster) =

Hong Kong broadcaster (1957–2022)

Jonathan "Jo" Douglas (April 11, 1957 – August 26, 2022) was a Hong Kong broadcaster, actor, musician, theatre producer, and director.

== Biography ==
Born in London, Douglas was educated at Bishop's Stortford College and Queen Mary College, where he studied English literature. He began his career with RTHK Radio 4 in 1986, where he presented classical music for three decades. His show, Artbeat, was among the station's regular programming during his tenure.

Douglas's broadcasting career with RTHK Radio 4 also encompassed Morning Call, a program combining classical music, interviews, and arts reviews. Throughout his broadcasting career, he interviewed various personalities in the classical music domain, including Isaac Stern, Joshua Bell, and Tan Dun. Joint Publishing (Hong Kong) published a selection of thirty of these interviews in 2005.

Douglas was also involved in the 2016 production Crystal at the University of Hong Kong's Black Box Theatre, where he contributed original songs. He also co-founded Worldplay, an English-language radio drama festival, partnering with international broadcasters such as the BBC World Service, CBC, and ABC. Among the plays he directed for the festival was a 2002 adaptation of Weekend Quartet, originally penned by Nobel Prize laureate Gao Xingjian.

Douglas's acting credits included roles in plays such as Shakespeare's Hamlet and Samuel Beckett's Endgame. In 1995, he undertook the role of World War I poet Ivor Gurney in The Ivor Gurney Show: The Silent One and revisited the role in 2015. In 2011, in collaboration with his two sons, he participated in the Edinburgh Festival Fringe with The Douglas Trio.

In 2008, Douglas received a Member of the British Empire (MBE) for his contributions to the arts in Hong Kong. Following a mandatory retirement from RTHK in 2017, Douglas performed in Elstob at the Camden Fringe Festival in 2018, focusing on the last day in the life of a World War I soldier. Douglas died in 2022. After his death, his family released his last album, Time and Again, on Spotify, which he had been working on.
