= FlipMe =

Internet-based dating service launched in 2010

FlipMe is an internet-based dating service that launched in 2010. FlipMe products are available throughout the US.

The company provides an alternative to traditional online dating by allowing users to make online connections with people they encounter in their day-to-day lives. As opposed to viewing a profile and arranging a meeting, users of FlipMe are able to establish an in-person connection with someone prior to communicating with them. The service is designed to facilitate such connections while still allowing users to maintain anonymity and protect their personal information.

FlipMe LLC was launched in June, 2010. FlipMe is intended to work as an ice breaker as well as a safe alternative to personal business cards.

== Concept ==
Users purchase a pack of 30 cards, either through the company website or a participating retailer, that they can give to anyone they are attracted to. Each pack of cards comes with an activation code and a three-month subscription to the web site's messaging service. The cards have unique codes linked to the activation code that allow the recipient to contact the member through the website. The company recently released new versions of its signature cards which feature new designs and sayings as well as personalization options. The new cards are accompanied by the company's new slogan "Get a Set." An iPhone and BlackBerry application is reportedly in the works for the service.

== See also ==
- Cheek'd
