= Raya (app) =

American dating and networking app for iOS

- Developers: Raya App, Inc.
- Release: March 2015
- Platform: iPhone, iPad, and iPod Touch
- Size: 123.3 MB
- Available in: English
- Type: Dating and networking
- Website: www.rayatheapp.com

Raya is an American application for iOS, founded by Daniel Gendelman. Originally a dating app, Raya has since added features to promote professional networking and social discovery. Raya’s original niche was limited to celebrities, before opening up to a wider audience.

Raya was created by Daniel Gendelman in 2014 and went live in February 2015. The app is available only on Apple devices.

Users link their profile to their Instagram account, add personal information, including their background, profession, and interests, and must create a photo montage for their profile.

If a user screenshots a profile within the app, Raya warns the user that they may be removed from the platform, and repeated screenshots lead to termination of the user’s account.
