= Charity dating =

Fund development process

Charity dating is a process of raising money for charity by being taken on a date by someone who will donate money to charity for the privilege. It is common for celebrities to help charitable causes by auctioning off a paid date with themselves to a loyal audience, which sees a great value in such a date.

== History ==
With the rise of celebrity culture many people are willing to pay large sums to meet their favorite celebrity. For example, Scarlett Johansson auctioned a pair of tickets to attend the premiere of her 2009 movie He's Just Not That Into You, raising $40,100 for Oxfam.

== Formats ==
The most common form of celebrity date auctions is through a charity fundraising event. These events are organized by charities or other parties and usually include dinner, speakers and other entertainment.

More recently, the online auction site eBay has been used to allow a wider audience to bid for a date with a celebrity. One common auction is for the chance to attend a film premiere with the celebrity. Examples include Scarlett Johansson, Kristin Davis, and Colin Firth.

In May 2009, GiveAndDate.com launched in New York City. In September 2009, The Chronicle of Philanthropy profiled how the for-profit dating site accepts donations to partnered charities when one user wants to send a message to another user.
