= Alastair Lukies =

Alastair David Lukies CBE (born 1973 Harlow, United Kingdom) is a British entrepreneur who is involved in mobile communications.

In 2003, Lukies co-founded Monitise. In 2006, he was recognised as a Technology Pioneer by the World Economic Forum.

== Biography ==
Lukies was born to Robert Lukies and Melanie Harris. He studied at Bishop's Stortford College in Bishop's Stortford, Hertfordshire. At age 16, he left school to play rugby for teams including Middlesex U21s, Saracens U21s, London Irish U21s, ACT U21s, Bishop's Stortford and Upper Clapton.

He worked for sports hospitality company ICM, before co-founding start-up Epolitix.

In 2003, Lukies founded Monitise (then Mchex) with Steve Atkinson. They wanted to link banks and mobile operators, letting consumers manage their finances or make payments directly from their mobile. Prior to this, Lukies was a co-founder of epolitix.com. In June 2007 he led the company's demerger from Morse and listing on the LSE's AIM market.

In January 2014, Lukies was appointed as a Business Ambassador for the financial services industry by the British Government.

In June 2014, Lukies appointed Elizabeth Buse as his co-CEO.

In June 2014, Lukies was appointed a CBE for services to mobile banking and charity. In August 2014, he was appointed as Non-Executive Chairman of fintech industry body, Innovate Finance. In March 2015, Lukies stepped down as co-Chief Executive of Monitise after undertaking a strategic review of the company.

In January 2014, Alastair was appointed as a Business Ambassador to the Prime Minister for the financial services industry by the UK Government, and remained so until 2019 when he moved across to join the Prime Minister's Business Council.

In September 2015, Alastair was part of the founding team of Motive Partners, an investment firm based in London and New York focused on investing in and building the next generation of financial technology. Alastair remains the vice-chairman of the Global Advisory Council at Motive Partners, alongside John Thompson (chairman, Microsoft) and Larry Summers (Former Secretary of the US Treasury).

Alastair is Founder & CEO of Pollinate International. Pollinate was created in 2017 to turn the tide for the world's largest and most complex financial services institutions. Working with banks and their legacy platforms, Pollinate helps launch new services that reinvent the payments and financial services sector.

Alastair is Chair of the Fintech Alliance, a government backed multifaceted digital engagement platform launched in 2019 which aims to bring the global FinTech ecosystem together in one easily accessible digital marketplace.
