= Edward Crankshaw =

British writer and translator (1909–1984)

William Edward Crankshaw (3 January 1909 – 30 November 1984) was a British writer, author, translator and commentator; best known for his work on Soviet affairs and the Gestapo (Secret State Police) of Nazi Germany.

== Early life ==
William Edward Crankshaw was born in the suburban town of Woodford, Essex (now Woodford, London), on 3 January 1909 to Arthur Edward Crankshaw (1876–1965) and Amy Beatrice Crankshaw, nee Bishop (1879–1962). He had one sibling, a younger brother Geoffrey Crankshaw (1912–2009) a noted critic of English music. Edward Crankshaw was educated in the Nonconformist public school Bishop's Stortford College, Hertfordshire, England.

== Career ==
Crankshaw started working as a journalist for a few months at The Times. In the 1930s he lived in Vienna, Austria, teaching English and learning German. He witnessed Adolf Hitler's Austro-German union in 1938, and predicted the Second World War while living there.

In 1940 Crankshaw was contacted by the Secret Intelligence Service because of his knowledge of German. During World War II he served as a "Y" (Signals Intelligence) officer in the British Army. From 1941 to 1943 he was assigned to the British Military Mission in Moscow, where he served initially as an Army "Y" specialist and later as the accredited representative of the British "Y" services, rising to the rank of Lieutenant-Colonel. Following a breakdown in "Y" cooperation with the Soviet General Staff in December 1942, the British "Y" Board recalled Crankshaw to London in February 1943. In May he was assigned to Bletchley Park, where he served as a liaison officer on matters pertaining to Russia.

From 1947 to 1968 he worked for the British Sunday newspaper The Observer, specialising in Soviet affairs. He obtained a transcript of Soviet leader Nikita Khrushchev's secret denunciation of Stalin in 1956, a newspaper sensation. While a junior reporter, Crankshaw had been summoned by Guy Burgess of the Foreign Office to be criticised for being "too soft towards Russia"; after Burgess was unmasked as one of the Cambridge Five spies (for the Soviet Union), and fled to Moscow, Crankshaw met him there several times, though he did not report on Burgess for The Observer, and ended up liking the spy.

He wrote around forty books, mainly on Austrian and Russian subjects.

== Personal life ==
In 1931, Crankshaw married Clare Carr. They had no children.

Crankshaw died on 30 November 1984 in Hawkhurst, Kent. He was 75 years old.

== Works ==
=== Non-fiction ===
- Joseph Conrad: Some Aspects of the Art of the Novel (1938; second edition 1976)
- Vienna: The Image of a Culture in Decline (1938; reprinted in 1976)
- Russia and Britain (1944)
- Russia and the Russians (1947)
- Russia by Daylight; US edition: Cracks in the Kremlin Wall (1951)
- The Forsaken Idea: A Study of Viscount Milner (1952)
- Gestapo: Instrument of Tyranny (1956)
- Russia Without Stalin (1956)
- Khrushchev's Russia (1959; revised 1962)
- The New Cold War: Moscow v. Pekin (1963)
- The Fall of the House of Habsburg (1963)
- Khrushchev. A Biography; US edition: Khrushchev. A Career (1966)
- Maria Theresa (1969)
- Khrushchev Remembers; introduction, commentary & notes (1970)
- The Habsburgs: Portrait of a Dynasty (1971)
- Tolstoy: The Making of a Novelist (1974)
- The Shadow of the Winter Palace: The Drift to Revolution, 1825-1917 (1976)
- Bismarck (1981)
- Putting Up With the Russians 1947-1984 (1984)

=== Fiction ===
- Nina Lessing (1938)
- What Glory? (1940)
- The Creedy Case (1954)
