= George W. Crane =

American journalist

George Washington Crane III
- Born: George Washington Crane; 28 April 1901; Wisconsin
- Died: 17 July 1995 (aged 94)
- Occupations: Psychologist; Physician

George Washington Crane III (April 28, 1901 – July 17, 1995) was an American psychologist and physician, best known as a conservative syndicated newspaper columnist (Worry Clinic, Test Your Horse Sense) for 60 years (he had previously written campaign speeches for Calvin Coolidge), and published at least three books. He was the father of Republican U.S. congressmen Phil and Dan Crane.

== Biography ==
He was born on April 28, 1901, in Chicago, Illinois.

He wrote two stories in the first year of the magazine Weird Tales.

In the 1930s, Crane developed and distributed many pamphlets concerning life, emotional health and marriage. One of them, "Tests for Husbands and Wives," remains a topic of discussion even into the 21st century. This pamphlet contained evaluation charts for both husbands and wives, who could score themselves and others according to a 100-point scale. The tests were composite opinions of 600 husbands and wives, and included their most frequently voiced flaws and virtues. Crane summarized these opinions, and allocated points that reflected his "judgement as a psychologist and physician." While many of the evaluations reflect lifestyles of the day, taking points off for wives with crooked stocking seams or wearing red nail polish, the pamphlet advocated a degree of sexual equality; the only twenty-pointer in the test was for the husband: "Ardent lover - sees his wife has orgasm in marital congress."

In 1957, he founded the Scientific Marriage Foundation, which claimed to have arranged over 5,000 marriages. Applicants would fill out forms, provide character references and photographs, and interview a local counselor of the foundation, who would provide an assessment of the candidate. The information was sent to the foundation in Mellott, Indiana, which would process the data with an IBM sorting machine, and pair up men and women according to their expected compatibility. Advised by religious leaders of the day, such as Rev. Norman Vincent Peale, Rabbi George Fox and Methodist Bishop Gerald Kennedy, it was one of the first computer dating organizations. Crane's Foundation predated the pioneering Operation Match computer dating system by several years.

His articles consistently emphasized the use of logic in approaching life and solving problems. However, the logic presented in his columns was often unorthodox. As an example, in an article entitled,"Why Men are Superior to Women," Crane offered the argument in support of his thesis, "How many women have you heard about, [sic] who were shepherds?" In another article, he described homosexuality as an "abnormal erotic state" that required "strong incentive plus enough time for the heterosexual habit to develop."

One of Crane's long-standing philosophies theorised that the reason for marital conflict was a lack of sufficient quantities of "boudoir cheesecake," i.e., connubial bliss.

He wrote a psychology textbook entitled "Psychology Applied" which was in print from 1932 to 1967.

Crane also wrote two syndicated quiz columns, including "Professor Fax," which appeared in the Chicago Tribune, among other newspapers.

== Death ==
He died on July 17, 1995, at his farm outside Hillsboro, Indiana.
