= John Richard Patterson =

British businessman (1945–1997)

John Richard Patterson (17 May 1945 – 29 January 1997) was the founder of the UK-based computer dating service Dateline. The Guardian called him "history's most successful Cupid," while The Times characterized Dateline as "probably the largest, longest established and most successful computer dating service in the world."

== Biography ==
Patterson was born in Hertfordshire and educated at Bishop's Stortford College. The son of a banker, he earned a degree in mechanical engineering from the University of London in 1966. He founded Dateline in 1966 after a trip to Harvard University, where he had seen a computer used to match partners at a freshman's ball. The company was founded with £50.00, which he had borrowed from his parents, and later used an IBM computer.

The company was highly successful, eventually becoming "the world's biggest and most enduring introduction service" in the 1980s and 1990s. However, Patterson struggled to find clients at first, and engaged in shady business practices: he was convicted of fraud in 1969 for selling lists of women who signed up for his dating service to men who were looking for prostitutes. Dateline relied heavily on advertising, taking out the first full-page ads for a dating service in newspaper and magazines during the early 1970s, and becoming known for its catchphrase, "You too can find love." In 1974, Patterson bought out and absorbed Com-Pat, his only major competitor and the first computer dating service in the UK, started in 1964 by Joan Ball. Patterson also published a monthly magazine titled Singles, and in 1975 he launched a travel agency, Singles Holidays. While these ventures eventually folded, Dateline continued to operate throughout the 1970s, 1980s, and 1990s. During the 1990s, some estimates suggested that the company matched more than 40,000 prospective couples a year, approximately 2,000 of whom ended up getting married.

Patterson was an avid aviator, purchasing his first plane in 1972, and winning The Sunday Times' Beaujolais Wine Race two years running in his single seater light aircraft.

Patterson was married to Sandy Nye (also known as Valerie); the couple had three children before divorcing in 1982. He subsequently had two more children with his former secretary, Kim Sellick. He struggled with alcoholism later in life, and died of a heart attack in 1997.

After Patterson's death, Dateline was sold to the Columbus Publishing Group in 1998, for £1.45 million.
