= Phil Crane =

American politician (1930–2014)

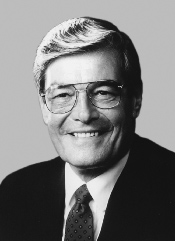

Chair of the Republican Study Committee
- In office 1983–1989
- Preceded by: Dick Schulze
- Succeeded by: Tom DeLay

Member of the U.S. House of Representatives from Illinois
- In office November 25, 1969 – January 3, 2005
- Preceded by: Donald Rumsfeld
- Succeeded by: Melissa Bean
- Constituency: 13th district (1969–1973); 12th district (1973–1993); 8th district (1993–2005)

Personal details
- Born: Philip Miller Crane; November 3, 1930 Chicago, Illinois, U.S.
- Died: November 8, 2014 (aged 84) Jefferson, Maryland, U.S.
- Party: Republican
- Spouse: Arlene Johnson
- Children: 7
- Relatives: George W. Crane (father); Dan Crane (brother)
- Education: DePauw University (attended); University of Michigan, Ann Arbor (attended); Hillsdale College (BA); Indiana University, Bloomington (MA, PhD)
- Crane's voice Crane on granting Most Favored Nation status to Cambodia. Recorded July 10, 1995

Philip Miller Crane (November 3, 1930 – November 8, 2014) was an American politician. He was a Republican member of the United States House of Representatives from 1969 to 2005, representing the 8th district of Illinois in the northwestern suburbs of Chicago. At the time of his defeat in the 2004 election, Crane was the longest-serving Republican member of the House.

== Early life ==
Crane was born in Chicago, Illinois, the son of Cora Ellen (née Miller) and George Washington Crane III, a physician and college professor.

He was educated at Hillsdale College, the University of Vienna, and Indiana University Bloomington, where he received a PhD in history in 1961. Crane served in the United States Army. He also attended DePauw University and the University of Michigan.

Crane was a faculty member at Indiana University Bloomington and at Bradley University in Peoria, a staff member for the Republican National Committee and a director of research for the 1964 Republican presidential candidate Barry Goldwater. His brother Dan Crane served alongside him as the Congressman from another Illinois district for three terms. Another brother, David Crane, ran for Congress from Indiana a few times simultaneously with Phil and Dan. The brothers were dubbed "the Kennedys of the Right". However, David never won a seat in Congress, and Dan ended up being defeated for re-election in 1984 due, in part, to his having sexual relations with a 17-year-old girl. Phil began to battle alcoholism, which he publicly acknowledged after winning reelection in 2000.

== Political career ==
Crane was first elected to the United States Congress in what was then the 13th District in a 1969 special election, succeeding Donald Rumsfeld, who was appointed to a position in the Nixon administration. Crane was a dark horse candidate in a field of seven aspirants for the Republican nomination, and was by far the most conservative candidate in the field. Despite the opposition of the Chicago North Shore GOP monied establishment, he prevailed, though by only 2,100 votes. He then won the special election with 58 percent of the vote.

He soon established himself as one of the House's most conservative members, leading a small but growing cluster of right-wing congressmen who had cut their teeth in the fledgling conservative intellectual movement of the early 1960s and drew their inspiration from Goldwater's presidential campaign. He was handily elected to a full term in 1970, and was reelected 16 times. His district number changed as Illinois lost congressional seats—from the 13th (1969–1973) to the 12th (1973–1993) to the 8th (1993–2005). His district was long considered the most Republican district in the Chicago area, if not in all of Illinois. He almost always won with 70 percent or more of the vote until the 1990s, when he had to fend off more moderate Republicans in the primary and better-funded Democrats in the general election.

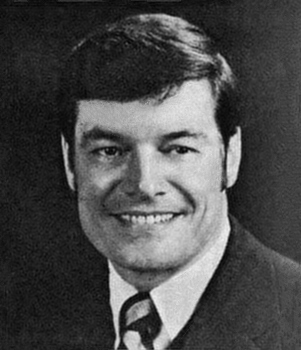
Rep. Phil Crane early in his congressional tenure

Soon after being elected to his first full term in 1970, he was tapped by several conservative activists, including Paul Weyrich, to form a group of conservative congressmen to keep watch on the Republican leadership, which at the time was seen as too moderate. This new group was known as the Republican Study Committee. He remained a member of the group for the remainder of his time in Congress.

In 1970, Crane visited the South Vietnamese prison at Côn Sơn Island, and stated that the "tiger cages" were "cleaner than the average Vietnamese home."

In 1974, Crane helped initiate the only public and filmed audit of the United States Bullion Depository at Fort Knox in Kentucky. This experience was shared by 12 congressmen and 100 journalists, and hosted by Mary Brooks, then director of the United States Mint.

In 1976, he was appointed Chairman of the Illinois Citizens for Reagan, in which capacity he made numerous speaking engagements throughout the midwest on behalf of the conservative California governor's unsuccessful GOP primary bid for the Presidential nomination.

From 1977 to 1979, Crane was the chairman of the American Conservative Union (ACU), a Washington, D.C.–based conservative citizens' lobby and political action group. During his tenure the group waged a nationwide campaign against President Jimmy Carter's proposed cession of the Panama Canal and against the proposed SALT II arms limitation treaty with the USSR. As a result of these efforts, the organization's budget, staff and presence in Washington greatly increased.

=== 1980 presidential campaign ===
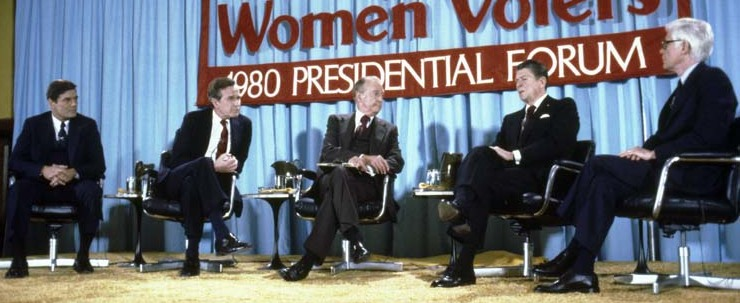
Eric Sevareid (center) moderates a League of Women Voters-sponsored presidential forum on March 13, 1980, in Chicago featuring Crane (far left) and fellow Republican candidates George H. W. Bush (second from left), John B. Anderson (far right), and Ronald Reagan (second from right).

In 1978, shortly before the midterm election, Crane announced that he would be a candidate for the Republican nomination for president in 1980. This surprised many observers, as Crane had supported Ronald Reagan for president two years earlier. At the time of his announcement, Crane expressed doubts that Reagan would run again (after two failed attempts for the nomination in 1968 and 1976), and intimated that, should Reagan run, he would likely drop out. However, Crane did stay in the race after Reagan's entry. Ultimately, however, Crane was one of the early candidates to drop out of the race during the Republican primaries.

=== Political eclipse ===
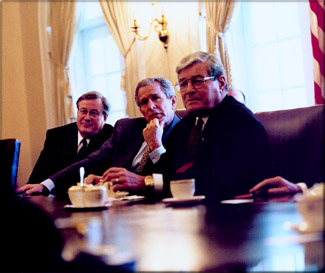
Phil Crane with Ways and Means Committee chairman Bill Thomas and President George W. Bush at the White House.

After the 1980 campaign, Crane's influence rapidly declined. Newt Gingrich, who had been elected to Congress soon after Crane announced his candidacy for president, soon surpassed him as the leading conservative firebrand in the House. By the time the Republicans took control of the House in 1994, Crane was widely seen as a "foot soldier" for Republican causes.

Crane did have some influence as a member of the House Ways and Means Committee, which handles tax issues. As chairman of its trade subcommittee, he was effective in his efforts to promote his staunch free trade views. When the full committee's chairman, Bill Archer of Texas, retired after the 2000 elections, Crane made a bid for the highly coveted post of Ways and Means chairman. He was the committee's most senior member, having been on the panel since 1975. However, he was passed over in favor of Bill Thomas of California for the Chairman's job. Some believe that Crane was not chosen because prior to the vote he had admitted to being an alcoholic and sought a leave from the House to get treatment. Others believe that Thomas's ability to raise money for congressional candidates helped him win the chairmanship. Crane did earn the vice-chairmanship of the powerful committee.

Crane is also noted for the role he played in ending the chewing gum ban in Singapore, as part of negotiations during the US-Singapore Free Trade Agreement.

=== Political defeat ===
In 2002, Crane's Democratic opponent, business consultant Melissa Bean, accused Crane of being out of touch with his constituents. Indeed, even some Republican voters claimed they had not seen him in decades. He was one of the few congressmen whose Washington office lacked a public email address. Despite being dramatically outspent (she received almost no funding from the national party), Bean surprised both parties by garnering 43 percent of the vote. It was only the second time that Crane had been held below 60 percent of the vote.

Bean sought a rematch in the 2004 election. Crane's lack of enthusiasm, perceptions that he was on the verge of retirement, combined with Bean's stance as a moderate Democrat by Chicago-area Democratic standards, placed what had long been a very safe Republican seat in jeopardy. Bean raised almost as much money as Crane, mainly from small donors. In contrast, Crane received most of his donations from political action committees. Despite Republican efforts to help Crane, Bean defeated him by roughly four percentage points even as George W. Bush carried the district in the 2004 election by 12 percentage points. Coinciding with the growing Democratic trend in the Chicago suburbs, the 8th has been in Democratic hands for all but one term since.

The Almanac of American Politics described Crane as "an unusually bitter loser, refusing to speak to Bean or to arrange for the usually routine post-election transfer of district cases and other office files."

== Death ==
Crane died of lung cancer at the home of his daughter, Rebekah, in Jefferson, Maryland, on November 8, 2014, five days after his 84th birthday.

== In popular culture ==
Crane is portrayed by actor James Marsden in the 2020 television miniseries Mrs. America, which aired on the Hulu Network.

U.S. House of Representatives
Preceded by Donald Rumsfeld	Member of the U.S. House of Representatives from Illinois's 13th congressional district 1969–1973	Succeeded by Robert McClory
Preceded by Robert McClory	Member of the U.S. House of Representatives from Illinois's 12th congressional district 1973–1993	Succeeded by Jerry Costello
Preceded by Dan Rostenkowski	Member of the U.S. House of Representatives from Illinois's 8th congressional district 1993–2005	Succeeded by Melissa Bean
Party political offices
Preceded by Dick Schulze	Chair of the Republican Study Committee; 1983–1989	Succeeded by Tom DeLay
