= SALT (dating app) =

Christian dating app

SALT is a Christian dating app designed to facilitate connections among Christians seeking relationships. The app is designed specifically for Christians. First launched in the United Kingdom, the app has several million users in 50 countries.

== Media coverage ==
In February 2019, BBC Songs of Praise featured a Christian speed dating event, which was organised by SALT.
