= Cheekd =

Dating app based in New York City

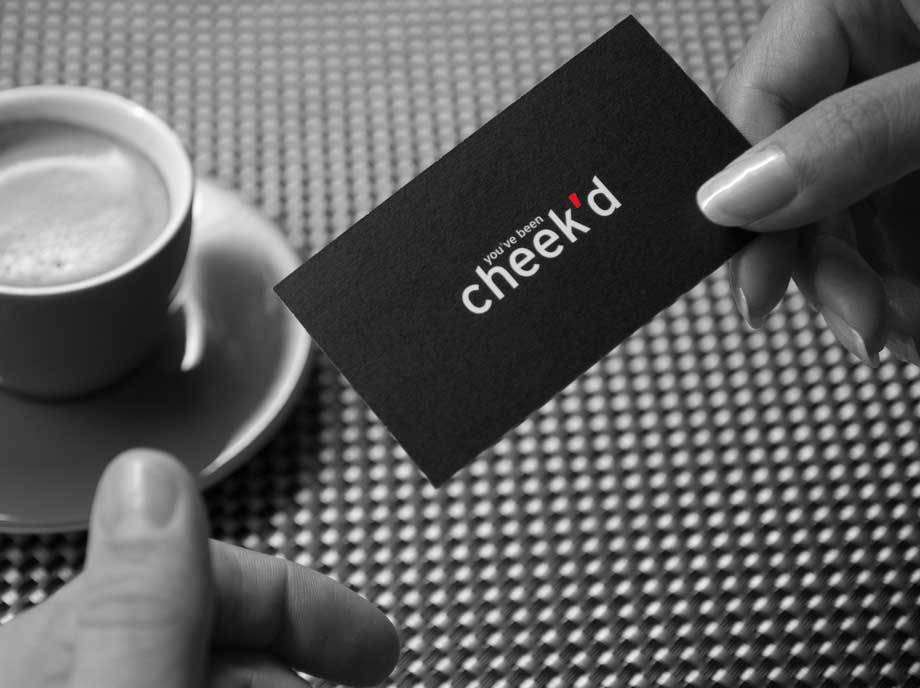
Cheekd card

Cheekd is a dating app based in New York City. It was founded in 2010 by Lori Cheek.

== History ==
The service debuted with the name "Cheek'd". Founder Lori Cheek appeared on the television program, Shark Tank in February 2014, but did not succeed in obtaining funding from any of the five judges. She said Cheek’d only had 1000 subscribers at that time.

=== Business card model ===
Cheek'd offered two plans, paid and free. For $25, subscribers got a set of 50 business cards that could be given out once someone caught their eye. Each card had a phrase, an online code, and a URL to the subscriber's account. Recipients could look up the giver's profile. In addition to purchasing cards, there was a $9.95 monthly membership fee.

=== Smartphone app ===
In 2015, the service's name changed from "Cheek'd" to "Cheekd". The new app used Bluetooth technology to alert users whenever a compatible user was within a 30-foot radius, instead of using cards.

== Patent lawsuit ==
The original business card-based model for Cheekd had been claimed as a patented process by Lori Cheek, as U.S. patent 8,543,465. In September 2017, a complaint was filed, alleging that the idea was not original to Lori Cheek.

Cheek responded, stating that the complaint was baseless, and a complete fabrication. The lawsuit Pirri v. Cheek was dismissed in a pre-trial conference in New York's Federal Court on April 5, 2018.
