= Dating preferences =

Preferences in romantic partners

Dating preferences refers to the preferences that individuals have towards a potential partner when approaching the formation of a romantic relationship. This concept is related to mate choice in humans, the research literature there primarily discusses the preference for traits that are evolutionarily desirable, such as physical symmetry, waist-to-chest ratio, and waist-to-hip ratio. Dating preferences differ in that there are often social mechanisms that explain phenomena, rather than strictly evolutionary.

== Research ==
=== Ideal preferences debate ===
Recent research has found that people seek romantic partners who exhibit their ideal preferences. Shared musical taste and personality traits have been strongly linked to bonding between romantic partners. Though this research is not specifically related to romantic relationships, it provides further evidence of the link between preferences and relationships.

However, other authors have found that the preferences people report on the dimensions of physical attractiveness, earning prospects, and personability do not align with the characteristics of the people they genuinely seek when forming new relationships. Yet they were unable to identify a mechanism to explain their findings. In another study of theirs, it was found that if there was a difference between ideal preferences and potential partner traits in face-to-face meeting contexts, it did not predict worse relationship satisfaction than contexts where ideal preferences and potential partner traits align. In a response to these contradictory findings, a meta-analysis found that less than 5% of the studies used by these authors focused on the link between ideal preferences and initial relationship formation, while the remaining majority of studies evaluate general attraction and processes later in people's relationships. This casts doubt on the contradictory findings.

=== Race ===
Among heterosexual men on dating apps, East Asian women are consistently ranked as the most desired women for dating. Recent research has found that Asian women are considered more desirable than white women because Asian women's physical features are perceived as more feminine, and therefore more attractive. Black women and men are ranked as the least desired in dating. This has led some online dating websites to change their algorithms to focus less on individual appearances and demographics, and more on individual hobbies and mutual interests.

In the United States, White men have higher sexual capital than White women, allowing them to have access to more choices in dating than white women. This phenomenon has been referred to as the "gendered white advantage" in dating. It is observed that heterosexual Asian women (as well as homosexual Asian men) have a preference for White men as romantic partners, this same preference is not found among homosexual Asian women, who tend to prefer Asian partners. This is attributed to the fact that, for men, status is the most important factor in dating, while for women, it is physical attractiveness.

In a 2009 study, a small subset of white female online daters were found to exclusively prefer only black men. White women were found to be 7 times more likely than white men to have an exclusive preference for blacks, while they were 11 times more likely than white men to reject Asians as partners. White women who described their body type as "thick, voluptuous, a few extra pounds, or large" were more likely to prefer only black men, and white women with slimmer body types were 7 times more likely to exclude them. White women with a height preference were more likely to exclude Asian men and over 8 times as likely to prefer only black men, possibly suggesting that black men are desired because they are perceived as possessing more physically masculine traits such as a tall stature. The authors suggested that men may be more likely to prefer Asian women due to stereotypes that they embody "perfect womanhood and exotic femininity". Followup studies by Feliciano, et al. have largely replicated these results.

In a 2012 study where 20 women were polled, black men were shown to be perceived as more attractive than White or East Asian males. In dating apps, however, white female online daters, as well as other female online daters from other races, generally possess a preference for white men.

Race plays a significant role in selecting a dating partner. A recent study found that 88.7% of participants had been in an interracial relationship, but preferences varied by race and gender, with White women having the strongest ingroup dating preference among the races, and a stronger preference for Hispanics over Asian dating partners.

This concept of similarity hypothesis arises in a study concerning attraction to people whose race is that of their opposite-sex parent in biracial individuals, a hypothesis that comes from psychoanalytic theory. The study found that relationships for biracial individuals did not support the psychoanalytic perspective of attraction, but there was a significant preference for individuals whose race matched at least one of their parents, providing support for the similarity hypothesis. Additionally, preference for individuals whose ethnicity matched their parents was weaker for those with a diverse dating background, demonstrating that same-race preference may be a matter of experience rather than intrinsic preference. Factors that influence the likelihood of preference for dating members of other races have been investigated, particularly social approval, social identity, and previous experience. Social approval refers to the perceived attitudes towards out-group dating of support networks, especially friends, family, and community, which was found to positively predict the formation of outgroup romantic relationships. Social identity refers to an individual's sense of belongingness, and a security in that identity, which was found to decrease the likelihood of dating other races. Previous experience, which included personal experience and experiences of people close to the individual, contributed to more open-minded attitudes toward other races, and increased the likelihood of dating members of other races. At this time, the mechanisms to explain why these phenomena exist has not been clearly defined by researchers. Therefore, the reasons explaining the phenomena are merely speculative based on relatedness to existing theories that govern social interactions.

==== Asian-American preferences ====
Various studies have specifically evaluated the implications of racial dating preferences among Asian-American individuals. In a study investigating the dating preference tendencies of Asian-American high school students, it was found that among the students, strength of one's own racial identity as well as closeness with family negatively predicted a preference for dating members of other races. In addition, the study found that a perception of racial discrimination against Asian-Americans predicted that individuals would prefer dating members of different races. In a study on the dating preferences of queer Asian American men, the dimension of internalized racism was evaluated in its role in racial preferences for these individuals. Among queer Asian men, internalized racism was positively associated with an exclusive preference for dating White men. They also found that self-efficacy contributed to greater preference for same-race dating, paralleling the findings of the aforementioned study.

=== Weight ===
Weight bias, or the social stigma of obesity describes the collection of negative attitudes towards individuals who are overweight, whose implications on dating has been found in research. In a study on dating and hiring preferences on the basis of weight, around 1000 participants across were asked to report on their preference of individuals after being shown pictures of thinner and heavier individuals. The sexual preference of participants ranged from lesbian women, gay men, bisexual women, heterosexual men, and heterosexual women. This study found that there was a significant relationship between weight and dating preference, which varied across sexual preference. The bias towards thinner partners was found to be strongest for heterosexual participants and gay men, and weakest for lesbian and bisexual women. These findings demonstrate that although weight bias impacts heterosexual individuals and gay men, this effect does not appear among sexual minority women.

=== Wanting/having children ===
The desire to have children, as well as already having children, impacts dating preference among individuals. Research has particularly found the impact that having and wanting children has on men's preferences for potential dating partners. In a study on the impact of having or wanting children in the online dating scene, wanting and having children was found to have an impact on men's preferences for potential woman partners. Men who did not have children, or those who wanted them had a preference for younger women to a significantly greater extent than men who had children or did not want them. Generally, the study found that whether or not a men had or did not have children had more of an impact than whether they wanted to didn't want children. Furthermore, in a study on the impact of having children in lesbian woman dating preferences, it was found that the exclusion of potential partners with children was dependent on race. Based on a combination of factors, including having children, excluding women with children, and others, White women were found to be the most exclusionary of potential partners with children, followed by Hispanic, followed by Black, followed by Asian.

=== Psychological abuse ===
Research related to dating preferences for those who have encountered psychologically abusive relationships has demonstrated that negative experiences in relationships can cause people to prefer traits in individuals that are harmful to themselves, which can also be found in research on the Dark Triad of personality. Additionally, it has been shown that even when people leave relationships that are harmful for them, they will find themselves in future relationships that are equally as harmful. In a study on psychological abuse and preferences for potential partners, it was found that women who have been the recipient of psychological abuse in a previous relationship are more likely to seek romantic relationships in which their partner exhibits characteristics of one who is psychologically abusive, such as impulsiveness and jealousy. Another finding from the study was related to the partner pursuits of perpetrators of psychological abuse, where for men who have psychologically abused a recent romantic partner, they prefer seeking romantic relationships with anxiously attached women, who are more likely to be victims of psychological abuse.
