= Journal of Creative Communications =

Journal of Creative Communications (JOCC)
- Discipline: Communication & Media Studies | Marketing Communications
- Language: English
- Edited by: Manisha Pathak-Shelat

Publication details
- History: March 2006–present
- Publisher: Sage Publications India Pvt. Ltd.
- Frequency: Triannually
- Impact factor: 1.5 (2018)

Standard abbreviations
- ISO 4: J. Creat. Commun.

Indexing
- ISSN: 0973-2586 (print); 0973-2594 (web)

Links
- Journal homepage; Online access; Online archive

The Journal of Creative Communications is published three times a year by SAGE Publications (New Delhi, India) in collaboration with MICA, Shela, Ahmedabad, India. It is an international double-blind peer-reviewed journal.

JOCC is a journal in the field of communication theory and practice. It describes itself as a journal that 'promotes inquiry into contemporary communication issues within wider social, economic, cultural, technological and management contexts, and provides a forum for the discussion of theoretical and practical insights emerging from such inquiry.'

This journal is a member of the Committee on Publication Ethics (COPE). JOCC is currently edited by Dr Manisha Pathak-Shelat, MICA.

== Abstracting and indexing ==
The Journal of Creative Communications is abstracted and indexed in:

- Emerging Sources Citation Index
- DeepDyve
- Dutch-KB
- Portico
- EBSCO
- Indian Citation Index
- J-Gate
- OCLC
- Ohio
- SCOPUS
- University Grants Commission (India)
- Clarivate Analytics: Emerging Sources Citation Index (ESCI)
- CABELLS Journalytics
- ProQuest: IBSS
- ProQuest: Social Science Premium Collection

== News ==
Research and case studies published by JOCC have appeared across multiple new sites. The paper 'Materiality and Discursivity of Cyber Violence Against Women in India' by Sahana Sarkar and Benson Rajan was cited in various articles., outlining the online abuse faced by women in India. The paper titled 'The Twitter Revolution in the Gulf Countries' by Badreya Al-Jenaibi was cited by an article in The Washington Post.

== Editor ==
- Dr Manisha Pathak Shelat - MICA (institute)

== Associate Editors ==
- Kallol Das – MICA (institute)
- Kjerstin Thorson – Michigan State University
- Rajat Roy – Bond University
