= Monilink =

Banking service that operated in the United Kingdom

- Type: Limited company
- Industry: Banking/telecoms
- Founded: 2003
- Area served: United Kingdom
- Number of employees: unknown
- Website: www.monilink.co.uk

Monilink Limited (stylized MONILINK) was the banking service operating in the United Kingdom that gave customers access to their financial information directly from their mobile phones. Created in 2003 Monilink was a joint venture between Monitise and LINK. Promotional material promised consumers that, through the service: “The future of banking is in your hands”.

Latterly, Monilink offered customers the chance to check their bank balance in real-time, view a mini statement detailing the last six transactions and add credit to up to five pay as you go phones. Future services would include options to move money between accounts, pay bills, and purchase travel tickets.

The company became inactive around 2011 and was dissolved in 2015.

== Banking partners ==
By June 2008, HSBC, First Direct, Alliance & Leicester, NatWest, Royal Bank of Scotland, Ulster Bank and Lloyds TSB. Alliance & Leicester withdrew, after being taken over by Santander.

== Network partners ==
All the mobile phone companies in the UK enable Monilink: Vodafone, O2, Orange, T-Mobile and 3. Tesco Mobile and Virgin Mobile are also participating.

== Awards ==
MONILINK was recognised by the World Economic Forum in 2006 as a technology pioneer in the area of mobile banking.

== UK mobile phone companies ==
- T-Mobile UK
- Vodafone UK
- O2
- Orange UK

== Mobile virtual network operators ==
- BT Mobile
- Dot Mobile
- Fresh Mobile
- TalkTalk Group
- Tesco Mobile
- Virgin Mobile
