= First Direct =

UK bank

HSBC UK Bank plc trading as First Direct

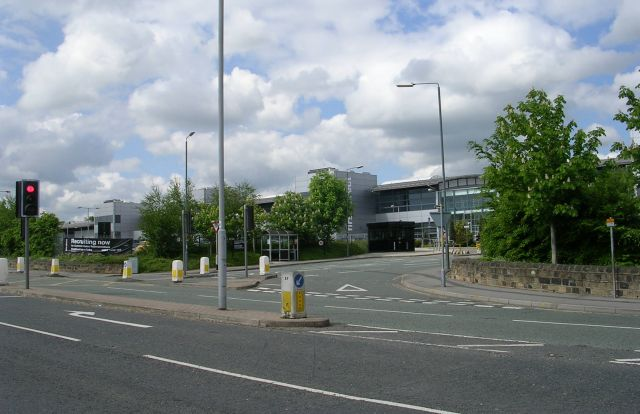
- First Direct headquarters in Stourton, Leeds.
- Type: Division of HSBC UK Bank plc
- Industry: Banking
- Founded: October 1989
- Headquarters: Leeds, England, UK
- Products: Credit cards; Loans; Savings; Mortgage loans; Stockbroking
- Parent: HSBC UK Bank plc
- Website: www.firstdirect.com

First Direct (styled first direct) is a telephone and internet based direct retail bank, which is a division of HSBC UK Bank plc based in the United Kingdom. First Direct has headquarters in Leeds, England, and in 2024, had 1.9 million customers. On its launch, it was the UK's first telephone-only bank.

== History ==
First Direct was formed on 1 October 1989 by Midland Bank, one of the 'big four' banks in the United Kingdom. First Direct took its first call on 12:01 am on 1 October 1989; more than 1,000 calls were taken within the first twenty four hours. The launch of First Direct in 1989 was advertised twofold. Firstly, there was an advert for Audi which was interrupted by a broadcast purportedly back in time from 2010, celebrating the 21st anniversary of the company (the interruption was agreed with Audi beforehand). Secondly, there were two different adverts running concurrently on ITV and Channel 4, one offering a negative view showing the aspects of normal banking (with a blues song mimed by Steve Punt) and the other a positive view of First Direct (with a gospel song mimed by Jeremy Swift), with the two crossing over at a key point.

By May 1991, the bank had 100,000 customers. In June 1992, it became a part of HSBC, when HSBC acquired Midland Bank. In December 1993, the company entered operating profit for the first time and achieved break-even in December 1994. In April 1995, the bank gained its 500,000th customer and in January 1997, the company had over one million customers following a take over of Forward Trust Personal Finance.

In May 1999, it launched text message (SMS) banking, a service through which the bank alerts customers by SMS if the balance on their current account goes below a certain amount, and, if set, will send weekly mini statements also by SMS.

=== 21st century ===
The bank launched internet banking services fully in August 2000.

In July 2001, the bank's Offset Mortgage was launched. In January 2004, the bank launched First Directory, a service whereby additional services were added to current accounts such as free text message banking, annual travel insurance and mobile phone insurance for a fixed monthly charge.

In April 2004, the bank launched Internet Banking Plus, a service whereby account information was taken by third party internet banking from the bank's other accounts with different banks and the information was unified under First Direct's Internet Banking Plus service.

In October 2006, the bank launched a first generation mobile phone banking service in partnership with Monilink, pre dating mobile apps. In February 2007, First Direct became the first bank in the United Kingdom to introduce a fee for current accounts, fuelling concern for the future of fee free banking in the country for personal customers.

In September 2016, First Direct introduced voice ID technology to verify customers' identities when calling into the bank, the first bank in the United Kingdom to introduce the technology on such a large scale. In 2016, the company was voted the best bank for customer service by MoneySavingExpert.com.

In 2017, First Direct introduced new native mobile app, for both Apple and Android platforms.

In July 2018, First Direct transferred from being a division of HSBC Bank plc to a division of HSBC UK Bank plc, as part of the bank's ringfencing restructure.

In February 2020, it came first in the Competition and Markets Authority bi-annual survey for overall service quality.

In September 2025, the bank ceased issuing paper statements for savings accounts, requiring customers to access them digitally via the app or online.

== First Direct Bank Arena ==
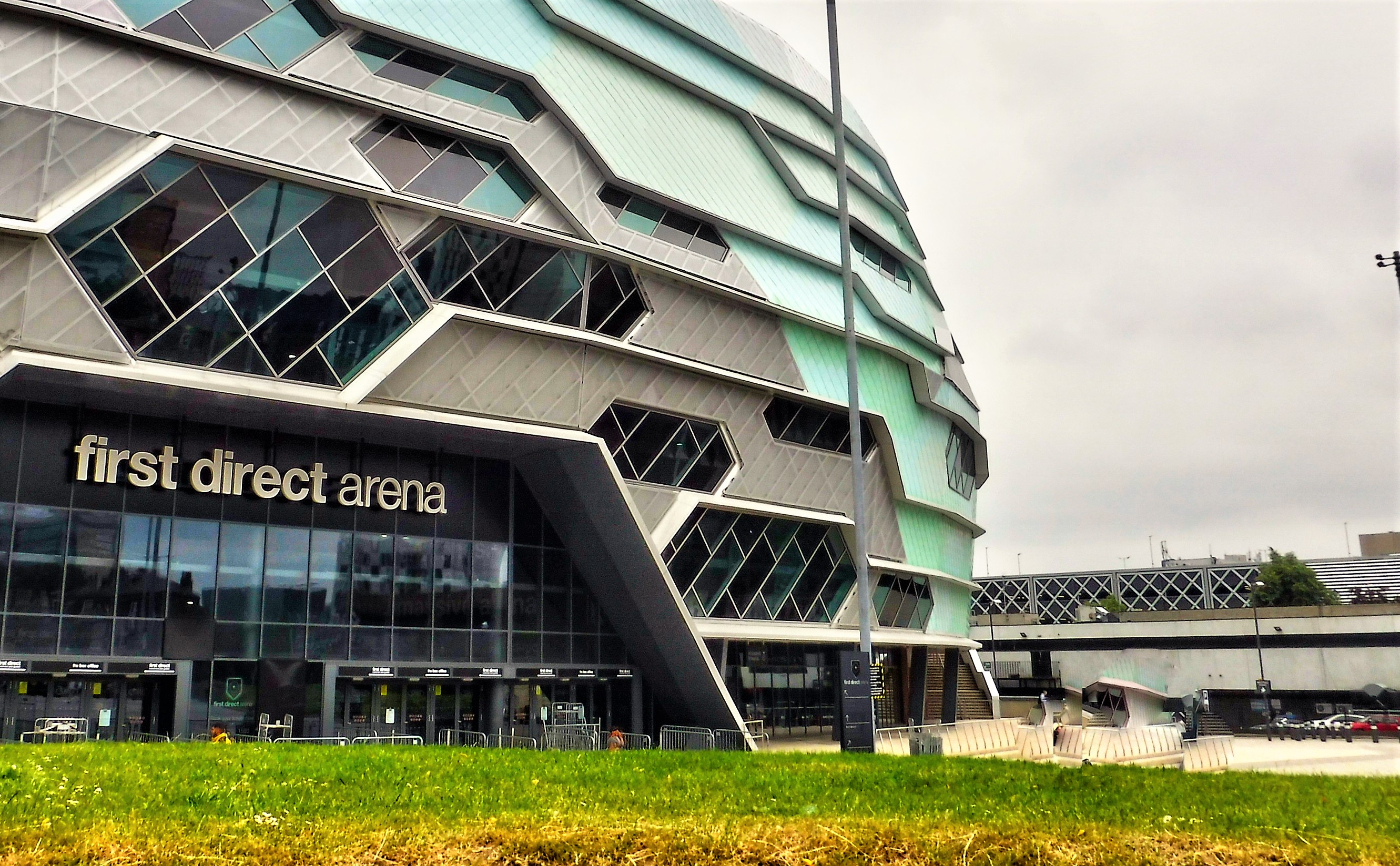
The bank sponsors the First Direct Arena.

In May 2013, First Direct secured naming rights until 2018 for the new Leeds Arena, to be known as the First Direct Arena. In March 2017, it was announced that First Direct had extended its naming sponsorship of Leeds arena for a further five years.

In 2022, the naming was extended and the arena renamed the First Direct Bank Arena in 2025.
