= Hily =

Online dating application

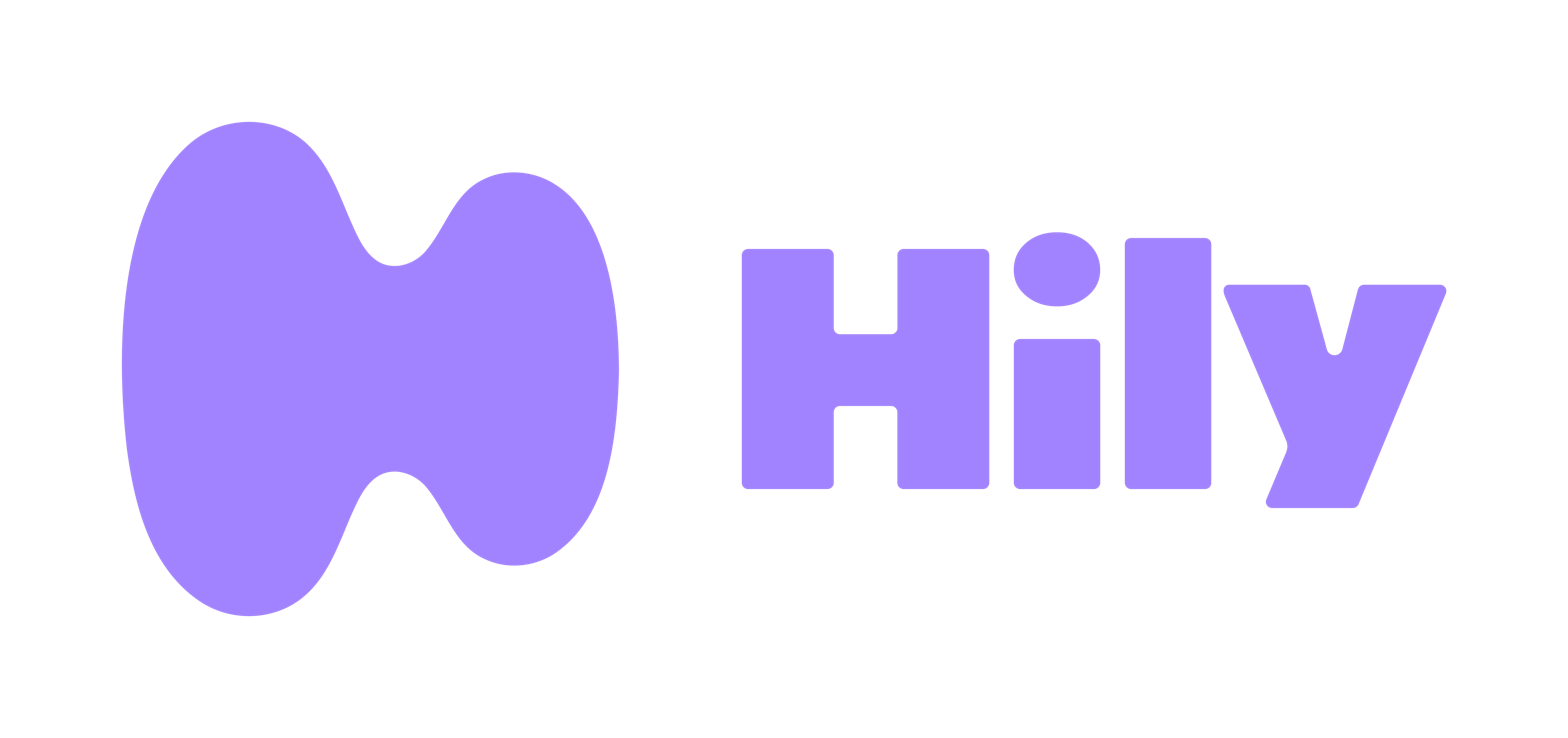
- Release: August 14, 2017; 9 years ago
- Stable release: 4.0 / August 2, 2019; 7 years ago
- Operating system: iOS, Android
- Available in: English, Spanish, French, German, Italian, Portuguese, and Dutch
- Website: hily.com

Hily is an online dating application that matches users by analyzing users' backgrounds, interests, and app activity. The name Hily is an acronym for "Hey, I Like You."

== History ==
Hily was founded by Alex Pasykov, alongside co-founders Dmytro Kononov and Jake Vygnan. The concept came from Pronin's background in analytics and statistical modeling. It is designed to connect prospective partners based on interests, instead of geographic location and physical attractiveness.

Hily was initially released in August 2017. By October 2017, the app had 35,000 users during its closed beta stage. Hily later acquired additional users through a partnership with Snapchat. Later, it expanded to the United Kingdom, Ireland, France, Japan, and Mexico.

By August 2019, Hily had more than 5 million active users.

== Platform ==
Hily employs statistical algorithms to analyze data such as depth of dialogue, word choice, and mutual likes to identify profiles with a high probability for a match. Its "risk score" evaluates user profiles, using criteria such as verification status, user complaints, and other activity metrics instead of an "attractiveness score."

Hily requires account verification to confirm authenticity, using methods such as live photo capture, official ID uploads, or social media integration. It employs real-time image verification for new accounts, and its matching algorithm improves as user engagement increases. The app's registration options for gender include male, female, and non-binary.

In 2020, Hily introduced compatibility checks and video calls. The app also provides suggested icebreakers to facilitate initial interactions.
