= Operation Match =

First computer dating service in the United States

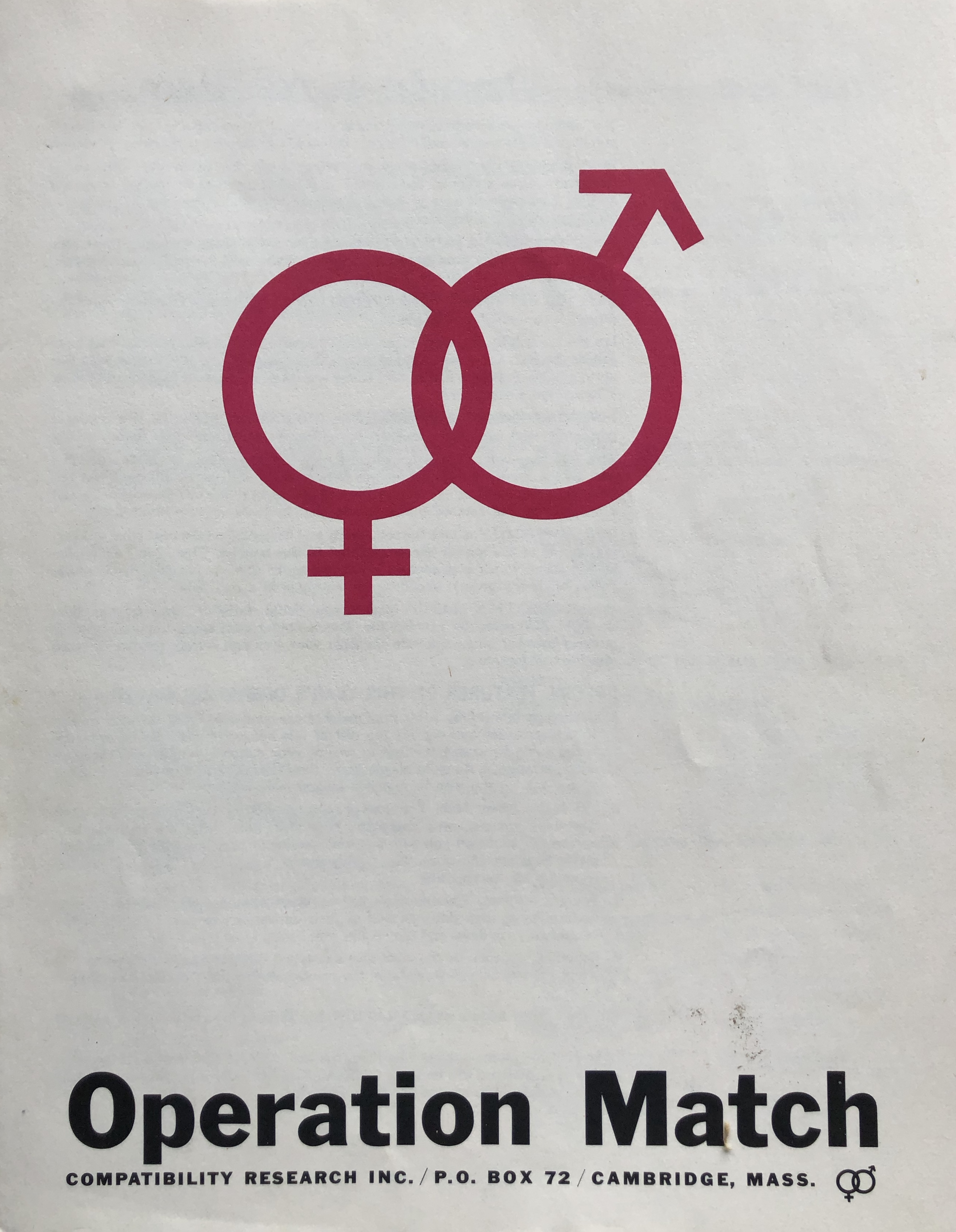
Operation Match questionnaire

Operation Match was a computer dating service created in 1965 by three Harvard undergraduates and Douglas H. Ginsburg, a Cornell dropout who later became a Supreme Court nominee. It was among the first ever computer matchmakers in the US, and was inspired by Joan Ball's St. James Computer Dating Service (later Com-Pat) which started in London in 1964.

== Origin and development ==
The idea was formed during an evening conversation at Winthrop House in December 1964 which focused on "the irrationality of two particular social evils: the blind date and the mixer", as The Harvard Crimson described it in 1965. After the discussion, students Vaugh Morrill and Jeffrey Tarr contacted lawyers and computer technicians for confirmation their plan was feasible and drafted a questionnaire in about two weeks with assistance from the Social Relations department and their new collaborator Doug Ginsburg. By February 1965 they advertised the computerized date-making service, which planned to pair Ivy League men with women from the Seven Sisters. Participants filled out a 75-point questionnaire, covering hobbies, education, physical appearance, race and attitudes towards sex, that could then be mailed with a $3 fee. The questionnaire was geared to young college students seeking a date, not a marriage partner. Questions included "Do you believe in a God who answers prayer?" and "Is extensive sexual activity in preparation for marriage part of 'growing up?'" Participants provided two sets of responses, one describing themselves and another describing their ideal date.

By mid-March, Operation Match lacked sufficient participation to break even after the computer processing costs, and the founders pursued publicity events. Connections at the CBS television game show To Tell the Truth allowed Jeffrey Tarr to appear on the program as a mystery contestant to promote the upcoming match event. The Operation Match organizers generated additional publicity by paying highly-desirable bachelorette Vicki Albright to join the matchmaking pool, as the 19-year-old UCLA student had recently appeared on a Newsweek cover. Registrations doubled in the week before the deadline.

The questionnaires were transferred from paper to punched cards and processed on an IBM 7090 computer at the Avco service bureau in Wilmington, Massachusetts. About a week later, each participant received mail with an IBM 1401 printout containing names and telephone numbers for five potential matches.

== Expansion ==
Vicki Albright matched with student Kevin Lewis, and the story was covered widely in national newspapers. Ginsburg, Crump, and Tarr launched a rapid expansion to nationwide offices including New York and San Francisco, where the program sold sufficiently well to summer term students, as well as Cincinnati, Chicago, Pittsburgh, Los Angeles, Detroit, Boston, and Bloomington, where low participation caused significant overall losses. The business survived due to financial support from Data Processing, Inc. During the fall, Doug Ginsburg did not take classes and instead spent long days at the Compatibility Research office in Central Square managing three secretaries and pursuing potential expansions, such as high school matchmaking and roommate assignments, as well as film and television adaptions of the computerized match event.

Approximately 90,000 questionnaires were completed after six months of launch, with more than 100,000 respondents paired.

Operation Match was started by Harvard University undergraduate students Jeffrey C. Tarr, David L. Crump and Vaughan Morrill, with help from Douglas H. Ginsburg, then a student at Cornell University. Later in 1965, Tarr, Crump and Ginsburg formed the company Compatibility Research, Inc. and expanded the service to 70,000 participants in various cities. Ginsburg used the profits to pay for the remainder of his undergraduate degree and law school, later working as a Harvard professor before joining the administration of Ronald Reagan, who appointed him to the D.C. Circuit Court in 1986 before nominating him to the Supreme Court in 1987. The nomination attracted media attention to Ginsburg's background, such as a The New York Times headline that read "Nominee Left College to Be Matchmaker" as well as backlash to Ginsburg's admitted marijuana use during and after college which led him to withdraw his nomination.

In 2024, Patsy Tarr published Operation Match: Jeff Tarr and the Invention of Computer Dating, about her husband's role in the invention of the world’s first computer dating service.
