= Guy Wilkinson (physicist) =

British particle physicist (born 1968)

Guy Wilkinson FRS
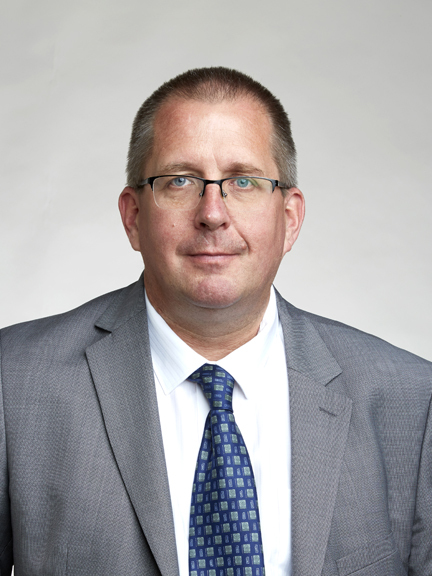
- Wilkinson in 2018
- Born: Guy Roderick Wilkinson; 1968 (age 57–58); Ashton-under-Lyne, Lancashire, England
- Education: Bishop's Stortford College
- Alma mater: Imperial College London (BSc); Magdalen College, Oxford (DPhil)
- Awards: Chadwick Medal and Prize (2017)
- Scientific career
- Workplaces: CERN; University of Oxford
- Thesis: A study of B⁰ B⁰ oscillations at the Z⁰ resonance (1993)
- Website: www.chch.ox.ac.uk/staff/professor-guy-wilkinson

Guy Roderick Wilkinson FRS (born 1968 at Ashton-under-Lyne) is an English particle physicist, working on the Large Hadron Collider project at CERN, professor of physics at the University of Oxford and a Fellow of Christ Church, where he holds the college's Alfred Moritz Studentship.

== Education ==
Wilkinson was educated at Bishop's Stortford College, Imperial College London and the University of Oxford where he was awarded a DPhil degree at Magdalen College in 1993 for a study of B⁰B⁰ oscillations at the Z⁰ resonance.

== Career and research ==
Wilkinson's career began in the study of electroweak physics on the DELPHI experiment, taking part in the measurement of the mass and width of the Z boson, and the mass of the W boson. Wilkinson currently specialises in CP-violation through measurements of processes involving the decays of hadrons containing beauty or charm quarks. He is a founding member and former spokesperson of the LHCb experiment on the Large Hadron Collider at CERN.

=== Awards and honours ===
In 2017, he was awarded the James Chadwick Medal and Prize by the Institute of Physics (IOP) for his work on heavy quarks. He was elected a Fellow of the Royal Society (FRS) in 2018.
