= Joan Ball =

Computer dating pioneer

Joan Ball (born 1934) is a British businesswoman who started the first computer dating service in England in 1964. Notably, it also pre-dated the earliest American computer dating services.

== Early life ==
Joan Ball, born in 1934, was the 4th surviving child.. During World War II she was evacuated from London to the countryside to escape the aerial bombardments. Joan was sexually harassed by one of the foster families with whom she lived in the countryside.

Joan Ball was dyslexic (although not diagnosed until she was 39) and struggled in school. In 1949, Ball finished her last year of school and got a job as a shop assistant at The London Co-operative Society. Due to her dyslexia she had problems with writing and counting money. In 1953, Ball was hospitalized after a suicide attempt, after which she lived with her aunt and uncle. The same year, at the age of 19, she was hired at Bourne & Hollingsworth. In 1954, she left and started working in a store's dress department. Shortly after she worked for Berkertex, a fashion house in London.

== Computer dating ==
In 1961, when Ball was 27, she took a job at a marriage bureau. She founded her own dating agency, the Eros Friendship Bureau Ltd in 1962. Ball claims that she had trouble advertising the service in newspapers because of the belief at the time that marriage bureaus were actually fronts for prostitution. To avoid this, Ball relied on placing radio ads with the "Pop Pirates." Ball's company focused on long term match-ups and relationships—primarily trying to achieve marriages for clients—and catered to an older crowd who were looking to settle down or who had been previously divorced.

In 1964, Ball changed the name of her marriage bureau to the St. James Computer Dating Service, and the bureau ran its first set of computer match ups in 1964. Ball used a time-shared computer and acquired a matching program that would pair couples based on questionnaire responses. This made Ball's service the first commercially successful computer dating service in either the UK or the US.

In 1965, Ball merged her company with another marriage bureau to form Com-Pat, or Computer Dating Services Ltd. Shortly after the merger, Ball bought out her co-owner's shares, making her sole owner. Ball advertised in The Sunday Express, Evening Standard, and The Observer At this time Ball was running both Com-Pat and Eros, ultimately selling Eros to focus on Com-Pat.

In 1970, Com-Pat Two was launched. The system used a questionnaire, and gave a list of four of the top matches at the end.

In 1971, a Post Office strike halted all mail and prevented business operations for almost eight weeks. The Daily Telegraph, the company's most successful advertising venue, refused to continue printing ads for Com-Pat after the paper changed their advertising policy. By 1974, Ball was in debt, and decided to sell her company. She sold it to John Paterson of Dateline on the condition that he pay all of the company's debts as part of the purchase.

== Personal life ==
In 1961, she met a man she refers to in her memoir as Kenneth. Kenneth later became her romantic and business partner, though they were never married. After the launch of Com-Pat ll, the two struggled financially and personally and ultimately separated after eight years together.

In 1973, Ball was diagnosed with dyslexia and depression. Ball is a convert to Buddhism.
