= Mixed-mating system =

Mixed-mating system may refer to one of two botany-related concepts:

- Mixed mating systems – Multiple modes of reproduction in plants, which may include self-fertilization
- Mixed-mating model – A mathematical model representing mating systems in plants
