= Carabus japonicus =

Scientific classification
- Kingdom: Animalia
- Phylum: Arthropoda
- Clade: Pancrustacea
- Class: Insecta
- Order: Coleoptera
- Suborder: Adephaga
- Family: Carabidae
- Genus: Carabus
- Species: C. japonicus

Binomial name
- Carabus japonicus Motschulsky, 1858

Species of ground beetle that predominates in Japan

Carabus japonicus is a ground beetle endemic to Japan. It inhabits the southwestern Japanese forests and is most frequently observed between May and September, with peak observations occurring mid-August. C. japonicus is a univoltine species, meaning it has one brood of offspring per year. Its larvae prey exclusively on earthworms. At lower altitudes, the reproductive cycle has been shown to coincide with the abundance of earthworms. This demonstrates the synchronization between the life cycles of the two species. The males tend to be slightly smaller than the females with both sexes having median body sizes of 24 mm and 26 mm, respectively. However, there is a large variation in intraspecific body size due to factors other than sex. These factors include parent size, food availability, and habitat temperature.

== Habitat ==
Ohomopterus beetles occur between 31° N and 44°N in latitude, 0 to 2000 m in altitude, and 6 °C to 17 °C in annual mean temperature. C. japonicus in particular predominates in the forests on Kyushu, the third largest of Japan's four main islands.

== Diet ==
Carabus japonicus larvae are specialized earthworm predators. Their predation success is dependent on earthworm size. Larger earthworms present a greater predatory challenge. Therefore, the success of larvae decreases with an increase in earthworm size. It follows that geographical variation in earthworm size may affect the body size of C. japonicus. A study examined the life cycle and abundance of earthworms at six different sites of varying altitudes. Earthworms appeared from April to September in all six study sites. At lower altitudes, the abundance of earthworms fell off dramatically after July. However, this effect was absent in the elevated sites. The median body weight of earthworms increased from April to July. This phenomenon was particularly apparent in the low-altitude sites. Larger beetles may be favored in the summer at lower altitudes because of the larger prey size. Larger females lay larger eggs. Therefore, they confer a phenotypic advantage to their progeny in environments where earthworms are larger. The diet of adult C. japonicus is more versatile than in its larval stage. It feeds on animals other than earthworms, like snails, slugs, isopods, and even dead vertebrates.

== Behavior ==
=== Mating ===
An experiment was conducted to demonstrate the effectiveness of body length differences to prevent interspecific copulation. A male and female of differing species (C. japonicus and C. dehaanii), were placed in a box together. Males of both species attempted to mate with the heterospecific female at a rate similar to that observed in intraspecific pairings. However, C. japonicus males are approximately 5 mm smaller than their C. dehaanii male counterparts. The difference in size between the heterospecific pairings resulted in the blocking of aedeagus insertion and unsuccessful spermatophore deposition. In this way, body size differences act as an effective reproductive barrier between C. japonicus and C. dehaanii. This effect can be generalized to other species interactions. Neither male to male competition (i.e. aggressive intraspecific conflict and territorial defense) nor courtship behavior is observed in C. japonicus. Instead, it has a mating system of promiscuity, in which there are no pair bonds. Females accept multiple matings with multiple males. A male recognizes a female by chemical signaling, approaches, and mounts its back. Males deposit larger spermatophores when mated with larger females. This is because larger females have more mature eggs. Copulation duration increases with an increase in male reproductive organ weight. This could be due to the increased time to deposit a larger spermatophore. However, smaller males stay mounted for longer (a 300-minute maximum, compared to a 50-minute maximum of their larger counterparts). This serves purposes other than insemination like mate guarding and assurance of sperm transfer into the spermatheca). Here, we see two distinct mating tactics, one offensive, the other defensive. Larger males spend less time in a mating posture, which permits more frequent copulations. Alternatively, smaller males spend more time in a mating posture, which increases likelihood of paternity (i.e. no spermatophore competition or displacement). Remating inhibition by seminal substances has been confirmed in C. japonicus through the induction of female refractory period. This function benefits males by decreasing spermatophore competition, but costs females through reducing mating opportunities, which could boost offspring fitness. Although females experience increased fecundity from increased mating, it also causes them physiological harm. Females can control the amount of ejaculation per mating through shifting mating posture.

=== Predation ===
Carabus japonicus larvae attack earthworms by snapping at them with their sharp, arcuate mandibles. When confined with earthworms in a box, C. japonicus will attack regardless of earthworm size. However, success among all instars (one through five) decreased with the increase in relative body weight of the earthworms. Conversely, success increased in all instars with the decrease in relative body weight of the earthworms. Small C. japonicus were unsuccessful in their predation attempts when it was thrown off by the earthworm's secretion of mucus and thrashing. When successful, it continuously bit until the earthworm's thrashing ceased and it became motionless. The C. japonicus proceeded with external ingestion of the carcass. Ohomopterus larvae can attack earthworms up to 400 times greater in body weight than themselves. To provide sufficient nutrition, the earthworm attacked needs to be 50 to 100 times heavier than the larva. C. japonicus sits and waits for prey. Upon detection of an earthworm, it probes the earthworm's body and snaps violently at its underside.

== Physiology ==
=== Body size ===
The body size of organisms is an important characteristic in all organisms because of its relation to both biological functions and fitness. In C. japonicus, this is no different. Body size differences preclude heterospecific mating, thus facilitating the coexistence of species. C. japonicus exhibit the converse cline of Bergmann's rule: they increase body size with increasing annual mean temperature. In northern Kyushu, mean body length in C. japonicus was shown to covary with temperature with an unstandardized beta of 0.594. This means that for each degree increase in temperature (in Celsius), the mean body length (in mm) increased 0.594 mm. Temperature is just one factor that has been shown to affect body size in C. japonicus. When in sympatry with (i.e. living with) the beetle C. dehaanii, C. japonicus is markedly smaller than when it is in allopatry (i.e. living independent of similar species). This body size variation in response to and in the absence of a similar species is indicative of character release, which in turn suggests the existence of evolutionary processes of phenotypic plasticity. In other words, competition affects body size. The genetic basis for differences in body size was confirmed in a laboratory experiment, which took beetles from four sites with different mean body sizes. Offspring developed under the same conditions. Cross-breeding of the populations of varying body size showed that body length was highly heritable. The body length male and female offspring were correlated with the mid-parental length (this measurement is calculated by adding the male body length to the female body length, then dividing this number by two to arrive at the average). The regression coefficient for the relationship between these two variables was 0.84 for males and 0.76 for females. This means that for each increase in mm of mid-parental length, body length was observed to increase 0.84 mm in male offspring, and 0.76 mm in female offspring. Further experimentation revealed three additional factors related to body length: egg size, larval growth rate, and larval development time. There was a positive correlation for all three of these variables. Additionally, larger females were shown to lay larger eggs without an impact on fecundity.

=== Genital morphology ===
The male inserts its aegeus into the female's vaginal opening. The endophallus is then everted from the aegeus into the vaginal appendix. The spermatophore emerges from the hook-like copulatory piece and is deposited in the vaginal apophysis. When the male body length is slightly smaller than that of the female, spermatophore deposition is more successful. This provides a potential explanation for the sexual dimorphic body size. The selection pressure of size-assortative mating promotes the slightly smaller male body size relative to females. The largest and smallest female body sizes result in improper positioning of the male genitalia, which leads to a failure to transfer gametes. However, males can adjust their posture to circumvent non optimal body size differences. Males with larger testes and accessory glands can eject larger spermatophores. Increased spermatophore size enhances paternity. This is particularly important given the promiscuous mating system of C. japonicus. A longer copulatory piece enables fixation of the endophallus in the proper position. Additionally, a longer copulatory piece enables the conservation of spermatophores.

== Life cycle ==
The life cycle of C. japonicus can be resolved to five distinct stages known as instars. It begins reproductive activity in the spring. C. japonicus at lower altitudes begin reproduction earlier in spring, but show shorter periods of activity. Populations at higher altitudes used the entire warm season for reproduction. The abundance of earthworms also affects the timing of C. japonicus hatching. Its seasonal life cycle is synchronized with the earthworm spring hatching to maximize food availability. In conditions of 20 °C and 16 hours light to 8 hours dark, the developmental process from egg to adult took approximately 50 days on average. The adult beetles overwinter to reproduce next breeding season. Some beetles live for more than one year and reproduce in successive breeding seasons. Mortality is high during active periods, but low during periods of dormant diapause (assuming the beetles have sufficient energy stored).
