= Candaulism =

Paraphilia

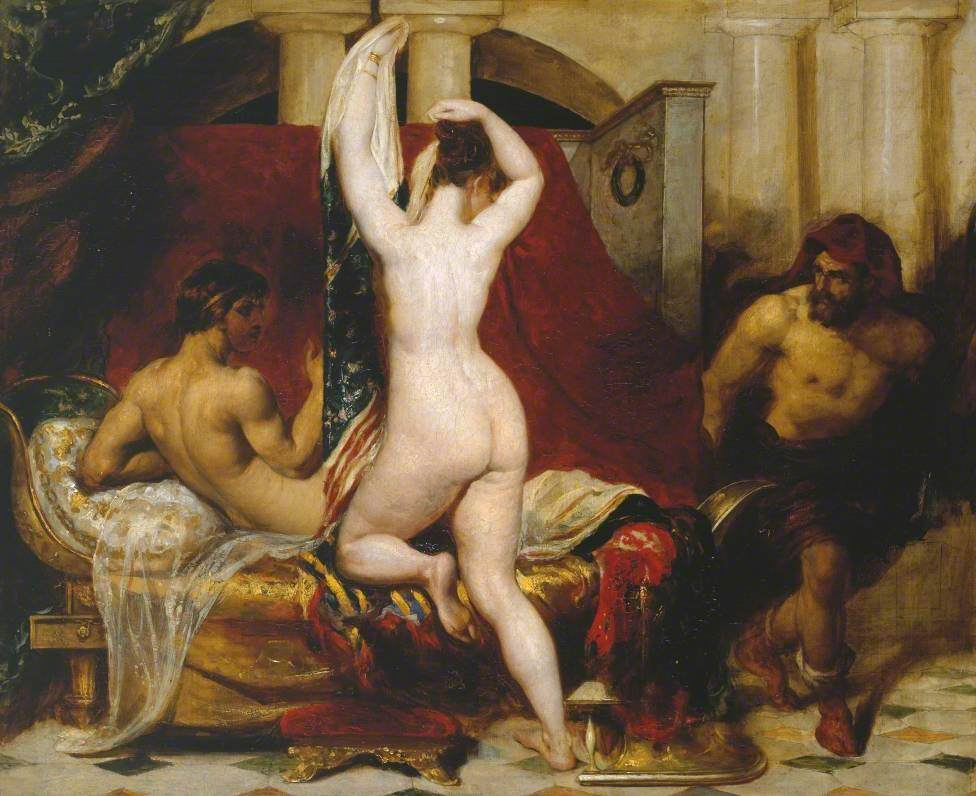
Candaules, King of Lydia, Shews his Wife by Stealth to Gyges, One of his Ministers, as She Goes to Bed by William Etty. This image illustrates Herodotus's version of the tale of Gyges.

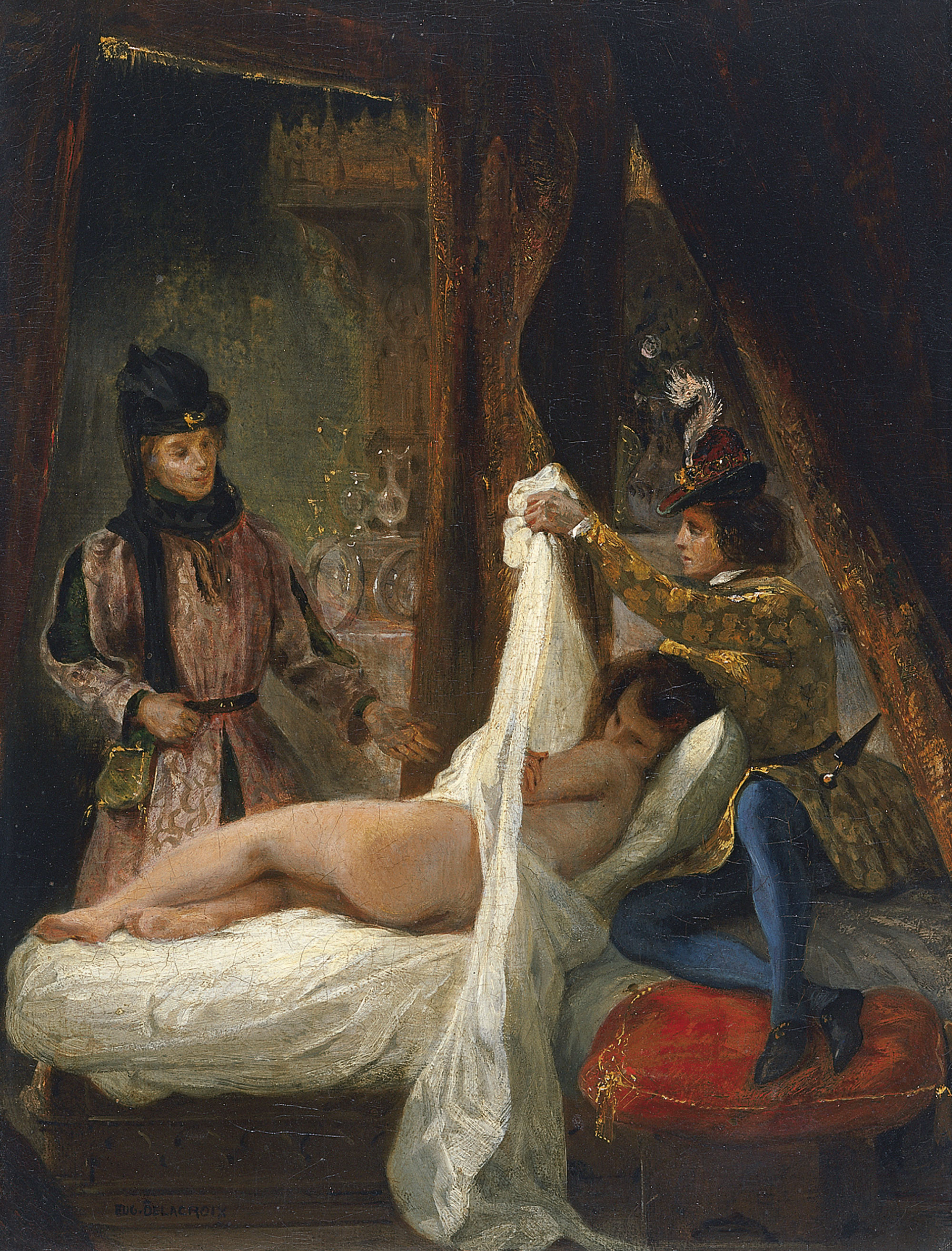
Duke of Orléans Showing His Lover by Eugène Delacroix

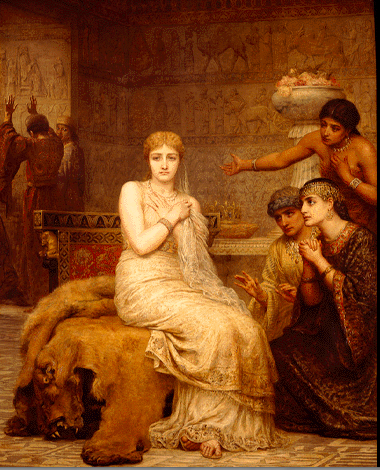
"Vashti Refuses the King's Summons" by Edwin Long

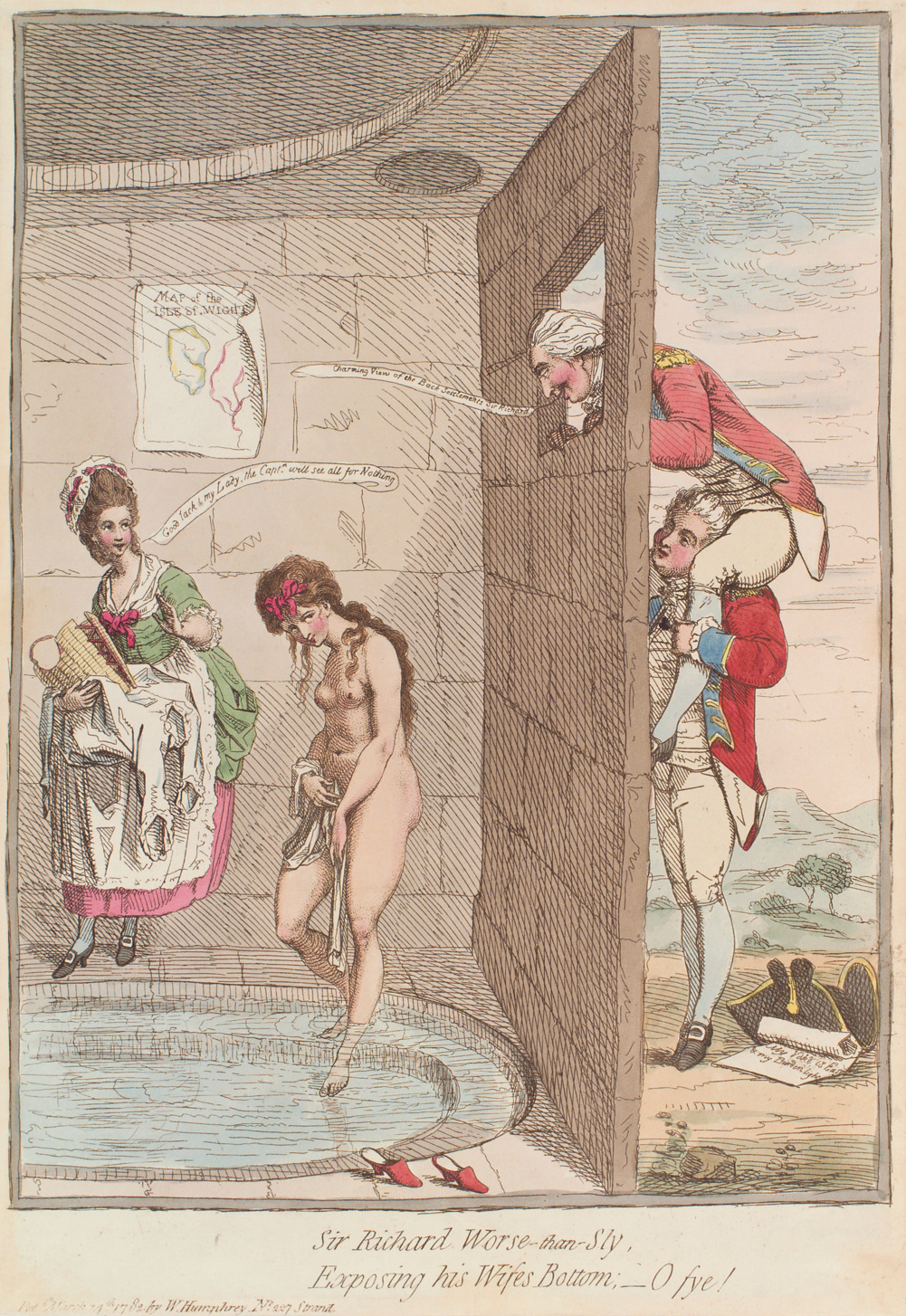
1782 cartoon by James Gillray, depicting Sir Richard Worsley helping George Bisset view his wife, Seymour Fleming, naked in a bath-house. The caption reads: "Sir Richard Worse-than-Sly / Exposing his Wifes Bottom; – O fye!"

Candaulism, also called candaulesism, is a paraphilic sexual practice or fantasy in which one person exposes their naked partner, or images of their naked partner, to other people for their voyeuristic pleasure or the pleasure of their partner. Candaulism is associated with voyeurism and exhibitionism.

The term may also be applied to the practice of undressing or otherwise exposing a partner to others, as well as to either the consensual or non-consensual (and therefore unethical and illegal) posting of personal images of a partner publicly or to urging them to wear clothing which reveals their physical attractiveness to others — such as a microskirt, tight-fitting or see-through clothing, low-cut top, or minimal-coverage swimwear.

== History of the term ==
The term is derived from an account in The Histories of Herodotus. King Candaules of ancient Lydia, according to the story, conceived a plot to show his naked and unaware wife to his servant Gyges. After discovering Gyges while he was watching her naked, Candaules' wife ordered him to choose between killing himself and killing her husband in order to repair the vicious mischief.

== Psychology ==
Isidor Sadger hypothesized that the candaulist completely identifies with his partner's body, and deep in his mind is showing himself. Candaulism is also associated with voyeurism and exhibitionism. An alternative definition proposes it as a practice involving one person observing, often from concealment, two others having sexual relations.

== Historical instances ==
In the 1782 case of Sir Richard Worsley against George Bissett for "criminal conversation"—that is, adultery with Lady Worsley—it was revealed that Sir Richard assisted Bissett to spy on Lady Worsley taking a bath.

The art collector and connoisseur Charles Saatchi has considered the influence of candaulism upon the work of Salvador Dalí, citing episodes recorded by the artist's biographers in which Dalí's wife Gala was displayed to other men.

Robert Hanssen was an American FBI agent arrested in 2001 for spying for the Soviet Union and the Russian Federation. It was disclosed that he had taken explicit photographs of his wife and sent them to a friend. Later, Hanssen invited his friend to clandestinely observe Hanssen having sex with Hanssen's wife during the friend's occasional visits to the Hanssen household. Initially, his friend watched through a window from outside the house. Later still, Hanssen appropriated video equipment from the FBI to set up closed-circuit television to allow his friend to watch from his guest bedroom.

== See also ==
- Amateur pornography
- Cuckquean
- Cuckold
- Droit du seigneur
- Erotic humiliation
- Fan service
- Secret Fantasy
- Indecent exposure
- Troilism
