= Effective selfing model =

The effective selfing model is a mathematical model that describes the mating system of a plant population in terms of the degree of self-fertilisation present.

== Overview ==
It was developed in the 1980s by Kermit Ritland, as an alternative to the simplistic mixed mating model. The mixed mating model assumes that every fertilisation event may be classed as either self-fertilisation, or outcrossing with a completely random mate. That is, it assumes that inbreeding is caused solely by self-fertilisation. This assumption is often violated in wild plant populations, where inbreeding may be due to outcrossing between closely related plants. For example, in dense stands, mating often occurs between plants in close proximity; and in plants with short seed dispersal distances, plants are often closely related to their nearest neighbours.

When both these criteria are met, plants will tend to be closely related to the near neighbours with which they mate, resulting in significant inbreeding. In such a scenario, the mixed mating model will attribute all inbreeding to self-fertilisation, and therefore overestimate the extent of self-fertilisation occurring. The effective selfing model takes into account the potential for inbreeding to occur as a result of outcrossing between closely related plants, by considering the extent of kinship between mates.

Ultimately, it is not possible to tease apart the two potential causes of inbreeding, and attributed the observed inbreeding to one cause or the other. Therefore, just as with the mixed mating model, in the effective selfing model there is only one parameter to be estimated. However this parameter, termed the effective selfing rate, is often a more accurate measure of the proportion of self-fertilisation than the corresponding parameter in the mixed mating model.
