= Mixed mating systems =

Plants which reproduce in multiple ways

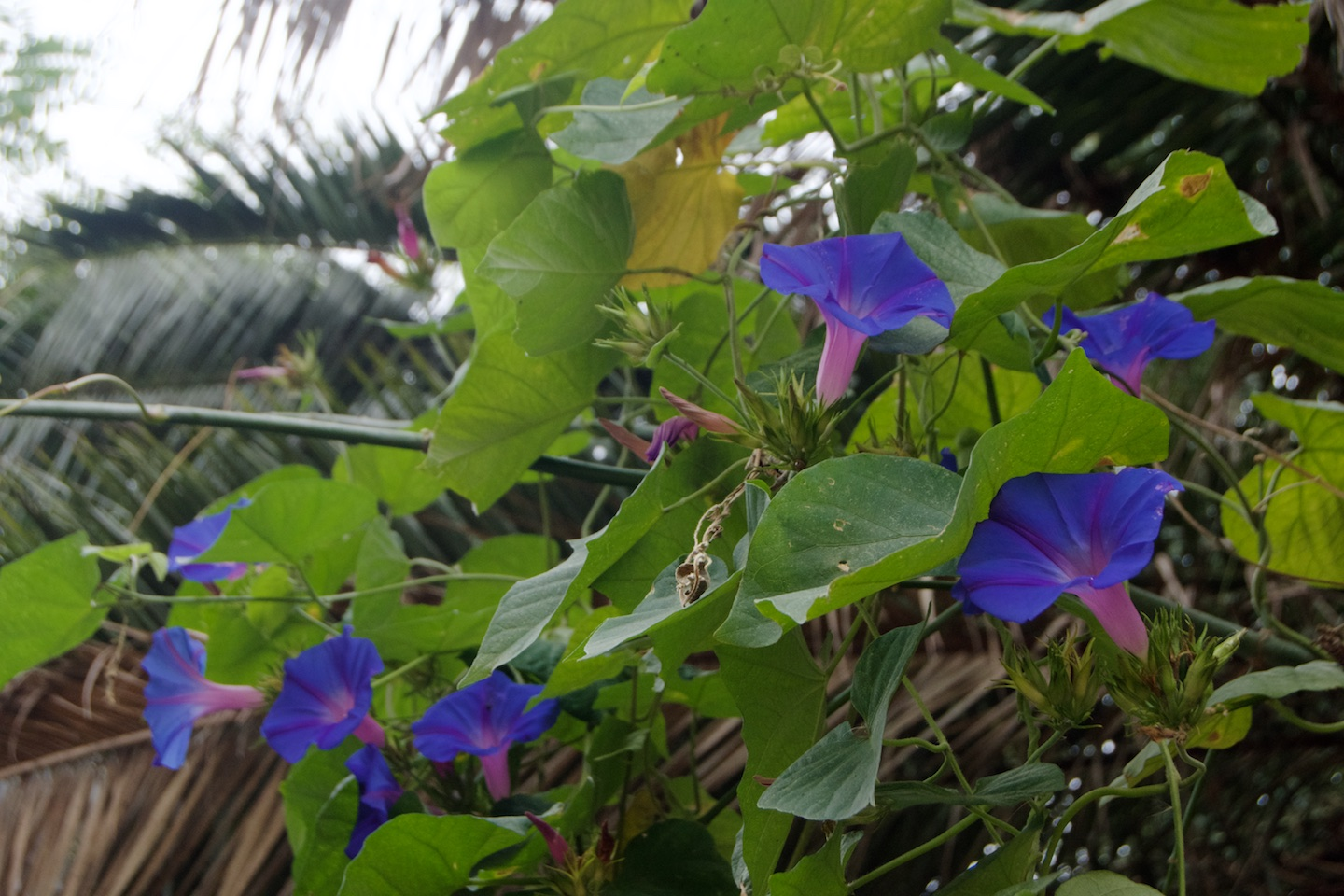
Morning glory vines spread their vegetation and flowers reproduce via mixed mating systems.

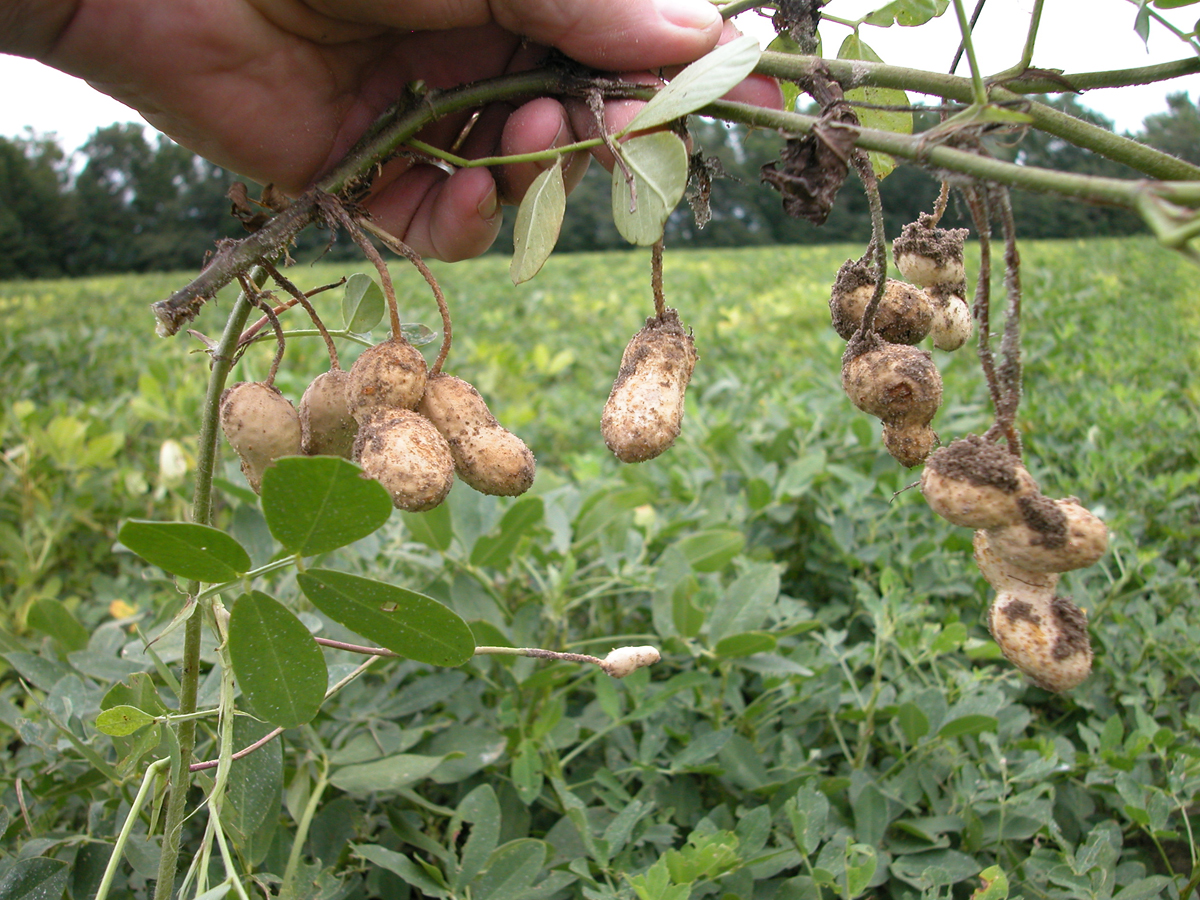
Peanut plants utilize mixed mating systems, often with cleistogamous flowers.

A mixed mating system (in plants), also known as “variable inbreeding”, is a characteristic of many hermaphroditic seed plants, where more than one means of mating is used. Mixed mating usually refers to the production of a mixture of self-fertilized (selfed) and outbred (outcrossed) seeds. Plant mating systems influence the distribution of genetic variation within and among populations, by affecting the propensity of individuals to self-fertilize or cross-fertilize (or reproduce asexually). Mixed mating systems are generally characterized by the frequency of selfing vs. outcrossing, but may include the production of asexual seeds through agamospermy. The trade offs for each strategy depend on ecological conditions, pollinator abundance and herbivory and parasite load. Mating systems are not permanent within species; they can vary with environmental factors, and through domestication when plants are bred for commercial agriculture.

== Occurrence ==
Although practiced by a minority of species, mixed mating systems are widespread. Examples of mixed mating systems in nature are found in jewelweeds, violets, morning glories, and bamboos, which are considered invasive in many regions. Mixed mating is common in many invasive species. Part of their ability to spread vigorously is sometimes attributed to changes in mating strategies, potentially caused by varying environmental factors, including pollinator service. Common commercial crops, including peanut plant, avocados, sorghum, and cotton, also exhibit mixed mating systems.

== Evolutionary models of mixed mating ==
Historically, Charles Darwin's experiments on selfing and out-crossing many plant species caused him to question any adaptive value of self-fertilization. Early evolutionary models assumed inbreeding depression did not change, which increased the likelihood of stable mixed mating.

Ronald Fisher (1941) presented the idea that selfing plants had a genetic transmission advantage over outcrossing plants because selfed offspring would inherit two copies of the seed parent's genome instead of just one. His models solidified the idea of automatic selection for increased selfing.

David Lloyd (1979) developed phenotypic models that showed that the conditions of automatic selection for selfing via pollinators was different from autonomous selfing, and predictive of stable mixed mating systems.

Lande & Schemske (1985) introduced the idea that inbreeding depression is not constant and evolves through purging of genetic load due to selection associated with selfing. They predicted that outcrossing as a mating strategy would resist increases in selfing frequencies due to inbreeding depression, but once inbreeding depression was reduced, selection due to the genetic transmission advantage would result in the production of only selfed seeds. Their model predicted that most plants would either be outcrossing or selfing. The observation of large numbers of species with mixed mating contradicted this idea, and motivated others to develop models to explain the prevalence of mixed mating systems including ideas such as selective interference and pollen discounting.

== Mechanisms maintaining mixed mating systems ==
Mass Action Model – Holsinger's “mass action” model assumes that the proportion of selfed and out-crossed seeds produced is a function of rates of pollen transfer among plants and plant density. This model predicts that mixed mating can be a stable strategy when plants receive mixtures of self and out-cross pollen.

Selective Interference –The genetic process of selective inference may prevent purging of genetic load and counterbalance the automatic selection of selfing.

Cryptic Self-Incompatibility – A mechanism of reproductive assurance, pollen competition favors out-cross pollen resulting in complete out-crossing when pollinators are abundant, but allows for self-fertilization when pollen is limited.

Delayed Selfing – A mechanism providing reproductive assurance at a lower cost than autonomous selfing, when the anthers or stigma change position as the flower ages, bringing them into close proximity and promoting self-pollination.

Reproductive Compensation – A result of more ovules than can mature into seeds, and the production of large numbers of seeds over the lifespan of a perennial plant, can contribute to the evolution of mixed mating systems. Rare selfed seedlings with higher fitness may decrease the fitness difference between selfed and out-crossed offspring.

Cleistogamy – Most plants producing cleistogamous (closed, selfing) flowers also produce chasmogamous (open, outcrossing) flowers, and consequently will typically produce mixtures of selfed and out-crossed seeds.

Components of the maintenance of mixed mating system also include self‐compatibility, especially autonomous self‐pollination, which can become particularly beneficial in human degraded habitats with less pollinators and increased pollen limitation.

== See also ==
- Mixed-mating model — Mathematical model representing mixed mating systems
