= Human sperm competition =

Form of sexual selection

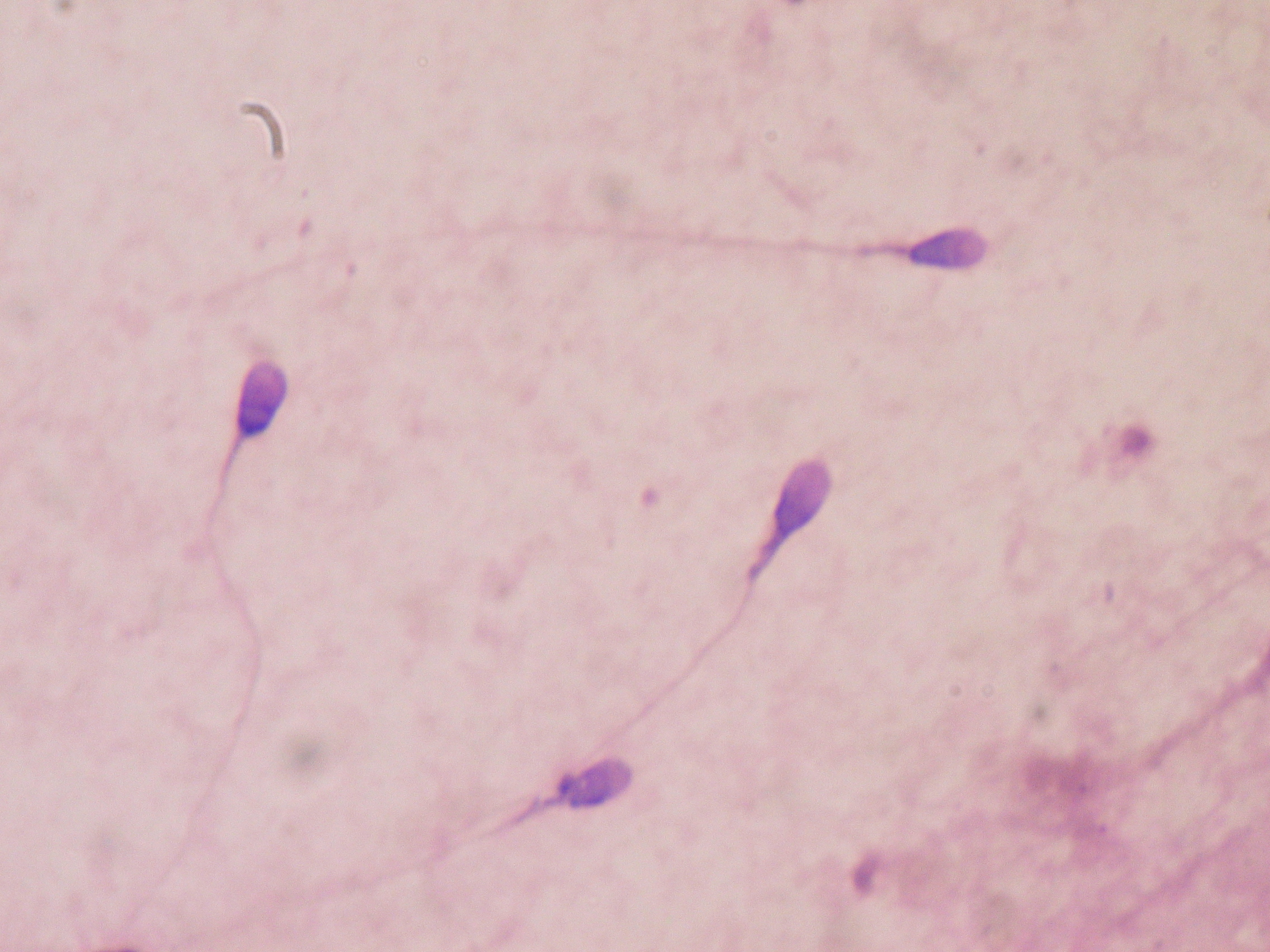
Stained human sperm

Sperm competition is a form of post-copulatory sexual selection whereby male sperm simultaneously physically compete to fertilize a single ovum. Sperm competition occurs between sperm from two or more rival males when they make an attempt to fertilize a female within a sufficiently short period of time. This results primarily as a consequence of polyandrous mating systems, or due to extra-pair copulations of females, which increases the chance of cuckoldry, in which the male mate raises a child that is not genetically related to him. Sperm competition among males has resulted in numerous physiological and psychological adaptations, including the relative size of testes, the size of the sperm midpiece, prudent sperm allocation, and behaviors relating to sexual coercion, however this is not without consequences: the production of large amounts of sperm is costly and therefore, researchers have predicted that males will produce larger amounts of semen when there is a perceived or known increase in sperm competition risk.

Sperm competition is not exclusive to humans, and has been studied extensively in other primates, as well as throughout much of the animal kingdom. The differing rates of sperm competition among other primates indicates that sperm competition is highest in primates with multi-male breeding systems, and lowest in primates with single-male breeding systems. Compared to other animals, and primates in particular, humans show low-to-intermediate levels of sperm competition, suggesting that humans have a history of little selection pressure for sperm competition.

== Physiological adaptations to sperm competition ==
Physiological evidence, including testis size relative to body weight and the volume of sperm in ejaculations, suggests that humans have experienced a low-to-intermediate level of selection pressure for sperm competition in their evolutionary history. Nevertheless, there is a large body of research that explores the physiological adaptations males do have for sperm competition.

=== Testis size and body weight ===
Evidence suggests that, among the great apes, relative testis size is associated with the breeding system of each primate species. In humans, testis size relative to body weight is intermediate between monogamous primates (such as gorillas) and promiscuous primates (such as chimpanzees), indicating an evolutionary history of moderate selection pressures for sperm competition.

=== Ejaculate volume ===
The volume of sperm in ejaculates scales proportionately with testis size and, consistent with the intermediate weight of human males' testes, ejaculate volume is also intermediate between primates with high and low levels of sperm competition. Human males, like other animals, exhibit prudent sperm allocation, a physiological response to the high cost of sperm production as it relates to the actual or perceived risk of sperm competition at each insemination. In situations where the risk of sperm competition is higher, males will allocate more energy to producing higher ejaculate volumes. Studies have found that the volume of sperm does vary between ejaculates, and that sperm produced during copulatory ejaculations are of a higher quality (younger, more motile, etc.) than those sperm produced during masturbatory ejaculates or nocturnal emissions. This suggests that, at least within males, there is evidence of allocation of higher quality sperm production for copulatory purposes. Researchers have suggested that males produce more and higher quality sperm after spending time apart from their partners, implying that males are responding to an increased risk of sperm competition, although this view has been challenged in recent years. It is also possible that males may be producing larger volumes of sperm in response to actions from their partners, or it may be that males who produce larger volumes of sperm may be more likely to spend more time away from their partners.

=== Size of sperm midpiece ===
Diagram of human sperm cell

The size of the sperm midpiece is determined in part by the volume of mitochondria in the sperm. Sperm midpiece size is tied to sperm competition in that individuals with a larger midpiece will have more mitochondria, and will thus have more highly motile sperm than those with a lower volume of mitochondria. Among humans, as with relative testis size and ejaculate volume, the size of the sperm midpiece is small compared to other primates, and is most similar in size to that of primates with low levels of sperm competition, supporting the theory that humans have had an evolutionary history of intermediate levels of sperm competition.

=== Penis anatomy ===
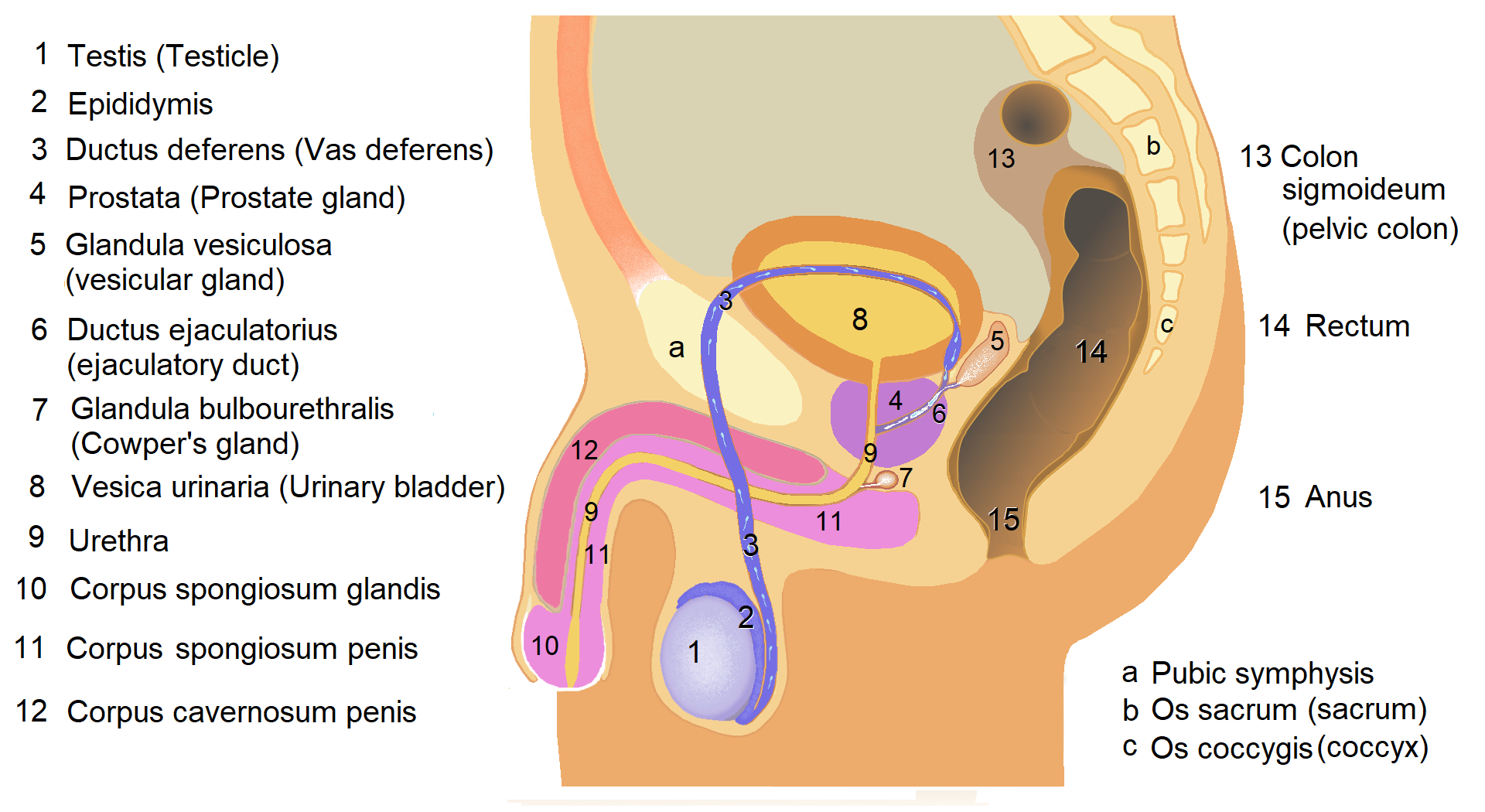
Diagram of human penis

Several features of the anatomy of the human penis are proposed to serve as adaptations to sperm competition, including the length of the penis and the shape of the penile head. By weight, the relative penis size of human males is similar to that of chimpanzees, although the overall length of the human penis is the largest among primates. It has been suggested by some authors that penis size is constrained by the size of the female reproductive tract (which, in turn is likely constrained by the availability of space in the female body), and that longer penises may have an advantage in depositing semen closer to the female cervix. Other studies have suggested that over our evolutionary history, the penis would have been conspicuous without clothing, and may have evolved its increased size due to female preference for longer penises.

The shape of the glans and coronal ridge of the penis may function to displace semen from rival males, although displacement of semen is only observed when the penis is inserted a minimum of 75% of its length into the vagina. After allegations of female infidelity or separation from their partner, both men and women report that men thrusted the penis more deeply and more quickly into the vagina at the couple's next copulation.

== Psychological adaptations to sperm competition ==
In addition to physiological adaptations to sperm competition, men also have been shown to have psychological adaptations, including certain copulatory behaviors, behaviors relating to sexual coercion, investment in relationships, sexual arousal, performance of oral sex, and mate choice.

=== Copulatory behaviors ===
Human males have several physiological adaptations that have evolved in response to pressures from sperm competition, such as the size and shape of the penis. In addition to the anatomy of male sex organs, men have several evolved copulatory behaviors that are proposed to displace rival male semen. For example, males who are at a higher risk of sperm competition (defined as having female partners with high reproductive value, such as being younger and physically attractive) engaged more frequently in semen-displacing behaviors during sexual intercourse than men who were at a lower risk of sperm competition. These semen-displacing behaviors include deeper and quicker thrusts, increased duration of intercourse, and an increased number of thrusts.

=== Sexual coercion and relationship investment ===
Men who are more invested into a relationship have more to lose if their female partner is engaging in extra-pair copulations. This has led to the development of the cuckoldry risk hypothesis, which states that men who are at a higher risk of sperm competition due to female partner infidelity are more likely to sexually coerce their partners through threatening termination of the relationship, making their partners feel obligated to have sex, and other emotional manipulations of their partners, in addition to physically forcing partners to have sex. In forensic cases, it has been found that men who rape their partners experienced cuckoldry risk prior to raping their partners. Additionally, men who spend more time away from their partners are not only more likely to sexually coerce their partners, but they are also more likely to report that their partner is more attractive (as well as reporting that other men find her more attractive), in addition to reporting a greater interest in engaging in intercourse with her. Men who perceive that their female partners spend time with other men also are more likely to report that she is more interested in copulating with him.

=== Sexual arousal and sexual fantasies ===
Sperm competition has also been proposed to influence men's sexual fantasies and arousal. Some researchers have found that much pornography contains scenarios with high sperm competition, and it is more common to find pornography depicting one woman with multiple men than it is to find pornography depicting one man with multiple women, although this may be confounded by the fact that it is less expensive to hire male pornographic actors than female actors. Kilgallon and Simmons documented that men produce a higher percentage of motile sperm in their ejaculates after viewing sexually explicit images of two men and one woman (a sperm competition risk) than after viewing sexually explicit images of three women, likely indicating a response to an active risk of sperm competition.

=== Oral sex ===
It is unknown whether or not men's willingness and desire to perform oral sex on their female partners is an adaptation. Oral sex is not unique to humans, and it is proposed to serve a number of purposes relating to sperm competition risk. Some researchers have proposed that oral sex may serve to assess the reproductive health of a female partner and her fertility status, to increase her arousal, thereby reducing the likelihood of her having extra-pair copulations, to increase the arousal of the male to increase his semen quality, and thereby increase the likelihood of insemination, or to detect the presence of semen of other males in the vagina.

=== Mate choice ===
Sperm competition risk also influences males' choice of female partners. Men prefer to have as low of a sperm competition risk as possible, and they therefore tend to choose short-term sexual partners who are not in a sexual relationship with other men. Women who are perceived as the most desirable short-term sexual partners are those who are not in a committed relationship and who also do not have casual sexual partners, while women who are in a committed long-term relationship are the least desirable partners. Following the above, women who are at an intermediate risk of sperm competition, that is women who are not in a long-term relationship but who do engage in short-term mating or have casual sexual partners, are considered intermediate in desirability for short-term sexual partners.

== Effects of sperm competition on human mating strategies ==
High levels of sperm competition among the great apes are generally seen among species with polyandrous (multimale) mating systems, while lower rates of competition are seen in species with monogamous or polygynous (multifemale) mating systems. Humans have intermediate levels of sperm competition, as seen by humans' intermediate relative testis size, ejaculate volume, and sperm midpiece size, compared with other primates. This suggests that there has been a relatively high degree of monogamous behavior throughout our evolutionary history. Additionally, the lack of a baculum in humans suggests a history of monogamous mating systems.

Males have the goal of reducing sperm competition by selecting women who are at low risk for sperm competition as the most ideal mating partners.

== Intra-ejaculate sperm competition ==
Noticing that sperm in a mixed sample tends to clump together--making it less mobile--and to have a high mortality rate, reproductive biologist Robin Baker, formerly of the University of Manchester, proposed about a decade ago that some mammals, including humans, manufacture "killer" sperm whose only function is to attack foreign spermatozoa, destroying themselves in the process.

To test this idea, reproductive biologist H.D.M. Moore, molecular biologist M. Martin and evolutionary ecologist Tim Birkhead (all from the University of Sheffield) mixed sperm samples from 15 men in various combinations and checked for how the cells moved, clumped together, or developed abnormal shapes. "These are very simple experiments, but we tried to mimic what goes on in the reproductive tract," Moore says. The team found no excess casualties from any particular donor or other evidence of warring sperm. "The kamikaze sperm hypothesis is probably not a mechanism in human sperm competition," says Birkhead.

The findings are "the nail in the coffin for the kamikaze hypothesis," says Michael Bedford, a reproductive biologist at Cornell University's Weill Medical Center in New York City. He says he had never given the idea much credence.

== Female responses to sperm competition ==
A survey of 67 studies reporting nonpaternity suggests that for men with high paternity confidence rates of nonpaternity are (excluding studies of unknown methodology) typically 1.9%, substantially less than the typical rates of 10% or higher cited by many researchers. Cuckolded fathers are rare in human populations. "Media and popular scientific literature often claim that many alleged fathers are being cuckolded into raising children that biologically are not their own," said Maarten Larmuseau of KU Leuven in Belgium. "Surprisingly, the estimated rates within human populations are quite low--around 1 or 2 percent." "Reliable data on contemporary populations that have become available over the last decade, mainly as supplementary results of medical studies, don't support the notion that one in 10 people don't know who their "real" fathers are. The findings suggest that any potential advantage of cheating in order to have children that are perhaps better endowed is offset for the majority of women by the potential costs, the researchers say. Those costs likely include spousal aggression, divorce, or reduced paternal investment by the social partner or his relatives. The observed low cuckoldry rates in contemporary and past human populations challenge clearly the well-known idea that women routinely 'shop around' for good genes by engaging in extra-pair copulations to obtain genetic benefits for their children," Larmuseau said.

Women are loyal to men who are good providers. "With DNA tests now widely available, so-called paternity fraud has become a staple of talk shows and TV crime series. Aggrieved men accuse tearful wives who profess their fidelity, only to have their extramarital affairs brought to light...The rule of thumb seems to be that males of higher socioeconomic status, and from more conventionally bourgeois societies, have greater warranted paternity confidence. Lower paternity confidence among those who are the principals for sensational media shouldn’t be surprising then."

== Sperm competition in other primates ==
The relative size of human male testes is bigger than those primates who have single-male (monogamous or polygynous) mating systems, such as gorillas and orangutans, while it is smaller when compared to primates with polyandrous mating systems, such as bonobos and chimpanzees. While it is possible that the large testis size of some primates could be due to seasonal breeding (and consequently a need to fertilize a large number of females in a short period of time), evidence suggests that primate groups with multi-male mating systems have significantly larger testes than do primates groups with single-male mating systems, regardless of whether that species exhibits seasonal breeding. Similarly, primate species with high levels of sperm competition also have larger ejaculate volumes and larger sperm midpieces.

Unlike all other Old World great apes and monkeys, humans do not have a baculum (penile bone). Dixson demonstrated that increased baculum length is associated with primates who live in dispersed groups, while small bacula are found in primates who live in pairs. Those primates that have multi-male mating systems tend to have bacula that are larger in size, in addition to prolongation of post-ejaculatory intromission and larger relative testis size.
