= Interlocus sexual conflict =

Type of sexual conflict

Interlocus sexual conflict is a type of sexual conflict that occurs through the interaction of a set of antagonistic alleles at two or more different loci, or the location of a gene on a chromosome, in males and females, resulting in the deviation of either or both sexes from the fitness optima for the traits. A co-evolutionary arms race is established between the sexes in which either sex evolves a set of antagonistic adaptations that is detrimental to the fitness of the other sex. The potential for reproductive success in one organism is strengthened while the fitness of the opposite sex is weakened. Interlocus sexual conflict can arise due to aspects of male–female interactions such as mating frequency, fertilization, relative parental effort, female remating behavior, and female reproductive rate.

As the sexes demonstrate a significant investment discrepancy for reproduction, interlocus sexual conflict can arise. To achieve reproductive success, a species member will display reproductive characteristics that enhance their ability to reproduce, regardless of whether the fitness of their mate is negatively affected. Sperm production by males is substantially less biologically costly than egg production by females, and sperm are produced in much greater quantities. Consequently, males invest more energy into mating frequency, while females are choosier with mates and invest their energy into offspring quality.

The evolutionary pathways resulting from interlocus sexual conflict form part of interlocus contest evolution, a theory describing the coevolution of different loci in a species through the process of intergenomic conflict. This has led to the proposal that sexual antagonistic coevolution is fueled by interlocus sexual conflict.

Well-evidenced examples come exclusively from the insect world, with the majority of research being conducted in yellow dung flies, Scathophaga stercoraria, and fruit flies, Drosophila melanogaster. Examples outside of these taxa are theoretical, though currently not well studied.

Interlocus sexual conflict differs from intralocus sexual conflict, a similar theory in which a set of antagonistic alleles resides on the same locus in both sexes.

== Theory development ==
=== Models ===
The first model of interlocus sexual conflict, the genetic threshold model, was developed by Parker to explain sexual conflict among yellow dung flies. Further investigation of sexual conflict theory remained relatively untouched until Rice predicted that genes for sexually antagonistic traits exist at the same loci of the sex chromosomes in both sexes, which led to the development of intralocus sexual conflict. Rice's genetic model of X-linkage influencing sexual dimorphism demonstrated that alleles for reproductive traits will persist if they increase the fitness of one sex, regardless of the associated cost for their mate.

An expansion of Parker's genetic threshold model was later used to examine how sex-linked harming alleles, or mutant alleles that cause males to harm females during reproduction, proliferate within a population and initiate interlocus sexual conflict. In a population of fruit flies where a Y-linked harming allele decreases the fitness of a female mate, an indirect cost is imposed on the male's fitness. Consequently, the harming allele is only favored in circumstances where the difference between offspring sired by harming males and normal males is greater for harming males, or harming males are at a fitness advantage.

The chase-away sexual selection model, proposed by Holland and Rice, enabled the prediction that mating discrimination by females will drive the evolution of male display features toward extreme phenotypes. As a result, an arms race develops where female mate choice drives male morphology. A model of antagonistic coevolution by Arnqvist and Rowe highlighted the example of abdominal spines in female water striders, Gerris incognitus, to demonstrate how this arms race leads to evolutionary adaptations in females. Female water striders achieve control over copulatory acts by using their spines as defense against aggressive males.

=== Interlocus contest evolution ===
Interlocus sexual conflict forms the basis for interlocus contest evolution (ICE), characterized by the coevolution of genes at different loci in a species through intergenomic conflict. In other words, a disequilibrium forms as alleles for reproductive traits are substituted at different loci in opposing sexes, resulting in rapid evolution of the trait at the locus, which further fuels an arms race between the sexes.

The Red Queen hypothesis postulates that evolution of a trait in one species will drive antagonistic coevolution in an opposing species and can be used to explain coevolution in cases of predatory behaviour, host-parasite relationships, and sexual selection. Of interest to interlocus sexual conflict, the Red Queen hypothesis allows for the evolution of traits that enhance reproductive fitness. ICE extends from this hypothesis, proposing that antagonistic coevolution does not require opposing species, but can be applied to genes at different loci in a single species.

== Versus intralocus sexual conflict ==
The genetic basis of the distinction between interlocus sexual conflict and intralocus sexual conflict is the location of the interacting antagonistic alleles. Conflict in which the antagonistic alleles are located at the same locus is termed intralocus sexual conflict. This occurs when males and females undergo different selective pressures at the same locus, resulting in either sex limiting the fitness of the other sex.

Importantly, many examples of sexual conflict are not categorized into interlocus sexual conflict or intralocus sexual conflict, as the genetic locations of the interacting alleles for these traits are not known or specified. It is critical to note when interpreting information regarding sexual conflict that these terms are sometimes used interchangeably, despite this being incorrect.

== Antagonistic coevolution ==
Sexual antagonistic coevolution is characterized by an arms race between the sexes in which one sex experiences changes in morphology or behaviour to compensate for the negative effects of the reproductive traits of the opposite sex. Both sexes strive to maintain an optimal fitness level, but do so at the expense of their mate's fitness. For interlocus sexual conflict to be a valid cause of antagonistic coevolution, the harm induced by the males across all loci has to outweigh the indirect benefits that the females gain by interacting with males.

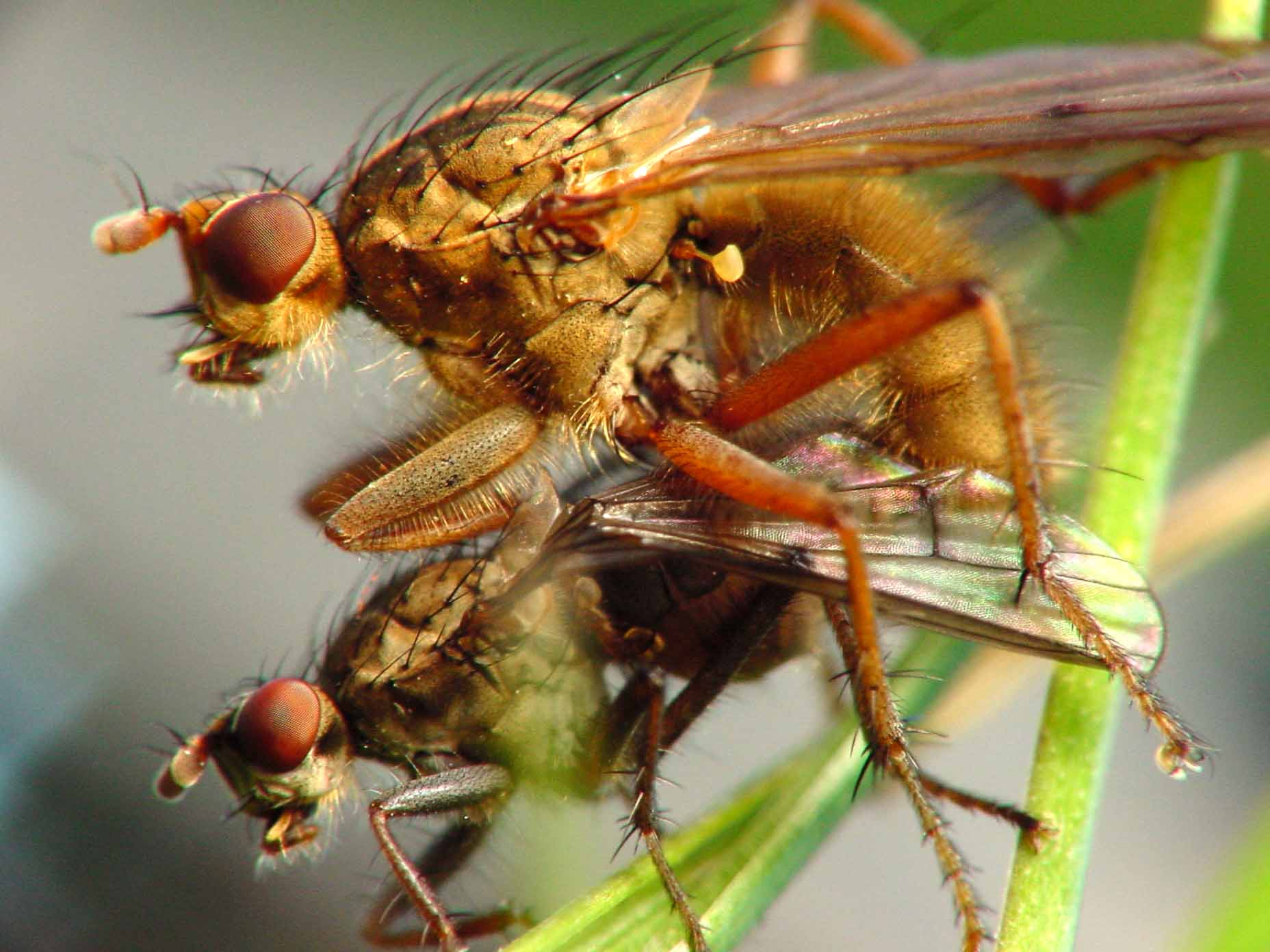
Copulation in Scathophaga stercoraria

== In Scathophaga stercoraria ==
Through Parker's genetic threshold model, it was discovered that female yellow dung flies can be injured in battles between male suitors. Males are selected to evolve traits for competitive ability that would increase their reproductive success, but females would evolve a set of antagonistic adaptations to reduce their chances of being injured during these interactions. Male yellow dung flies use pheromones, seminal fluid proteins (SPFs), and aggressive behaviour attributable to their size to manipulate females during courtship. As yellow dung flies are a polyandrous species, females obtain sperm from multiple males which is stored for fertilization. Larger males have a competitive advantage in displacing the sperm of other males, enhancing the likelihood of their sperm fertilizing the eggs. This phenomenon is termed sperm competition. In response, females have evolved larger spermathecae, spermicides, and an enhanced ability to select sperm based on the fitness of male suitors.

Scathophaga stercoraria displaying either polyandry or monogamy differ in female fitness. When females are placed in enforced polyandrous or monogamous mating conditions, females from polyandrous conditions exhibit substantially reduced fitness, displaying decreased egg production, decreased number of offspring, and a shortened life span compared to monogamous females after only one mating experience. Initially, it was suggested that the sexy son hypothesis was enough to compensate for the direct impact of antagonistic coevolution on female fitness. However, the detrimental fitness impact in females singly-mated with a polyandrous male suggests adaptations to resist harm by males requires competition, and is therefore better explained by interlocus sexual conflict.

== In Drosophila melanogaster ==
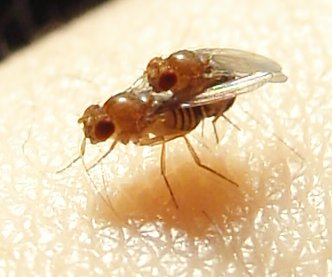
Copulation in Drosophila melanogaster

Drosophila melanogaster are a promiscuous species in which mate choice is a recurring event, fostering the development of interlocus sexual conflict.

The ejaculate of male fruit flies contains seminal fluid proteins (SFPs) that play a significant role in determining female fitness. SPFs are capable of influencing processes such as oogenesis, sperm storage, and the onset of ovulation. This ultimately leads to a decrease in female fitness, as increasing behaviours such as egg-laying can decrease the success of fertilization, delay remating, and impact the female's life span. In response to the negative effects of SPFs, female fruit flies have evolved resistance tactics to hyperactive males and refractoriness, resulting in interlocus sexual conflict. This has been supported in studies revealing the rapid evolution of SPF genes.

In a study examining fruit flies under polygamous and monogamous conditions, it was discovered that antagonistic coevolution decreases in monogamy, as the organisms mate with only one opposite-sex member and there is no competition among males to mate with the female.

In another laboratory study, a mutation that reduces the attractiveness of females was introduced into the genome of the experimental females. By reducing the attractiveness of the females expressing the trait, the mutation provided females with resistance to the direct costs of re-mating and male courtship. These results show that the resistance allele significantly accumulated in the experimental group, suggesting that the direct costs of male-courtship are greater than the indirect benefits of male-courtship.

Reciprocal crosses of Drosophila melanogaster have been used to investigate the evolution of sexual traits under allopatric conditions. In divergent populations, organisms will respond adaptively to local mates but not foreign mates. As a result, the female remating rate decreased significantly upon introduction of foreign males. Females are most resistant to males they coevolved with in local conditions, but show limited defense against foreign males.

== See also ==
- Intralocus sexual conflict
- Red Queen hypothesis
- Antagonistic Coevolution
- Interlocus contest evolution
- Sexual conflict
