= Husband =

Male spouse; man who is married

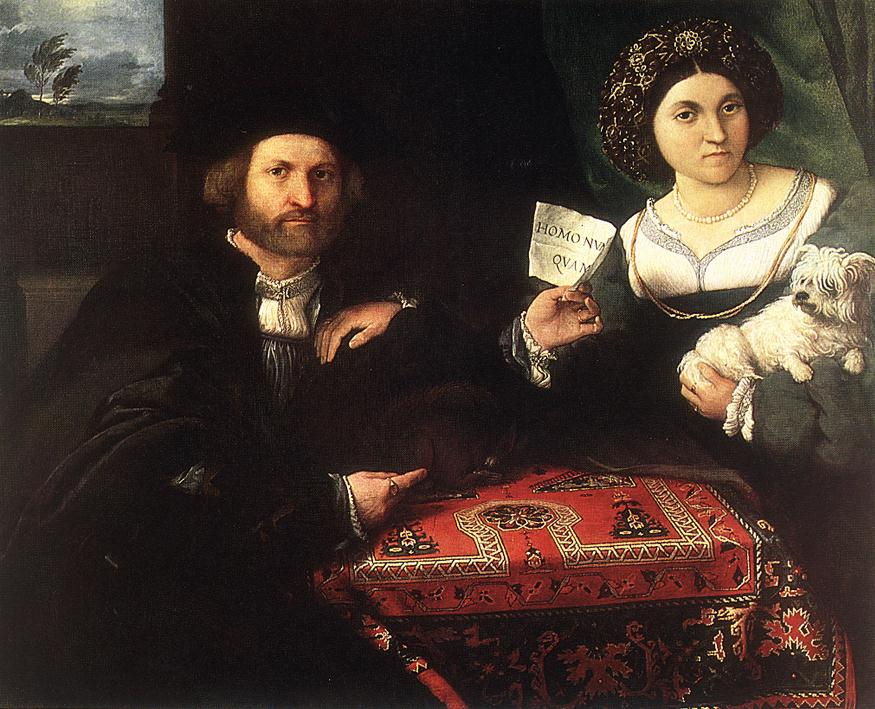
Husband and Wife (1523) by Lorenzo Lotto

A husband is a man involved in a marital relationship, commonly referred to as a spouse. The specific rights, responsibilities, and societal status attributed to a husband can vary significantly across different cultures and historical periods, reflecting a global perspective on this role.

In many parts of the world, heterosexual monogamous marriage is the prevailing norm, where a husband and wife form the basic unit of a family. Legal systems in numerous countries enforce monogamy and prohibit bigamy and polygamy. Traditionally, husbands often held the position of being the head of the household and the primary provider, a role that was often considered paternalistic. However, the evolving dynamics of modern society have led to a shift in these roles. Today, a husband is not automatically designated as the sole breadwinner, especially when his spouse pursues a more financially rewarding career. This change reflects a global trend in the changing dynamics of gender roles and family structures.

Moreover, the term "husband" continues to be applicable as long as a man remains married. However, it ceases to apply upon the legal dissolution of the marriage through divorce or the death of the spouse. Following the death of a spouse, the man is referred to as a widower, while after a divorce, he may be identified as the "ex-husband" of his former spouse. These terms and concepts are recognized worldwide, with cultural and legal variations shaping the specifics of husband-wife relationships on a global scale.

== Origin and etymology ==
The term husband refers to Middle English huseband, from Old English hūsbōnda, from Old Norse hūsbōndi (hūs, 'house' + bōndi, būandi, present participle of būa, 'to dwell', so, etymologically, 'a householder').

== Related terms ==
After a valid wedding, the marrying parties acquire the status of married persons and, while the marriage persists, a man is called a husband. In heterosexual marriages the woman is called a wife; in same-sex marriages between males, each male is called a husband.

Although 'husband' is a close term to 'groom', the latter is a male participant in a wedding ceremony, while the husband is a married man after the wedding and for the duration of the marriage. The term husband refers to the institutionalized role of the married male, while the term father refers to the male in the context of his offspring, a state which may or may not indicate that a marriage ceremony has taken place.

In some cases of heterosexual marriage, before the marriage, the forthcoming husband or his family may have received a dowry, or have had to pay a bride price, or both were exchanged. The dowry not only supported the establishment of a household but also served as a condition that if the husband committed grave offences upon his wife, he had to return the dowry to the wife or her family. At the time of the marriage, they were made inalienable by the husband. He might leave his wife (or wives), then widow (or widows), a dower (often a third or a half of his estate) to support her as dowager.

As an external symbol of the fact that they are married, each spouse commonly wears a wedding ring on the ring finger; whether this is on the left or right hand depends on the country's tradition.

Husband further refers to the institutionalized form in relation to the spouse and offspring, unlike father, a term that puts a man into the context of his children. Also compare the similar husbandry, which in the 14th century referred to the care of the household, but today means the "control or judicious use of resources", conservation, and in agriculture, the cultivation of plants and animals, and the science about its profession.

== Western culture ==
=== Historical status ===
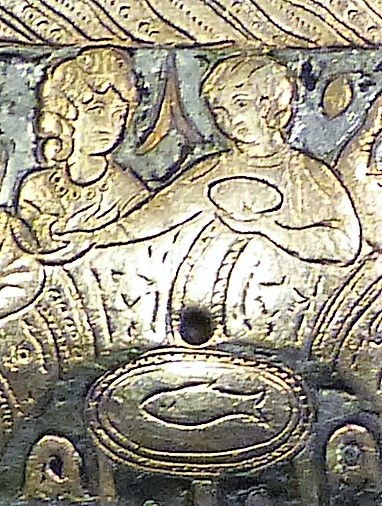
Seuso and his wife

In premodern heterosexual unions (ancient Roman, medieval, and early modern history), a husband was obliged to protect and support not only his wife and children but servants and animals of his domain. The father (as the "patron") was awarded much authority, differing from that of his wife (in these cultures, no polygamy existed).

In the Middle Ages and Early Modern European history, it was unusual to marry out of love, but then doing so became an influential ideal. During this period, a husband in a heterosexual marriage had more opportunities in society than his wife, who was not recognized as legally independent.

=== Contemporary status ===
In contemporary secularized Western culture, the rights of spouses have been made equal. Civil marriage generally forces the wealthier spouse, the "breadwinner", to provide alimony to the former spouse, even after separation and also after a divorce (see also Law and divorce around the world).

The legal status of marriage allows each spouse to speak on the other's behalf when one is incapacitated (e.g., in a coma); a husband is also responsible for his spouse's child(ren) in states where he is automatically assumed to be the biological father.

== Religion ==
=== Christianity ===
In Christianity, according to the Bible, a husband in a heterosexual marriage has several duties:

- To present his bride to God throughout their lives as perfectly holy and virtuous as can be.
- To protect his wife with his own life, physically, emotionally and "spiritually".
- To "lay down" his life, counting her more important than himself.
- To lead his wife and his family into the best things for them.
- To be the best that he can be in God's power.
- To not withhold his body from her.

=== Islam ===
In Islamic marital jurisprudence, husbands are considered protectors of the household and their wives. As a protector, the husband has various rights and obligations that he is expected to fulfil and thus is offered opportunities different from that of his wife or wives, not only in legal and economic affairs of the family but within the family as well. As in most cases in Islam law and culture, everything is related to the Qur'an.

Many Muslims may agree on a perfectly equal relationship. Islam is the only major religion that puts a cap on polygamy, limiting the number of a man's wives to four—provided the husband can do justice to all of them. Although some religions, such as Catholicism for instance, put a cap on polygamy altogether, or even serial monogamy, allowing one spouse until death does them apart, not even accepting divorce. According to the teachings of Islam, a Muslim man should have a valid reason and have to get permission from his existing wife (without any force) if he requires to marry again. Islam vehemently abhors any intimate relationship outside the bond of marriage.

There is no external sign to show his status as a husband unless he adopts the tradition of wearing a wedding ring.

=== Hinduism ===
A Hindu husband traditionally takes his wife to his home. He is expected to provide for her and to prove his abilities to do so. The marriage in Hinduism is a relationship for Seven births (सात जन्मों का सम्बन्ध). Before 1951 there was no divorce allowed in Hindu marriage.

In modern times once again after 1951, equal rights for women through society and law jurisdiction are given. In Hinduism, based on the different regions, the marriage process is observed differently with the same Saat Pheras around agni kund (light pyre) to be taken to become a husband and wife.

The Encyclopædia Britannica mentions that "In Hindu law, the male members of a joint family, together with their wives, widows, and children, are entitled to support out of the joint property."

=== Buddhism and Chinese folk religions ===
China's family laws were changed by the Communist Revolution; and in 1950, the People's Republic of China enacted a comprehensive marriage law including provisions giving the spouses equal rights with regard to ownership and management of marital property.

== Other cultures ==
In Japan, before the enactment of the Meiji Civil Code of 1898, all of the woman's property such as land or money passed to her husband except for personal clothing and a mirror stand.

== Expectation of fidelity ==
Although there is generally an expectation for a spouse not to have sexual relations with anyone other than his spouse(s), historically, in most cultures, this expectation was not as strong as in the case of wives, a situation which was evident in legal codes which prohibited adultery, with male adultery often being criminalized only if "aggravating" circumstances existed, such as if he brought his mistress into the conjugal home, or if there was a public scandal. The double standard was also evident in divorce laws of many countries, such as the UK or Australia, which differentiated between female adultery, which was a ground of adultery by itself, and male adultery, which was a ground only under certain circumstances. This double standard continues to be seen today in many parts of the world. For instance, in the Philippines, a wife can be charged with the crime of adultery (for merely having one act of sexual intercourse with a man other than her husband), while a husband can only be charged with the related crime of concubinage, which is more loosely defined (it requires either keeping the mistress in the family home, or cohabiting with her, or having sexual relations under scandalous circumstances).

A breach of this expectation of fidelity is commonly referred to as adultery or extramarital sex. Historically, adultery has been considered a serious offence, sometimes a crime. Even if that is not so, it may still have legal consequences, particularly a divorce. Adultery may be a factor to consider in a property settlement, it may affect the status of children, the custody of children, etc.

== See also ==
- Cuckquean
- Cuckold
- Female husband
- Husband-selling
- Concubinage
- Hypergamy
- Polygyny
- Polyandry
- Polygamy in Christianity
- Wife
