= Cuckold =

Husband of an adulterous wife

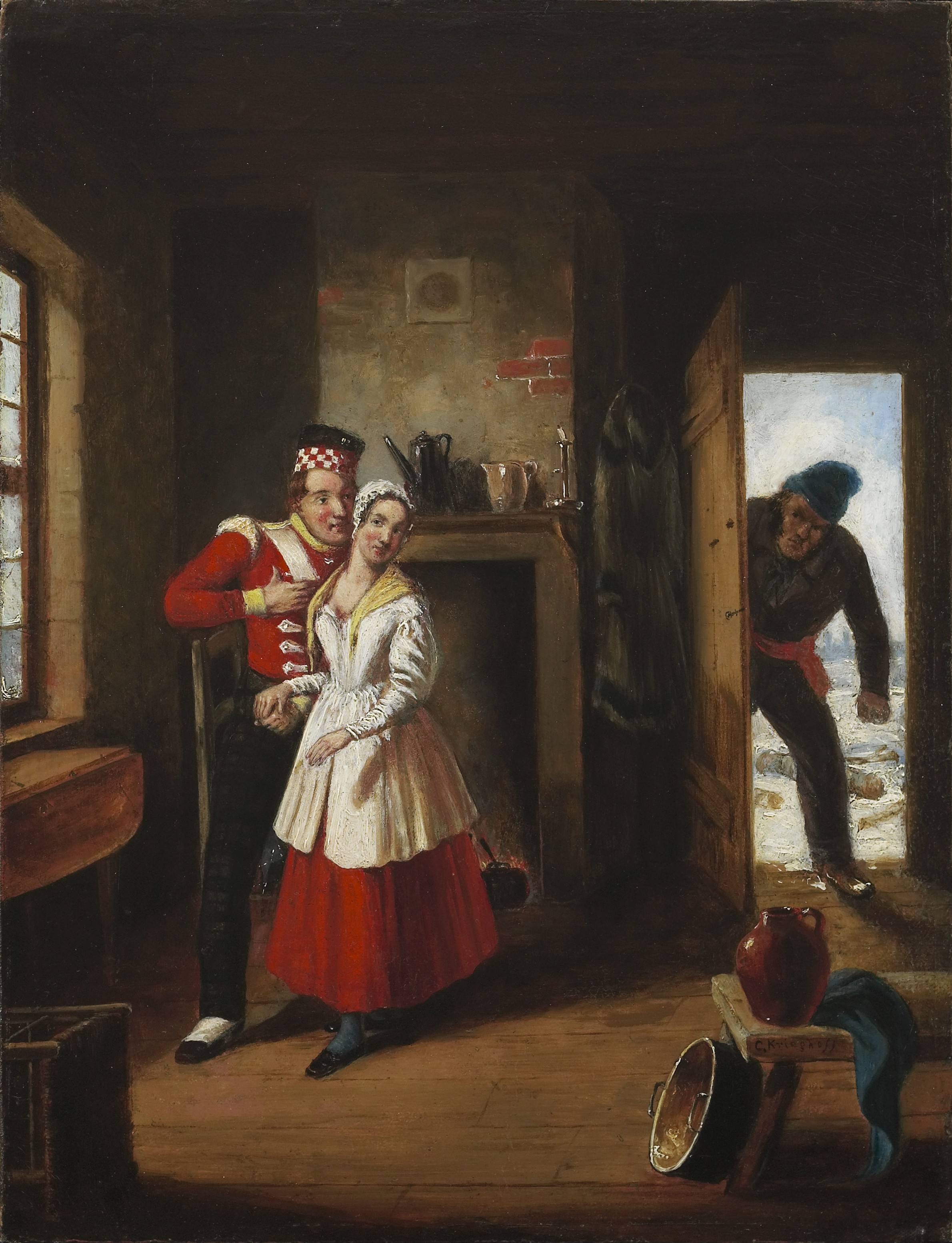
The Jealous Husband (1847), a genre painting by Cornelius Krieghoff depicting a cuckolded husband

A cuckold is the husband of an adulterous wife; the wife of an adulterous husband is a cuckquean. In biology, a cuckold is a male who unwittingly invests parental effort in juveniles who are not genetically his offspring. A husband who is aware of and tolerates his wife's infidelity is sometimes called a wittol or wittold. The slang term bull refers to the dominant man who has relations with the cuckold's partner.

== History of the term ==
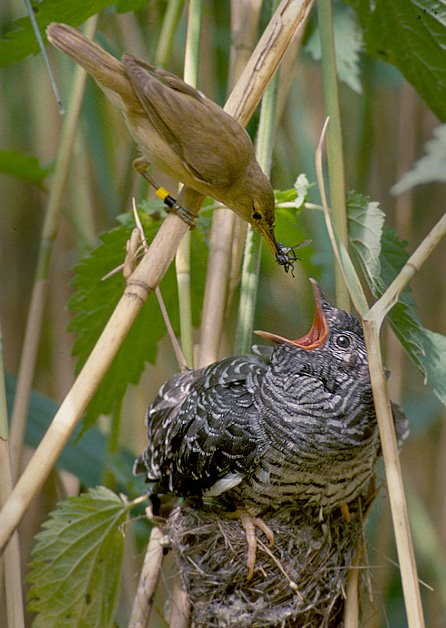
A reed warbler raising the chick of a common cuckoo; the term "cuckold" is derived from the cuckoo's tendency to lay eggs in the nests of other birds.

The word cuckold derives from the cuckoo bird, alluding to its brood parasitism, or tendency to lay its eggs in the nests of other birds. The association is common in medieval folklore, literature, and iconography.

English usage first appears about 1250 in the medieval debate poem The Owl and the Nightingale. It was characterized as an overtly blunt term in John Lydgate's The Fall of Princes, c. 1440. William Shakespeare's writing often referred to cuckolds, with several of his characters suspecting they had become one.

The word often implies that the husband is deceived; that he is unaware of his wife's unfaithfulness and may not know until the arrival or growth of a child plainly not his (as with cuckoo birds).

The female equivalent cuckquean first appears in English literature in 1562, adding a feminine suffix to the cuck.

A related word, first appearing in 1520, is wittol, which substitutes wit (in the sense of knowing) for the first part of the word, referring to a man aware of and reconciled to his wife's infidelity.

Cuckold is also abbreviated as cuck (and the verbal or adjectival form cuckolded to cucked, etc.), particularly as internet slang, which has also recently taken on a pejorative political undertone as well as sexual.

== Frequency of cuckoldry ==
Studies, including one from genetic genealogist Maarten Larmuseau, show that in Western society only 1–2% of births come from unfaithful mothers.

== Metaphor and symbolism ==
=== Horns and the rut ===
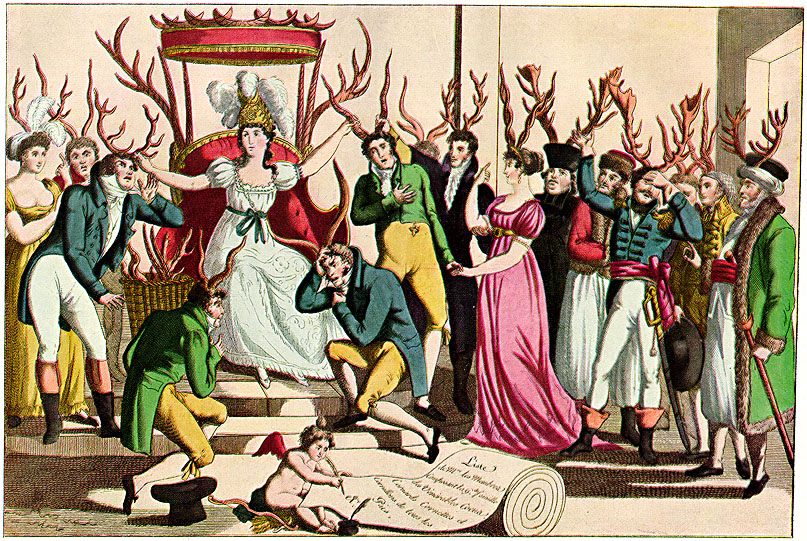
c. 1815 French satire on cuckoldry, which shows both men and women wearing horns

In Western traditions, cuckolds have sometimes been described as "wearing the horns of a cuckold" or just "wearing the horns". This is an allusion to the mating habits of stags, who forfeit their mates when they are defeated by another male.

In Italy (especially in Southern Italy, where it is a major personal offence), the insult "cornuto" is often accompanied by the sign of the horns. In French, the term is "porter des cornes". In German, the term is "jemandem Hörner aufsetzen", or "Hörner tragen", the husband is "der gehörnte Ehemann".

In Brazil and Portugal, the term used is "corno", meaning exactly "horned". The term is quite offensive, especially for men, and cornos are a common subject of jokes and anecdotes.

Rabelais's Tiers Livers of Gargantua and Pantagruel (1546) portrays a horned fool as a cuckold. In Molière's L'École des femmes (1662), a man named Arnolphe (see below) who mocks cuckolds with the image of the horned buck (becque cornu) becomes one at the end.

=== Green hat ===
In Chinese usage, the cuckold (or wittol) is said to be "戴綠帽子" dài lǜmàozi, translated into English as 'wearing the green hat'. The term is an allusion to the sumptuary laws used from the 13th to the 18th centuries that required males in households with prostitutes to wrap their heads in a green scarf (or later a hat).

== Associations ==
A saint Arnoul(t), Arnolphe, or Ernoul, possibly Arnold of Soissons, is often cited as the patron saint of cuckolded husbands, hence the name of Molière's character Arnolphe.

The Greek hero Actaeon is often associated with cuckoldry, as when he is turned into a stag, he becomes "horned". This is alluded to in Shakespeare's The Merry Wives of Windsor, Robert Burton's The Anatomy of Melancholy, and others.

== Cross-cultural parallels ==
In Islamic cultures, the related term dayyūṯ (Arabic: دَيُّوث) can be used to describe a person who is viewed as apathetic or permissive with regard to unchaste behaviour by female relatives or a spouse, or who lacks the demeanor (ghayrah) of paternalistic protectiveness. Variations on the spelling include dayouth, dayyuth, dayuuth, or dayoos. The term has been criticised for its use as a pejorative while also suggestive of acceptance of vain paternalistic gender roles, stigmatization of sexuality or overprotective intrusive sexual gatekeeping.

== Cuckoldry as a fetish ==
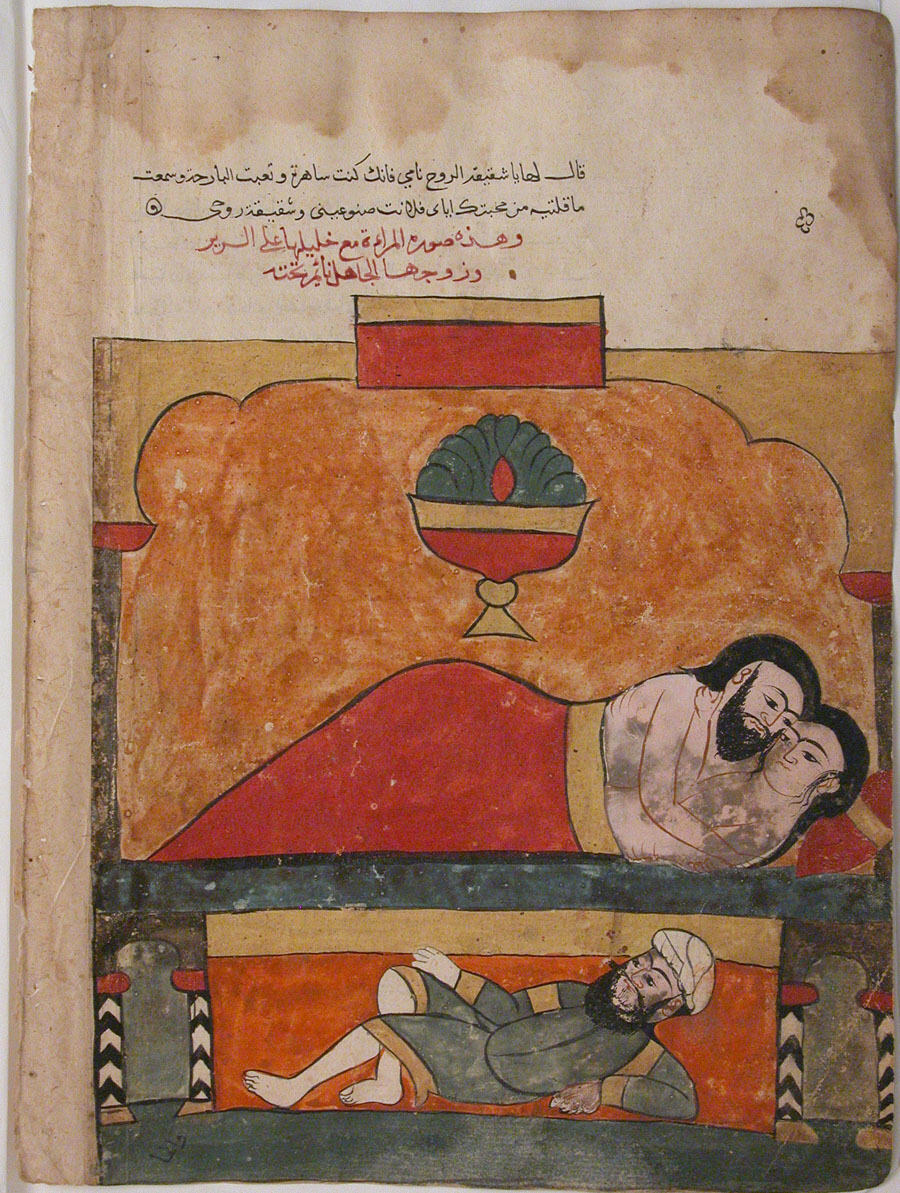
The Cuckold Carpenter Under the Bed of His Wife and Her Lover from an 18th-century edition of the Kalīla wa-Dimna

Unlike the traditional definition of the term, in fetish usage, a cuckold (also known as "cuckolding fetish") is complicit in their partner's sexual "infidelity"; the wife who enjoys "cuckolding" her husband is called a "cuckoldress." The dominant man engaging with the cuckold's partner is called a "bull."

If a couple can keep the fantasy in the bedroom, or come to an agreement where being cuckolded in reality does not damage the relationship, they may try it out in reality. This, like other sexual acts, can improve the sexual relationship between partners. However, the primary proponent of the fantasy is almost always the one being humiliated, or the "cuckold": the cuckold convinces his lover to participate in the fantasy for them, though other "cuckolds" may prefer their lover to initiate the situation instead. The fetish fantasy does not work at all if the cuckold is being humiliated against their will.

Psychology regards cuckold fetishism as a variant of masochism, with the cuckold deriving pleasure from being humiliated. In his book Masochism and the Self, psychologist Roy Baumeister advanced a Self Theory analysis that cuckolding (or specifically, all masochism) was a form of escaping from self-awareness, at times when self-awareness becomes burdensome, such as with perceived inadequacy. According to this theory, the physical or mental pain from masochism brings attention away from the self, which would be desirable in times of "guilt, anxiety, or insecurity", or at other times when self-awareness is unpleasant.

== See also ==
- Beta male
- Candaulism
- Crime of passion
- Cuckoldry in fish
- Cuckquean
- Erotic humiliation
- Female dominance
- Female promiscuity
- Feminization (activity)
- Human sperm competition
- Monogamish
- Netorare
- Non-paternity event
- Open marriage
- Paternity fraud
- Polyamory
- Polyandry, marriage to multiple husbands
- Pregnancy fetishism
- Swinging
- Voyeurism
