= Sex-limited genes =

Sex-limited genes are genes that are present in both sexes of sexually reproducing species but are expressed in only one sex and have no penetrance, or are simply 'turned off' in the other. In other words, sex-limited genes cause the two sexes to show different traits or phenotypes, despite having the same genotype. This term is restricted to autosomal traits, and should not be confused with sex-linked characteristics, which have to do with genetic differences on the sex chromosomes (see sex-determination system). Sex-limited genes are also distinguished from sex-influenced genes, where the same gene will show differential expression in each sex. Sex-influenced genes commonly show a dominant/recessive relationship, where the same gene will have a dominant effect in one sex and a recessive effect in the other (for example, male pattern baldness). However, the resulting phenotypes caused by sex-limited genes are present in only one sex and can be seen prominently in various species that typically show high sexual dimorphism.

Sex-limited genes are responsible for sexual dimorphism, which is a phenotypic (directly observable) difference between males and females of the same species regardless of genotype. These differences can be reflected in size, color, behavior (ex: levels of aggression), and morphology. An example of sex-limited genes are genes which control horn development in sheep: while both males and females possess the same genes controlling horn development, they are only expressed in males. Sex-limited genes are also responsible for some female beetles' inability to grow exaggerated mandibles, research that is discussed in detail later in this article.

Sex-limited genes were first hypothesized by Charles Darwin and though he was unsuccessful in distinguishing the previously mentioned sex-linked traits, his hypothesis was the starting point for future study of the subject. His studies on sex-limited traits have been further substantiated and supported over time, distinguishing sex-limited genes and sex-linked traits. Modern study of sex-limited genes includes research on epigenetics, which is the study of inheritable phentotypic changes with no change in DNA sequence. Modern research suggests that a substantial portion of the expression of sex-limited genes and sexual dimorphism may be influenced by certain epigenetic marks.

The purpose of sex-limited genes is to resolve sexual conflict. These genes try to resolve the "push-pull" between males and females over trait values for optimal phenotype. Without these genes, organisms would be forced to settle on an average trait value, incurring costs on both sexes. With these genes, it is possible to 'turn off' the genes in one sex, allowing both sexes to attain (or at least, approach very closely) their optimal phenotypes. This phenotypic variation can play a key role in the evolution of various species and their sexual differentiation.

== A brief history ==
The idea of sex-limited genes was initially developed by Charles Darwin in 1871 in his book The Descent of Man and Selection in Relation to Sex. He did not distinguish between sex-limited, sex-linked, and sex-influenced genes, but referred to any gene that expresses differently between sexes as sex-limited. Thomas Hunt Morgan, aware of this confusing terminology, published an article in The American Naturalist in 1914 titled "Sex-Linked and Sex-Limited Inheritance," which proposed definitions of sex-linked genes and sex-limited genes (as defined in the introduction above). Morgan's paper was followed by several others involving sex-limited genes and their expression as traits. One of the more notable examples is John H. Gerould's "Inheritance of White Wing Color, a Sex-Limited (Sex-Controlled) Variation in Yellow Pierid Butterflies," published in Genetics in 1923 (and edited slightly in 1924). Gerould observed the phenotypic differences between male and female Pierid Butterflies and determined colouration to be a sex-limited trait.

The notable advancements in the early stages of the development of sex-limited genes, a brief discussion of R. A. Fisher is necessary. Commonly hailed as one of the most significant evolutionary biologists of his time, Fisher was also a talented geneticist. His book The Genetical Theory of Natural Selection, published in 1930, over 20 years before the double-helix shape of DNA was discovered, was the first attempt to explain Darwin's theories within the foundation of genetics. Chapter 6 of this book is titled "Sexual Reproduction and Sexual Selection" and includes a genetic interpretation of Darwin's initial idea of sex-limited genes. After these groundbreaking works, papers continue to be published further exploring the causes, mechanisms, evolutionary advantages, and more of sex-limited genes.

== Genetics ==
The genetic study of sexual dimorphism, published in Evolution, hypothesizes two methods which leads to different ornamental characteristics in male and female birds. The alleles (different versions of the same gene) responsible for sexual dimorphism can be limited to expression in only one sex when they first appear, or the alleles could begin by being expressed in both sexes then become modified (repressed or promoted) in one sex by modifier genes or regulatory elements. The concept of this study was to examine female hybrids from species where males displayed different types of ornamental traits (elongated feathers, wattles, color patches). The assumption is that different hypotheses about male-specific expression will yield different results in female hybrids. The methods and materials of the experiment are discussed in detail in the paper, but the important result that emerged was that NO female hybrids expressed any of the ornamental traits found in the parent males. Two interpretations of these results are possible: the dimorphic alleles were initially only expressed in males, or the alleles were initially expressed in both and then were suppressed in females or became limited to males by regulatory regions that are completely dominant in hybrids. The most likely genomic explanation for initial expression in both species then modification is involvement of cis-dominance, where the factors that modify the gene are located next to the gene on the chromosome. (This is in contrast to trans-dominance, where mobile products that can affect distant genes are produced.) These factors can be in the form of promoter regions, which can be either suppressed or activated by hormones. This experiment also demonstrates that these alleles come under regulatory control very quickly. This is because none of the ornamentation seen in males is seen in the very next generation. These conclusions make it likely that at least some male-specific (thus, sex-limited) genes cue their expression by hormone levels, such as threshold ratios of estrogen and testosterone.

=== Storage effect ===
Because sex-limited genes are present in both sexes but only expressed in one, this allows the unexpressed genes to be hidden from selection. On a short-term scale, this means that during one generation, only the sex that expresses the sex-limited trait(s) of interest will be affected by selection. The remaining half of the gene pool for these traits will be unaffected by selection because they are hidden (unexpressed) in the genes of the other sex. Since a portion of the alleles for these sex-limited traits are hidden from selection, this occurrence has been termed 'storage-effect'. On a long-term scale, this storage effect can have significant effects on selection, especially if selection is fluctuating over a long period of time. It is inarguable that selection will fluctuate over time with varying levels of environmental stability. For example, fluctuations in population density can drive selection on sex-limited traits. In less dense populations, females will have less opportunity to choose between males for reproduction. In this case, attractive males may experience both reduced reproductive success and increased predation pressure. Thus, selection on males for sex-limited traits such as increased size (elephant seals) and weaponry (claws on fiddler crabs, horns on rhinoceros beetles) will change direction with fluctuation in population density.

=== Rapid evolution ===
John Parsch and Hans Ellegren defined "genes that differ in expression between females and males" as sex-biased genes. While this definition is more broad, sex-limited genes are certainly included in this category. One of the key principles of sex-biased gene expression that Parsch and Ellegren stressed in their paper in February 2013 is that of rapid evolution. They assert that a gene's sex bias can vary among different types of tissues throughout the body or throughout development, making the level of sex bias a fluid, rather than static, property. This makes it possible, then, that the rapid evolution seen in sex-biased genes is not an inherent property of their sex bias, but a property of some other feature. The paper offers expression breadth, the number of tissue types in which the genes are expressed, as an example of a feature correlated to sex-biased genes. It is known that genes with limited expression (in only one type of tissue) generally evolve faster than those with a higher expression breadth, and sex-biased genes are often restricted in their expression, such as to only the testes or ovaries. Thus, it is likely that sex-biased (including sex-limited) genes will evolve faster than the average genetic information. Parsch and Ellegren also assert that "sex-biased genes expressed only in sex-limited reproductive tissues evolve faster than unbiased genes that are expressed only in a single, non-reproductive tissue." That is, genes that have a bias toward any kind of reproductive tissue (testes or ovaries) seem to show faster evolution than genes expressed in non-gonadal tissues, despite the number of tissues in which they are expressed. This makes sense in the context of genes with reproductive function evolving more quickly, a generally observed pattern in evolutionary biology.

=== Effects of sexual antagonism ===
Sexual antagonism occurs when two species have conflicting optimal fitness strategies concerning reproduction (see link in introduction paragraph). Multiple matings is a classic example of competing optimal strategies. Males, who typically have a much lower overall investment in reproduction, may benefit from more frequent matings. Females, however, invest much more in reproduction and can be endangered, harmed, or even killed by multiple matings.

=== Effects on animal behavior ===
Animal behavior (see ethology) encompasses so many disciplines that it is impossible not to see it in some capacity in almost all primary literature involving live animals. While the examples above certainly contain aspects of animal behavior, a more overt example of it in relation to sex-limited traits is detailed in a Teplitsky et al. paper (2010) centering on breeding time in red-billed gulls. This experiment deals with breeding time, an aspect of reproductive biology. Reproduction and sexual behavior are two key aspects of animal behavior, as they are universally expressed in some way throughout the animal kingdom.

Breeding time in red-billed gulls is expressed only in females, because only females lay eggs. Male care, however, affects female breeding performance substantially. This qualifies breeding time as a sex-limited trait because it is expressed only in one sex but can be affected by both (similarly to Hosken's beetle experiment above). By following a natural population of red-billed gulls for 46 years, Teplitsky et al. came to an unexpected conclusion - while laying date (aka breeding time) is only expressed in females, the trait is only heritable in males. This is atypical because sex-limited traits are almost always heritable within the sex in which they are expressed.

For this species, the timing of egg-laying has much to do with male behavior. Males can affect female reproductive success so strongly because for the 20 days up to egg-laying, females spend up to 80% of their time in the nest. This leaves males with the responsibility of providing food regularly and securing (and maintaining) a high-quality territory for nesting. This phenomenon of the genetics of one individual affecting those of another individual is known as indirect genetic effects. For this population, at least, possible explanations for this atypical heritability pattern exist. While controlling female health and safety, males are responsible for the timing of the start of courtship feeding, as well. These populations also typically have excesses of females, allowing males to exert even further choice in the form of mate choice. These factors in combination give males a great opportunity to express their "laying date genotype". In spite of the presence of directional selection and significant male heritability for breeding time, no advancement of breeding time was seen during the 46 years of this experiment. This does not discount the significance of the paper's other results however - one of the most significant being that here a "female trait (laying date) is largely determined by genetic characteristics of its mate".

== Epigenetics ==
3-D microscopy of the inactive X-chromosome sex limiting gene

Epigenetics is the study of heritable phenotype changes, caused by modification of gene expression and does not entail a change in the genetic code. These epigenetic factors may also be sex-limited. Genomic imprinting for example, silencing of one parental allele by DNA methylation, for which sex-limited imprinting has been proposed to resolve intralocus conflict. Genomic imprinting has been shown to be indistinguishable from non-imprinted systems at the population level in some cases, having equivalent evolutionary models. However, this does not hold for sex-limited models of sex-limited imprinting which behave differently depending on which sex imprinting occurs and the parental sex of imprinted allele. Specifically, this affects whether alleles are imprinted in consecutive generations with different evolutionary trajectories (under the same selection fitnesses) arising purely due to sex-limited epigenetics. The X chromosome for example, has been very prevalent in the field of epigenetics. The X chromosome percentage between males and females is largely due to X chromosome inactivation. In humans, the process of X chromosome inactivation occurs in the beginning stages of development which is one of the main reasons why this topic has been challenging to study. In differentiating between the XX and the XY chromosomes, the amount of X-linked genes compared to XY males are due to the silencing of one of the two chromosomes in XX female. RNA X inactive specific transcript (Xist) regulates this whole process which results in a genome wide silencing. This is also a concept that is poorly understood which makes for great study and prolonged analysis. Indeed, over 20% of X-linked genes are expressed from the inactive X chromosome and they contribute to sexually dimorphic traits. The X chromosome makes a very small percentage of the total human genome and the epigenetics of this chromosome is a major contributor to certain diseases. Thus sex-limited epigenetic traits may have played a pivotal role in the evolution of mammals and other species, particularly as a mechanism to ameliorate intralocus conflict between the sexes.
