= Cuckquean =

Feminine version of a cuckold

A woman walking in on her cheating husband. (La Surprise, Sigmund Freudenberger

A cuckquean is the wife of an adulterous husband (or partner for unmarried companions), and the gender-opposite of a cuckold. In evolutionary biology, the term is also applied to females who are investing parental effort in offspring that are not genetically their own. The term is derived from Early Modern English dating back to 1562 and is composed of the terms cuck "someone whose partner is unfaithful" and quean ('disreputable woman').

== Cuckqueanry as a fetish ==
Among some fetishists, the cuckquean's humiliation or victimization is a major element of the paraphilia. For others, cuckqueanry has elements of voyeurism. The woman being cucked may enjoy directing the other two participants, in which case it can be a form of sexual domination.

In cuckqueaning, the male is known as the hothusband and the other female is known as the cuckcake. Cuckqueaning is often known as hothusbanding.

Cuckqueanry, like cuckolding, is commonly depicted as a heteronormative sexual fantasy and/or activity played out between a husband and wife, but can involve any number of gender and sexual orientations.

== See also ==
- Adultery
- Candaulism
- Crime of passion
- Concubinage
- Erotic humiliation
- Male dominance (BDSM)
- Netorare
- Open marriage
- Polyamory
- Polygyny
- Swinging
