= Interlocus contest evolution =

Interlocus contest evolution (ICE) is a process of intergenomic conflict by which different loci within a single genome antagonistically coevolve. ICE supposes that the Red Queen process, which is characterized by a never-ending antagonistic evolutionary arms race, does not only apply to species but also to genes within the genome of a species.

Because sexual recombination allows different gene loci to evolve semi-autonomously, genes have the potential to coevolve antagonistically. ICE occurs when "an allelic substitution at one locus selects for a new allele at the interacting locus, and vice versa." As a result, ICE can lead to a chain reaction of perpetual gene substitution at antagonistically interacting loci, and no stable equilibrium can be achieved. The rate of evolution thus increases at that locus.

ICE is thought to be the dominant mode of evolution for genes controlling social behavior. The ICE process can explain many biological phenomena, including intersexual conflict, parent offspring conflict, and interference competition.

== Intersexual conflict ==
A fundamental conflict between the sexes lies in differences in investment: males generally invest predominantly in fertilization while females invest predominantly in offspring. This conflict manifests itself in many traits associated with sexual reproduction. Genes expressed in only one sex are selectively neutral in the other sex; male- and female-linked genes can therefore be acted upon separated by selection and will evolve semi-autonomously. Thus, one sex of a species may evolve to better itself rather than better the species as a whole, sometimes with negative results for the opposite sex: loci will antagonistically coevolve to enhance male reproductive success at females’ expense on the one hand, and to enhance female resistance to male coercion on the other. This is an example of intralocus sexual conflict, and is unlikely to be resolved fully throughout the genome. However, in some cases this conflict may be resolved by the restriction of the gene’s expression to only the sex that it benefits, resulting in sexual dimorphism.

The ICE theory can explain the differentiation of the human X- and Y-chromosomes. Semi-autonomous evolution may have promoted genes beneficial to females in the X-chromosome even when detrimental to males, and genes beneficial to males in the Y-chromosome, even when detrimental to females. As the distribution of the X-chromosome is three times as large as the Y-chromosome (the X-chromosome occurs in 3/4 of offspring genes, while the Y-chromosome occurs in only 1/4), the Y-chromosome has a reduced opportunity for rapid evolution. Thus, the Y-chromosome has "shed" its genes to leave only the essential ones (such as the SRY gene), which gives rise to the differences in the X- and Y-chromosomes.

== Parent–offspring conflict ==
A father, mother and offspring may differ in the optimal resource allocation to the offspring. This co-evolutionary conflict can be considered in the context of ICE. Selection will favor genes in the male to maximize female investment in the current offspring, no matter the consequences to the female's reproduction later in life, while selection will favor genes in the female that increase her overall lifetime fitness. Genes expressed in the offspring will be selected to produce an intermediary level of resource allocation between the male-benefit and female-benefit loci. This three-way conflict again occurs when parents feed their offspring, as the optimum feeding rate and optimum point in time to discontinue feeding differ between father, mother and offspring.

== Interference competition ==
ICE can also explain the theory of interference competition, which is most likely to be associated with opposing sets of genes that determine the outcome of competition between individuals. Different sets of genes may code for signal or receiver phenotypes, such as in the context of threat displays: when a competing male can win more contests by intimidation, rather than by fighting, selection will favor the accumulation of deceitful genes that may not be honest indicators of the male’s fighting capability.

For example, primitive male elephant seals may have used the lowest frequencies in the threat call of a rival as an indication of body size. The elephant seal's enormous nose may have evolved as a resonating device to amplify low frequencies, illustrating selection that favors the production of low-frequency threat vocalizations. However, this counter-selects for receptor systems that provide an increased threshold required for intimidation, which in turn selects for deeper threat vocalizations. The rapid divergence of threat displays among closely related species provides further evidence in support of the co-evolutionary arms race within the genome of a single species, driven by the ICE process.
