= Isidor Sadger =

Austrian forensic psychoanalyst (1867–1942)

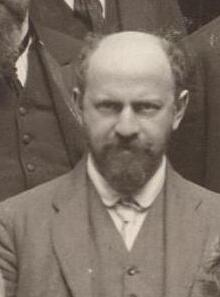
Isidor Sadger in 1911

Isidor Isaak Sadger (German: [ˈzaːdɡɐ] 29 October 1867 – 21 December 1942), born in Neu Sandez, Galicia, was a forensic medical doctor and psychoanalyst in Vienna. A leader in the early development of psychoanalysis, he began his career as a neurological specialist and, in 1894, began publishing a series of articles on psychophysiology. He studied with Sigmund Freud from 1895 to 1904 with a concentration in homosexuality and fetishism and coined the term Sadomasochismus (sadomasochism) in 1913.

In September 1942, he was deported to the Theresienstadt concentration camp, where he died.

== Work ==
Sadger published "Fragment der Psychoanalyse eines Homosexuellen" in the Jahrbuch für sexuellen Zwischenstufen in 1908. It described his analysis of a melancholy Danish count who was homosexual. The analysis lasted for only thirteen days before being terminated by the patient, whose sexual orientation was not changed. Later in 1908, Sadger published "Ist die konträre Sexualempfindung heilbar?", which assessed the value of psychoanalysis as a treatment for "contrary sexual feeling", in the Zeitschrift für Sexualwissenschaft. He answered the question of whether it could be cured in patients who were moral and determined "mit einem runden Ja!" ("with a definitive Yes!"). Sadger believed that it was not enough to establish a spurious kind of heterosexual functioning or "masturbatio per vaginam", wanting instead to change a patient's "Sexualideal", the internal image of his sexual object.

Freud stated in a note in his revised 1910 edition of "Three Essays on the Theory of Sexuality" that his conclusions about homosexuality were partly based on information obtained from Sadger. Sadger's main work, Die Lehre von den Geschlechtsverirrungen (Psychopathia sexualis) auf psychoanalytischer Grundlage was published in 1921. Although he supported a hereditarian degeneracy theory, Sadger usually argued that homosexuality was due to accidental family events, but for unclear reasons he frequently reported family histories of sexual inversion. Sadger followed Freud's idea that gay men unconsciously desire to castrate their fathers by rendering their male partners flaccid through orgasm so that they can magically incorporate their masculinity and finally obtain access to the mother.
