= Mixed-mating model =

Mathematical model of plant mating systems

The mixed-mating model is a mathematical model that describes the mating system of a plant population in terms of degree of self-fertilisation. It is a fairly simplistic model, employing several simplifying assumptions, most notably the assumption that every fertilisation event may be classed as either self-fertilisation, or outcrossing with a completely random mate. Thus the only model parameter to be estimated is the probability of self-fertilisation.

The mixed mating model originated in the 1910s, with plant breeders who were seeking evidence of outcrossing contamination of self-pollinating crops, but a formal description of the model and its parameter estimation was not published until 1951. The model is still in common use today, though a number of more complex models are also now in use. For example, a weakness of the model lies in its assumption that inbreeding occurs only as a result of self-fertilisation; in reality, inbreeding may also occur through outcrossing between closely related individuals. The effective selfing model relaxes this assumption by seeking also to estimate the degree of shared ancestry of outcrossing mates.
