= Intralocus sexual conflict =

Intralocus sexual conflict is a type of sexual conflict that occurs when a genetic locus harbours alleles which have opposing effects on the fitness of each sex, such that one allele improves the fitness of males (at the expense of females), while the alternative allele improves the fitness of females (at the expense of males). Such "sexually antagonistic" polymorphisms are ultimately generated by two forces: (i) the divergent reproductive roles of each sex, such as conflicts over optimal mating strategy, and (ii) the shared genome of both sexes, which generates positive between-sex genetic correlations for most traits. In the long term, intralocus sexual conflict is resolved when genetic mechanisms evolve that decouple the between-sex genetic correlations between traits. This can be achieved, for example, via the evolution of sex-biased or sex-limited genes.

Intralocus sexual conflict can be considered a form of maladaptation, as it results in a deviation of both sexes from their fitness optima, with both sexes expressing traits that are sub-optimal for that sex's fitness. Intralocus sexual conflict can also be considered a form of pleiotropy, in which genetic variants have opposing effects on different classes of individual within a population (i.e., males and females), rather than opposing effects on different components of fitness (e.g. survival vs. mating success). Intralocus sexual conflict has important implications for the evolution of sexual dimorphism, the evolution of sex chromosomes and the maintenance of genetic variation.

== Sexual conflict ==
All sexual conflict between the sexes arises because members of one sex express traits that benefit their ability to successfully survive and reproduce, while the expression of these traits negatively impacts the fitness of the opposite sex. In genetics, a locus refers to the exact location of a gene on a chromosome, and sexual conflict can have different consequences depending on the underlying genetics. Interlocus sexual conflict occurs at different loci in each sex, whereas intralocus sexual conflict occurs at the same loci. An example of interlocus sexual conflict is the expression of accessory gland proteins by males during mating, which negatively affect female fitness. This may result in a counter adaptation at a different locus to reduce harm in females. For example, a female may diminish detrimental consequences of being subjected to male accessory gland proteins during mating by waiting longer to re-mate, or she may develop an opposite physical adaptation of her reproductive tract.

Alternatively, sexual conflict may occur within the same locus, in which case it is known as intralocus sexual conflict. Intralocus sexual conflict occurs because many phenotypic traits are determined by a common set of genes which are found and expressed in both male and female individuals. For example, phenotypic traits such as body size, diet, development time, longevity, and locomotory activity are typically positively genetically correlated between sexes. These traits have also been suggested to underlie intralocus sexual conflict because they may be subjected to antagonistic patterns of selection, in which elevated values of one trait result in enhanced fitness in one sex but decreased fitness in the other, generating a negative correlation for fitness between male and female individuals that express a particular trait.

== Development ==
Bonduriansky and Chenowith proposed a four phase model for the development of intralocus sexual conflict, in which the first phase is stabilizing selection on a trait in both sexes. Intralocus conflict then originates in the second phase when a change in physical or social conditions causes intense selection on that trait in males and/or females, and both sexes are displaced from their optimum. In the third phase, diverging selection continues on both sexes, but is attenuated. In the fourth phase, intralocus conflict is fully resolved and sexual dimorphism has occurred.

== Examples ==
A good example of intralocus sexual conflict can be seen in humans, regarding the selection pressures on height that varies between sexes. In nature, a negative correlation between the height of a woman and her reproductive success has been seen, with selection favoring relatively shorter women. On the other hand, men of average height are preferred, and have higher reproductive success than men who are shorter or taller in nature. Studies have been able to produce evidence concluding that higher reproductive success is obtained by females in sibling pairs that were shorter in height, whereas reproductive success in sibling pairs of average height was much higher in males. These findings show that intralocus sexual conflict over a physical trait, such as height, can have an effect on Darwinian fitness in humans.

Intralocus sexual conflict diminishes the benefits of sexual selection. Examples of intralocus sexual conflict can be seen all throughout nature.

In humans, males and females who appear to be more masculine in their physical appearance for their sex report to have brothers that score a higher mate value relative to their sisters. Similarly, individuals who are of normal weight and have higher levels of estradiol are positively correlated with higher mate values in women, and higher levels of testosterone are positively correlated with higher mate values in men. Individuals that are physically and hormonally more masculine tend to have brothers that are fairly more attractive than their sisters, while more feminine individuals have sisters that are more attractive than their brothers. This suggests that intralocus sexual conflict can mediate and determine the fitness of an individual. Human hips are another example, where females need larger hips for childbirth as opposed to smaller hips (optimal for walking) for males. The genes that affect hip size must reach a compromise that is at neither the male optimum nor the female optimum.

In the Ibiza wall lizard (Podarcis pityusensis), intralocus sexual conflict exist over color. In this species, color is used as a signal of male fighting ability. Males that are more brightly colored are perceived as better fighters. As lizards in this species age, they become larger and more colorful. During mating seasons, males will typically compete for females and resources by fighting with each other. Males will select opponents based on the intensity of the color of their opponent's coat. Females of this species also possess brightly colored coats. This trait is detrimental for females, since being colorful makes them more conspicuous to males and predators. However, in males, being colorful helps males win fights and increases their reproductive success.

Another example can be seen in the features of the soay sheep (Ovis aries) horns, and the length of the serin finch's (Serinus serin) tail. Males that possess larger horns or longer tails in these species have higher success during male competition and increased reproductive success. However, these features require a great deal of energy for females to possess and do not benefit females in any significant way.

In Drosophila (D. melanogaster), direct evidence from knockdown of somatic expression of 125 genes reveals approximately 60% of these genes with strong or very strong conflicts between beneficial males and detrimental females. Meanwhile, approximately a quart of genes exhibit sexual conflict more often between beneficial females and detrimental males when germline expression are silences. In-depth genetic analyses of young genes, Apollo and Artemis, in D. melanogaster that were generated 0.2 million years ago through tandem duplication revealed co-evolution of complementary sexual conflicts with signals of resolution in both sequence divergence and functional evolution of species-specific gametogenesis genetic components.

Intralocus genetic differences between males and females have been identified in a variety of fish species using RAD sequencing, including gulf pipefish and deacon rockfish. It has been hypothesised that some of the loci in deacon rockfish may be examples of intralocus sexual conflict but their function and evolutionary significance is currently uncertain.

== Resolution ==
There have been several hypotheses made that attempt to explain possible resolutions for intralocus sexual conflict. In one proposition, it is suggested that intralocus sexual conflict can be minimized through sex-dependent gene regulation. By doing this, genes that are negatively selected may evolve sexually dimorphic traits that encourage sex- specific optima. Sexual dimorphism is thought to be an effective resolution, since it can be made irreversible under short term selection. As a result, sexual dimorphism could pose as a resolution to intralocus sexual conflict. Another proposed hypothesis suggests that intralocus sexual conflict can be resolved through alternative splicing. In this mechanism, the sex of an organism will ultimately decide the final form of the protein that is created from a shared coding region within a set of genes. Through this posttranscriptional process, RNA that is created by a gene is spliced in various ways that allow it to ultimately join exons in a variety of ways Genomic imprinting also presents as a possible resolution for intralocus sexual conflict. In genomic imprinting, genes are marked through methylation of DNA with information of its parental origin. In order for genomic imprinting to resolve intralocus sexual conflict, parents would have to imprint their genes in sex- specific matter. For example, males could imprint their genes in a way so that sexually antagonistic alleles that benefit males are not expressed in sperm that is only X-bearing.
