= Comparison of online dating services =

This is a partial, non-exhaustive list of notable online dating websites and mobile apps.

== Online dating services ==
Name	Description	Owner	Registered users	Free	All features free	Heterosexual connections	Polyamorous connections	Free Messaging	STD-notification
Adam4Adam	Connects gay men "for friendship, romance, or a hot hookup".			Yes	No	No	?	Yes	Yes
Adult FriendFinder	Members can connect with other adult members based on profiles.		30,000,000 as of 2006	No	No, free users cannot respond to contact and cannot initiate contact. Paid users have added benefits.	Yes	Yes	No	
AnastasiaDate	Connects Western men with women from Russia and former Soviet Republics – CIS		4,000,000 as of 2013	No	No	Yes	?	No	
Ashley Madison	Members are matched up with other married adult members based on their profiles.		60,000,000 as of February 2013	Yes	No; Free users can view profiles and respond to contact but cannot initiate contact. Paid users have added benefits.	Yes	Yes	No	
Badoo	Available in 44 languages on the web and on 12 different mobile platforms.	Bumble, Inc.	500,000,000 as of February 2021	Yes	No; Charge for higher prominence, higher limits, invisibility, etc.	Yes	?	Partial	
BeautifulPeople	Dating website where membership is based on a vote in which existing members rate how attractive they perceive prospective members to be.		800,000 as of 2015	No	No; free profile but subscription required for most features including messaging.	Yes	?	No	
Bumble	Dating app where women send the first message (for heterosexual matches)	Bumble, Inc.	22,000,000 as of 2017	Yes	No	Yes	?	After match; only woman can initiate	
Chyrpe	Dating app for female-led relationships	Greenrocks development	1,000,000 downloads	Yes	No; Free users are limited to 8 swipes each day to users within 500km. Paying users can apply more filters.	Yes	No	Yes	
Christian Connection	For Christian singles from the UK, Ireland, Australia, New Zealand, USA, Canada and Singapore			No	No; Free trial. Free basic profile members can still see photos, edit profiles, search, use discussion boards. Paid members can freely message, start discussion thread, no daily limit of discussion board entries. Basic profile members can only message other users with pre-set replies.	Yes		Partial	
ChristianMingle	Dating site that caters to Christian singles. Members may choose whether to specify the Christian denomination to which they belong.	Spark Networks Services GmbH	12,000,000 as of 2019	No	No	Yes	?	No	
Coffee Meets Bagel	App providing daily curated matches based on Facebook connections			Yes	No, "Beans" (in-app currency) unlock extra features, such as matching with users who aren't in your curated list. Premium membership enables activity reports, read receipts, extra beans.	Yes		Yes	
Cupid	Dating website	NSI Holdings Ltd.		No	No; Free: registration, profile, search, pictures uploading, send and receive winks, chat rooms, promo activities. VIP users can send and reply to mails, view full-size personal photos	Yes	No	No	
DateMySchool	Dedicated to verified college students and alumni (via education database). Can block by departments and schools.		179,000 as of 2013	No; All users can view profiles. Free messaging and status posting for undergraduates (5 messages/day limit). Alumni cannot initiate or respond to contact or post status updates. All Paid users can message and post and they also have added benefits.	Yes	?	Partial		
DOWN (app)	Online dating application for users looking for casual relationships and hookups. Users can swipe up for more serious dating, swipe down for casual hookups.			Yes	No; More features such as finding out who liked you.	Yes		After match.	
Duolicious	Open-source personality-quiz-based dating app; no swiping, users start conversations directly. Known for its 4chan origins.	Independent (open source, AGPLv3)	as of 2026 15,000 active	Yes	No; optional "Duolicious Gold" subscription unlocks cosmetic and convenience features.	Yes	Unknown	Yes, no match required	No
EHarmony	Dating site based upon pre-screening using personality tests.	ParshipMeet Holding GmbH		No	No; free profile but subscription required for most features including messaging.	Yes	?	No	
Facebook Dating	Digital dating product at Facebook	Meta Platforms		Yes	Yes	Yes	?	Yes	?
Feeld	Location-based dating app for users seeking a variety of non-traditional relationship structures and arrangements.	Feeld Ltd		Yes	No; "Majestic" tier offers additional features called Who Likes You, Filter by Desires, Incognito, Go Back, and Private Photo	Yes	Yes	Yes	?
Gaydar	Profile-based dating website for gay and bisexual men, women, and couples.			Yes	No; Chat and search is free.	No	?	Yes	
GayRomeo/ PlanetRomeo	Worldwide social network, instant messaging and dating community for gay, bisexual and transgender men.		6,740,000 registered and 1,107,000 active (last 6 weeks)	Yes	No: Communication, profile and picture views, search engine are free. Video downloads, higher database limits, deactivation of advertising are not.	No	?	Yes	
Gleeden	Social network, instant messaging and dating community for extra-marital relationships.			No	No: Costs credits to send and read messages unlimited number of times to one user and premium gives higher database limits, deactivation of advertising	Yes	?	No	
Grindr	Geosocial networking application based on Android and iOS for LGBT people.	San Vicente Acquisition LLC	3,600,000 daily active users as of 2018	Yes	No	No	Yes	Yes	Yes
Her	Geosocial networking application based on Android and iOS with Facebook integration. Cis men are not allowed to create profiles on the platform.			Yes	Yes	No	?		
Happn	Mobile single dating site		50,000,000 registered users as of 2019	Yes	No	Yes	Yes	Yes	
Hily	Mobile dating app		42,000,000 as of 2026	Yes	No	Yes	Yes (but preliminary heterosexual)	After match.	
Hinge		Match Group	20,000,000 people use Hinge (800,000 pay for premium services)	Yes	No; Free users are able to filter by age location, gender, ethnicity, and religion, and have limited swipes. Premium users can filter by more, including children, politics and drug use. Hinge Premium users are also able to see everyone who has liked them already.	Yes	?		?
JDate	Dating site that serves people of a Jewish background as well as those interested in them.	Spark Networks Services GmbH		No		Yes	?	No	
JSwipe	Online dating app targeted at millennial Jewish singles.	Spark Networks Services GmbH	800,000 as of September 2016	Yes	No; messaging without match	Yes	Implicitly discouraged	After match	
Keeper	LLM-assisted matcmatching platform for finding soulmates	Keeper Dating Inc.	1,600,000	Yes	Maybe; All women are matched on Keeper for free. However, if a man is offered a match on the platform, then he has to sign a "marriage bounty" contract where he agrees to $50,000 if his relationship is kismet.	Yes	No	No	
Lex (app)	Text-based dating and social app for LGBTQ users.	9count		Yes	Yes; features are free, but monthly post and message limitation	No	Yes	Yes	
Lovestruck	Online dating for single professionals in UK, Hong Kong and Singapore		300,000 registered as of 2012	No	No	Yes	?	No	
Mamba	Social-network-like dating site, primarily CIS/former Soviet Union, but some international presence. Primary language is Russian, but all languages welcome (and searchable). Caters to all audiences.		40,000,000 as of 2019	Yes	No: Communication, profile and picture views, simpler engine, blogs are free. Additional search criteria and double appearances in others' relevant searches for "VIP membership". Single payments for regional advertising of profile (one-time appearance in scrolling banner for $1 – user picture, link, short text for mouseover; bidding war for stationary second banner + cost of $1/minute).	Yes	?	Yes	
Manhunt	Profile-based dating website for gay men			Yes	No. Messaging, search, 20 profile views per day, video chat is free. Manhunt VIP includes unlimited profile views, view full-sized profile photos, unlimited buddies, unlimited blocks, saved searches	No	Yes	Yes	Yes
Match.com		Match Group	96,000,000 registered as of 2010 1,377,000 active (2009)	No	No	Yes	?	No	
Meetic	European online dating service	Match Group		No	No	Yes		No	
Muzz	Muslim-focused dating app	Shahzad Younas		Yes	No; Free to join, search, messaging, and chat. Additional features available for "Muzz Gold" subscribers.	Yes	No	Yes	
OkCupid (OkC)	Match system based on questions.	Match Group	30,000,000+ active as of 2013	Yes	No; Free to join, search, messaging, and chat. Phone verification needed in order to register an account or access a pre-existing account. Non-essential features like sponsored profile promotion available for paid "A-List" members.	Yes	Yes	Yes	
Parship	Dating site for people looking for a long-term relationship, using a personality test. Available in Europe and Mexico.	ParshipMeet Holding GmbH		No	No; free profile but subscription required for most features including messaging.	Yes		No	
POF (PlentyofFish)	Dating site mostly active in United States, Canada, United Kingdom and Brazil	Match Group, Inc.	100,000,000 registered as of 2015	Yes	No; Features such as seeing the date and time a user viewed your profile and allowing you to see whether a user read and/or deleted your message.	Yes		Yes	
Pure (app)	Dating site mostly active in United States, Canada and United Kingdom, average user between 25 and 40	Misterico Limited	500,000 registered as of 2021	Yes	No	Yes	Yes	Yes time-limited	
Raya	Exclusive, membership-based dating and networking app for creatives and public figures	Raya App, Inc.		No	No	Yes	?	After match	No
Scruff	Dating app for gay and bisexual men		15,000,000 registered users (2019)	Yes	No	No	Yes	Yes	Yes
Sniffies	Browser based dating and hookup app for gay and bisexual men			Yes	No	No	?	Yes	
Squirt.org	Cruising and hookup site for men seeking men			Yes	No	No	Yes	Yes	Yes
Taimi	Geosocial networking application based on Android and iOS for LGBTQI+ community.		2,000,000+ as of 2019	Yes	No	Yes	Yes	Yes	
Tinder	Mobile single dating site	Match Group	75,000,000 active users as of 2021	Yes	No – premium users get unlimited swipes, can undo a no-swipe, can browse in other locations, in addition to some other preferences and features	Yes	?	After match	
Zoosk	Has integration with a Facebook community.	Spark Networks Services GmbH	50,000,000 as of 2011	Yes	No; Searching and viewing partial profiles is included with free account like most dating sites, fee or monthly subscription for full communication with other members.	Yes		No	

== Defunct sites ==
- Craigslist (personal ads were removed)
- Find Your FaceMate
- Matchmaker.com (Dating service founded in 1986 which had 259,771 users)
- Nerds at Heart
- Perfectmatch
- Right Stuff
- SpeedDate.com
- Spoonr
- Spray Date
- Tastebuds.fm
- Travel Companion Exchange
- True
- Yahoo! Personals

== See also ==
- Timeline of online dating services
