= Beautiful People =

Beautiful People may refer to:

== Film, television, and theater ==
- Beautiful People (film), a 1999 British comedy
- Beautiful People (1974 film) or Animals Are Beautiful People, a South African wildlife documentary
- Beautiful People (American TV series), a 2005 drama series
- Beautiful People (British TV series), a 2008 sitcom
- The Beautiful People (audio play), a 2007 Doctor Who – The Companion Chronicles audio play
- The Beautiful People (play), a 1941 play by William Saroyan
- Beautiful People, the working title for the 2014 film Dead House
- "Beautiful Peoples", a 1983 episode of Bay City Blues

== Music ==
=== Performers ===
- Beautiful People (band), a 1990s UK Jimi Hendrix tribute act
- 120 Days, originally The Beautiful People, a 2001-2012 Norwegian band

=== Albums ===
- Beautiful People (album), by The New Seekers, 1971
- Beautiful People, or the 1967 title song, by Kenny O'Dell, 1968
- The Beautiful People (album), by SiM, 2016
- Beautiful People: The Greatest Hits of Melanie, a compilation album by Melanie, 1999

=== Songs ===
- "Beautiful People" (Australian Crawl song), 1979
- "Beautiful People" (Barbara Tucker song), 1994
- "Beautiful People" (Big Country song), 1991
- "Beautiful People" (Chris Brown song), 2011
- "Beautiful People" (David Guetta and Sia song), 2025
- "Beautiful People" (Ed Sheeran song), 2019
- "Beautiful People" (Pet Shop Boys song), 2009
- "Beautiful People", by ASAP Ferg from Always Strive and Prosper, 2016
- "Beautiful People", by Carolina Liar from Wild Blessed Freedom, 2011
- "Beautiful People", by Mark Pritchard, with vocals by Thom Yorke, 2016
- "Beautiful People", by Melanie from Affectionately Melanie, 1969; also recorded by The New Seekers (1971)
- "Beautiful People", by Rusted Root from When I Woke, 1994
- "Beautiful People", by Stress, 1991
- "Beautiful People (Stay High)", by the Black Keys, 2024
- "The Beautiful People" (song), by Marilyn Manson, 1996
- "The Beautiful People", by Tom Sankey from The Golden Screw, 1967

== Literature ==
- Beautiful People (manga), an anthology of short stories by Mitsukazu Mihara
- The Beautiful People (book), by Marylin Bender, 1967
- The Beautiful People, a 1952 short story by Charles Beaumont

== Other uses ==
- BeautifulPeople.com, a dating website
- The Beautiful People (professional wrestling), a professional wrestling stable

== See also ==
- "Beautiful People Beautiful Problems", a song by Lana Del Rey
- Beauty
- Jet set
