= The Right Stuff =

The Right Stuff or Right Stuff may refer to:

== Books, film, and TV ==
- The Right Stuff (book) (1979), by Tom Wolfe about the U.S. manned space program
- The Right Stuff (film) (1983), based on the book
- "The Right Stuff" (House) (2007), episode in the American series
- The Right Stuff (TV series) (2020), based on the book

== Media ==
- The Right Stuff (blog), a neo-Nazi and white supremacist media outlet and blog
- Right Stuff (company), 1990s Japanese video-game company
- Right Stuf, Western distributor of anime and other Asian video media
- The Right Stuff (dating web site), marketed towards students, faculty, and graduates of select universities and medical schools
- The Right Stuff (app), a discontinued dating app for American conservatives

== Music ==
- The Right Stuff Records, a record label

=== Albums ===
- The Right Stuff (album), by Vanessa Williams, 1988
- The Right Stuff, by Stuff, 1996

=== Songs ===
- "The Right Stuff" (Bryan Ferry song), 1987
- "The Right Stuff" (Vanessa Williams song), 1988
- "You Got It (The Right Stuff)", by New Kids on the Block, 1988
- "The Right Stuff", by Noel Gallagher's High Flying Birds from Chasing Yesterday, 2015
- "The Right Stuff", by Robert Calvert from Captain Lockheed and the Starfighters, 1974

== See also ==
- The Wright Stuff, a British television chat show
- The Write Stuff, a British radio quiz programme
