= MillionaireMatch =

American online dating website

- Company type: Private
- Website type: Online dating service Social network service
- Founder: Jason Du
- Website: www.millionairematch.com
- Registration: Yes
- Users: 3.8 million (February 2021)
- Launched: 2001
- Current status: Active

MillionaireMatch is an online dating website focusing on long term relationships and marriages, popular primarily in the United States, Canada, the United Kingdom, Australia and Germany. Because of the focus on relationships between attractive and wealthy singles, MillionaireMatch is considered a special-interest online dating brand. The company was launched in Silicon Valley, California by Jason Du.

== History ==
MillionaireMatch was founded by UC Berkeley graduate Jason Du in Silicon Valley in 2001, who currently serves as the company's CEO.

In 2015, MillionaireMatch deleted over 1,000 user profiles for not matching its criteria, with the users being "either not attractive or too poor" to be on the website.

By November 2016, the website had 2.9 million registered members, and by February 2021, the number of users increased to 3.8 million users with 2.6 million located in the United States.

== Operation ==
MillionaireMatch business model is based on a membership system with monthly subscriptions. There is also a free registration, but free accounts are limited in communication. Users can register for an account on a desktop browser or through its mobile app. According to DatingScout, "The member structure in MillionaireMatch is equally divided into men and women. Most users come from the United States and are in the age range of 35-54 years." There is a minimum income threshold for registration for those users who fall into category of "wealthy". The website is also available in iOS and Android mobile apps.

== Issues ==
The website has attracted considerable controversy in the media and much criticism since its inception due to its exclusive business model of only allowing perceived attractive or wealthy individuals to join the dating community. The company was also called "Sugar Daddy Dating Site" but it rejects that definition citing the company's focus on long term relationships and marriages.

== See also ==
- Comparison of online dating services
- Timeline of online dating services

== Externally links ==
- Official website
