= Safka =

Safka may refer to:

- Jim Safka (born 1968), American chief executive
- Melanie Safka (1947–2024), American singer-songwriter
- Finnish Anti-Fascist Committee (SAFKA), an organisation
