= Happn =

Online dating application

happn
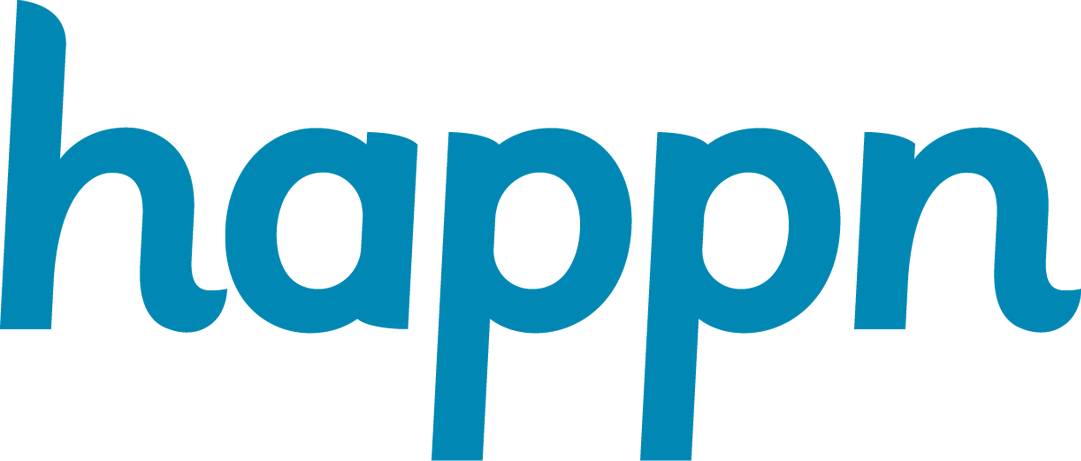
- Release: 2013
- Operating system: iOS, Android, Windows Phone, Web
- Type: Dating app
- Website: happn.com

happn is a French location-based social search mobile and web application that allows users to like or dislike other users, and allows users to chat if both parties liked each other (a match). The app is used as an online dating application.

== History ==
happn was founded by Didier Rappaport, Fabien Cohen and Antony Cohen in 2014. and developed by FTW & Co. In July 2014, the app had 40,000 daily users. In January 2016, happn had 10 million users.

The number of subscribers remained stable between 2018 and February 2019: around fifty million users were then registered in around forty countries around the world, including nearly four million in France and nearly one million in Paris. The company then employed more than one hundred people.

In July 2021, Didier Rappaport left the company following the publication of an article by Mediapart exposing allegations of sexual behaviour and harassment towards his employees (70 testimonials from the company’s current and former employees).

In 2021, the company launched a web version. In 2025, the web version is no longer available, the company focuses only on the mobile app.

In September, 2025, happn was acquired by Hello Group, an Asian social and dating app operator.

== Features and use ==
The focus of happn is to match users based on locations where they've crossed paths.

The application is compatible with Android, iPhone, Windows and web browsers. The app uses a feed based upon the location of users' phone, listing possible matches.

== See also ==
- Comparison of online dating services
- Timeline of online dating services
