= The Right Stuff (app) =

Discontinued dating app for American conservatives

The Right Stuff: Dating Right
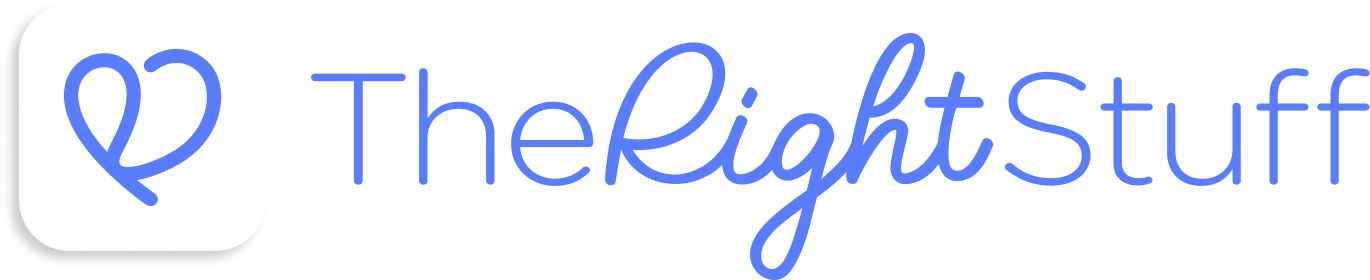
- Original author: John McEntee
- Developers: Right Stuff App, Inc.
- Release: September 30, 2022
- Operating system: iOS and Android
- Website: www.daterightstuff.com

The Right Stuff is a discontinued dating app for American Republicans and conservatives. It was founded by John McEntee, Daniel Huff, and Isaac Stalzer and was funded by Peter Thiel. On Friday, November 21, 2025, users received an in-app message that support for the app was being terminated within 24 hours with developers moving on to other projects. The app is no longer available on the App Store or Play Store, and users are unable to log in anymore.

== History ==
The Right Stuff was founded by John McEntee, Daniel Huff, and Isaac Stalzer. Peter Thiel funded The Right Stuff with a seed round investment of $1.5 million. The New York Times reported in February 2022 that Thiel was funding the app as part of a larger effort to also finance "hard-right" political candidates with Trumpian views (though Thiel would later back away from this strategy).

The Right Stuff was part of a larger trend among conservatives to create alternatives to a media culture they feel is dominated by the political left.

The app was launched on September 30, 2022. The Daily Beast reported that it generated 6,000 and 7,000 downloads in its first two days on the Apple App Store, before falling to 1,000 per day between October 8 and 10.

The app had a number of features intended to weed out internet trolls, such as being invite-only and requiring manual approval of each new user by the company itself. The app also had terms and features that were intended to enforce its political leanings, such as prohibiting mentions of same-sex relationships (despite the app being funded by Thiel, an openly gay man.)

== Marketing ==
Its tagline was "A dating app for the right wing" and "Profiles without Pronouns." A promotional video featuring Ryann McEnany, the sister of former White House press secretary Kayleigh McEnany, was released in August 2022.

== Reception ==
The app received mainly negative reviews from users, with a 2.4 star rating in the Apple App Store as of October 4, 2022. Criticism was directed at the app's invite-only model, a conspicuous absence of female users, and the company's slowness in approving new user profiles.

Some users claimed that after answering a prompt that began "January 6 was..." they were contacted by the FBI. A spokesperson for The Right Stuff told The Independent that it had determined the reports of FBI contact were false, and attributed them to "people trolling".

The app, which marketed itself as a platform for Republican singles, struggled with a low female user base and trolls, and faced criticism over potential data collection issues. The Right Stuff was variously described as "gimmicky", a "hustle", a "flop", and a "grift".

== See also ==
- Comparison of online dating services
- Timeline of online dating services
- Righter (app)
