= Righter (app) =

Conservative dating app

- Developer: Christy Edwards Lawton
- Website: wearerighter.com

Righter was a dating app targeted at American conservatives. It was founded by former banker Christy Edwards Lawton, in order to create a dating app for conservatives who felt rejected by apps like Tinder and Bumble. It is amongst a new wave of apps that notes discrimination against conservatives, including Donald Daters and Conservatives Only.

== Values ==
Christy Edwards Lawton founded Righter in order to fill a void for conservative dating apps. With this, there were many conservative values that she saw as being a priority for the new app.

== See also ==
- Comparison of online dating services
- The Right Stuff (app)
- Tinder
- Conservatism in the United States
