= Bristlr =

Social search mobile app

- Developer: M14 Industries Ltd.
- Initial release: 2014
Stable release
- Android: 2.5.0 / February 5, 2020; 5 years ago
- iOS: 2.5.0 / February 5, 2020; 5 years ago
- Operating system: iOS, Android, Web
- Website: bristlr.com

Bristlr is a location-based social search mobile app that facilitates communication between people with beards, and people who want to stroke beards, allowing matched users to chat.

== Overview ==
Bristlr was founded by John Kershaw in 2014. The app is popular in Canada, the Netherlands, the United Kingdom and the United States.

== Appearance in Dragon's Den ==
John Kershaw, founder of Manchester-based startup M14 Industries, pitched his dating app-building platform on Dragon's Den (season 14 episode 15), seeking £80,000 for 15% equity. Dubbed the “app that connects those with beards to those who want to stroke beards,” Kershaw impressed the Dragons with his confidence and a strong pitch despite having no revenue. All five Dragons made offers, with Peter Jones noting the startup’s deal with UK media giant Global.

After deliberation, Kershaw accepted a joint offer from Nick Jenkins and Peter Jones for £80,000 in exchange for 20% equity, valuing the company at £400,000. However, complications arose when M14 was approached by a major client offering a significantly higher valuation of £1.5 million. This led to renegotiation attempts, which the Dragons declined, resulting in the deal collapsing.

Despite this, Kershaw secured funding of approximately £100,000 from a combination of angel investors and supporters from a previous funding round. Although the unnamed major client chose to remain a customer rather than an investor, the funding round successfully closed in early December. Kershaw also maintained a positive relationship with Jenkins, which later facilitated M14's acquisition of the dating app Double. Both Jenkins and Jones expressed their best wishes for the future success of M14 Industries.

== See also ==
- Comparison of online dating services
- Timeline of online dating services
