= UK Dating Awards =

UK Dating Awards, shortened to the UKDAs, are annual awards given for excellence in the British dating industry. The UKDAs were first conferred in 2014.

The nominations in each category are generated by self-entry. Entries are then shortlisted, and winners voted on by a panel of industry experts. Certain categories are voted for in a public vote.

The Awards are presented at a ceremony at Armoury House in North London. They are supported by the Online Dating Association.

The Awards were created by Charly Lester, a dating blogger, journalist and former Global Head of Dating for Time Out media group. In 2015 Lester announced the creation of complementary US Dating Awards and European Dating Awards, both of which launched in 2016.

== Winners ==
=== 2016 ===
- Best Customer Service - Drawing Down the Moon Matchmaking
- Online Dating Brand of the Year - The Inner Circle
- Daters' Favourite Dating Site - Christian Connection
- Dating App of the Year - Hinge
- Best New Dating Brand - ooOo
- Dating Expert of the Year - Jo Hemmings
- Matchmaking Agency of the Year - Simantov International
- Upcoming Matchmaker of the Year - Soiree Society NI
- Dating Writer of the Year - Stella Grey
- ioSquare Innovation Within the Industry - Good Deed Dating
- Best Dating-Related Marketing Campaign - TrueView
- Scamalytics Safer Dating Award - TrueView
- Best Niche Dating Brand - Christian Connection
- Best Use of Social Media - Lovestruck.com
- Matchmaker Academy Best New Dating Individual - Ane Auret
- Dating Events Brand of the Year - Smudged Lipstick
- Dating Ink Dating Blogger of the Year - Naomi Lewis
- Best Commercial Dating Blog - Cupid.com
- Best Dating TV Show - First Dates
- Founder's Award - George Kidd

=== 2015 ===
- Founder’s Award – For 30 Years Service to the Industry – Mary Balfour, Drawing Down the Moon
- Online Dating Brand of the Year – Lovestruck.com
- Daters’ Favourite Dating Site – Christian Connection
- Dating Writer of the Year – Daisy Buchanan
- Dating Expert of the Year – Susan Quilliam
- Dating Entrepreneur of the Year – Turn Partners
- Best Newcomer Individual – Tara McDonnell
- Blogger of the Year – Jordi Sinclair, 30 Something London
- Best New Dating Site – Bristlr
- Best New Dating App – Clocked
- Matchmaking Agency of the Year – Drawing Down the Moon
- Best Niche Dating Site –Christian Connection
- Best White Label Dating Site – We Love Dates
- Dating Events Brand of the Year – The Inner Circle
- Most Original Dating Event – Playdate
- Innovation in the Dating Industry – TrueView
- Safer Dating – Venntro
- Best Dating-Related Marketing Campaign – Match.com
- Best Commercial Dating Blog – Toyboy Warehouse
- Best Customer Service – Guardian Soulmates

=== 2014 ===
- Dating Website of the Year – Lovestruck.com
- Best Newcomer Dating App – TrueView
- Daters’ Favourite Dating Site – The Guardian Soulmates
- Best Religious Dating Site – Christian Connection
- Dating App of the Year – Lovestruck.com
- Best Newcomer Dating Website – The Inner Circle
- Best Niche Dating Site – Muddy Matches
- Matchmaker of the Year – Caroline Brealey, Mutual Attraction
- Blogger of the Year – Katy Horwood, All Sweetness and Life
- Dating Journalist of the Year – Andy Jones
- Dating Expert of the Year – Jo Hemmings
- Dating Entrepreneur of the Year – Turn Partners
- Best New Dating Individual – Saskia Nelson
- Dating Column of the Year – Tom Craine, Cosmopolitan
- Dating Blog of the Year – All Sweetness and Life
- Best New Dating Blog – Urban Social - UrbanSocial
- Dating TV Show of the Year – First Dates
- Best Magazine for Dating – Cosmopolitan - Cosmopolitan
- Best Dating-Related Marketing Campaign – The Guardian Soulmates
- Safer Dating Award – Scamalytics
- Best London Dating Event – The Inner Circle
- Best Speed Dating Event – Date in a Dash
- Best Food or Drink Event – Table8
- Most Original Dating Event – Loveflutter
- Best Singles Party – Lovestruck.com
- Founder’s Award – Trailblazer of the Year – tinder
