= Daisy Buchanan (writer) =

British writer, journalist and media personality

- Born: 1984/1985
- Education: University of York
- Years active: 2007–present
- Spouse: Dale Shaw (m. 2015)

Daisy Buchanan (born 1984/1985) is the pseudonym of a British columnist, author and podcaster. She began her career as a features writer for the teen magazine Bliss before becoming a freelancer and pop culture commentator. From 2014 to 2021, she had a column in Grazia. She has published a number of non-fiction books and novels, including the bestseller Insatiable (2021).

== Early life ==
Buchanan spent her early childhood in Buckinghamshire before moving to the Dorset coast at age 5. She grew up in a Catholic family. She was severely bullied at school. Buchanan graduated with a Bachelor of Arts (BA) in English literature from the University of York in 2007. During university, she contributed to the student newspaper.

== Career ==
After an internship, Buchanan was invited to join the staff of the teen magazine Bliss as a features writer on the problems page and books editor. Going into freelancing, she adopted the pseudonym Daisy Buchanan so she could write about more adult topics. She contributed to the likes of The Guardian, the Daily Telegraph, the Daily Mirror and was named one of the Huffington Post's 50 Funniest Women.

Buchanan gained prominence through her coverage of the reality series Made in Chelsea through episode recaps in the online magazine Sabotage Times. This coverage formed the basis for Buchanan's debut book The Wickedly Unofficial Guide to Made in Chelsea, published as an e-book in 2012 and being picked up by Sphere Books in 2013.

This was followed by Buchanan's dating book Meeting Your Match: Navigating the minefield of online dating. Buchanan also joined Grazia (and Bauer Media Group's online publication The Debrief) in 2014, where she would start an agony aunt column titled Dear Daisy in October 2015 in addition to contributing pop culture articles. Buchanan won Dating Writer of the Year at the 2015 UK Dating Awards and an inaugural 2016 Words by Women Award in the Lifestyle category. She also had a column in The Pool.

In 2016, Buchanan signed a two-book deal with Headline Publishing Group, through which she published her next non-fiction book How to Be a Grown-Up: You're going to be fine and let me tell you why in 2017. The book was described as part memoir and part self-help guide.

In 2018, Buchanan started the literary podcast You're Booked. You're Booked was a 2021 Times podcast of the week. The second non-fiction book in her deal with Headline was The Sisterhood: A love letter to the women who have shaped us in 2019. The book was inspired by Buchanan's five sisters.

Buchanan reunited with Sphere in 2020 for the publication of her debut novel Insatiable in 2021. Buchanan accompanied the release of Insatiable with a podcast titled Daisy is Insatiable. Insatiable became a BookScan bestseller and was longlisted for the Comedy Women in Print Prize.

This was followed by Buchanan's second and third novels Careering and Limelight in 2022 and 2023 respectively. Also in 2022, Buchanan was commissioned to write Burn Before Reading for the Pound Project. Her fourth novel Pity Party was published in 2024.

In 2024, DK acquired the rights to publish Buchanan's next non-fiction book Read Yourself Happy. Buchanan also signed a two-book deal with Century.

== Personal life ==
Buchanan married comedy writer Dale Shaw at a yacht club in Greenwich in October 2015. The couple settled in Margate. Buchanan is queer.

== Bibliography ==
=== Non-fiction ===
- The Wickedly Unofficial Guide to Made in Chelsea (2012)
- Meeting Your Match: Navigating the minefield of online dating (2014)
- How to Be a Grown-Up: You're going to be fine and let me tell you why (2017)
- The Sisterhood: A love letter to the women who have shaped us (2019)
- Burn Before Reading (2022)
- Read Yourself Happy: How to use books to calm your anxiety (2025)
- Write Yourself Happy (2027)

=== Novels ===
- Insatiable (2021)
- Careering (2022)
- Limelight (2023)
- Pity Party (2024)
- All Grown Up (2026)
- Back For Good (2027)

=== Short stories ===
- in We Need to Talk: Nineteen stories about difficult conversations (2015)
- in 24 Stories of Hope (2019)
