= Ana Kirova =

Bulgarian graphic designer and tech CEO

- Born: 1992 (age 33–34); Varna, Bulgaria
- Citizenship: Bulgarian
- Education: Imperial College Business School (MBA)
- Occupations: Business executive, product & design leader
- Years active: 2014–present
- Known for: CEO of Feeld

Ana Kirova (born 1992) is Bulgarian graphic designer and business executive based in London. She is the chief executive officer of the dating app Feeld.

== Early life and education ==
Kirova was born in Bulgaria in 1992 and raised in Varna. Her father is a neurologist and her mother is in broadcasting. Kirov studied graphic design at London's University of Greenwich.

== Career ==
Before joining Feeld, Kirova worked as a freelance designer in London.

Kirova's bisexuality inspired boyfriend, Dimo Trifonov, to create the app Feeld (originally called 3nder or thrinder). In 2016, she joined the staff as an allrounder with no specific job title. In 2020, she became its Chief Product Officer. The same year, Trifonov stepped down as CEO citing a desire to focus on research and development.

The following year in April 2021, Kirova was appointed Chief Executive Officer of Feeld. The company has 40 odd staff, and approximately half of its leadership team are women. In November 2021, Kirova announced a minimum salary of £60,000 (approximately US $80,000) for all full-time employees. Between 2022 and 2025, Feeld doubled its revenue and the app is available in over 100 countries. In December 2023, she also became a director of the company.

== Personal life ==
Kirova lives in Europe with her partner, Trifonov, Feeld's founder and creative director.

== Awards and honours ==
- Kirova was named to Forbes 30 Under 30 Europe Class of 2022. In 2024, she was named to The Independent's E2E Tech 100 list.

== See also ==
- Feeld
