= Lovestruck (disambiguation) =

Lovestruck means having mental and physical symptoms associated with falling in love.

Lovestruck or Love Struck may also refer to:

== Music ==
- "Love Struck", a 2009 song by V Factory
- "Love Struck" (WSTRN song), a 2018 song by WSTRN
- "Love Struck", a 1988 song by Jesse Johnson
- "Lovestruck" (Madness song), a 1999 song by Madness
- "Lovestruck" (Duffy song), from the 2010 album Endlessly
- Lovestruck!, a 2023 EP by Kep1er

== Other uses ==
- Ishqiya, or Lovestruck, a 2010 Indian black comedy film by Abhishek Chaubey
- Lovestruck, a 2005 Filipino film
- Lovestruck: The Musical, a 2013 American musical
- Lovestruck.com, an online dating site
- Love-Struck, a 1997 original film by the Freeform cable network
