= Spray Network =

Swedish Internet company

Spray Network AB is a Swedish Internet company that runs the web portal spray.se. Spray was founded in 1995, was bought by Lycos Europe, but was sold to Allers in 2006. As of 2006 spray.se has about 750 000 visitors per week.

In 2004 Spray bought the Swedish Internet service business from Tiscali. The telecom subsidiary, Spray Telekom was later sold to Glocalnet in 2007.

It is the owner of Spray Date.
