= Joseph Phua =

Singaporean entrepreneur

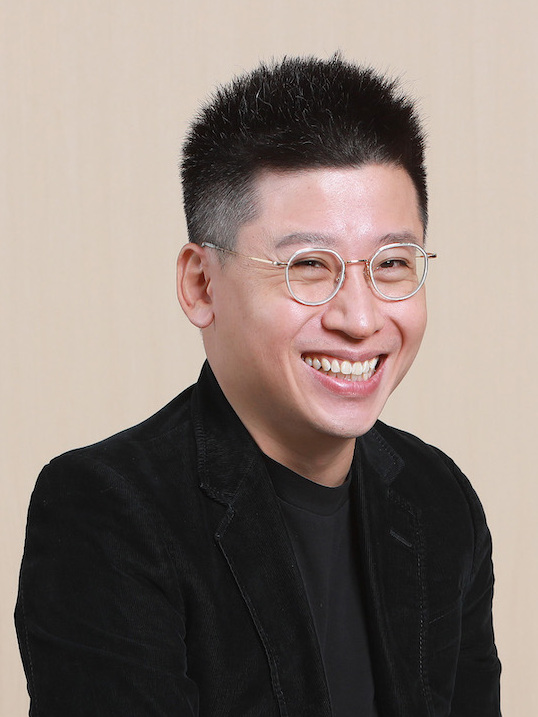
- Born: Singapore
- Education: Bachelor of Finance from New York University Stern School of Business, Master of Business Administration from University of Chicago Booth School of Business
- Occupations: Chairman of Turn Capital; Co-founder and Chairman of 17LIVE Group; Chairman of SoundOn Group; Founder of Nextapple News
- Known for: Chairman of Turn Capital

Joseph Phua is a Singaporean-Taiwanese entrepreneur. He is the co-founder of the dating app Paktor and co-founder and chairman of the live streaming platform 17LIVE Group. He is also the founder of Next Apple News and chairman of the single family office Turn Capital.

== Education ==
Phua attended Stern School of Business, New York University, majoring in Finance for his undergraduate degree. He obtained a master's degree in Business Administration from Booth School of Business, University of Chicago. After graduation, he worked at McKinsey & Company and Citibank.

== Career ==
Phua is the founder of Paktor, a mobile dating app targeting Asia markets he launched in 2014. He was inspired by the dating app Tinder that he used while attending the University of Chicago in 2012.

In 2017, Phua merged Paktor with 17 Media, a live streaming platform founded by Jeffrey Huang, to form M17 Entertainment. After the merger, Phua became the CEO of M17 Entertainment. In 2020, he resigned as the CEO and assumed the role of chairman and the group was renamed 17LIVE Group. Phua is said to be 17LIVE's largest individual shareholder after the company went public on the Singapore Stock Exchange in 2023. In 2019, Phua was selected by Asian fashion media Tatler as a Generation T (Gen.T) award recipient.

In 2021, Phua's family investment office, Turn Capital, acquired the podcast platform SoundOn and merged it with the voice social service Goodnight. The same year, he also acquired Dapp Pocket and Cappuu of a Taiwanese blockchain company. The two companies, Dapp Pocket and Cappuu, were later merged into a retail blockchain finance platform Coinomo.

In September 2022, Phua founded Next Apple News, an independent news platform in Taiwan. In December 2024 it was announced that Turnsport had made a financial association with Kings Lynn Football Club who play in the National League North, the 7th tier of England's Football pyramid.

== Philanthropy ==
In 2021, Phua announced the establishment of the Phua and Chang Family Scholarship, a University of Chicago Booth School of Business endowment. The scholarship was first awarded to a student from Taiwan.

== Personal life ==
Phua has one child with his wife, whom he met through the Paktor app.
