= DOWN (app) =

American social networking and online dating app

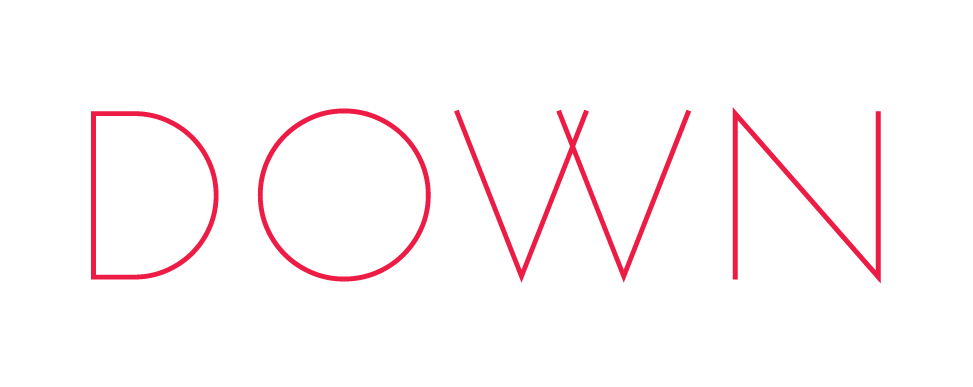
- Official logo used in 2021
- Website type: Online dating application
- Founded: 2013; 13 years ago
- Area served: Global
- Founders: Colin Hodge; Omri Mor
- Industry: Software, Dating
- Website: downapp.com
- Launched: January 23, 2013; 13 years ago

DOWN is a location-based social networking and online dating application for users looking for casual relationships and hookups.

Founded in 2013 as Bang with Friends, the app began as a Facebook web app for curious singles to find which of their Facebook friends were interested in "banging," or casual sex. After lawsuits from Zynga, the developer of popular games like Words with Friends, Bang with Friends changed its name to DOWN in late 2013.

== History ==
=== Bang With Friends ===
Bang with Friends was launched by Colin Hodge and Omri Mor after meeting at Boost VC, a venture capital tech incubator in San Mateo, California. After working on HeardAboutYou, an app billed as Linkedin for lovers, Hodge looked for a way to simplify the online dating process for users who were looking for something casual.

In just the first few weeks after launch in January 2013, Bang with Friends picked up coverage first from the niche entertainment site, BroBible, and then went viral with stories in BuzzFeed, the Daily Mail, The Daily Beast, and even the Colbert Report.

For the first few months, the startup continued to spark discussion and attention from the press, keeping their identities anonymous. While there was speculation about the identity of the founders, they granted interviews anonymously, identifying only as "C" or other letters. After founder Colin Hodge's identity was revealed in promotional material for New York's 2013 Internet Week, Gawker landed Hodge's first public interview.

User tutorial screenshot demonstrating swiping method

In the first year, Bang With Friends raised $1 million from investors, including Boost VC, Tim Draper, and Great Oaks Venture Capital.

Bang With Friends reached 1 million users within three months of launch. With the surge of registrations and press attention, the Bang With Friends app gained even more headlines with a guerilla marketing campaign at the March, 2013 South by Southwest Festival. The company launched a SXSW-specific hookup website, "Bang with SXSW", and plastered the festival's walls with raunchy advertisements. SXSW organizers tore the posters down, drawing more press coverage and fueling the controversy.

Starting as a simple Facebook web app in January 2013, the mobile app version of DOWN launched on the Apple App Store and Google Play Store in May 2013. Within weeks, the app was suddenly removed by Apple from the App Store. By August 2013, the app was back up under its new rebranded name, "DOWN".

=== Lawsuits and rebrand ===
Midway through 2013, Bang With Friends was sued by Zynga, the social network game maker who owned Words With Friends. Zynga claimed the trademark rights to the phrase "With Friends," threatening a lawsuit against Bang With Friends. The companies decided to settle out of court under undisclosed terms and Bang with Friends rebranded to DOWN in late 2013. The new name of the company is a reference to the casual American slang definition of "down," as used in the phrases "down to fuck" or to "get down," and was Hodge's way of moving the company away from "alienating people who may not want an app that says "bang" but are totally down otherwise."

Along with the rebrand, they updated the dating app to remove the limit on connecting with Facebook friends and expanded users' reach to friends-of-friends.

At SXSW in 2014, DOWN co-founder & CEO Colin Hodge returned, this time invited, and headlined a discussion with Grindr founder and CEO Joel Simkhai titled "SXSW: From Stranger to Lover in One Swipe." The pair discussed the impact of social technology, the evolution of mobile dating, and how creating apps like Grindr and DOWN changed their own dating lives.

=== Continuation as DOWN ===
In 2016, after organically growing to 5 million users, DOWN was acquired by a Singaporean tech company named Paktor. During 2017, DOWN disclosed it made $1 million in annual revenue from in-app purchases. As part of Paktor, DOWN eventually was rolled into M17 Entertainment in the merger between Paktor and 17LIVE, one of the world's top livestreaming companies.

In 2018, the company was sold by M17 Entertainment, reverting ownership of the company to Hodge and an original team member.
