= 17LIVE =

Social entertainment platform

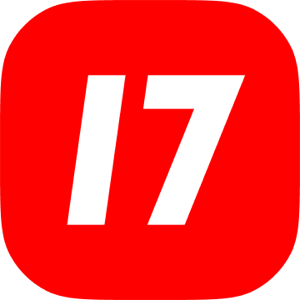
- Formerly: 17LIVE Entertainment
- Type: Public
- Traded as: SGX: VT1.SI
- Industry: Live Entertainment
- Founded: June 2015
- Founder: Jeffery Huang (Exited), Joseph Phua (Chairman)
- Area served: Worldwide; Offices in Japan, Taiwan, US, Hong Kong, India / ME
- Key people: Alex Lien (Group CEO), Jing Shen Ng (Group CTO), Kenta Masuda (Group CFO)
- Brands: 17LIVE, Meme, Wave, HandsUp
- Website: about.17.live

17LIVE is an international entertainment platform. As of 2024, 17LIVE is the #3 live broadcasting platform globally, formed by its flagship live stream app 17LIVE (LIVIT in English markets), MEME Live and live stream e-commerce platforms HandsUP and OrderPally.

== History ==
17LIVE was first founded in Taiwan in 2015 by Jeffery Huang. The company has maintained its leading position since its entry into the Japan market in 2017, becoming the biggest platform for live entertainment in Japan, Taiwan, Hong Kong, and other countries.

In 2017, 17 closed out US$33M in series B round to merge with dating software Paktor, with Joseph Phua (Co-founder of Paktor) taking over the leadership of 17LIVE as CEO and Co-founder, as well as to enter the Japan and Hong Kong market. Within one year, 17 Media became the #1 market leader in Japan.

In 2018, the company raised $25M in series C round as it got ready for US IPO, which failed to materialize. 17LIVE had an unsuccessful US IPO attempt in 2018. Since then, the company reformed and transformed the business. Some key initiatives include the hiring of current CEO Hirofumi Ono, spin-off of Paktor (dating software business unit), full buy-out of founder Jeffery Huang, acquisition of MEME and HandsUp, and more. Despite the failed IPO attempt, the company continued to push for international expansion, including creating ‘LIVIT’ for the English-speaking markets to enter US, India, and North Africa.

In 2019, 17's flagship live streaming app reached 10M downloads in Japan, and the business continues to push for both organic and inorganic expansion. Some key M&A highlights in the year include the acquisition of MEME Live in Southeast Asia, as well as HandsUp, a live e-commerce platform.

In 2020, M17 closed out $26.5M in Series D round to continue organic growth in Japan, US and Middle East. In the same year, the company also sold its dating app business, Parktor, to rationalise M17 into a live-stream pure play business, followed by the appointment of its current Chairman, Joseph Phua, and previous Global CEO, Hirofumi Ono. With the buy-out and departure of founder Jeff Huang, the parent holding company M17 Entertainment Limited was officially renamed as 17 LIVE Group. An estimated 60 million users registered in 154 countries and territories in April 2022.

In 2022, September, 17LIVE announced Group CEO Hirofumi Ono steps down. Alex Lien takes over the leadership as new Group COO; Jing Shen Ng appointed Group CTO.

In 2023, March, 17LIVE announced Alex Lien promoted to Global CEO. Kenta Masuda appointed as Global CFO.

=== Collaboration with Ayumi Hamasaki ===
To celebrate its 4th anniversary, 17LIVE collaborated with Japanese singer-songwriter Ayumi Hamasaki, who led the 17LIVE 4th Anniversary meets Ayumi Hamasaki series starting October 18, 2021. Along with composer and arranger Yuta Nakano, Hamasaki judged auditioning artists competing for the chance to work with her and her production team for a debut single. The series was streamed live on the 17LIVE website, the final airing on November 11. The eventual winner was named as Yoshitaka_song.

When asked why she collaborated with 17LIVE as a producer, Hamasaki commented: "Although the world has become like this (during COVID-19), I believe that the art of entertainment can give people dreams, hope, courage, and strength. I hope that kind of light will continue to shine through the entertainment industry."

== Features ==
On 17LIVE, artists (LIVERs) are able to broadcast live, and post photos and videos from their album. The app has been designed for LIVERs to simply open the App, and start sharing contents without the need to edit or professionally curate their videos.

The platform cultivates LIVERs, supports them with a local content management team, and provides artists with various functions, such as real time chatting, gifting, fan clubs, interactive competition and events.

Today, 17LIVE has 46 thousands contracted artists and more than 2.3 million MAU, who spend 44 minutes on the platform every day. 17LIVE continues to advocate content-driven philosophy and delivers diverse topics, from politics and music to entertainment, to broaden its audience groups. 17LIVE also hosts offline flash events and concerts to attract new users and support LIVERs better connect with their fans.

== Operation ==
17LIVE has over 700 employees globally.

The app provides few monetization models for LIVERs on the platform, including:

- Gifting: user / fans buy virtual gifts on the app to send to their favored LIVERs.
- Subscription: monthly subscription fan club service for access to exclusive content
- Pay-per-view: ticket service for online streaming concerts
- E-commerce: live e-commerce platform

In the past, 17LIVE has encountered some regulatory headwinds with reported incidents of inappropriate livestream content on the platform. The incidents were direct results of the lack of oversight and supervision capability in place in the business at the time. Over the years, 17LIVE claims to have put in tremendous manpower and effort into improving, monitoring and maintaining control over both the live stream content and the KYC procedures and systems.
