= Jim Safka =

- Born: May 7, 1968 (age 58); Elmhurst, Illinois, U.S.
- Occupation: Business executive
- Spouse: Mandy Montoya (m. 1996; div. 2014)
- Children: 2

James Patrick Safka (born 7 May 1968) is an American digital media executive and former chief executive officer of Match.com and Ask.com.

== Biography ==
=== Career at Match.com ===
At Match.com, an online dating service with more than 20 million members, Safka was CEO from August 2004 to June 2007.

Four months after Safka took over, Match.com paid subscriptions had increased by 10%, and by early 2005 the number of subscribers topped one million. Under each year of Safka's leadership, Match.com's business grew more than 20%. In 2006, he sought Dr. Phil McGraw, the well-known television psychologist and "America's relationship authority" to join forces with Match.com – Dr. Phil's first affiliation with a major national brand. Safka situated Dr. Phil in Match.com's multimillion-dollar national television campaign. Dr. Phil also developed an innovative relationship counseling product, available exclusively through Match.com, based on Dr. Phil's tough-love approach. Safka's partnership with Dr. Phil ultimately contributed to the brand's demise as younger generations left the service.

Safka was responsible for targeted marketing to key online dating subgroups, specifically baby boomers. This approach accelerated both the brand's market penetration and its share success. Safka's insight into differing cultural norms and their ultimate effect on what individuals expect from a relationship caused international expansion of Match.com, where the company achieved local dominance through marketing, advertising, and product strategies.

=== Career at Ask.com ===
Safka was CEO for Ask.com (a division of IAC search & Media Inc) from January 2008 to May 2009. During Safka's tenure, the Ask Network became the 6th ranked U.S. internet property; its highest ranking ever. Safka led key strategic marketing and product initiatives, enhancing Ask's position in the hotly competitive search category. He re-focused the brand on its question-and-answer origin and launched an aggressive effort that added more than 300 million "question and answer" pairs to the site. Leveraging the "wisdom of crowds" theory, many of these pairs came from everyday internet users. Safka further expanded the company's leadership in question-and-answers with Ask.com's acquisition of Dictionary.com.

Safka also launched a marketing and advertising strategy leveraging NASCAR—one of the first campaigns of its kind. Tom Garfinkel reflected on the achievement in Sports Business Daily,"It worked because their team was nimble, it worked because of Jim's courage, it worked because there was no competition in this space from Ask's category. The timing was perfect. We told them that if they came in, they'd be the story. And they have been the story."

For the Ask.com UK operation, Safka re-introduced the Jeeves character – the brand was initially called "Ask Jeeves", although the company had chosen to cease using the beloved butler in 2007. The British market enthusiastically greeted Jeeves' return, and Ask.com received significant press attention.

=== Previous work ===
In 2011, Safka co-founded the social dating service Atzip, a mobile application for the iPhone. Safka was CEO of Vinfolio, an online marketplace for fine wine, through October 2013. Mr. Safka served on the Board of Directors of SpeedDate.com until its acquisition by Match.com and is an advisor to the social media marketing Company Talenthouse. In 2009, Safka launched a new website for Hall of Fame baseball player Reggie Jackson. This endeavor led to a relationship with Willie Mays, and Safka collaborated with Mr. Mays to reclaim the williemays.com domain. In January 2010, Safka was appointed by NASCAR to chair the NASCAR Interactive Media Council.

=== Most recent work ===
Safka consults and provides interim leadership for a select list of startups, small and large enterprise companies, and private equity and venture capital firms. Safka coaches basketball for Hillview Middle School and Lacrosse for the Menlo-Atherton Grizzlies. In January 2016, Safka was appointed Volunteer Police Officer for the Menlo Park Police Department. In July 2015, Safka launched Electric Skateboard Reviews with his son Quinn Safka.

=== Early career ===
From 1997 to 2002, Safka worked in product management and marketing roles at E-Trade, where he helped develop the site's "Destination E*TRADE" services to empower the individual investor.

Safka also worked for Intuit (PM for Quicken.com, 1995–1997), Alberto-Culver, Inc (Asst Brand Manager 1994), Warner Bros, Inc (development assistant 1991-1993), Paramount Pictures. and Chegg.

At Alberto-Culver, his career nearly ended prematurely due to an ill-fated joint promotion with the Potato Growers of Idaho that involved a spurious Universal Product Code. Safka has said that this debacle instilled an obsession with checking details and an enduring fear of anything with black-and-white parallel stripes.

== Personal life and education ==
Born in Elmhurst, Illinois and raised in Seattle, Washington, Safka received his bachelor's degree from the University of Southern California Leventhal School of Accounting in 1990, where he was recognized as one of only 11 Accounting Scholars. Mr. Safka also had extensive studies in Cinema-Television Production. He earned his master's degree (1994) in Business Administration from the Kellogg School of Management at Northwestern University. In 1996, Safka married Mandy Montoya. Safka filed for divorce in 2014. Safka has two children, Quinn and Tallulah. He also has a niece, Annabel Safka. Safka lives in Menlo Park, California.
