= Timeline of online dating =

This timeline of online dating also includes broader events related to technology-assisted dating (not just online dating). Where there are similar services, only major ones or the first of its kind are listed.

Year (month and date)	Event	Venue
1956-1957	Art Linkletter, host of People Are Funny, had a computer dating segment during the 1956-1957 season: "a couple matched by a Univac computer became acquainted while answering questions in a quiz-show format."	
1959	Happy Families Planning Service launches. Started by Jim Harvey and Phil Fialer as a class project at Stanford. Used a questionnaire and an IBM 650 to match 49 men and 49 women.	
1963	Ed Lewis at Iowa State University uses a questionnaire and an IBM computer "to optimize the meeting potential at dances".	
1964	St. James Computer Dating Service (later to become Com-Pat) launches. Joan Ball started the first commercially run computer generated matchmaking company. The first set of matchups was run in 1964.	
1965	Operation Match (part of Compatibility Research Inc.) launches. Started by Jeff Tarr and Vaughan Morrill at Harvard. Used a questionnaire and an IBM 1401 to match students. There was a $3 fee for submitting a questionnaire. "By the fall of sixty-five, six months after the launch, some ninety thousand Operation Match questionnaires had been received, amounting to $270,000 in gross profits, about $1.8 million in [2014]'s dollars." In the 1960s there still was no stigma about computer-assisted matching.	
1965	Contact launches. Started by David Dewan at MIT. Used a dating questionnaire and Honeywell 200. "In one distribution of questionnaires, he drew eleven thousand responses at $4 each, or $44,000 in gross profits, about $250,000 in [2014]'s dollars."	
1965	The New York Review of Books personals column makes a comeback. Slater writes: Classifieds made a comeback in America in the 1960s and 1970s, encouraged by the era's inclination toward individualism and social exhibitionism. "Everybody was letting it all hang out in other ways," said Raymond Shapiro, a business manager for the New York Review of Books, "so suddenly it was okay to display oneself in print. It was very important to be 'self-aware.' So you'd get ads like: 'Astrologer, 27, psychology student, desires to establish non-superficial friendship with sensitive, choicelessly aware persons who are non-self-oriented, deep, and wish to unearth real personness relationships.'"	Magazine
1968	Data-Mate launches. Questionnaire-based matching service started at MIT.	
1970s, early	Phase II is founded. A "computer-dating company" started by James Schur.	
1974	Cherry Blossoms' mail-order bride catalog launches. Slater calls Cherry Blossoms "one of the oldest mail-order bride agencies". Started by John Broussard.	
1976	Great Expectations is founded. Video dating service started by Jeffrey Ullman. The service achieved some notability, but it never overcame stigma. There were also apparently other video dating services like Teledate and Introvision, but it's nearly impossible to find anything about them online.	
1980s	messageries roses (pink chat rooms) launches chat rooms for dating (using the Minitel network) started by Marc Simoncini. France.	
1982	Jens Jürgen founded Travel Companion Exchange, the first travel partner matching service.	
1986	Matchmaker Electronic Pen-Pal Network launches. A bulletin board system for romance started by Jon Boede and Scott Smith. Matchmaker grew to 14 local BBSs throughout the US. Eventually people lost interest as BBSs lost out to the World Wide Web, and Matchmaker was superseded by Matchmaker.com.	
1987	TelePersonals is created as a separate telephone dating system in Toronto, Canada from an earlier "Personals" dating section of a telephone classified business. As part of an advertising program a selection of ads appear on the back pages of Now Magazine, the Canadian equivalent of the Village Voice. Services in different cities around the Toronto area are launched. A gay option is quickly added. The gay section becomes its own branded service. At the very beginning of the 2000s TelePersonals launches online and is rebranded as Lava Life with sections for cities across the United States and Canada.	Telephone, later Web
1989	Scanna International launches. Mail-order bride service focusing on Russia and Eastern Europe.	
1994	Kiss.com launches. The first modern dating website.	
1995	Yid.com launched as the first Jewish dating service and the first dating site in South Africa.	Web
1995	Match.com launches. Started by Gary Kremen.	
1997	Yahoo Personals launches. Popular online dating service offered in the Yahoo suite of apps. Began offering a premier subscription in 2004. International growth in the 2000s. Despite initial popularity, shuts down in 2010.	
1997	JDate launches dating service targeted at Jewish singles	
1997	Shaadi.com launches. It is an online wedding service founded by Anupam Mittal in 1997. October 1998, Sanjeev Bikhchandani, founder and executive vice chairman of Info Edge India, started the matrimonial website	
1998	Jeevansathi.com launches. October 1998, Sanjeev Bikhchandani, founder and executive vice chairman of Info Edge India, started the matrimonial website.	
1999	Gaydar launches. Founded in November 1999 by London-based South Africans Gary Frisch and his partner Henry Badenhorst, the website was once the world's most popular gay online dating site it grew into a portfolio of websites and an award-winning radio station.	Web later App
2000	eHarmony launches. Online dating service for long-term relationships.	
2000	BharatMatrimony launches. Murugavel Janakiraman started the BharatMatrimony website in 2000[7] while working as a software consultant for Lucent Technologies in Edison, N.J. In the late 1990s he set up a Tamil community web portal, which included matrimonial ads. He started BharatMatrimony after noticing the matrimonial ads generated most of his web traffic	
2001	Christian Mingle launches dating service for Christian singles	
2002	Friendster is launched. A friendship, dating and early general Social networking website all rolled into one. In 2005 Facebook copies and expands the idea into a general social interconnected website.	Web
2002	PlanetRomeo is launched as GayRomeo in October 2002 initially only available in German but now available in 6 languages. The majority of the sites users are based in Europe.	Web later App
2002	Dudesnude is launched as a networking site for gay men. The company slogan is "picture, video, and profile sharing for men!"	Web
2002	Ashley Madison is launched as a networking service for extramarital relationships.	
2002	PrimeSingles.net launches as a dating service for singles over 50. This name changes to Single Seniors Meet in 2009 and to SilverSingles in 2011	
2003	Proxidating launches. Dating service that used Bluetooth to "alert users when a person with a matching profile was within fifty feet".	
2003	PlentyOfFish launches.	Web
2004	OkCupid launches.	Web
2006	Spark Networks, owner of niche dating sites like Jdate and Christian Mingle, goes public.	
2006	Badoo launches as a dating-focused social networking service	
2006	SeekingArrangement launches. A sugar daddy/sugar baby site in the US.	
2006	MeetMoi launches the first location based dating application	Web later App
2007	Skout launches. A "location-based social networking and dating application and website".	
2007	ScientificMatch.com launches, claiming to match people with complementary immune systems.	
2007	Crazy Blind Date launches. Blind dating service started by Sam Yagan.	
2007	Zoosk launches. A global online-dating service started by Shayan Zadeh and Alex Mehr.	
2008	GenePartner launches matching service based on "DNA compatibility".	
2009	Grindr launches, focusing on gay, bi and trans people.	App
2009	VIDA Select launches, online matchmaking platform using virtual assistants.	
2010	Scruff launches, focussing on gay, bisexual, and transgender men, adding in 2013 a HIV-positive community.	App
2011	LikeBright launches. Online dating site by Nick Soman. By 2014 the site shut down.	Web
2011	Dating group Spark Networks acquires Senior Singles Meet (formerly PrimeSingles) and changes the name to SilverSingles	
2011 (July)	Momo, a Chinese social search and instant messaging app launches.	
2011 (September)	Blendr, designed to connect like-minded people, launches.	
2012(?)	Highlight launches. Slater calls it a "location-based dating app".	App
2012	Tinder launches.	App
2012	Hinge launches, an app 'designed to be deleted'	App
2013	Dattch launches on the App Store as first lesbian and bisexual dating app for queer women, nonbinary and trans people	
2013	Pure launches on the App Store	App
2014 (Passover)	JSwipe launches. A dating app for Jewish millennials.	App
2014	Bristlr launches, facilitating communication between bearded men and women who love beards.	
2014 (July)	3nder starts facilitating communication between people interested in polyamory, kink, swinging, and other alternative sexual preferences.	
2014 (September)	Spoonr starts facilitating communication between strangers who live within walking distance from each other.	
2014 (December)	Bumble launches, a location-based mobile app that permits only women to start a chat with their matches.	
2015	HER launches as the rebrand of Dattch	
2015	Personal information of Ashley Madison users stolen and released.	
2015	Huggle starts connecting users based on commonality of places they frequent.	
2015	Yellow, a Tinder for teens, launches in France and in 2017 in the US.	
2015	Jdate owners Spark Networks Inc buy JSwipe from Smooch Labs.	
2015 (November 19)	Match Group, which owns and operates several online dating web sites including OkCupid, Tinder, PlentyOfFish, and Match.com, goes public.	
2016	3nder is rebranded Feeld	
2017 (August)	Hily is an online dating application that matches users by analyzing users' backgrounds, interests, and app activity.	App
2017	Affinitas GmbH (owner of dating websites like EliteSingles and eDarling) merges with Spark Networks, Inc, (owner of dating websites like Christian Mingle, Jdate, and SilverSingles) to create Spark Networks SE	
2018	Sniffies, a map-based hookup web app for gay, bisexual, and bicurious men, is launched.	
2019	Lex, a text-based and location-based, app for LGBTQ+ users launches.	
2019	Spark Networks SE acquires Zoosk, forming North America's second-largest dating company in revenues.	
2019	Facebook Dating launches in the USA.	App
2020	Spark dating app launches in Canada with a focus on creative matchmaking	App
2023 (July)	Duolicious launches. A free and open-source dating app, originally posted anonymously to 4chan's /soc/ board. It went viral in May 2024, briefly outranking established services including eHarmony in Google Play's free dating category.	App, Web
2025	GoodDate launches as a free, nonprofit dating service built on values, transparency and genuine connection. The platform is operated by a nonprofit organisation.	Web

== Dominance of online dating ==
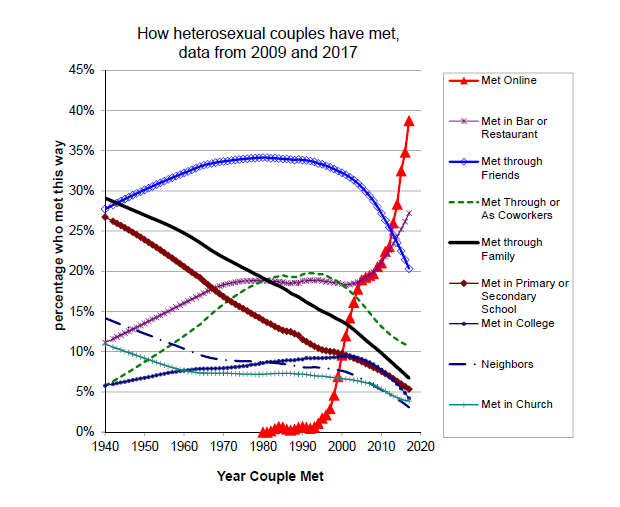
The continued rise of meeting online for heterosexual couples in the U.S.

A 2017 survey by Michael J. Rosenfeld, updated in 2021, tracked the change in how Americans meet their spouses and romantic partners since 1940. The results indicated a significant increase in the proportion of couples whose first interaction occurred through online media, with 39% of heterosexual couples and 65% of same-sex couples meeting this way as of 2021. However, these broad statistics are mutually inclusive, capturing all online interactions and not solely those initiated through dating apps. When the data is refined to 'meeting through dating apps,' the percentage narrows to approximately 10%.

A Pew Research study corroborated these findings, reporting that 28% of straight and 52% of LGB Americans have used dating apps or sites. Yet, only 9% of straight adults and 24% of LGB adults reported meeting their match online. Similar trends were noted in a 2021 study by Morning Consult, which showed that the percentage of individuals who met their partners through online dating increased from 10% in 2018 to 13% in 2021, potentially influenced by the Covid-19 pandemic. A multinational study by YouGov also revealed that the average percentage of couples meeting through an app across 17 countries was 8%, with the U.S. standing at the same rate.

In summary, while a substantial 49% of adults using dating apps claim to be searching for exclusive romantic relationships, the actual formation of such relationships through dating apps is considerably lower. Only 8-13% of straight couples and 24% of lesbian, gay, or bisexual couples meet through these platforms.

== See also ==
- Comparison of online dating services
