= Male submission =

Sexual activities with male submissive partner

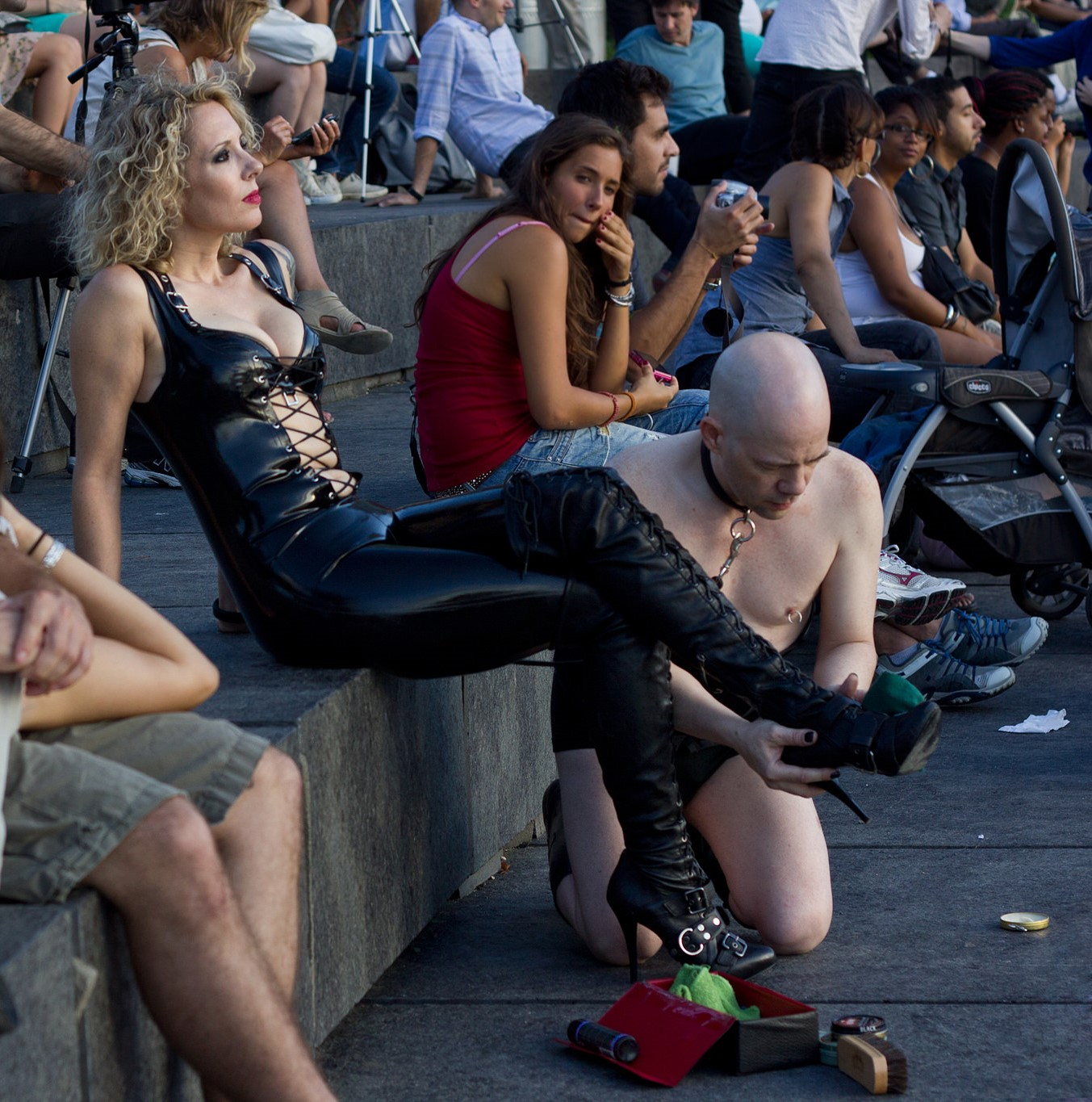
A male slave publicly serving a mistress in New York City

Male submission or malesub is a situation in BDSM and other sexual activities in which the submissive partner is male. Studies suggest that between 26%-46% of men who are active in BDSM prefer a submissive role.

Male submission in BDSM can take many different forms and include a variety of activities, including cock and ball torture, forced feminization, chastity, cuckoldry, erotic humiliation, facesitting, golden showers, pegging, foot fetishism, and clothed female, naked male. During the 18th century, some European brothels began specializing in restraint, and flagellation, as well as other activities which involved female domination and male submission.

== Prevalence and research ==
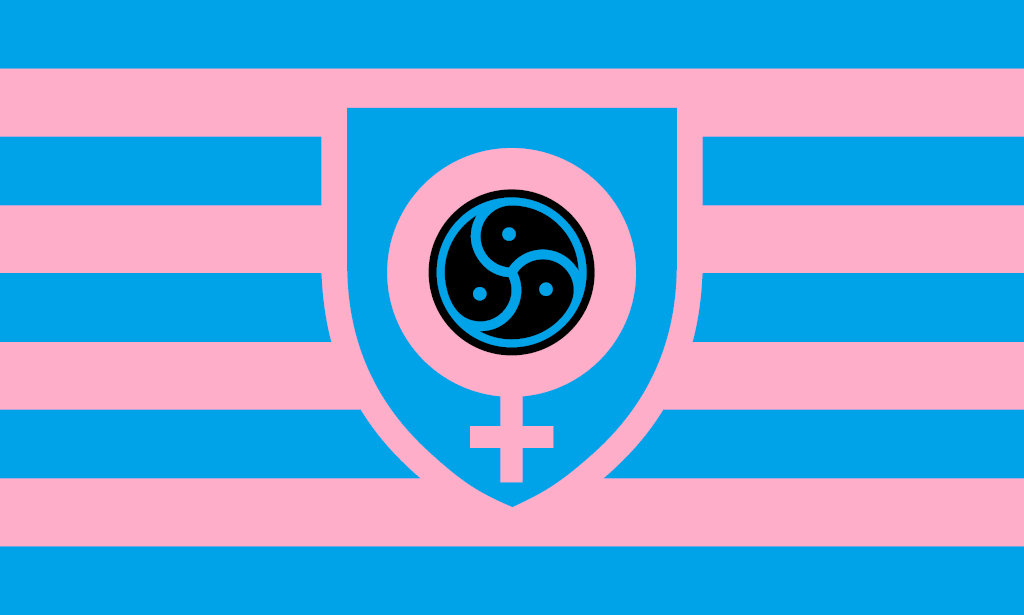
Femdom flag in the Leather subculture

=== In BDSM ===
A 2008 survey of BDSM practitioners in California found that 26% of male respondents preferred submissive roles, while a later 2013 study from the Netherlands found that 33% of men who participated in BDSM were primarily submissive. Andrea Duarte Silva's 2015 thesis at the University of Oslo found that 46.6% of men included in the study were mainly submissive, with 24% being switches and 29.5% being dominant. Silva also found that men were more likely to enjoy pain as a pleasure enhancer during BDSM, and also found that maleness is correlated with pain as a submission enhancer.

A dominant female with her male pet submissive at Folsom Street Fair 2010

=== In general population ===
A Czech study in 2007 found that about 13.8% of men in the general population would prefer the submissive role in sex. A similar 2018 study with a smaller sample size found that number to be 6.1%.

== See also ==
- Chastity belt (BDSM)
- Dominance and submission
- Erotic spanking
- Female-led relationship
- Female submission
- Financial domination
- Male dominance (BDSM)
