= True (dating service) =

True (originally known as TrueBeginnings) was an online dating service that was active from 2003 to 2013. It was founded by entrepreneur Herb Vest and was based in Irving, Texas.

The company conducted a criminal background check and marital screenings for all of its communicating members. In May 2007 the site reportedly had 16 million registered users with 3.8 million unique visits to the site per month.

== Advertising ==
An example of one of True's online ads.

True advertised aggressively online and spent $52.2 million in online advertising from January to November 2006, more than any other online dating service. True's ads vary in theme and often feature provocatively dressed women with sex-themed taglines such as "It's nice to be naughty." These ads were particularly prevalent on MySpace. Partly because of its ad campaign, True became, in only four years since its founding, one of the most visited sites in the online dating industry, according to The New York Times.

On September 14, 2007, the New York Times' "Bits" blog reported that an executive at a major Internet company said that True is delinquent on its advertising payments on his and other websites and has had to cut back on advertising as a result. On April 1, 2007, LiveJournal parodied the True ad campaign on their website. In 2008 they boosted marketing spending 70 percent to $75 million.

== Lobbying efforts ==
True has lobbied state lawmakers in favor of legislation requiring online dating services to disclose whether or not they conduct background checks.

== Points of difference ==
True is known for requiring criminal background and marital screenings for all of its communicating members. True will cancel the account of anyone found to be married, separated or having a pending divorce without warning, and also reports them to the Internet Crime Complaint Center (IC3). Convicted felons will not only have their accounts canceled, but are reported to the IC3 and to local authorities.

The company has filed lawsuits against individuals for misrepresenting themselves on its site, under the premise that doing so is wire fraud. Most notably, it sued Robert Wells, a 66-year-old convicted felon and child molester from Walnut Creek, California. He had been able to avoid detection because California doesn't provide criminal data to businesses. Another True member discovered Wells' criminal history and alerted the company. Wells and True reached a settlement in which Wells agreed to pay monetary damages to True, perform community service and never use an online dating service again. The most recent lawsuit was filed in March 2007 against a convicted felon and registered sex offender from Florida who attempted to communicate with its members.

== Criticism ==
Blogger David Evans is quoted in The New York Times as saying True's competitors were upset with True's sex-themed ad campaign, saying that "they worked hard to overcome the stigma of providing these services, [a]nd True comes in, grabs the lead in page views and drives up the cost of dating keywords on the search engines for everyone else."

The New York Times and Online Dating Magazine have noted examples of customers having frustrating experiences trying to cancel their service, including the service failing to honor their cancellation request and charging them for several more months.

True employed an optional, automatic "wink" to its members which seemed to come from other members, without the latter's knowledge. The feature could be disabled at any time, and True maintained that this feature encouraged communication between members. It was the subject of controversy, as members had no way of knowing whether the wink was automatic or manual, and thus created confusion. Some people asked in their profiles not to be winked at for this exact reason.

A lawsuit seeking class action status was filed against True.com in 2007 alleging fraudulent billing practices, particularly charging members after they have cancelled their service. The lawsuit was settled in 2009.

During bankruptcy proceedings in 2013, the company tried to sell its customer database, but the sale was stopped by the courts.

== Lay offs ==
According to Dallas CEO, "True ran into early financial troubles, which included layoffs in 2004, about the same time Match.com cut its own workforce." True has had two more rounds of layoffs since 2004. In 2013, the domain was sold to TrueCar.com.

== See also ==
- List of online dating websites
