= Spoonr =

Social meeting app (2015–2017) was "Cuddlr" (2014–15)

- Operating system: iOS, Android
- Type: Social discovery
- Website: www.spoonr.com

Spoonr (formerly Cuddlr) was a social-meeting application where strangers who lived within walking distance from each other could meet up for casual, platonic cuddling.

== Overview ==
Users could send nearby prospective cuddle partners an invitation to cuddle, which the fellow users could either choose to accept or decline within 60 minutes. The application provided real-time walking directions to cuddle partners, allowing them to meet up, either in a private or public setting. It was claimed the Tinder of cuddling. Unlike Tinder, the age of all users (and, potentially, gender) was omitted. Additionally, users were rated by previous cuddle partners according to their cuddling techniques and spooning preferences, their communication skills, and their ability to respect boundaries. These ratings, which acted as a safety measure, were then made available to all Spoonr users.

== History ==
Spoonr was launched as Cuddlr on September 18, 2014. The app was co-founded by Charlie Williams, an American who now lives and operates out of England. Williams, a software engineer and founder of Charlie Roberts Williams Ltd., previously helped develop Shazam, a popular application that offers music identification services. Williams studied at Northwestern University in the United States and at the University of Cambridge in the United Kingdom. The concept behind the application is said to have started as a joke at a dinner party and was further developed once a need for such an app was identified. Cuddlr's design was overseen by co-founder Jeff Kulak, a Montreal-based graphic designer and illustrator. Its media relations were managed by co-founder Damon Brown who operates out of Las Vegas and is a professional speaker, business coach, and author of twenty-five books. Brown has a Masters in Magazine Publishing from Northwestern University and sat on the board of the American Society of Journalists and Authors.

As of March 16, 2015, Cuddlr reported that it shut down, stating "Cuddlr closes up shop and wishes you all the best".

In September 2015 Cuddlr was acquired by Hiplex LLC, an NYC-based company, and rebranded as Spoonr.

As of January 2017, Spoonr has officially shut down.

== Reception ==
Cuddlr has been featured on Tech Times, Cosmopolitan, BBC News, and more. It hit the Apple App Store top 10 twice: In September 2014 and in January 2015, shortly after it was featured on the cover of the Wall Street Journal. Approximately a quarter million users joined Cuddlr at its peak. The application has been subject to numerous critiques. According to Alex Sevigny, a Canadian communications expert at McMaster University, for CBC Hamilton, the app commodified intimacy and made a private activity public. Kate Bellamy, a journalist from Metro News UK, criticized the app for encouraging people to disrespect personal boundaries, which could supposedly potentially affect the lives of non-users as well. UWIRE wrote that only people desperate for human touch would turn to technology to fulfill this human need with a stranger, and that, therefore, the application was supposedly unsafe.

== See also ==
- Comparison of online dating services
- Timeline of online dating services
