= John McEntee (political aide) =

American political advisor (born 1990)

- McEntee in 2026

Director of the White House Presidential Personnel Office
- In office January 8, 2020 – January 20, 2021
- President: Donald Trump
- Preceded by: Sean Doocey
- Succeeded by: Catherine M. Russell

Personal Aide to the President
- In office January 20, 2017 – March 13, 2018
- President: Donald Trump
- Preceded by: Joe Paulsen
- Succeeded by: Jordan Karem

Personal details
- Born: John David McEntee II; May 9, 1990 (age 36) Fullerton, California, U.S.
- Party: Republican
- Education: University of Connecticut (BA)
- Occupation: Entrepreneur; political advisor
- Website: Official website

John David McEntee II (born May 9, 1990) is an American entrepreneur and political advisor. He began as a body man and personal aide to the president but was dismissed by White House Chief of Staff John F. Kelly in March 2018 after failing a security clearance background check, which had found that he was under investigation by the Department of Homeland Security for issues related to gambling.

After Kelly was dismissed in December 2018, Donald Trump rehired McEntee and named him Director of the White House Presidential Personnel Office in February 2020. His role in the last year of Trump's first term presidency earned him the moniker "Deputy President".

McEntee is an active conservative social media influencer with over 3.3 million followers on TikTok. He also co-founded The Right Stuff, a discontinued dating app for Republican singles.

Since 2025, McEntee has been a registered lobbyist for two Chinese Communist Party aligned technology companies, Tencent and Zhongji InnoLight, both of which are on the Pentagon Section 1260H sanctions blacklist. Federal lobbying disclosures indicate that by the third quarter of 2026, he has been paid cumulatively more than $1 million for his work.

== Early life ==
McEntee was born on May 9, 1990, in Fullerton, California, to a Catholic family. His father is John D. McEntee Sr., a producer and manager who books celebrities for private and corporate functions, as well as for resorts including the MGM Resorts, Caesars Palace, and Venetian Properties. He first attended St. Angela Merici Parish School in Brea, California, and then attended Servite High School in Anaheim, where he played quarterback on the varsity football team.

McEntee was a redshirt his first year at the University of Connecticut, and completed his sociology degree in the spring of his senior year. He played college football for the Huskies, but was used sparingly in his first two seasons. McEntee was named the starting quarterback during the 2011 season, after a strong performance against Buffalo. In the next game against Western Michigan, he recorded his season and career-high, after throwing for 300 yards and four touchdowns. During that season, McEntee appeared in a viral YouTube video that featured him throwing football trickshots. McEntee lost the starting job to transfer Chandler Whitmer in the 2012 season, and dropped down the depth chart to third-string, making just three appearances for the Huskies.

== Career ==
=== Trump campaign and first term ===
In 2015, McEntee worked as a production assistant for Fox News, focusing on the channel's social media accounts. He successfully lobbied for a job on the Trump campaign, joining as a volunteer in July of that year and later being promoted to a full-time position as trip director.

After Donald Trump won the 2016 election, McEntee was asked to join his staff as an aide, serving as his body man. McEntee accompanied Trump on all trips, most notably the President's trip to Saudi Arabia in May 2017, where "Man in red tie" (McEntee) and "#Trump's_daughter" (Ivanka Trump) briefly became the most trending hashtags in that country.

McEntee's first term of service in the White House ended on March 13, 2018, after Chief of Staff John Kelly ousted him on the pretext of an "unspecified security issue" that was later revealed to be unreported gambling winnings.

=== 2020 United States presidential election and attempts to overturn it ===
After his dismissal from the White House, McEntee was hired by Trump's 2020 reelection campaign as a senior adviser for campaign operations. In January 2020, McEntee returned to the White House in his old position of bodyman, where he shared some of his former duties with Nick Luna, the Director of Oval Office Operations. Shortly after his return, McEntee was then promoted to Director of the White House Presidential Personnel Office, overseeing the President's 4,000 appointments to the federal bureaucracy. McEntee reported directly to the President and continued to hold his role as Trump's bodyman concurrently. He was tasked with identifying and removing political appointees and career officials deemed insufficiently loyal to the administration, despite having no previous personnel or people management experience. McEntee then installed officials who were ideologically in line with the Trump campaign themes of non-interventionist foreign policy, immigration restriction, and economic nationalism. McEntee's purge of the Trump administration was lauded by many Trump loyalists who have long urged President Trump to terminate those in his administration who were part of the Washington establishment.

McEntee also engineered a purge of neoconservatives from the senior ranks of the Pentagon, appointed the officials who led the effort to crack down on social media companies for censoring conservatives, and got rid of the Affirmatively Furthering Fair Housing regulation.

In the closing weeks of the Trump presidency, McEntee worked with Douglas Macgregor, who McEntee appointed to the role of Senior Advisor to Acting Secretary of Defense Christopher Miller, to draft a brief document ordering the swift withdrawal of U.S. military forces from Afghanistan, Iraq, Syria, Germany, and Africa. The president signed the memo, and it was forwarded to Kash Patel at the Pentagon without any review by the legal, military or national security apparatus, nor was it recorded by Derek Lyons, the White House staff secretary responsible for filing and transmitting official presidential orders. After Miller and Joint Chiefs chairman Mark Milley went to the White House to inquire about the order, it was rescinded except for the withdrawal from Somalia, which did occur.

Leading up to the certification of the 2020 election, McEntee falsely claimed Mike Pence had the authority to overturn the results. McEntee sent a series of bullet points via text message to Pence's chief of staff to assert that Thomas Jefferson "Used His Position as VP to Win" the 1801 election. In a piece about McEntee, ABC News correspondent Jonathan Karl pointed out the inaccuracy of this comparison because "Jefferson didn't discard electoral votes, as Trump wanted Pence to do. He accepted electoral votes from a state that nobody had questioned he had won."

On November 9, 2021, McEntee was issued a subpoena to testify by the House January 6th Committee. On two occasions in 2022, he appeared before the committee in a taped deposition, returning in person in January 2023.

=== The Right Stuff Dating App ===
After leaving the White House in 2021, McEntee met with billionaire Peter Thiel to pitch him several tech startup ideas, one of which was the idea for a conservative dating app called The Right Stuff. Thiel agreed to fund the app and subsequently made a seed round investment of $1.5 million. The app launched on September 30, 2022. The Right Stuff's official launch was announced exclusively on Tucker Carlson Tonight, where McEntee appeared as a guest.

Rather than pursue conventional marketing techniques, McEntee utilized a unique new strategy in which he promoted the app in part through videos staged to appear as though the viewer was on a date with McEntee, where he shared controversial and provocative opinions on a variety of topics. The style of these videos remains a notable feature of McEntee's online presence, particularly on TikTok, where his account has amassed over 2 billion views as of 2026.

=== Project 2025 ===
In May 2023, it was announced that McEntee was joining The Heritage Foundation's Project 2025 as a senior advisor. Described by The New York Times as "one of Trump's most trusted aides", McEntee and his association with Project 2025 serves as the main link between the Heritage Foundation and Trump. On November 1, 2023, the Times reported that his role includes working as "part of a team searching for potential lawyers" for Trump's next Administration. McEntee has stated that as part of Project 2025, he supports a total ban on pornography.

=== TikTok ===
Throughout 2023 and 2024, while United States legislation considered restricting TikTok, McEntee established himself as an outspoken defender of the app, calling Republicans "ridiculous" for trying to ban it. McEntee also accused Washington politicians of using TikTok and China as scapegoats. In April 2023, McEntee became the first conservative to defend TikTok when President Biden and Congressional Republicans moved to ban the app, stating that the ban was "a Washington Uniparty plan to censor information they can't control, based on a fake national security narrative." In May 2024, McEntee sparked outrage after posting a video on TikTok in which he made a joke about giving homeless people fake money, stating that they would be arrested when trying to use it. McEntee stated in the video, "I always keep this fake Hollywood money in my car... so when a homeless person asks for money, I give them a fake $5 bill. So I feel good about myself. They feel good. And then when they go to use it, they get arrested." He went on to assert his efforts were helping "clean up the streets". While the video included a caption stating "Just a joke. Everyone calm down," it was widely condemned. Critics described McEntee's actions as cruel and inhumane and several noted that, if McEntee had done what he had claimed, it would likely be considered a federal crime under 18 US Code section 480. In October 2024, McEntee sparked outrage by making a joking play on the phrase "mail-in voting", stating that only men should be allowed to vote: "Sorry we want MALE only voting. The 19th might have to go," he said, referring to the 19th Amendment, which guaranteed the right of women to vote.

=== Lobbying ===
Tencent’s U.S. arm hired McEntee in July 2025 to assist with an “erroneous trade restriction designation” after the Pentagon listed the tech giant to its list of Chinese military companies. In September 2025, McEntee officially registered to lobby for the company and lobbied the Treasury Department, arguing that the Biden Administration only included Tencent to the Pentagon list “as part of their political vendetta against anything Chinese”. McEntee has stated that Tencent is not a military company and that “the President has made it clear he wants cooperation and mutual investment from China”. By August 2026, McEntee had made $850,000 from his contract with Tencent.

In August 2026, McEntee took on a second Chinese client to lobby for, Zhongji InnoLight, about two months after the company was added to the Pentagon's 1260H list and after MO Strategies consequently ended its contract with Hogan Lovells to have them lobby for Zhongji InnoLight.

=== Potential presidential run ===
McEntee has been identified as a dark horse candidate for the 2028 Republican presidential primaries. He was seen in at least two straw polls in November 2026 as the favorite candidate of two College Republican Chapters. As of November 2026, he was placing fourth in prediction markets to be the Republican nominee. On November 17th 2026, during an interview with Jack Neel, McEntee said that he would run for president if the podcast episode got 500,000 views. Around the same time, he said in a video, hinting at a presidential run: “I know everyone’s having fun with the memes. But honestly, if Ted Cruz is allowed to run for president, I think a TikTokker is."

== Personal life ==
In 2026, McEntee backed Steve Hilton for California governor, donating the maximum primary contribution to Hilton’s campaign. McEntee has also made donations to the UCONN football program, most recently a six figure contribution in 2026.

In 2024, multiple reports surfaced accusing McEntee of sending inappropriate and sexually explicit messages to young women, through social media platforms and The Right Stuff. One woman, Grace Carter, shared that McEntee reached out to her in October 2023, when she was 18 years old, offering merchandise from the app and attempting to arrange a trip for her and a friend to visit him in Los Angeles. Despite Carter expressing discomfort and declining to visit, McEntee continued to contact her. Another woman reported similar advances and inappropriate sexual comments from McEntee after connecting with him through the Right Stuff app. Both women indicated that McEntee's behavior made them uncomfortable.
