= Gleeden =

French online dating service for extramarital relationships

- Website type: Online dating service / social networking service
- Available in: English, French, Italian, German, Spanish, Turkish, Romanian, Portuguese
- Website: www.gleeden.com
- Commercial: Yes
- Launched: 1 December 2009
- Current status: Active

Gleeden is a French online dating service and social networking service specialised in extramarital relationships, that was launched in 2009. Over 65% of users reside in the European Union.

Gleeden's membership service is free for women to use. The name of the site is a portmanteau of “Glee” and “Eden” (referring to the biblical “Garden of Eden”).

== History ==
Gleeden’s dating service was founded in September 2010. The site was officially launched in Europe in December 2009. Gleeden is available in English, French, Italian, German and Spanish. In 2010, Gleeden opened to the public in Australia and New Zealand. It is a brand of Blackdivine Group.

Gleeden.com is available in 159 countries. As of 2017, Gleeden.com's faculty are all women.

== Community ==
Gleeden’s community is open to adults of all relationship statuses (married, separated, divorced, co-habitating, single) and sexual orientations (heterosexual, bisexual, homosexual). Gleeden is primarily marketed to married men and women.

== Services ==
Gleeden’s business model is based on a system of credits rather than monthly subscriptions as opposed to EHarmony or Meetic. A subscriber can purchase credit packs in order to communicate with other members. Members pay a one-time fee of 2-3 credits to participate in an email or chat conversation with another member. Any follow-up messages in a thread are free. Private messages, chats, and credit packs do not expire. The average subscriber has £40 (US$44) worth of credits in his or her account at any given time. Members get in contact with each other via chat or private messages. Members can send each other virtual gifts, which are sorted by type and price. Although the moderation policy can be strict Gleeden members can keep private photos in a separate photo album, or “private book”, which can be viewed with the permission of the member who owns the album.

== Moderation ==
Gleeden purports to moderate its members heavily to ensure that all members on the site are real. The site in addition promotes a strict privacy policy. Gleeden prohibits vulgarity, nudity and euphemism. A reporting system is available for members to report unseemly activity. This is described as a method of ensuring a “harassment-free” environment.

== Controversy ==
Since its launch, Gleeden has received criticism for allowing married members. The site has been severely criticized for allowing married people to identify their status and interests on their profile.

As stated by Gleeden, “In an age where divorce is 40-60% among newlyweds and 33% among those married for 10 years, many times extramarital affairs can intervene as therapy for a couple. Gleeden is a facilitator of confidence where married couples can disregard the taboo and explore their desires safely.”

In 2015, the company was sued by the National Confederation of Catholic Family Associations (CNAFC), which contested the site's legality. Although adultery has not been a crime in France since 1975, the association described the adverts as “publicly promoting infidelity and cheating” and as a clear incitement to disrespect the French civil code, which demands of spouses “mutual respect, fidelity, help and assistance”, a disposition mostly used in divorce cases. The CNAFC lost the case in 2017, and the French Court of Cassation rejected the appeal in 2020, reiterating that infidelity is not illegal in France.

== See also ==
- Ashley Madison
- Comparison of online dating websites
