= Chyrpe =

Dating app for female-led relationships

- Chyrpe logo
- Website type: Online dating service
- Owner: Greenrocks Development
- CEO: Christopher Holzhauser
- Website: www.chyrpe.com
- Commercial: Yes
- Registration: Required for membership
- Launched: May 2024; 2 years ago
- Current status: Active

Chyrpe is an online dating mobile app dedicated to female-led relationships (FLR) and femdom. Chyrpe emphasizes female dominance, mutual consent, clear roles, and high user security. Optionally, Chyrpe allows users to indicate their relationship preferences and kinks.

Similarly to Bumble, Chyrpe is designed to let women lead the conversation and set the rules, through a feature called Powerboard. Men can only initiate intimate conversations if the female permits. Half of all users are female.

Every user is mandatorily verified through biometric data, in order to prevent trolls, scammers, catfishers and time-wasters from using the app. All users who are interested in financial domination or sugar dating are required to declare this preference up front, reportedly to keep all parties safe. Profiles who are interested in findom are hidden from users who are not interested in findom.

On 28 February 2026, Chyrpe launched a publicity stunt in Camden Town, London, that featured men who were handcuffed to lampposts and railings. The men wore white t-shirts with provocative slogans like "My girlfriend’s property" and "Good Boy in Training". The goal of the stunt was to normalize female-led relationships, which often face shame and embarrassment due to social stigma.

Chyrpe uses a freemium model. Registration is free and free users are limited to eight free swipes per day. Chyrpe has been downloaded over one million times in over 120 countries, as of 2025. By August 2025, Chyrpe was among the top 15 most downloaded Lifestyle apps on the Swiss App Store.

It was founded by CEO Christopher Holzhauser and was launched in May 2024. Holzhauser conceived of Chyrpe during his time in university when he heard of some struggles faced by his peers. One of his male friends struggled to find a dominant female partner, and a dominant female lamented about being objectified. Chyrpe was created to help people find female-led relationships more discreetly and far-reaching than meeting people in person. Users on the app can use the app in confidence without fearing humiliation or isolation for liking FLR, since all the users on the app support FLR.
