= Tastebuds.fm =

Music-based online dating website

Tastebuds
- Website type: Online dating service, social network service
- Owner: Tastebuds Media Ltd.
- Creators: Alex Parish, Julian Keenaghan
- Website: tastebuds.fm
- Registration: Required for membership
- Launched: June 2010; 16 years ago

Tastebuds was a dating and social networking website and iOS app that matches people based on their tastes in music.

== Overview ==
Users can connect with Facebook, Spotify or Last.fm, or enter some of their favorite musical artists to be matched with people who share their musical preferences.

Tastebuds is integrated with popular events service Songkick allowing users to arrange to meet at concerts they're attending.

Messaging is free on the iPhone app, however, it is not free to new website users as of January 2014. Existing users can message anyone.

Tastebuds acquired one of its competitors, moosify in 2014, bringing along approximately 100,000 members with it.

On Thursday 2 March 2023, Tastebuds announced to its online members "It is with a heavy heart that we share the news that Tastebuds will be shutting down on April 18th, 2023. Unfortunately, it is no longer viable to keep Tastebuds running. Supporting a service of this scale - while maintaining a high quality of user experience - is a huge technical and administrative undertaking which requires considerable resources. We have explored many different ways to keep the service going, but ultimately, it is no longer possible!"

== See also ==
- List of online dating websites
- Online dating service
