= Spray Date =

Defunct Swedish dating website

- Website type: Online dating service, Social network service
- Owner: Spray Network AB
- Website: http://www.spraydate.se

Spray Date was an online dating website run by Spray Network AB. It was founded in 1999 as the first dating site in Sweden. In the first 10 years, 450,000 members went on a date and 150,000 had started a relationship with someone they met on Spraydate. It was mostly free, but for a fee, users got access to larger images and more search options. Spray Date was discontinued in 2013 when match.com acquired the site. Its users were then migrated to the main match.com site itself.

== Overview ==
The site was available in several countries and the Swedish version had at its peak over 700 000 members (August 2008) and was at the time the largest dating site in Sweden. The average age of the members was between 25–49. Seventy percent of members claimed that they have gone on a date with someone from the site; while a third claimed that they met their partner via the site.

Spray Date has also arranged cruises for singles. Spray date was only available in Swedish.

== See also ==
- List of online dating websites
