= Christian Connection (website) =

Online dating service

- Website type: Online dating service
- Owner: Widernet Communications Ltd
- Website: christianconnection.com
- Commercial: Yes
- Registration: Yes
- Launched: 2000; 26 years ago
- Current status: Active

Christian Connection is an online dating service for single Christians, operating in the United Kingdom, Australia, and the United States. The service is owned and operated by Widernet Communications Ltd, based in London. Christian Connection is described as "one of the oldest dating sites" in the Christian dating niche.

== History ==
Christian Connection was founded by Jackie Elton and launched at the Greenbelt Festival in August 2000, with registrations beginning in September 2000. Elton has stated that one of her main motivations was addressing the invisibility of single people in churches, noting that church leaders are often focused on families and married couples while forgetting that single people exist and have pastoral needs. The service has maintained a presence at Greenbelt, organising social events for single Christians and collaborating with other festival groups, including OUT@Greenbelt. The site subsequently expanded internationally, launching in Australia in 2004, entering the U.S. market in 2012, and beginning operations in Hong Kong and Singapore in 2013.

In 2018, Christian Connection acquired ChristianSingleMix.com, a competing Christian dating service that had been founded in 2012 by Chris Kapnisis and Rod Keane.

== Media coverage ==
Christian Connection received early media attention when it was featured in the Sunday Telegraph on 18 February 2001 with the headline "Christian dating agency goes online to find perfect partners". The Guardian covered the service the following day, noting an estimated 300,000 single Christians in Britain at the time.

The service appeared on the front page of The Daily Telegraph on 17 April 2001, with coverage of its use among clergy and seminary students.

In January 2014, Christian Connection launched an advertising campaign on the London Underground with the slogan "Christians make better lovers." The campaign, created by advertising agency Noah, ran for two weeks and included additional taglines such as "God knew you would see this" and "Another dating website? Thank God!" The advertisements generated media coverage across national and international outlets, including criticism from comedian David Baddiel.

In February 2015, BBC Songs of Praise featured a Christian Speed Dating event organized by Christian Connection as part of a Valentine's Day program.

== Industry reform ==
Christian Connection raised industry awareness of the need for better standards in online dating. Christian Connection was a founding member of the Online Dating Association (ODA), an industry standards body formed in response to consumer concerns about transparency in the UK's £300 million online dating market. The formation of the ODA was prompted by critical media investigations, including a Channel 4 News investigation into allegations that dating site operator Global Personals had misled consumers by using false profiles, and a BBC documentary that alleged dating sites were taking data from social media to create fake profiles.

The ODA launched in January 2014 with thirteen founding members, establishing a code of conduct requiring transparency in pricing models, billing practices, data privacy, and profile authenticity. Founder Jackie Elton served on the board of directors alongside representatives from other major dating services including Match, eHarmony, MySingleFriend, Lovestruck, and Guardian Soulmates.

== Research and community impact ==
In 2012, Christian Connection commissioned a major survey on "Singleness in the UK Church," which gathered responses from over 3,000 single Christians about their experiences of church and faith. The research, conducted by the Single Friendly Church Network, was the first major survey to focus specifically on single Christians and their place within church communities. The survey findings revealed that while many single people felt accepted by their churches, significant numbers also felt overlooked, isolated, or excluded from certain aspects of church life, with 43% agreeing that their churches "don't know what to do with them." Additional research has found that more than a third of single people feel ignored, inadequate, and believe they are treated differently from those in relationships. The research highlighted issues including churches' family-oriented focus, exclusion from social activities, and lack of programming for single adults over 30. The survey's findings prompted the formation of the Single Friendly Church Network, which works to help churches better support their single members.

== Industry recognition ==
Christian Connection received the "Best Niche Dating Site" award at the iDate Awards in 2013 and was subsequently recognized at the UK Dating Awards, winning the Religious Dating Site of the Year award multiple times between 2014 and 2017 and the Daters' Favourite Site award in 2016.
