= BeautifulPeople.com =

Online dating service

- A screenshot of BeautifulPeople.com from August 2025
- Website type: Online dating service
- Owner: BeautifulPeople Network
- Creators: Robert Hintze, Kasper Hjorth, Kasper Lausen, Morten Lanng & Claus Pedersen
- Website: www.beautifulpeople.com
- Commercial: Yes
- Registration: Yes
- Current status: Active

BeautifulPeople.com is an online dating service where applicants to the website are voted in or out by existing members of the opposite sex over a 48-hour period.

BeautifulPeople.com was launched in Denmark in 2002. The site was launched in the United States and the United Kingdom in 2005 and went global in 2009. The website has attracted considerable controversy in the media and much criticism since its inception due to its exclusive business model of only allowing perceived attractive men and women to join the dating community. The website's managing director Greg Hodge claimed that it is "based on a fundamental principle of human nature".

About 20 percent of applications to the site make it into the community.

In 2012, BeautifulPeople launched an exclusively gay version of BeautifulPeople.com. BeautifulPeople launched a satirical campaign in support of same-sex marriage in the United States in June 2012.

In January 2010, BeautifulPeople removed 5,000 members from the site for gaining weight.

In June 2011, it was attacked by a virus which allowed users to join without going through the mandatory 48 hour voting process. Reportedly 30,000 people who were mistakenly let into the dating community were kicked off of the website as a result. The media dubbed the virus "Shrek" after the animated film with an underlying story line of how looks should not matter.

As of 2013, BeautifulPeople was regularly hosting events for its members in the US and Europe. In order to gain entrance to its events, attendees must look as attractive as they have represented themselves online or they will be turned away by the door screeners, who the media have coined the "Beauty Police".

In 2016, private data from over 1.1 million user profiles and 15 million messages exchanged between members were leaked after BeautifulPeople had erroneously made it available on a MongoDB test server. The information made public included addresses, education, employment, income, and sexual preferences.

== See also ==
- Comparison of online dating websites
