= Pure (app) =

Mobile dating app

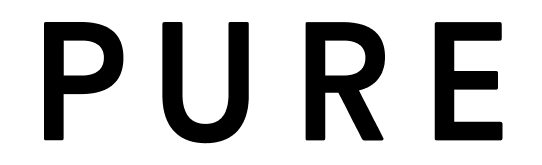
- Developer: Online Classifieds AG
- Operating system: iOS, Android
- Website: pure.app

Pure is an online dating platform and an application that allows users to post personal ads to find matches based on their desires, preferences, and intentions (“turn-ons”). Launched in 2012, the app is known for its safety and privacy features.

== History ==
=== Founding and early development ===
In 2012, Ukrainian entrepreneurs Roman Sydorenko and Oleksandr Kukhtenko presented the first concept of Pure and raised initial $400,000 in investments.

=== Headquarters and leadership ===
In 2015, Pure was ranked third in the Lisbon Challenge and was granted an office in Lisbon by the Mayor's Office of the City of Lisbon. In 2020, Olga Petrunina became the CEO. In 2022, the headquarters of the company moved to Zug, Switzerland and Luka Dremelj became the CEO. As of January 2026, the company has reached the milestone of $100M in gross revenue.

== See also ==
- Dating
- Tinder
- Feeld
- Hookup culture
- Hinge
- Bumble
