= ScientificMatch.com =

- Founded: December 2007
- Dissolved: Early 2012
- Headquarters: Boston
- Founder: Eric Holzle
- Website: www.scientificmatch.com
- Current status: Defunct

ScientificMatch.com was an online dating service launched in December 2007 by Eric Holzle and based in Boston, Massachusetts.

The company scanned cells from the inside of members' mouths for six immunity markers to help them find someone who is a match. The test results were used to match people with complementary immune systems.

The website was shut down in early 2012.

== See also ==
- Mouse Mingle
