= Inner Circle (dating app) =

Dating app

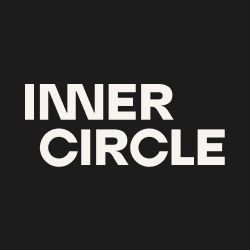
- Website type: Online dating service
- Available in: English
- Owner: Circle Imperium BV
- Website: www.theinnercircle.co
- Commercial: Yes
- Registration: Yes
- Launched: 2012
- Current status: Active

Inner Circle is a global dating app, launched in 2012 in the Netherlands. The mobile app is a place to connect and date people, but also to, "be a place to feel part of a community that moves in the same circles." Built on the belief that "opposites don’t attract," a thorough application and screening process curates a community of people who connect over shared lifestyles and interests.

== History ==
The founders looked for a space where they could meet like-minded people that moved in the same circles as they did. Instead, they found online dating services with faceless profiles and made a choice: they created the space themselves and called it Inner Circle. Built organically without funding, the Inner Circle community is now made up of over 7.2 million people around the world. The dating app and community has also gained popularity in Brazil and the rest of Latin America.

== Format ==
The app uses categories such as like-mindedness and lifestyle to match candidates and claims that their thorough application process insures all profiles are genuine. For example, users need to pass a face verification. After the face verification is completed, people select six lifestyles and describe one of them in more detail. The Membership and Community Team check applications for compatibility and eligibility. After profiles are approved by the committee, users can connect to people who share the same lifestyle and invite each other to events where they can meet in person. The Membership and Community Team regularly reviews profiles at random to verify user profiles.

== Access ==
Not everyone will be accepted to join the Inner Circle community. Each application is reviewed by their membership team, to make a hive mind of like-minded people, as well as making sure quality is at the centre of dating. Once approved, people can earn access to the community and certain features such as liking profiles and online chatting by inviting friends. Alternatively, people can pay to become an Inner Circle member through a paid subscription. As a member users can use the app to connect with the community, as well as get invited to offline events.

== Events ==
Inner Circle has offered events for the community to meet and connect in real life with people who move in similar circles. Inner Circle claims that their events are "not events you’d come across every day. And definitely not the cheesy speed-dating events you’d expect from other dating apps."

Previous events:

- Paloma Night – Karavaan, Amsterdam
- Haus of Love – Branco Espaço, São Paulo
- Encuentro – Wallace Whisky Bar, Mexico City
- Soulmate Thursday – Afrika Rooftop, Bogotá
- Flirte Hour – Recife, Brazil

== Partnerships ==
Inner Circle is partnered with brands who, "have the same values as they have." They claim to be "always looking to collaborate with brands from other industries to reflect a lifestyle that is bigger than dating."

Examples include:

- Mubi
- Rocycle
