= Find Your FaceMate =

American dating website

- Website type: Online dating service
- Creator: Christina Bloom
- Commercial: Yes
- Registration: Yes
- Current status: No longer active

FindYourFaceMate was an American dating website created by Christina Bloom that operated from 2011 to 2014.

== Overview ==
The platform attracted 50,000 customers.

The website appealed to those holding the belief that people are attracted to significant others with similar features.

Founder Christina Bloom died in December 2014, and the site shut down shortly thereafter.
