= Bliss (magazine) =

British teenage magazine

July 2014 final issue

Bliss was a monthly British magazine aimed at 14- to 17-year-old girls, retailing at £2.75 and often coming with a gift such as make-up or a bag. The content covered candid celebrity gossip, latest fashions, hair and make-up looks, a problem page on puberty, boyfriends, friends and sex, an interview with the celebrity cover girl, entertainment reviews, romance advice, psychology for friendships, and real-life stories.

The magazine was launched by EMAP in June 1995, and sold to Italian publishers Panini in 2006. At the time of its sale in 2006, it had a circulation of 213,466 (already in decline), but this had fallen to 50,043 by December 2012.

In June 2014, it was announced the July issue - already on newsstands - would be the last.

== Features ==
- Taylor Swift graced the September 2009 cover in a dress designed by David Peck of 11:11.
