= Dead House =

- Directed by: Brini Amerigo
- Written by: Brini Amerigo; Andrea Cavaletto; Marco Palese
- Produced by: Andrea De Rubeis; Marco Palese; Giorgio Rosati
- Starring: Danny Cutler; Alex Lucchesi; Alex Southern; Kate Davies-Speak; David White; James Wiles; Vanina Marini; Alexandra Antonioli; Ettore Nicoletti
- Cinematography: Paco Ferrari
- Music by: Giacomo Falciani
- Production company: Doghouse Picture
- Distributed by: Wild Eye Releasing
- Release date: 2014
- Running time: 75 minutes
- Country: Italy
- Language: English

Dead House, also known as Beautiful People, is a 2014 Italian zombie horror film that was directed by Brini Amerigo.

== Plot ==
The Pontecorvo family is just settling down to dinner when three thugs, Testamento, Nibbio, and Nibbo's brother Brett, break into their home. They quickly set about capturing the family and forcing them to participate in despicable acts. The thugs are unaware that the scientist father, John Pontecorvo, has been working on an experiment that can bring the dead back to life as savage zombies in the house's basement. These undead are released after Testamento ventures into the basement looking for something to steal. The Pontecorvos are then forced to fight for their lives against not only their human captors but also the undead looking to kill them as well.

== Cast ==
- Danny Cutler as Nibbio
- Alex Lucchesi as Testamento
- Alex Southern as Brett
- Kate Davies-Speak as Elena Pontecorvo
- David White as John Pontecorvo
- James Wiles as Paul Pontecorvo
- Vanina Marini as Anna Hicks
- Alexandra Antonioli as Sara Hicks
- Ettore Nicoletti as Luca Hicks

== Production ==
Filming for Dead House took place in Italy under the title Beautiful People. It was Amerigo's feature film debut. British actor Kate Davies-Speak was brought in to play as Elena, the matriarch of the Pontecorvo family.

== Release ==
The film screened during July 2014 at the 10th Grossmann Fantastic Film and Wine Festival in Slovenia, under the title Beautiful People. It continued to screen at film festivals such as Fantafestival under this name until it received a title change to Dead House for its 2018 release in the United States through Wild Eye Releasing.

== Reception ==
HorrorNews.net reviewed the film under its original and US release titles, with both reviewers noting that the film had a lot of graphic violence. James Perkins of Starburst praised the film for its blend of genres, as well as for its acting. Modern Horrors felt that the film "may be uneven, but that doesn’t mean it isn’t good. This is NOT a traditional zombie flick." Nick Rocco Scalia of Film Threat was critical of the film, writing that it "might bring to mind something like the bikers/zombies/heroes fracas of the second half of George Romero’s Dawn of the Dead, but Dead House has none of that classic film’s wit, substance, finely wrought human drama, or beautifully orchestrated mayhem."
