= Paktor =

Dating and networking mobile application

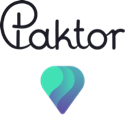
- Developer: Paktor Pte Ltd
- Release: June 2013
- Operating system: iOS, Android
- Website: gopaktor.com

Paktor is a location-based dating and networking mobile application that connects mutually interested users and allows them to chat individually or as a group. Founded in Singapore, the app was launched in June 2013, and has over 5 billion swipes to date (October 2015). In late 2013, Paktor launched a subsidiary called GaiGai, an offline dating service that focuses on match-making and dating events. The word 'Paktor' originates from the Cantonese word for 'dating' (Chinese character 拍拖).

== History ==
=== Founding ===
Paktor was founded by Joseph Phua and Ng Jing Shen.

Paktor was first launched in Singapore in June 2013. Despite the immature market, there was a lot of interest from consumers and according to a Paktor newsletter, there were 250,000 matches in the first 2 weeks of 2014. The company also shared that it had received over 100 million profile ratings at that time.

The app is also available in Taiwan, Malaysia, Indonesia, Vietnam, Thailand, and South Korea.

In February 2017, Paktor acquired dating apps DOWN, Goodnight, and Groopify, folding them into Paktor Labs, a social app accelerator.

=== Change of Management ===
In November 2017, Paktor Group appointed co-founder and chief technology officer Ng Jing Shen as CEO of Paktor Group, taking over from current CEO Joseph Phua. Phua remained in the group CEO of M17 Entertainment which was formed after the merger of Paktor and 17 Media. The company also promoted current head of operations Shn Juay to Chief Operating Officer at Paktor Group.

In 2018, M17 Entertainment sold DOWN, the United States-based dating application, back to its founder Colin Hodge.

== Company Overview ==
=== Financials ===
In March 2014, Paktor revealed its first round of funding with a US$500,000 pre-Series-A round that valued the brand at US$6.5 million. At this time, co-founder and CEO Joseph Phua was quoted as saying that the app was “easily 10-20 times ahead of the next player” referring to their main markets; Singapore, Malaysia, Vietnam, Thailand, Taiwan and the Philippines.

Series A was secured in November 2014, bringing the total raised to US$5 million. This round was led by Vertex Ventures Southeast Asia & India. The funds were reported to be used for expansion into different territories and the introduction of new services under the Paktor group. At this time, the size of the network stood at 1.5 million registered users.

The next milestone was the US$7.3 million Series B funding in July 2015. This raised total funding to more than US$12 million and Paktor said its network had five million registered users and 12 million matches a month. There were also 500 million monthly swipes on average across the region.

The startup secured another US$10 million in a venture round with its sights set on expansion in Japan and South Korea. YJ Capital — the corporate venture firm belonging to Yahoo Capital — led the round, which included participation from fellow new investors Global Grand Leisure, Golden Equator Capital and Sebrina Holdings, as well as existing backers Vertex Ventures Southeast Asia & India, MNC Media Group, Majuven and Convergence Ventures.

In November 2016, Paktor announced another round of funding in the amount of $32.5 million to expand its focus into new kinds of mobile entertainment. This new raise, was led by U.S.-Asia-based K2 Global and Indonesia’s MNC Media Group, with participation from other, undisclosed investors.

In December the same year, the company announced that it has agreed to buy a controlling stake in Taiwanese start-up 17 Media. 17 Media owns a photo-sharing and live streaming app that has over 15 million users worldwide. The deal was Paktor's first acquisition and comes as the start-up looks to diversify into the social entertainment space.

Paktor announced its next wave of acquisitions in February 2017 with Down, Kickoff, Goodnight and Groopify joining the group and forming the Paktor Labs Division. Paktor Labs will act as an accelerator for social apps with high potential. The dating app next announced its merger with 17 Media, forming a new company called M17 Entertainment and combining all assets and revenue under the new entity.

=== Advertising ===
In 2015, the app appointed Taiwanese actress and social media personality, Ouyang Nini, and Indonesian actor, Junior Liem, as the brand’s ambassadors in Taiwan and Indonesia respectively. A series of visual advertisements were launched with the appointment announcement. At a press conference, Ouyang Nini said that her father, former actor and Chinese Nationalist Party (KMT) Taipei City Councilor, Ouyang Lung, approves of her endorsement to use the app to meet new friends.

== Reception ==
=== In the region ===
Beyond Singapore, Paktor is available in Taiwan, Malaysia, Indonesia, Vietnam and Thailand.

As of September 2016, an estimated 12 million people in Southeast Asia use the app every month, with an average of 20 million matches per month and over 5 billion swipes to date. There are an estimated 500,000 users in Indonesia alone.

The app has its own localised slogan in Taiwan, "友妳選擇 友你選擇", which means ‘to choose your friend yourself’. In January 2015, Paktor created two telephone booths near the Taipei 101, to encourage passers-by to explore the app and provide assurance that the app is a safe and private way to meet new friends across countries

In 2013, Paktor set a Guinness World record for The World’s Largest Speed Dating Event held in Vietnam. The event drew 600 participants including local celebrities popular among Vietnamese youth. This record was most recently broken by Calgary Speed Dating Inc. (Canada) at Telus Spark Science Centre in Calgary, Canada, on 14 February 2014

=== In the media ===
Paktor has received widespread news coverage and been featured on TechCrunch, Bloomberg, CNBC Asia, CNN and others. The app was positively received in Singapore when it was launched gaining over 25,000 users in the first month. There were also comparisons to established mobile dating apps like Tinder and how it was a similar product and had the same mechanics.

Global Dating Insights (GDI) publication regarded Paktor as one of the dating apps to watch. With relatively little competition in Southeast Asia, GDI assesses that the app to have huge potential, crediting the CEO for having ‘expertly navigated’ the Southeast Asian market with multiple countries each with different cultures, dating habits and languages. In October 2015, Paktor hired two former Meetic senior marketing executives, Jose Ruano and Miguel Mangas, spearheading overseas expansion efforts outside of Asia. The two speak Spanish, which has strategic global importance as 425 million people in the world use Spanish as their first language. Already available in the two most spoken languages, English and Chinese, the hiring acquisitions would allow Paktor to break into European and South American markets.

The conservative nature of Asian cultures has also presented challenges, where regular dating and casual sex is frowned upon.
