= Nerds at Heart =

American dating service

- Company type: Private
- Industry: Entertainment, dating service
- Founded: 2006
- Headquarters: Chicago, Illinois
- Area served: Chicago, Milwaukee, Minneapolis
- Key people: Bathsheba Birman (co-founder)

Nerds at Heart is a dating events service located in Chicago, Bay Area, Milwaukee and Minneapolis. Founded in 2006 by Julia Borcherts and Bathsheba Birman, Nerds at Heart is the first company in the United States to host singles events specifically for self-identified nerds.

== Activities ==
Nerds at Heart events include Dating for Nerds board game and trivia parties and co-branded Nerderati events that pair singles mixers with local cultural activities. Demographic groups served include heterosexual, LGBT and eco-conscious singles. Annual celebrations include Earth Day, Valentine's Day, International Geek Pride Day and an anniversary appreciation party, Nerd Fest.

Nerds at Heart's media coverage includes the Associated Press, NBC5, The New York Times, and The Today Show. Nerds at Heart was named "Best Dating Phenomenon of 2006" by TimeOut Chicago, and was featured in the documentary Breakup Date.
