= Marylin Bender =

American journalist and author (1925–2020)

- Born: April 25, 1925; Brooklyn, NY
- Died: October 19, 2020 (aged 95); Manhattan, NY
- Other name: Marylin Altschul
- Citizenship: United States
- Education: Smith College (1944), Columbia Law School (1947)
- Occupations: Journalist, author
- Years active: 1951–92
- Employer(s): New York Journal American, Parade, The New York Times
- Known for: First female business editor of The New York Times
- Spouse: Selig Altschul
- Children: James Sloan

Marylin Bender Altschul (April 25, 1925 – October 19, 2020) was an American journalist and author. Bender worked at the New York Journal American, Parade, and The New York Times.. She is known for being the first female business editor of The New York Times. She also authored several books.

== Early life and education ==
Bender grew up in Prospect Park and her family moved to Manhattan when she was young. She graduated from Smith College in 1944 and received a JD from Columbia Law School in 1947.

== Career ==
Bender started her journalism career after school working the dangerous crime beat for the New York Journal American where she covered the Jesús Galíndez kidnapping and murder. She also worked for Parade.

In 1959, Bender joined The New York Times, where she worked for twenty-five years reporting on style and business. Bender was known for reporting on the Jet Set of the day with a sense of detachment and critique.

Her 1967 book The Beautiful People chronicled several well-known names of the era and critiqued modern celebrity culture. That same year, New York City department store Bergdorf Goodman used supersized images of the index pages from the book as a window display.

From 1976 to 1977, Bender edited the New York Times Sunday business and finance section, becoming the section's first female editor. She pioneered reporting on women's issues with Charlotte Curtis and Gloria Emerson. From 1985 until 1991, Bender edited Business World, a supplement to The New York Times Magazine. Bender and her husband, Selig Altschul, were the authors of The Chosen Instrument, an acclaimed history of Pan American Airways and biography of its founder, Juan Trippe.

== Personal life ==
She married Selig Altschul, who was one of the leading financial advisors to the airline industry, in 1959 and had a son, James Sloan, in 1960.

== Awards and honors ==
Bender was elected to the New York Women in Communication's Matrix Hall of Fame in 1972 and received the Smith College Medal in 1978.

== Publications ==
=== Articles ===
- Bender, Marylin (1978). "When the Boss Is a Woman". Esquire.
- ——— (1983). "The Empire and Ego of Donald Trump". The New York Times.

=== Books ===
- Bender, Marylin (1967). The Beautiful People: The Fashion Explosion of the Sixties — From Jacqueline Kennedy to Twiggy. ASIN B001Q8MM7O.
- ——— (1975). At the Top. Doubleday. ISBN 0-38501004-4.
- ———; Altschul, Selig (1982). The Chosen Instrument: Pan Am, Juan Trippe, The Rise and Fall of an American Entrepreneur. Simon and Schuster. ISBN 0-67122464-6.
- ———; Marc, Monsieur (1975). Nouveau is Better Than No Riche at All. Putnam. ISBN 0-39912867-0.
