= Female-led relationship =

Relationship where female partner takes dominant role

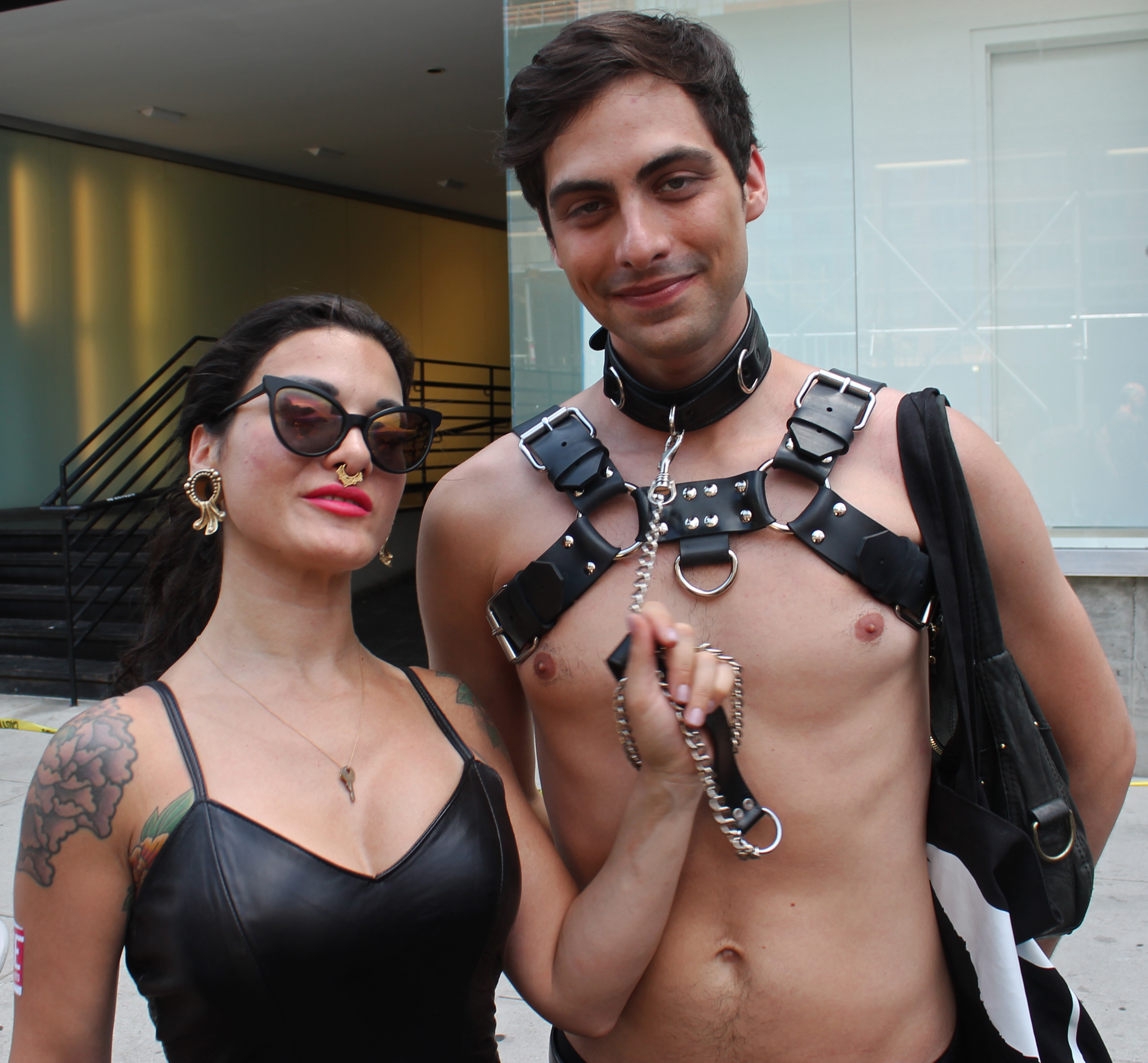
A dominant female and submissive male at Folsom Street East, 2015

A female-led relationship (FLR) is a relationship dynamic often associated with BDSM and kink subcultures, in which the female partner takes on a dominant role. The male partner assumes a submissive role, willingly submitting to her authority, direction, and control.

Unlike temporary role-playing scenarios, FLRs tend to be continuous and practiced around the clock. It differs from naturally developed dynamics in that it is consciously structured around mutually agreed-upon boundaries. Rather than seeking gender equality, an FLR represents an alternative relational model that deliberately inverts traditional heterosexual dynamics in which men have historically held dominance.

== Practice ==
Unlike other forms of roleplay within BDSM and kink that are temporary or situational, an FLR often functions around the clock. It is not limited to sexual activity, but rather extends into the couple's everyday life. It reflects the master/slave dynamic found in some BDSM activities. Psychologist David J. Ley explains that an FLR "is similar to 24/7 BDSM relationships, in that the FLR is typically a full-time relationship style, not limited just to sexy times,". He further notes, "in essence, in FLRs, the female partner steps into a dominant role, where sexuality is completely at her discretion, and the male takes a submissive role, submitting to her direction and control of their sexual relationship". Ley also observes that such relationships may sometimes be consensually non-monogamous, taking forms such as cuckolding or hotwifing, though some others remain monogamous.

Female-led relationships originated in the BDSM and kink communities. FLR is a form of heterosexual dynamic that operates on the premise that men have historically held dominance within relationships. In contrast, FLRs seek to establish an alternative model. Instead of striving for equality between partners, they envision a structure in which the woman assumes the role traditionally occupied by the man. In such relationships, the female partner takes the dominant role in decision-making, control, authority, or sexual dynamics, while the male partner assumes a submissive position. Unlike dynamics that occur naturally, FLRs are typically founded on pre-agreed boundaries. Specifically, these relationship structures tend to be more matriarchal in nature. There are varying levels of FLRs, ranging from those in which the woman holds total control to those characterized by a more subtle dominance. A male partner's level of submission may range from performing acts of service such as household chores to engaging in more intense expressions of submission that may include cock and ball torture. Because such dynamics are niche, FLR enthusiasts often use kink-friendly dating platforms rather than mainstream apps to find compatible partners.

== Pleasurable aspects ==
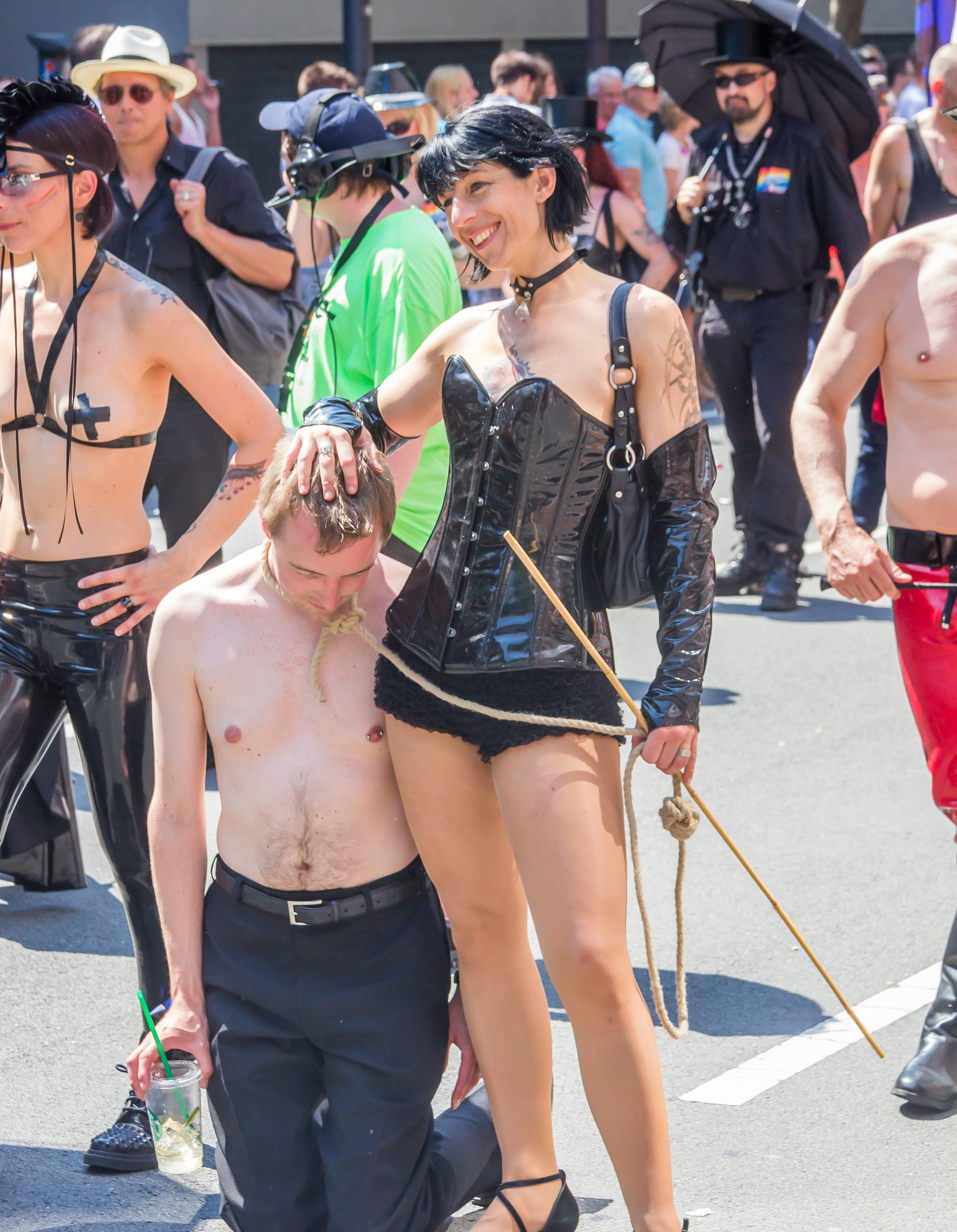
A couple at Cologne Pride, 2013

The appeal of a female-led relationship lies in the consensual exchange of power. For some couples, participation in an FLR becomes an inherent part of their sexual identity. Such relationships may also attract individuals who desire non-traditional relationships that challenge social conventions and reject traditional gender roles or established notions of masculinity and femininity. LGBTQ activist and sex columnist Dan Savage notes, "for some men, sacrificing their male power and privilege is an intrinsic part of the eroticism of submitting to a dominant woman".

In an FLR, the female partner asserts her dominance in various ways. Male partners often wear chastity devices. In some female-led relationships, the sexual dynamic may include practices such as the female partner using a strap-on dildo to peg her male partner, though this varies across relationships. The male partner derives pleasure from humiliation and servitude, and sometimes adopts nicknames that evoke the role of a pet, servant, or object. These dynamics can involve elements of BDSM, including bondage, humiliation, or pain. The couple may engage in facesitting, wax play, sensory deprivation, overstimulation, pegging, cuckoldry, piss play, foot fetish, consensual non-consent, and cock and ball torture, among others. The sex toys brand LELO has noted that "often (but not always), female-led relationships have strong ties to cuckold culture". According to sex therapist Rachel Zar, "if a woman is feeling disempowered in her day-to-day life, being in a female-led relationship can be a wonderful, cathartic way to feel powerful and in control,".

== Views ==
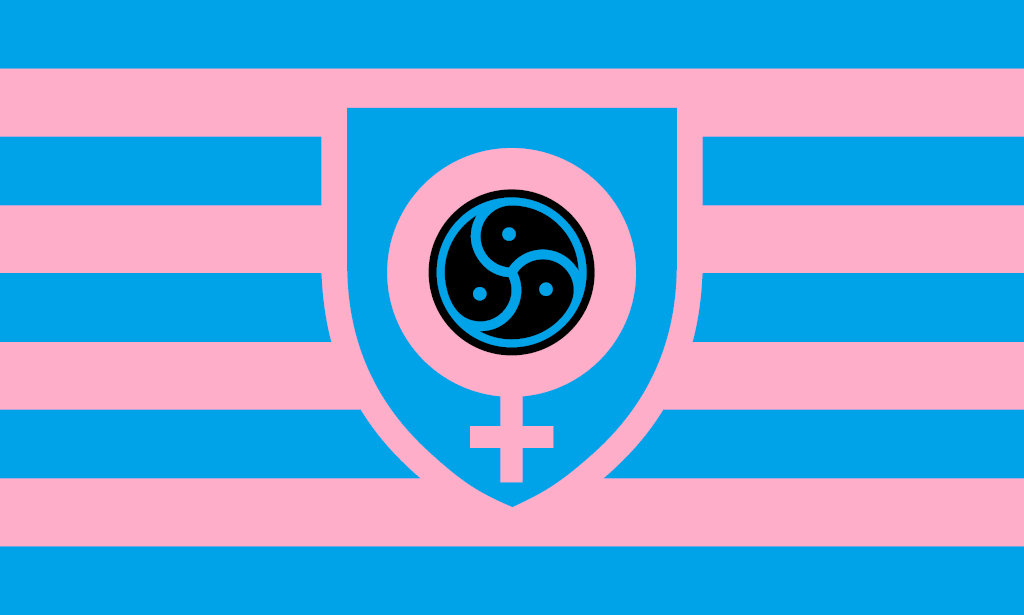
Femdom flag in the Leather subculture

In 2022, Cosmopolitan's sex and relationships editor Megan Wallace noted that, nowadays the term is also used outside BDSM subcultures to describe relationships in which "women are taking more control of relationships due to a context of increased gender equality". The magazine also cited psychologist Rina Bajaj, who stated that "feminism may be an important part of the value system of the relationship or the woman is seen as the head of the household and takes the lead on a wide variety of decisions."

According to feminist sexologist Gigi Engle, "in a world rife with misogyny, [a female-led relationship] allows women and femme humans to assert their dominance in a way that is celebrated. Their male partners (usually cisgender men, but not always), enjoy the subjugation and genuinely take pleasure from being in service to their female partners." Sex columnist Zachary Zane similarly describes FLRs as "flipping the societal heteronormative script for how MF [male/female] relationships manifest ... FLRs have a level of female autonomy ... It can be very fun, rewarding, and empowering to have your partner serve you".

Writing for Business Insider, freelance writer Ashley Laderer stated that in "a patriarchal society, female-led relationships are typically viewed as progressive". Similarly, sex therapist and psychologist Kate Balestrieri explains that a "low control" female-led relationship "may look like a more progressive relationship, and less like an FLR" from an "outsider's view". She adds that such relationships allow women "to feel secure and unafraid of their own power, and without the conflict that comes with trying to find equality".
