= Travel Companion Exchange =

US-based matching service for travel companions (1982–2003)

Travel Companion Exchange (TCE) was a travel companion matching service established by Jens Jurgen in 1982. As the first general interest travel companion matching service in existence, it became the forerunner of many similar services and helped pioneer and legitimize the field of singles matching services in general. It was the largest and most successful of its type at the time.

== History ==
While traveling alone through Europe Jurgen developed the idea for a companion matching service for travelers. He already was operating a similar program for members who shared a common interest in the arts, and he had written several short books on travel subjects. Using the mailing list of those who had contacted him with inquiries about the books, he sent a questionnaire to gauge their interest in finding a travel companion. Met with an overwhelming positive response, he commenced on the larger service.

Initially, his goal was to provide a service that would help travelers save money by sharing expenses, particularly to avoid the single supplement levied by cruise ship operators. He did not at first think that the service would serve as a matchmaker. However, he found that more than 70 percent of his clients either requested companions of the opposite sex or were willing to accept them; fewer than 15 percent wanted private rooms.

He developed a profile questionnaire that identified key personal habits and preferences that would impact on compatibility while traveling. After completing the questionnaire and mailing it to the TCE office, members were mailed a monthly summary of the profiles of all members with current travel plans or desires. They could then request the full profiles and contact information for those they were interested in.

The novelty and utility of the service soon resulted in write-ups in major publications like the Los Angeles Times and Prevention magazine, which generated a flood of inquiries. As a result, the business grew quickly, and within a year it had 2,500 active members in 48 states, Canada, Mexico, Puerto Rico and Japan. By 1997 it had served over 70,000 members. No figures are available for the total number of members it had in the full 20 years it was in operation.

The monthly mailings were accompanied by a newsletter in which Jurgen shared tips drawn from his wealth of experience in the travel sector, and from the contributions of members and other travel professionals. This newsletter was rated by Newsday as "one of the three best general travel newsletters."

The profile was so successful in indicating potentially compatible partners that the service suffered an unusually high turn-over due to members finding a permanent partner and dropping their memberships.

Jurgen operated the business out of his home in Amityville, NY, at first alone, then with staff made necessary by the increased workload. Competing services soon sprang up, and they began to use the Internet, reaching a larger audience at a lower cost. Jurgen, however, resisted transferring TCE to the Web due to his concern over the privacy and safety of his members, citing the difficulty of verifying the identity of online applicants. He did, however, put up home pages which directed visitors to the mailing address and phone numbers of the Amityville office.

Jurgen closed the business in 2003 for personal reasons.

== Founder ==
Originally from Germany, Jurgen was a mechanical engineer who worked for Long Island Light Co. While there, he started the employees' travel program, chartering flights to Europe, and began researching and writing on travel subjects. In 1976, after a divorce, he quit his job and toured Europe in an RV for three years.

Jurgen wrote and self-published several books during his career, including: Guide to Air Charter Groups and Air Travel Bargains (1967) European Car Ferry Services (1971) and Air Travel & Charter Flight Handbook (1973) The latter book led to his being called as an expert witness on air travel matters before a US Senate Committee which ultimately led to the airline deregulation hearings.

These books also brought such a quantity of inquiries by mail that he organized his own charter travel club and operated it until 1973.

He continued to write and publish other travel titles: Charter Flight Directory, subtitled "How To Fly for Less" (1976,1977 and 1978 editions) and 1001 sources for Free Travel Information – Valuable Freebies You Should Know About (1978) Accumulated tips from the TCE newsletter were compiled into a 24-page booklet called Foiling Pickpockets and Other Travel-related Scams (1997 and 2000 editions) which became recognized as the best consumer guide available and Jurgen was frequently quoted in articles on the subject. The titles were all well received by the public, and in total, he sold approximately 120,000 copies of the books.

In 1997, he married Eul Lee, whom he had met through TCE. She became his partner in the business as well – in fact, the demands of the work were such that they could only drive to Philadelphia for a few days for their honeymoon.

== Revival ==
After his retirement, Jurgen retained ownership of the domain names he had used for TCE as well as several other travel related domains. In 2011 he sold the www.travelcompanionexchange.com domain to Brian Eugene, a former member of TCE, who revived it as an Internet-only travel companion matching service.

== See also ==
- Family Travel Forum
