= Lovestruck.com =

English online dating site

Lovestruck.com is an online dating site based in London, United Kingdom. It introduces single professional people who live or work in close proximity to one another. In May 2010, the company launched its iPhone application on iTunes, which vibrates when compatible users are nearby. Brett Harding, the Lovestruck founder, is one of the Courvoisier Future 500.

In 2014, Lovestruck won Dating Website of the Year, Singles Party of the Year, and Dating App of the Year at the UK Dating Awards. In 2015, Lovestruck won the flagship Online Dating Brand of the Year award.
