= The Right Stuff (dating web site) =

Dating site for select university graduates (1993–present)

- Website type: Online dating service
- Owner: privately held
- Website: RightStuffDating.com
- Commercial: Yes
- Registration: Required for membership

The Right Stuff was a dating service in New Jersey, in business 1993-2022. Membership was international and limited to single students, graduates, and faculty of medical schools and of select universities and colleges. TIME Magazine mentioned it in a review of dating services, saying, "If you’re highly educated and seeking a highly educated partner, Right Stuff Dating ('The Ivy League of Dating') may be right for you." According to the Right Stuff web site, as of 2015, there were about 4,900 members, and 310 couples have met and married through the site.

== History and membership ==
The Right Stuff conducted business via paper and United States postal service beginning in 1993. It advertised in magazines such as The New Yorker, Boston, New York, Chicago, and Philadelphia magazines, similar publications in Washington D.C., and California, and university alumni magazines for the target universities. The Right Stuff went to the web in 1997.

Originally, membership was limited to affiliates of Ivy League, the Seven Sisters, MIT, Duke, Northwestern, Stanford, Berkeley, UChicago, and Johns Hopkins. Over time, the list of eligible universities expanded to about 70 top-tier schools and all medical schools.

Competing niche sites targeting high intelligence or graduates of elite universities have either closed entirely, no longer work with current browsers, or are otherwise essentially moribund. These include docdates.com, fastcupid.com, intellectconnect.com, ivydate.com, mymitra.com, and sweetongeeks.com.

Archive.org shows that the web site rightstuffdating.com went dark after September 2023.

== Mechanics of site ==
In July 2015, a six-month membership cost $75.00. The membership was discounted for full-time students, recent graduates, and residents of certain states. The Right Stuff required its members to provide proof of student, graduate, or faculty relationship to one of the listed universities or medical schools.

New members would submit two write-ups. The first was a short 35 to 50-word profile which was visible to all members of the opposite sex. The second was an extended one-page biography that gave a more detailed description of the member's personality and preferences. Members were given web search access to the short profiles of other members, where, based on that search, members could order the one-page extended biographies for $3.10 each. Members could initiate communication through an intra-site email system which allowed members to remain anonymous until they chose to reveal more.

== External sources ==
- Dr. Christie Hartmann, Niche Online Dating Sites for Intellectual Badasses (January 2014)
- Richard Kostalanetz, Why Internet Dating, New English Review (June 2013)
