= Feeld =

Location-based online dating app

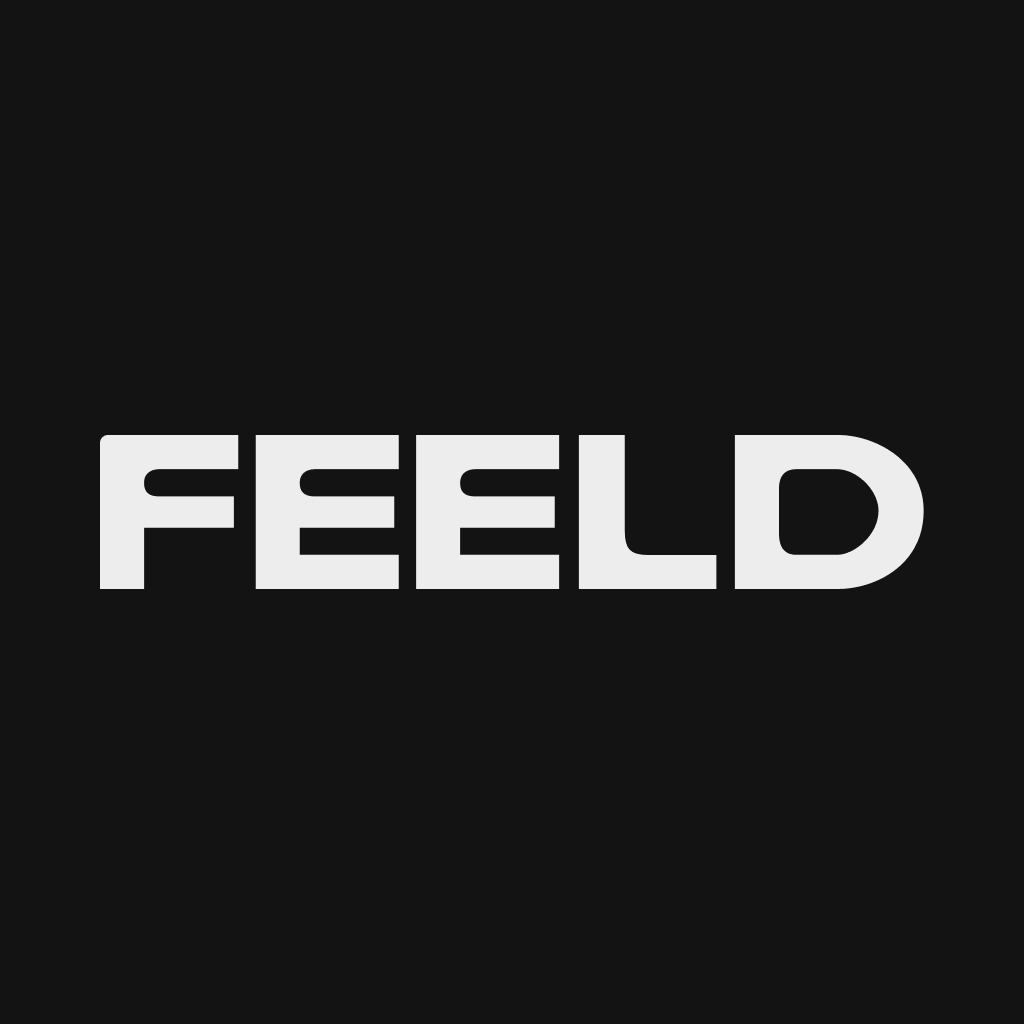
- Other names: 3nder
- Developer: Feeld Ltd.
- Release: July 2014
- Operating system: iOS, Android
- Available in: English, French, German, Portuguese, Spanish
- Type: Social discovery
- License: Proprietary software with Terms of Use
- Website: www.feeld.co

Feeld (previously called 3nder) is a location-based online dating application for iOS and Android aimed at people interested in ethical non-monogamy, polyamory, casual sex, kink, swinging, and other alternative relationship models and sexual preferences. According to The New York Times in 2019, over a third of users are on the app with a partner, and 45% identify as something other than heterosexual.

3nder launched worldwide in July 2014. As of August 1, 2016, it had had over 1.6 million downloads on iOS and its users made 10 million connections a month. Major updates to the interface were released in December 2017, August 2022, and December 2023.

Feeld is developed by Feeld Ltd., an independent remote startup company founded in 2014 by Bulgarian-born designer Dimo Trifonov.

== History ==
Trifonov conceived the app after his girlfriend Ana Kirova told him she had feelings for other people. Once the concept was developed, Trifonov bought a $15 online template to create a holding page and saw immediate demand.

Feeld (initially known as 3nder) received its first seed round from the UK-based group Haatch. The app launched as 3nder in July 2014. In October 2015, 3nder Ltd. received $500,000 in seed funding from a pair of unnamed angel investors.

In May 2016, Tinder's parent company Match Group (a part of IAC) sued 3nder Ltd., alleging trademark infringement over its name. Match Group "wants its smaller competitor to shut down and erase its presence from the web entirely to avoid 'confusion' between the two apps, claiming the alleged similarity gives 3nder an 'unfair advantage'", based on the "supposed pronunciation of 3nder". In August 2016, the app was renamed Feeld.

Dimo Trifonov was CEO until March 2021, when Ana Kirova took over.

=== Availability and security issues ===
In late 2023, the Feeld app experienced a major outage of several days connected to an app update. After the update, many users experienced severe difficulty using the app. Feeld also started to show the real-time location name of its users publicly, a move criticized for its privacy and safety implications. Feeld acknowledged that, after the update, users experienced "several issues that we know are affecting your experience", including problems logging in, accessing connections, and chats and profiles appearing to have been deleted.

Regarding the safety concerns connected to real-life location sharing, CEO Ana Kirova initially suggested in a blog post that concerned users could hide their profiles from other users completely through the app's privacy settings. After a backlash, location sharing was turned off completely.

In March 2024, the British cybersecurity company Fortbridge identified several critical security vulnerabilities in the app. These flaws allowed unauthorized third parties to access private messages and photos, edit user profiles, and search preferences and messages. The vulnerabilities' duration remains unclear. Feeld claimed that the issues were resolved within three months of being identified. Feeld did not directly inform regulators or notify users of the potential breach of their private data, citing an absence of evidence that any data had been accessed. In its report on the investigation, Fortbridge said that six months had passed between their initial disclosure of the vulnerabilities and Feeld's confirmation that the issues had been patched.

== Operation ==
The basic app is free to use to match with and message with other members, with optional in-app purchases available for additional features.

Members sign into the app using their email address, Sign in with Apple, or Facebook. They build their profile, choosing between 20 sexuality and 19 gender options, and can pair their account with a partner's. Users can choose whom they want to see (singles, couples, genders) and refine their search based on geographical search area, age, relationship type, and sexual preferences. The app then presents other users' profiles to look at.

Liking or Disliking indicate interest or disinterest in another's profile, and, uniquely for dating apps, users can decide to skip a profile to make a choice later. When two users like each other, they become "Connections" and can message each other.

As well as showing other members around them, the app offers the ability to visit and meet members far away through "Locations". It also offers Virtual Locations as a way to connect over like-minded interests, regardless of geographical location.

=== In-app purchases ===
Feeld has a subscription-based paid tier called Majestic, which gives users additional features that allow them to have more control over searches, privacy, and seeing likes.

Members may send "Pings" to immediately notify another member of their interest without having to wait for the other person to see them and like them back. Pings can be acquired as in-app purchases.

There is also a paid feature called "Uplift", which allows members to be shown ahead of other profiles in their area for some time, decreasing the time it will take to connect with others.

== See also ==
- Timeline of online dating services
- Comparison of online dating services
