= SpeedDate.com =

Speed dating website

SpeedDate.com is a speed dating website started by two Stanford graduates, Simon Tisminezky and Dan Abelon after an entrepreneurship class at Stanford Business School co-taught by Eric Schmidt.

== History ==
Originally a Stanford University business class project, Speeddate.com combines online dating and round robin-style speed dating, where singles spend five minutes or less connecting live with potential matches. The domain was acquired in 2007 and since its launch in late 2007, SpeedDate.com has hosted over 60 million online speed dates. Within an hour, users meet up to 15 people using live video and instant messaging. Each date lasts three minutes, after which users can continue the conversation or chat with someone else. SpeedDate secured U.S. Patent Number 7,203,674 covering key aspects of online speed dating.

Online dating site SpeedDate has raised $6 million in a Series B funding round led by Menlo Ventures.

== Applications ==
SpeedDate.com has applications on iPhone, iPad, Android, Facebook, MySpace, Bebo and Meebo. SpeedDate.com is a freemium service and its revenue comes from premium subscriptions.
