= Dating Sunday =

Online dating cultural trend

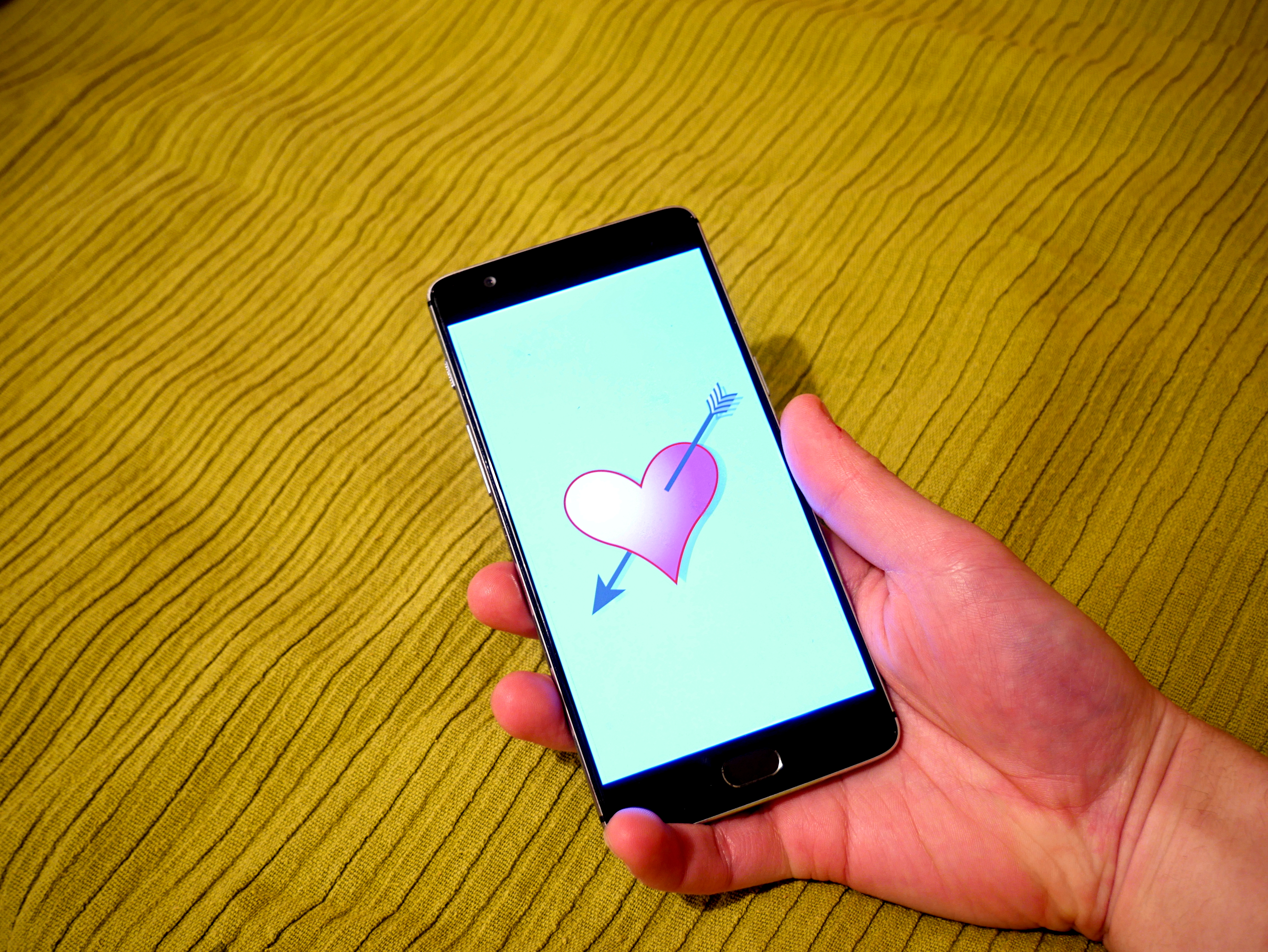
Dating Sunday involves online dating apps on the first Sunday of the year

Dating Sunday, or Singles Sunday, is a superficial and unofficial holiday name for the first Sunday after New Year's Day when online dating websites and apps are the busiest and see the highest activity and signups from people desiring to connect with someone. It is sometimes called "a national holiday for single daters" or "Super Bowl Sunday for love".

== Origins ==
The day was first coined by an online dating service Match.com in 2014. It is hypothesized that Dating Sunday is not on New Year's Day, but on a Sunday due to people returning home from holiday travel and being in the mindset to focus on themselves. It is also reported that Match found "51% of singles’ New Year's resolutions will be to ... focus on finding that special someone".

It is speculated that Dating Sunday exists because of "a mix of New Year’s resolutions, post-holiday breakups and Valentine’s Day around the corner", making it the "first lonely holiday after the New Year" after December, a month reportedly being "proposal season". Furthermore, Tinder, an online dating app, reportedly names the entire season from New Year's Day to February 13 (the day before Valentine's Day) "Swipe Season”.

It is sometimes noted that Dating Sunday is a "sort of ouroboros" as an arbitrary day created by another arbitrary day of Valentine's Day.

== Statistics ==
Various dating websites and apps have reported increased activity or memberships using different statistics. In 2019, Match expected "an 80% increase in new users on the website on Sunday – in 2019, the site saw a 69% jump on Dating Sunday". For Tinder in 2024, "20 per cent more messages are sent when compared to the daily average over a year". Moreover, Tinder has reportedly 44 million matches made on "Dating Sunday" in 2017 when a typical day on the site is around 26 million matches. On user response time, Tinder also reportedly observes 20-minute faster average response time on Dating Sunday, indicating higher user engagement. For Hinge in 2024, it was reported they had "a 27% increase in likes sent on this day and a 29% rise in messages sent". For CoffeeMeetsBagel observed in 2018 "a 75% spike in new-user sign ups" and in 2019 reported "a 61% increase in new user signups, a 16% increase in activity or number of sessions, a 22% increase in matches, and a 23% increase in chats, compared to the past 30 days". It is reported that Plenty of Fish "[saw] sign-ups jump 24% over the course of the day, with the peak happening around 6 p.m. ET on the first Sunday of the year". For Bumble in 2020, they expected "a 30% increase in new users this Sunday alone, along with a 15% increase in user activity compared to an average day" and 2023 "matches increased by 40 per cent from Christmas Eve to Dating Sunday". For How About We in 2014, "its membership rises 40 percent in January and February". Also in 2014, for ChristianMingle.com, it is reported that new membership signups increased 41 percent around Dating Sunday between Christmas and Valentine's Day. OkCupid reportedly sees a 70 percent increase in user activity on Dating Sunday. For The League, it is reported they "saw 38% more messages and 53% more matches". Compared with all other Sundays, downloading OkCupid on Dating Sunday is "significantly higher than those other Sundays".

== See also ==
- Cuffing season
- Online dating
