= Swiped: Hooking Up in the Digital Age =

- Poster
- Written by: Nancy Jo Sales
- Directed by: Nancy Jo Sales
- Music by: Tyler Strickland
- Country of origin: United States
- Original language: English

Production
- Producers: Carly Hugo; Matt Parker; Nancy Jo Sales
- Running time: 87 min
- Production companies: Consolidated Documentary Studios; HBO Documentary Films

Original release
- Network: HBO
- Release: September 10, 2018

Swiped: Hooking Up in the Digital Age is an American documentary film that premiered on September 10, 2018 on HBO. Directed by journalist Nancy Jo Sales, the film explores dating, relationships, and hookup culture amongst young people in the era of online dating apps.

The documentary is an extension of a 2015 article Sales did for Vanity Fair on online dating titled "Tinder and the Dawn of the Dating Apocalypse", which went viral and attracted criticism from Tinder itself.

== Synopsis ==
Sales follows six young people of diverse backgrounds ranging in age from 18 to 29 in four regions across America—New York City, Southern California, Austin, and the Midwest—and asks them about their experiences of online dating and what they think about the current state of dating culture. The subjects' experiences range from positive to negative, the latter in particular highlighted with the dangers of nude photos and revenge porn.

Sales also talks to academics and experts about the social ramifications of young people's access to seemingly unlimited choices in partners and dating. The documentary includes interviews with the creators of popular dating apps, including Jonathan Badeen, co-founder of Tinder; Whitney Wolfe Herd, founder and CEO of Bumble; Justin McLeod, founder and CEO of Hinge; and Mandy Ginsberg, CEO of Match Group, which owns Tinder, OkCupid and other dating sites.

== Reception ==
In a review for The Guardian, Joel Golby wrote, "At times, Swiped feels as if it is trying to paint too broad a picture of dating in 2018: some of the 'expert voices' explaining normal behaviour sound like a documentary from 1998 where an awkward man in a jumper slowly explains that you have to 'log on' to 'surf the world wide web'. It is doomed to age fairly rapidly as a result. But as a snapshot of dating right this very second, it is a capable one".

Writing for Vogue, Bridget Read said a highlight of the film was its findings about "the 'gameification' of dating, via technological features like speed and ease of use, notifications, rewards, and add-ons" Read also opined the documentary needed more generational context and insight into the oversight of tech companies and apps.

Writing for Salon, TV critic Melanie McFarland called Swiped "illuminating, fascinating, depressing and horrifying."

In Business Insider, Nathan McAlone wrote that "[t]he first thing that jumps out about 'Swiped' is how gifted an interviewer Sales is. Much of the doc revolves around interviews with 18 to 25-year-olds who talk about their experiences using various dating apps. Sales said she wanted broad representation of diverse voices and she certainly succeeds. The interviews veer from sweet to sad to mildly sociopathic–but their defining quality is candor, which is a testament to Sales' technique."

Writing for Marie Claire, Cady Drell said that "[Swiped's] most lasting message was sort of about corporate responsibility. As in: Do the corporations who get us onto dating apps have a responsibility to make them safe and conducive to healthy relationships? Sales argues that they do... The second point from Swiped that rings true–and it's tied into the conversation about capitalism–is that women put an inordinate amount of work into the mechanics of dating, relative to men."

"'Swiped' is a very good film with a very simple message: the technology may have changed and convoluted things, but the learning curve of romance is about the same: it's complicated," wrote Omar Gallaga in Book and Film.
