= Cuffing =

Cuffing may refer to:

- Handcuffing
- Peribronchial cuffing
- Cuffing season, a time of year in colder months where singles seek out to be in a relationship, derived from the slang term "cuffing" which is metaphorically attaching oneself to another
- Job cuffing

== See also ==
- Cuffing season (disambiguation)
