= Lorenz Bogaert =

Belgian media entrepreneur (born 1976)

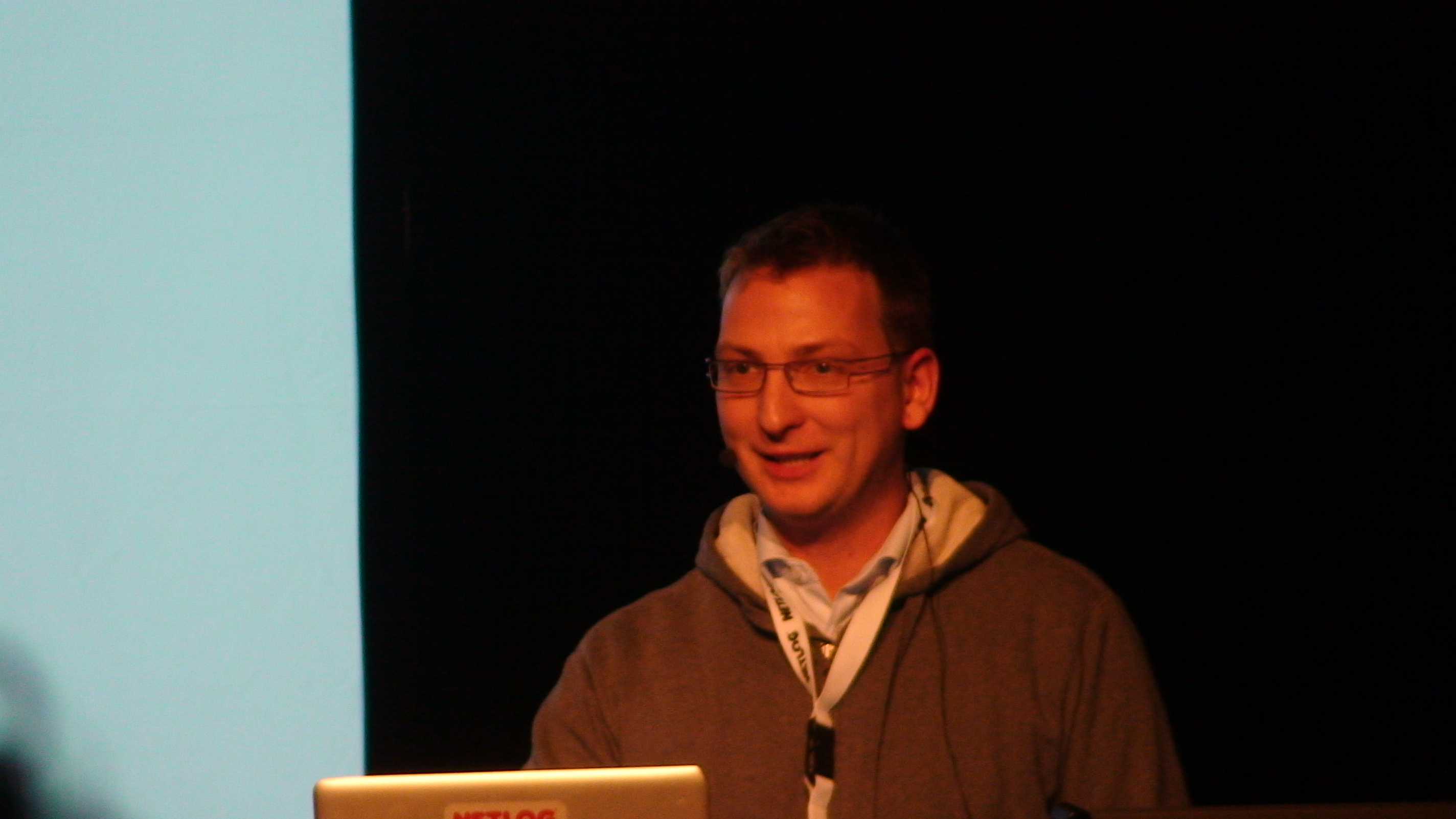
- Lorenz Bogaert
- Born: 1976 (age 49–50)
- Education: Universities of Brussels (BE)
- Occupation: Media entrepreneur

Lorenz Bogaert, born 1976, is a Belgian serial Internet entrepreneur. He is co-founder of Massive Media, a social media company owning digital brands such as social networking services Netlog and Ablo and social dating community Twoo. Lorenz lives in Ghent.

== Education ==
Bogaert studied law and management at the universities of Brussels (BE), Fribourg (CH) and Namur (BE).

== Career ==
In 2012 Massive Media was acquired by Meetic, now part of internet holding company IAC. Bogaert is also co-founder of cryptocurrency portfolio application Delta, which was acquired by eToro in 2019 and he was involved in launching expense management scale-up Rydoo, acquired by Sodexo in 2017. Another company founded by Bogaert is proptech scale-up Realo of which he is executive chairman. In 2019 he was listed as the 4th most important angel investor in Belgium by Antwerp Management School.

Bogaert was awarded Young Entrepreneur of the Year in 2008.
