= Twoo.com =

2011–2022 social network

Twoo
- Website type: Social network service
- Available in: Albanian, Arabic, Bulgarian, Chinese, Croatian, Czech, Danish, Dutch, English, Estonian, Finnish, French, German, Greek, Hebrew, Hungarian, Indonesian, Italian, Japanese, Korean, Latvian, Lithuanian, Malaysian, Norwegian, Polish, Portuguese, Romanian, Russian, Slovak, Slovenian, Serbian, Spanish, Swedish, Tagalog, Thai, Turkish, Ukrainian, Vietnamese
- Owner: Massive Media
- Website: www.twoo.com
- Commercial: Free, with the option for a paid subscription
- Registration: Required
- Launched: 2011
- Current status: Discontinued on June 30, 2022

Twoo or Twoo.com was a social discovery platform launched in 2011 by Massive Media. Users create profiles, upload pictures and chat with other users. The website and app is available in 38 languages and counted 181 million users in 200 countries in December 2016. Twoo announced that they will shut down on June 30, 2022, alerting users of this by way of pop-up notices when the users log in. Users were migrated to POF (Plenty of Fish).

== History ==
In 2011, Toon Coppens and Lorenz Bogaert launched the dating website Twoo in Ghent, Belgium. Their company Massive Media previously founded Netlog.

In August 2012, TechCrunch reported accusations of Twoo forwarding invitations to its users' email contacts using spamming methods. According to the 2013 follow-up report, Twoo was still using questionable spamming methods to get new user registrations, with users complaints about unsolicited emails from Twoo, Twoo messaging all of their contacts, and unclear account deletion procedures.

In December 2012, Massive Media was acquired by the Meetic Group. In 2013, this French dating company was acquired by InterActive Corp owner of the Match Group.

In 2013, Twoo acquired Stepout, a dating site that had become very popular in India, having been founded in 2008 in the US as "Ignighter", focused on group dates.

In August 2015, the social questions-and-answers service Spring.me became a Twoo.com portal. Users were automatically migrated to Twoo's dating service, creating "shell accounts" for the dating site from their Q&A site accounts. This move, along with accusations of fake accounts, raised ethical and legal questions about the company's conduct.

On 30 June 2022, Twoo was discontinued.

== See also ==
- Timeline of online dating services
- Comparison of online dating services
