= OkCupid =

American online dating service

- OkCupid logo
- Website type: Online dating service
- Owner: Match Group
- Creators: Chris Coyne; Sam Yagan; Christian Rudder; Max Krohn
- CEO: Ariel Charytan
- Website: okcupid.com
- Commercial: Yes
- Registration: Required for membership
- Launched: January 19, 2004; 22 years ago
- Current status: Active

OkCupid (often abbreviated as OKC, but officially OkC) is a U.S.-based, internationally operating online dating, friendship, and formerly also a social networking website and application. It features multiple-choice questions to match members. Registration is free. OkCupid is owned by Match Group, which also owns Tinder, Hinge, Plenty of Fish, and many other popular dating apps and sites.

While the site and app once supported multiple modes of communication, this has been restricted to messaging. OkCupid was listed in Time magazine's 2007 Top 10 dating websites. The website was acquired by IAC's Match.com division in 2011.

== History ==
OkCupid was originally owned by Humor Rainbow, Inc. OkCupid's founders (Chris Coyne, Christian Rudder, Sam Yagan, and Max Krohn) were students at Harvard University when they gained recognition for their creation of TheSpark and, later, SparkNotes. Among other things, TheSpark.com featured a number of humorous self-quizzes and personality tests, including the four-variable Myers-Briggs style Match Test. SparkMatch debuted as a beta experiment of allowing registered users who had taken the Match Test to search for and contact each other based on their Match Test types. The popularity of SparkMatch took off and it was launched as its own site, later renamed OkCupid. In 2001, they sold SparkNotes to Barnes & Noble, and began work on OkCupid.

In November 2007, OkCupid launched Crazy Blind Date, a no-cost dating service that set people up on blind dates with little to no notice. The site served people in Boston, San Francisco, Austin, New York City, Chicago, Washington, D.C., and Los Angeles. Daters would complete an optional questionnaire about their availability, preferred neighborhood for dates and their preferred type of date. They would meet up at an agreed upon location without knowing how their date would look ahead of time. In April 2010, Time Out reported that the website was under construction for updates, but would remain free once it resumed operation. In 2013, it was relaunched and integrated into the OkCupid platform as an app for iPhone and Android devices.

In 2008, OkCupid spun off its test-design portion under the name Hello Quizzy (HQ), while keeping it inextricably linked to OkCupid and reserving existent OkCupid users' names on HQ. However, the original Dating Persona Test has since been removed.

Since August 2009, an "A-list" account option is available to users of OkCupid and provides additional services for monthly fees.

In February 2011, OkCupid was acquired by IAC/InterActiveCorp, operators of Match.com, for US$50 million. Editorial posts from 2010 by an OkCupid founder in which Match.com and pay-dating were criticized for exploiting users and being "fundamentally broken" were removed from the OkCupid blog at the time of the acquisition. In a press response, OkCupid's CEO explained that the removal was voluntary.

In November 2012, OkCupid launched the social discovery service Tallygram, but retired the service in April 2013.

On March 31, 2014, any user accessing OkCupid from the web browser Firefox was presented with a message asking users to boycott Firefox due to Mozilla Corporation's new CEO Brendan Eich's support of Proposition 8. Users were asked instead to consider other browsers. On April 2, 2014, the dating site revoked the Firefox ban.

The website added a bevy of nontraditional profile options for users to express their gender identity and sexuality in late 2014. These options—which included asexual, genderfluid, pansexual, sapiosexual, and transgender categories—were added to make the website more inclusive. Through this addition, OkCupid popularized the concept of "sapiosexuality", meaning romance or sexual attraction based on intellectual, rather than physical, traits. OkCupid removed the Sapiosexual identity on February 11, 2019, following considerable negative feedback, specifically quoting an article on Vice Magazine.

In January 2018, OkCupid appointed Ariel Charytan, who was formerly senior vice president of audiobook and podcast company Audible, as CEO.

In September 2018, OkCupid became the first dating app to create a dedicated space on profiles for LGBTQ daters to share their pronouns, and expanded that feature to all users in July 2020.

In June 2020, OkCupid released a feature "stacks" that allows app users to view and sort matches based on categories including nearby, online, questions pros, recommended and match percentage. Paid users can additionally sort by new or popular people.

In May 2021, the company launched a monthly blog series, called Dating Data Center, which shared data from OkCupid matching questions and responses. In that same month, OkCupid found that daters, coming out of the 2019 Coronavirus Pandemic, were looking for long-term relationships, negating the commonly held theories of a "hot vaxxed summer" (a play on Megan Thee Stallion single Hot Girl Summer) in which daters were looking exclusively for casual relationships. In June 2021, OkCupid expanded identity options for LGBTQ+ users, with more than 60 identity options, including 20 sexual orientations and 22 gender options.

== Reviews ==
Despite being a platform designed to be less centered on physical appearance, OkCupid co-founder Christian Rudder stated in 2009 that the male OkCupid users who were rated most physically attractive by female OkCupid users received 11 times as many messages as the lowest-rated male users did, the medium-rated male users received about four times as many messages, and the one-third of female users who were rated most physically attractive by the male users received about two-thirds of all messages sent by male users. Additionally, a study published in the August 2018 edition of Science Advances by researchers at the University of Michigan and the Santa Fe Institute found that users of an unnamed, popular, and free online dating service in New York City, Boston, Chicago, and Seattle typically pursued potential partners ranked on average 25 percent more desirable than they were (as measured by the PageRank algorithm). Coupled with data released by the dating app Tinder showing that only 26 million of the 1.6 billion swipes that the app records per day actually result in matches (despite users spending on average about an hour and a half per day on the app), an article published in the December 2018 issue of The Atlantic concluded "Unless you are exceptionally good-looking, the thing online dating may be best at is sucking up large amounts of time."

== Experimenting on users ==
In 2014, OkCupid revealed in a blog post that experiments were routinely conducted on OkCupid users. The site revealed that one experiment included removing users' profile pictures on January 15, 2013 ("Love is Blind Day") and analyzed user responses to messages, conversations, and contact details. When the photos were restored, users who had started "blind" conversations gradually began tapering off their conversations, leading OkCupid's CEO Christian Rudder to remark "it was like we'd turned on the bright lights at the bar at midnight". In a separate A/B test, OkCupid used a placebo number instead of users' true match percentage. The results suggested that doing this caused users, who were "bad matches" under the original algorithm, to actually like each other: "When we tell people they are a good match, they act as if they are."

From Rudder's perspective, it would have been unethical not to experiment on users:

I think part of what's confusing people about this experiment is the result ... this is the only way to find this stuff out [what actually works for a dating site], if you guys have an alternative to the scientific method I'm all ears.

== Controversies ==
=== 2016 data scraping and release ===
In May 2016, a team of Danish researchers made publicly available the "OkCupid dataset" project, containing (as of May 2016) 2,620 variables describing 68,371 users on OkCupid for research purposes (e.g., for psychologists investigating the social psychology of dating). The data release spurred criticism, and an investigation by the Danish Data Protection Authority.

=== 2017 switch to using real names from pseudonyms ===
In December 2017, OkCupid rolled out a change that would require users to provide their real first name in place of a pseudonym as was previously encouraged. Although the company explained this badly, and quickly had to explain that a full name wasn't needed, and that nicknames or initials would be acceptable, the announcement was received with widespread criticism and condemnation for potentially raising the risk of harassment of individuals, especially women and minorities, to doxing. It was pointed out that, unlike other dating sites that encourage the use of first names, OkCupid "encourages long profiles full of intimate details, including candid answers to questions about sex and politics", making connecting that information with a real name more problematic to users.

=== Profile censorship ===
In 2017 OkCupid reported on Twitter that they had removed Christopher Cantwell's user profile for being a white supremacist after a woman reported receiving a message from him. This raised questions from some users who wondered about the ease with which the company could eliminate users from its platform.

=== User photos for data mining ===
In 2014, OkCupid shared without user consent images of users with Clarifai, a start-up specializing in computer vision, to build a face database, due to common founders in both companies. OkCupid settled claims with the Federal Trade Commission in March 2026 over the issue.

=== 2019 alleged credential stuffing incident ===
A February 2019 report alleged that many users reported lost access to their accounts in a manner consistent with either a data breach or a widespread "credential stuffing" incident. "Credential stuffing" describes using passwords stolen from one service (like another dating site) to attack another service, on the assumption that many people will reuse passwords across websites. OkCupid denied any data breach or system errors.

== Overview ==
OkCupid claimed 3.5 million active users as of September 2010. According to Compete.com, the website attracted 1.3 million unique visitors in February 2011.

Any adult may join the site and all users may communicate with others via private messages or an instant messaging "chat" function. OkCupid was the first major dating site to offer unlimited messaging free of charge, although this was limited in late 2017 when OkCupid's official blog announced the site is "getting rid of open-messaging" and making sent messages invisible to the sender until the recipient interacts by either matching or replying to the message. Recipients will be able to read their messages (from people within their preference settings that have not already been passed) before a match by way of an "Intro" tab. All messages under that tab are blurry and must be processed one at a time. The term "A-List" to describe paying members was updated to "Basic" and "Premium" services. People who pay for access will see no advertising and will have an unlimited ability to "Like" other profiles. Those paying for Premium have the additional option of being able to see the list of names for people who have liked them.

In early May 2020, OKCupid removed the match search function for some users, including all those in Australia and including A-list subscribers. Following complaints, it has had to reimburse Australian users but, regardless of past complaints, implemented the removal for all users in July 2020.

Amid the coronavirus pandemic, OkCupid reported a 23.4% decrease in monthly active users in the final quarter of 2020.

== Matching ==
To generate matches, OkCupid applies data generated by users' activities on the site, as well as their answers to questions. Over 4000 questions can be answered and the company suggest answering between 50 and 100 to get started. When answering a question, a user indicates their own answer, the answers they would accept from partners, and the level of importance they place on the question. The results of these questions can be hidden, or made visible to other users. OkCupid describes in generic terms the algorithm used to calculate match percentages. All users are notified of a match, with paying subscribers receiving the user name along with the notification. Subscribers who pay for the "Premium" level of service will also see the profile name if someone "Likes" that user. Match percentage is determined by match questions you've answered, how important users marked them, age, location, gender, orientation, and other factors listed in their "Preferences". Even if someone has answered little or no match questions, they may still see a high percentage match with them if their other preferences align with one another.

=== Criticism ===
There is no function to remove answers to Questions, they can only be modified. Nor is there a way to bulk reset all answers before account deletion. This may cause privacy problems for users who wish to leave an empty account before they delete it to avoid it being used for data monetization by OkCupid. However, user commented questions are listed under "EXPLAINED" which makes it possible to manually delete the comments.

== See also ==
- Bye Felipe
- Comparison of online dating services
- Cupid Media
- Timeline of online dating services
