= Her (dating app) =

American dating app for lesbian, queer and bisexual women and non-binary people

HER
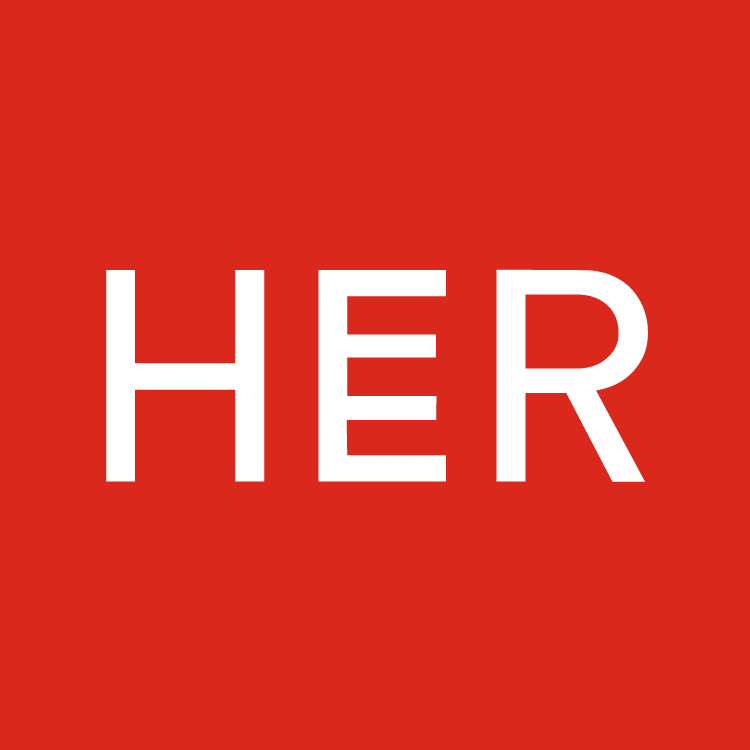
- Developer: Dattch Ltd.
- Release: June 2015
- Stable release: 6.7.6 (iOS) / December 12, 2019; 6 years ago
- Preview release: 3.01.19 (Android) / December 10, 2019; 6 years ago
- Operating system: iOS 10, Android 8.0
- Size: iOS: 54.6 MB; Android: 35.4 MB
- Type: Dating app
- Website: weareher.com

Her is an American dating and community app for the lesbian, queer, bisexual and sapphic community. It was designed for women, non-binary people, and transgender people (including trans men and trans women). It is available for iOS and Android.

The app has features designed for the LGBTQ+ community, such as Pride Pins, sexuality and gender labelling and a community for identities and interests and event listings.

== History ==
The app was founded by Robyn Exton and launched in September 2013 under the name of Dattch. It was originally dubbed a lesbian app.

It was originally designed after Exton was inspired by Grindr, the app for gay men. The idea was "born from Ms Exton's frustration with existing lesbian dating websites and apps, which she didn't think were good enough. She says the market was dominated by "dating sites that were initially created for gay men, and tuned [sic] pink for lesbians". After releasing it she learned that women were looking for a different user journey and decided to build the first dating user journey truly designed for women.

In 2015 HER was launched globally, clinching publicity from publications such as TechCrunch and Washington Post.

== Investors ==
In March 2013, Her (then Dattch) received €40,000 in funding upon joining the start-up incubator Wayra Academy, owned by Telefonica.

In September 2013, the application raised £100,000 from three investors including founder of W3 Ltd, Yannick Pons and Investor & Chairman of YPlan Andy Phillipps.

In March 2014, Dattch received a US$25,000 investment prize after being awarded with Best Design at 2014's LAUNCH Festival.

In March 2015, after $1 million in funding from investors such as Alexis Ohanian, and Garry Tan and Michael Birch from Y Combinator, Dattch was renamed to Her.

In May 2025, Her was acquired by Match Group.

== Reception ==
Her has been well received by LGBTQ communities. In ReadWrite's article, "Why Queer Women Need Their Own Dating App," Dattch was called "one of its kind" and "the app queer women have been waiting for." Lesbian news portal Autostraddle said, "it is a pleasure seeing technology created with women's needs being considered so carefully."

== Cultural references ==
HER was featured on the Tamron Hall show in 2021 with Exton being surprised by a lesbian couple that met on the app and later married.
