= Sam Yagan =

American Internet entrepreneur (born 1977)

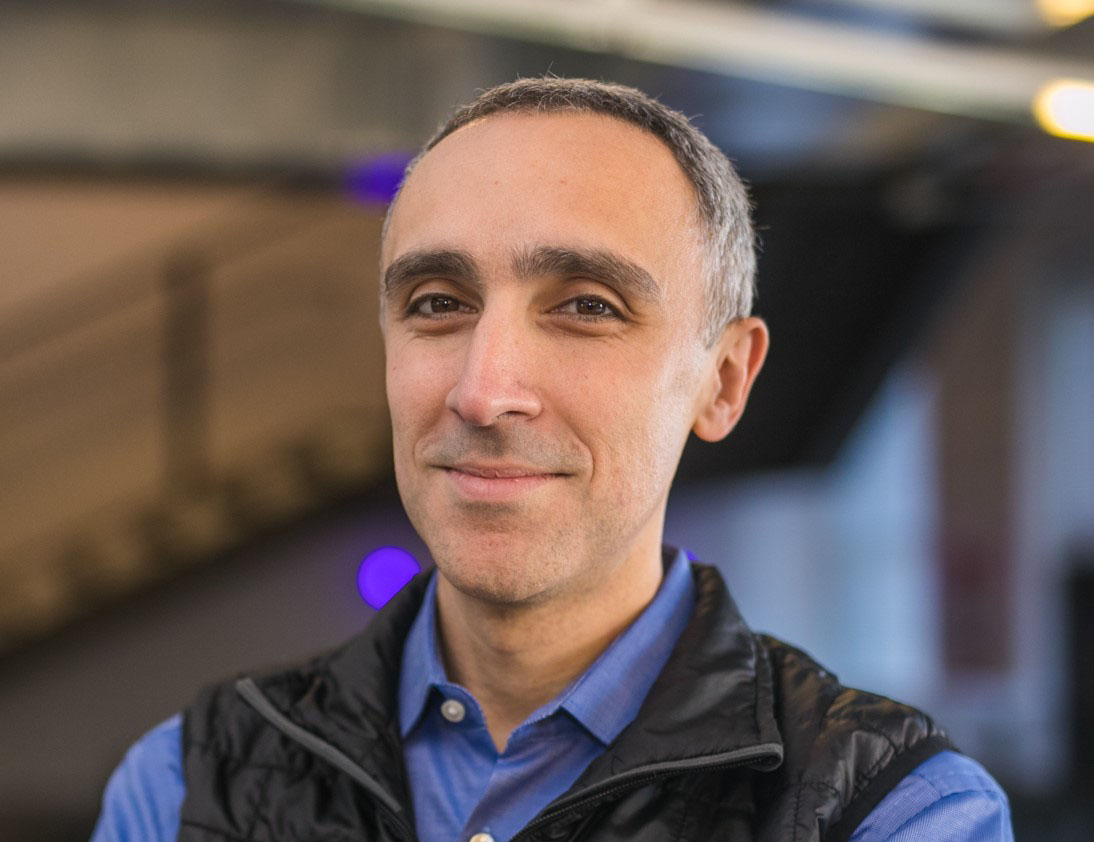
- Born: April 10, 1977 (age 49); Chicago, Illinois, U.S.
- Education: Harvard University; Stanford University
- Occupations: Co-founder of OkCupid; Co-founder of SparkNotes; Vice-Chairman of Match.com; Former CEO of Shoprunner
- Years active: 1999–present
- Spouse: Jessica Droste Yagan (m. 2003)
- Children: 3

Sam Yagan (born April 10, 1977) is an American Internet entrepreneur best known as the co-founder of OkCupid. Time named Yagan one of the 100 most influential people in the world in 2013. He is the co-founder and managing director of Corazon Capital.

== Family and education ==
Yagan is the son of Syrian immigrants, Al and Dr. Haifa Yagan, and grew up in Bourbonnais, Illinois; he studied at Bradley-Bourbonnais Community High School, Illinois Math and Science Academy, Harvard College, and eventually Stanford Graduate School of Business.

Yagan holds a bachelor's degree in Applied Mathematics and Economics from Harvard University and an MBA from Stanford University, where he earned distinction as a Siebel Scholar, an Arjay Miller Scholar, and the Henry Ford Scholar, the award granted to each class's valedictorian. His brother Danny Yagan is an economics professor at the University of California, Berkeley. His wife Jessica Droste Yagan is the CEO of Impact Engine, an impact investing fund.

== Career ==
In 1999, during his senior year at Harvard, Yagan and his classmates, Chris Coyne, Max Krohn, and Christian Rudder started TheSpark.com, which would later be known as SparkNotes. In 2000, Yagan and partners sold SparkNotes to iTurf for $30 million. The partners then helped iTurf sell the site again to Barnes & Noble. in 2001. After the sale, Yagan then stayed at Barnes & Noble for a year.

eDonkey was a part of MetaMachine Inc and was a peer-to-peer (P2P) file-sharing network. Yagan was the CEO of MetaMachine Inc. As the developer of eDonkey, Yagan testified before the Senate Judiciary Committee expressing a need for balance between innovation and intellectual property.

In 2006, MetaMachine, Yagan, and founder Jed McCaleb agreed to pay $30 million to avoid potential copyright infringement lawsuits brought by the RIAA. In accordance with the agreement, MetaMachine, Yagan and McCaleb agreed to discontinue distribution of its software as well as to deprecate previous copies of its software.

In 2003, Yagan again teamed up with his Harvard classmates Chris Coyne, Max Krohn, and Christian Rudder to found online dating website OkCupid. Yagan and partners designed OkCupid with a question-and-answer-based system. In 2011, Yagan led the sale of OkCupid to Match Group, a subsidiary of IAC, for $50 million. Yagan was the CEO of Match Group for three years and left at the end of 2015 before joining the company's public board as vice chairman. While Yagan was CEO, Match Group started Tinder.

In 2009, Yagan, Kelli Rhee, and Kapil Chaudhary co-founded Excelerate Labs with the financial backing from Sandbox Industries. Excelerate Labs merged with Techstars in 2013.

In 2014, Yagan co-founded Corazon Capital with Steve Farsht.

In 2016, Yagan became the CEO of ShopRunner, an e-commerce network that provides two-day shipping across multiple merchants that was founded by Michael Rubin. He led the sale of the company to FedEx in December 2020. Yagan shut down ShopRunner's office in San Mateo, California, and established its headquarters in Chicago. He attributed this move to the labor market and ability to recruit.

=== Board memberships ===
Yagan has participated on the board for several companies including Grindr, Match Group, Rush University Medical Center, Start Early, Shiftgig, SpotHero, Tinder, and Techstars.

== Recognition ==
Time named Yagan one of the 100 most influential people in the world in 2013. In 2011, Yagan was named to Crain's "40 under 40" in Chicago.

== Personal life ==
Sam Yagan is married to his high school sweetheart, Jessica Droste Yagan. They have three children. Yagan and his wife started the Yagan Family Foundation.
