= Cuffing season (disambiguation) =

Cuffing season is typically defined as the time of year when single people search for romantic partners.

Cuffing season may also refer to:

- Cuffing Season, a 2015 studio album by Eric Bellinger
- "Cuffing Season", an alternative name for the 2020 Big Boys (song)
- "Cuffing Season", a 2020 song by Beach Bunny from Honeymoon
- "Cuffing Season", a 2023 song by Laura Jane Grace from Hole in My Head
- "Cuffing Season", a 2024 single by Isabela Merced

== See also ==
- Cuffing (disambiguation)
