= Ablo =

Social networking service

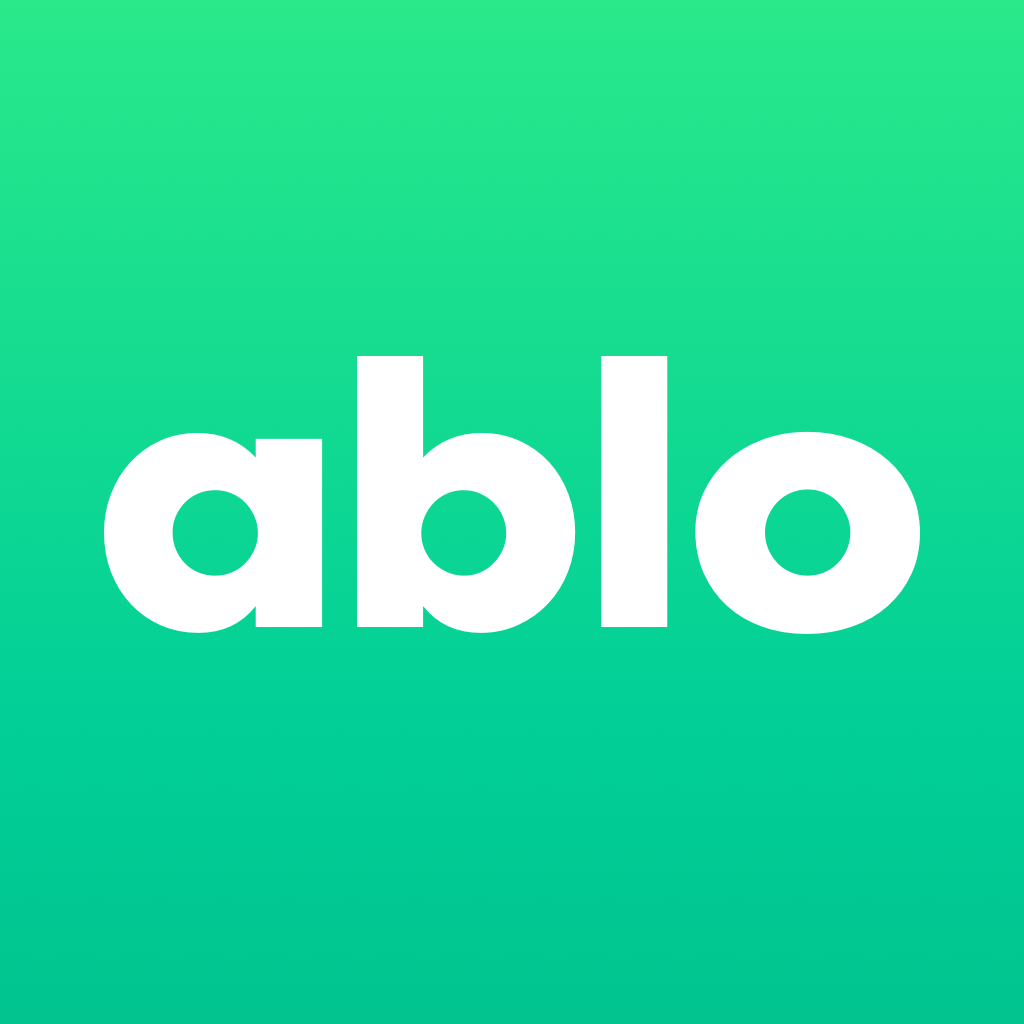
- Website type: Instant messaging, Social network
- Owner: Massive Media
- Website: ablo.live
- Launched: January 2019
- Current status: Closed

Ablo was a social networking service for instant communications. It enabled users to communicate with people from anywhere in the world by having live one-to-one text and video conversations, using an automated translation feature.

Ablo was owned by Massive Media, a Belgium-based company founded in 2011. Massive Media was acquired by Meetic, a subsidiary of Match Group, in 2012. Ablo was discontinued on 30 September 2022.

== History ==
The app was launched in January 2019 simultaneously on Android, iOS and web. It was available in more than 180 markets, and was especially popular with people aged 18–26 years old.

In December 2019, it announced 6.5 million downloads globally and was selected as the Best App of 2019 by Google in the Google Play Store. Ablo was selected as one of the best Android apps of 2019 by CNET, alongside TikTok, Google Maps and Disney Plus. Ablo was discontinued on 30 September 2022.

== Features ==
Ablo's main feature was the ability to connect live with another person from anywhere in the world using automatically translated text and subtitled video calling.
