= Spring.me =

Defunct American social networking service

Formspring, Inc.
- Website type: Social Q&A website
- Available in: English
- Headquarters: San Francisco, California, US
- Area served: Worldwide
- Founder: Ade Olonoh
- Key people: Ade Olonoh
- Industry: Social networking service
- Website: spring.me
- Registration: Required to post responses and questions
- Launched: November 2009; 17 years ago
- Current status: Defunct May 15, 2013, URL redirects to Twoo

Spring.me was a social networking service. Until a rebranding in 2013, it was known as Formspring, a question-and-answer-based social network launched in 2009 by Ade Olonoh, the founder of online form builder Formstack.

As of August 1, 2015, the website had become a portal of Twoo, which has in itself become a web portal to Plenty of Fish. Humor Rainbow Inc. does not disclose whether the original contents still exist.

== History ==
Formspring was launched in Indianapolis in November 2009 by the founder of online form builder Formstack, Ade Olonoh. He noticed that most of their users were using the service to create "ask me anything" forms and decided to launch a separate site to make this easier. At launch, Formspring was referred to by its full URL, formspring.me, to distinguish it from Formstack, which was at that time also called Formspring.com. Formspring.me gained 1 million registered users in its first 45 days, so the original Formspring website was renamed to avoid confusion between the two sites.

Formspring was soon spun off into a separate company and moved to San Francisco, California. Due to its sudden popularity, a number of websites quickly implemented similar features, such as ASKfm, Tumblr, and MyYearbook's "Ask Me" services. On June 3, 2010, Formspring launched a major redesign, overhauling every aspect of the website.

Formspring received a $2.5 million series seed round of funding from a large group of angel investors, including SV Angel, Lowercase Capital, Kevin Rose, and Dave Morin. Formspring named Rogelio (Ro) Choy as COO in April 2011. On June 28, 2011, Formspring announced that its 25 millionth user had signed up.

In June 2011, Formspring launched features for celebrities to better communicate with their fans, including verified accounts. Celebrity Formspring users could be found on the site's "Formspring Favorites" section, which categorized verified users by music, comedy and various entertainment verticals. In November 2011, Formspring launched a media partnership program, partnering for the first time with media outlets including MTV, Hearst, Funny or Die and The Huffington Post.

As of early 2012, Formspring had reached over 4 billion responses. In February 2012, Formspring was named a top ten most innovative social media site by Fast Company.

== Features ==
Users of the site could follow others privately. While logged in as a registered user, people could also ask questions of their followers from the homepage. Spring.me also asked one question per day named "Formspring Question of the Day" which was flashed in users' inbox. In January 2011, Spring.me added a smile button which acted similar to the Facebook like button.

In September 2011, Formspring released an iPhone Application and several months later, in January 2012, further added to its mobile presence with the launch of its Android Application.

Also in January 2012, Formspring launched two additional features to the service. One new tool allowed users to sort responses to questions by the number of "Smiles" received to bring the most liked content to the top of response streams. The added functionality aimed to give users the power to curate the best content on the site. In addition to letting users see their top smiled responses, the new feature allowed Formspringers to view top responses from other users and also see the most smiled responses to a question that was asked to multiple people at once. The second new functionality launched gave Formspringers the option to choose whether they wanted to publicly or privately follow the accounts of other users. As part of this feature, Formspring users were then able to see how many others on the site were following their account.

== Controversies ==
Since its inception, Formspring garnered controversies, especially among teenagers, as it opened doors for harassment and cyberbullying due to the anonymity of the entries. On 12 March 2010, a news article, which later turned out to be a hoax, reported Formspring creators planning to release personal information about its users via Twitter and other social networking sites. Formspring has stated on its company blog that it will never publicly reveal anonymous information of its users. On 22 March 2010, Alexis Pilkington, a 17-year-old New York high school graduate, committed suicide, reportedly after several insulting comments targeting her had been posted on Formspring in the days leading up to her death. Soon after, a local grassroots boycott of the Formspring site began.

In February 2011, an incident allegedly prompted by bullying on Formspring led to the death of 15-year-old Natasha MacBryde from Bromsgrove, Worcestershire, United Kingdom. The Coroner's inquiry heard that she received anonymous personal abuse via the website on 13 February; this appears to have compounded bullying and teenage anxiety to a level, where MacBryde took her own life on 14 February after researching suicide methods. According to the Daily Telegraph, Det Sgt Shanie Erwin told the inquest that Natasha was known to have received a short anonymous message containing personal abuse via the Formspring networking site on February 13. The message, which was read to the jury by Det Sgt Erwin, derided MacBryde for "hiding" behind make-up. It ended: “Start acting nicer to people or you will lose everyone. Mark my words.”

In September 2011, another bullying incident, involving anonymous harassment on Formspring, led to the death of a 14-year-old. Jamey Rodemeyer, a student from Williamsville North High School in New York state, United States, committed suicide on 18 September after repeated incidents of bullying in real life and on Formspring. Rodemeyer's video, "It Gets Better", specifically called out Formspring as a factor in contributing to the anti-gay bullying impacting his life.

In March 2011, Formspring participated in a White House Conference on Bullying Prevention along with MTV, Facebook, Survey Monkey and others. At the conference, Formspring announced that it was working with The MIT Media Lab to develop new approaches in detecting cyberbullying, and to design interfaces that would help prevent or mitigate when it occurs. In January 2012, Formspring also announced that it was a sponsor of the Great American NO BULL Challenge, a nationwide video contest that encourages teenagers to stand up to bullying.

The concept of Formspring was copied by the creators of Ask.fm, who used the same format of allowing anonymous questioning by people who knew each other offline, which some experts believe is a toxic mix that will inevitably lead to trouble for some users. Both sites have been linked to several teenage suicides.

== Closure and rebranding ==
Formspring announced it would be closing over the months of March and April 2013. The reason for the closure was that it had "been challenging to sustain the resources needed to keep the lights on".

According to the announcement, asking questions on Formspring would be disabled on March 31, 2013, and the entire site would be shut down permanently on April 15, 2013, after which, all content on the site would be deleted.

On March 31, 2013, a short updated statement was released which stated "Great news! We have a last-minute deal in the works that will help keep Formspring up. More details to follow in the coming week."

On May 8, 2013, a statement on the main page was issued stating; "5/8/13 – Great news friends, Formspring has been saved and is now under new management. Get ready for some cool and exciting new features. Stay tuned for more updates and happy posting!!". In May 2013, Spring.me acquired the assets of Formspring. Spring.me was officially launched in beta in September 2013 and launched publicly in November 2013.

As of August 1, 2015, the website redirected to Twoo, a social discovery and rating platform.

In 2014, an imitation site, Retrospring, launched. Unlike the original, Retrospring was open-source platform, so anyone could contribute to its development and self-host the software. Retrospring shut down on March 1, 2025.

== See also ==
- ASKfm
