= Frank Morales =

American priest and activist (born 1949)

- Born: 1949 (age 76–77); New York City, New York
- Occupations: Priest, activist
- Spouse: Nancy Jo Sales (m. 2004; div. 2006)

Frank Morales is an Episcopal priest and activist in New York City.

Morales was born in 1949 and grew up in the Jacob Riis Houses on the Alphabet City, Manhattan. His father was Puerto Rican and his mother was Peruvian. He first became involved in politics after the assassinations of John F. Kennedy, Robert F. Kennedy and Martin Luther King Jr. as a member of the Assassination Information Committee.

Morales graduated from the General Theological Seminary in 1976, and became an assistant pastor in 1978. In the Bronx he worked with squatters. In one interview he recalled, “I used to walk out of services with a crowbar and we’d open up abandoned buildings…” He now volunteers at St Mark's Church in-the-Bowery.

In 2003, he founded the Campaign to Demilitarize the Police in NYC. He continues to campaign on housing issues.

He was married to journalist Nancy Jo Sales from 2004 to 2006.

== See also ==
- Liberation theology
- Take it to the Streets
