= Gregorio Marzán =

Puerto Rican folk artist

- Born: 1906; Vega Baja, Puerto Rico
- Died: 1997 (Age 91); New York, New York
- Education: No formal training
- Known for: Sculpture

Gregorio Marzán (1906–1997) was a Puerto Rican self-taught artist in New York City. After retiring from toy-making at the age of sixty-five, he created a large variety of sculptures from everyday, common objects. His objects often portray either animals or American patriotic figures, such as many diverse renditions of the Statue of Liberty.

== Early life ==
Marzán was born in Vega Baja, a coastal town in north central Puerto Rico, just west of San Juan. He grew up working in sugar cane fields, did not attend school past first grade, and later gained carpentry skills as a teenager through building wooden frames for suitcases. After saving enough money, he (and eventually his children) migrated to the United States, during "The Great Migration" of Puerto Ricans to New York before and after World War II.

He settled into an East Harlem Tenement at 107 East 110th street where he was later joined by his children and other family members. He eventually moved to a nearby brownstone on East 111th street where he lived alone, and ultimately moved into a studio apartment in the George Washington Carver Houses public housing projects in East Harlem, Manhattan, and found work through the Works Projects Administration at Novelty Toys, a New York toy manufacturer where he stuffed dolls and created toy animals up until he retired in 1971. In his free time, he also created small art novelties and boxes.

== Artistic works ==
After his retirement from the toy factory, Gregorio Marzán used his life of carpentry and doll-making to create larger, vibrant renderings and sculptures. He scrounged up everyday materials such as Elmer's glue bottle caps, jewelry, plastic eyes, bottle caps, glitter, reflective paper, paper, masking tape, light bulbs, and plaster from shops on Canal Street and Woolworth's in New York City. Coat hangers and cartons were recycled from the laundry, and fake hair was supplied by a wig shop in Harlem.

Marzán's inspirations for sculptures came from animals and figures he had seen in Puerto Rico and New York, such as colorful roosters and whimsical giraffes from the Central Park Zoo. He exhibits his Puerto Rican roots through the Latin American tradition of creating shrines and totems out of common objects, but often celebrated his new home in New York City through distinctly-American icons such as the Statue of Liberty, eagles, and the Empire State Building.
