= Dittfach =

Dittfach is a surname. Notable people with the surname include:

- Hugo Dittfach (1936–2021), Canadian jockey
- Jaiden Dittfach (born 1997), American YouTuber and animator known for Jaiden Animations
