= Carver Houses =

Public housing development in Manhattan, New York

- NYCHA property
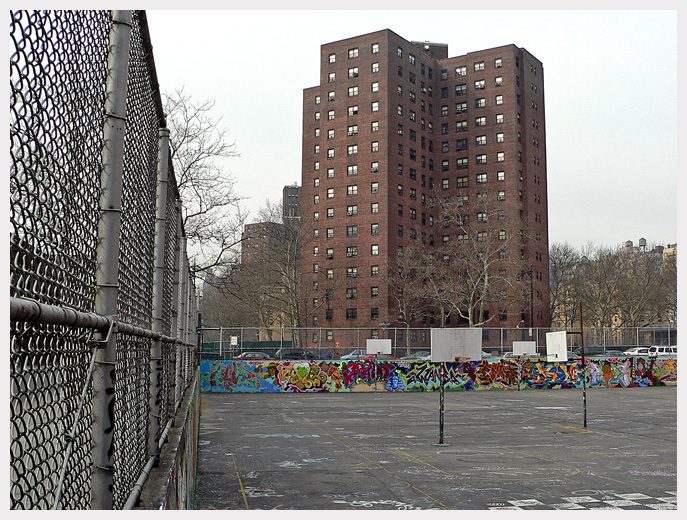
- Interactive map of Carver Houses
- Coordinates: 40.7906°N 73.9506°W
- Country: United States
- State: New York
- City: New York City
- Borough: Manhattan

Area
  - Total: 0.022 sq mi (0.057 km^{2})

Population
  - Total: 2,646
  - Density: 120,000/sq mi (46,000/km^{2})
- ZIP codes: 10029
- Area codes: 212, 332, 646, and 917
- Website: my.nycha.info/DevPortal/

Carver Houses, or George Washington Carver Houses, is a public housing development built and maintained by the New York City Housing Authority (NYCHA) in Spanish Harlem, a neighborhood of Manhattan.

Carver Houses has 13 buildings, on a campus with an area of 14.63 acres (5.92 ha). Nine of those (I-II, V-IX, XII-XIII) are fifteen stories tall, while the other four (III-IV, X-XI) are six stories tall. The development is bordered by East 99th Street to the south, East 106th Street to the north, Park Avenue to the east, and Madison Avenue to the west. In addition, East 102nd Street and East 104th Street run through the campus. The nine buildings of Carver Houses have a total of 1,246 apartments housing about 2,723 people.

== About ==
The Carver houses replaced brownstones and tenement buildings which were demolished through slum clearance, displacing residents. During construction, crews discovered they were building over Montague's Creek, which fed into Hell Gate. The first buildings of the development were completed in 1955, and the rest by January 31, 1958. Kahn & Jacobs designed the complex which is named after George Washington Carver (1864-1943), an African American chemist, botanist, and educator who, despite being born into slavery, developed many uses for soybeans, peanuts, and sweet potatoes. The project was funded by the state; rentals initially cost $12 a room. Once completed, the neighborhood saw a population decrease from over 2,000 residents to around 1,200.

Funded through a grant from the Vincent Astor Foundation, the open space at the housing complex was designed by architect Simon Breines and landscape architect M. Paul Friedberg and included a plaza, amphitheater and climbing wall; the climbable sculpture was inspired by Isamu Noguchi. A dedication ceremony for the 60,000-square-foot (5,600 m^{2}) amphitheater was held on June 6, 1964 and attended by Brooke Astor. The results of the project led her to offer $1 million in funds for the development of open space at the Riis Houses.

In December 1970, led by the Young Lords, tenants organized a rent strike until NYCHA provided more police officers to help preserve their community.

In 2007, GrowNYC installed a community garden on the property.

As of 2019, Shaun Commodore is serving as Resident Association President for Carver Houses, and is a member of the Manhattan South District Citywide Council of Presidents.

In 2020, Trust Republic Land, Mount Sinai, and NYCHA worked to bring Carver Houses the first outdoor Adult Fitness Zone on NYCHA grounds.

Carver Houses is served by the 23rd precinct of the New York City Police Department, and is governed by Manhattan Community Board 11.

In recent years, this housing development has been receiving a small though significant influx of Chinese residents with many coming from originally Manhattan's Chinatown, which has been undergoing gentrification as well as other Asian enclaves are also gentrifying leading to an increase of Chinese speaking families and other Asian families in the city to apply for government housing programs ranging from NYCHA and Mitchell Lama programs and taking the apartment opportunities if and wherever they are selected for in the city, which includes some being selected for an apartment opportunity at this development as well other public housing developments in the neighborhood including Mitchell Lama's Franklin Plaza Co-op. There has been concerns about the Asian residents being culturally and socially isolated in the area due to limited English and very limited in being able to find other residents who can speak their languages to relate to and still needing to travel back to Manhattan's Chinatown for their cultural needs including with socialization. In 2023, an NYU Journalist Aria Young conducted an interview video with the Chinese speaking elders living in this development reflecting on these experiences in which the interview video was posted on YouTube called "Out Of Place: Asian Seniors in East Harlem Public Housing".

== Notable people ==
- Gregorio Marzán (1906–1997), Puerto Rican artist

== See also ==
- New York City Housing Authority
