= Match.com =

American online dating service

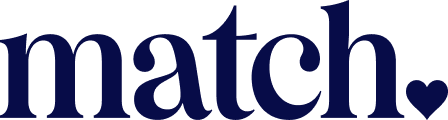
- Website type: Online dating service
- Available in: English
- Owner: Match Group
- Founders: Gary Kremen; Peng T. Ong; Simon Glinsky
- CEO: Hesam Hosseini
- Parent: Match Group
- Website: www.match.com
- Commercial: Yes
- Registration: Yes
- Launched: April 21, 1995; 31 years ago
- Current status: Active

Match.com is an American online dating service headquartered in Dallas, Texas. The company has offices in Dallas, West Hollywood, San Francisco, Tokyo, Rio de Janeiro, and Beijing. Match.com is owned by Match Group, which owns several online dating services.

== History ==
In 1993, Match.com was founded by Gary Kremen and Peng T. Ong and Simon Glinsky in San Francisco. At the beginning, Match.com was the name of the website, while the company that operated it was formally named Electric Classifieds Inc. Early on, Kremen was assisted by Ong, who helped in the design of the initial system, and Simon Glinsky, who co-wrote its business plan, developed product designs including matching criteria, services to LGBTQ communities, created business models and initial marketing strategies and made early hires. Fran Maier later joined the company as its director of marketing. According to a retrospective from The Atlantic, Maier helped to implement Match.com's business strategy, which included a subscription model and the inclusion of diverse communities, including technology professionals and the lesbian, gay, bisexual, transgender and queer communities. Match.com became operational as a free beta version website during early 1995 and was first profiled in Wired magazine that same year.

Founder Kremen left the company in March 1996 after disagreements with venture capitalists. In 1997, Match.com was purchased by CUC International. Following CUC's merger with HFS to form Cendant, the company was sold to IAC in 1999.

=== Growth and partnerships ===
In September 2001, Match.com partnered with AOL and MSN with the idea that Love@AOL and MSN Dating and Personals would allow a more diverse audience to gain access to Match.com.

In 2002 and early 2003, Match.com's then CEO, Tim Sullivan, expanded Match.com into local dating with a service called MatchLive, where daters would meet in a public location for social activities and a form of speed dating.

In September 2004, Jim Safka replaced Sullivan as CEO. Safka was replaced as CEO by Thomas Enraght-Moony in 2007.

On November 10, 2005, a class action was filed by Matthew Evans against Match.com in federal court in Los Angeles, alleging that Match.com employed fake members to send emails and go on dates with paying members. IAC repudiated the suit as baseless and was later dismissed by the United States District Court for the Central District of California on April 25, 2007. Similar suits were filed in June 2009 and December 2010, with the judges ruling that Match.com did not break user agreements.

In January 2006, Match.com hired Dr. Phil McGraw as a celebrity spokesman.

=== Formation of Match Group ===
In February 2009, IAC incorporated Match Group as a conglomerate of Match.com and other dating sites it owned. Also in February, it was announced that Match.com's European operations would be sold to Meetic for 5 million Euros and a reported twenty-seven percent interest in the company. At the same time that this sale was announced, the current CEO Thomas Enraght-Moony stepped down, while IAC's (Match.com's parent company) Executive VP and General Counsel, Greg Blatt, took his place.

In July 2009, Match.com acquired People Media, which powered AOL Personals and operated BlackPeopleMeet.com and OurTime.com from American Capital for $80 million. The following year, Match.com acquired SinglesNet, another dating site. In December 2010, Match.com’s CEO Greg Blatt was made CEO of parent company IAC.

In 2012, Match.com bought OkCupid, and Sam Yagan, OkCupid's co-founder and CEO, became CEO of Match Group. That same year, Match.com announced Stir, an events service that was to offer local events each month for Match.com members to attend.

In April 2014, Match.com launched an updated mobile app with a feature called "Stream" which used location to match people based on photographs, using similar algorithms as the mobile dating app Tinder. The platform's membership auto-billing method has been criticized by customers for the lack of transparency.

In 2017, Yagan was replaced by Mandy Ginsberg as the CEO of Match.com’s parent company, Match Group.

In 2020, Ginsberg was succeeded by Shar Dubey as the CEO of Match Group.

In 2022, Match Group released a new service called Stir, a dating app for single parents.

In April 2022, The Match Group announced that Shar Dubey was stepping down from her position as CEO while remaining on the board of directors. Bernard Kim, ex-president of online video game service Zynga, became CEO effective May 31, 2022.

== Use by sexual predators ==
A woman claiming she was raped by another person she met on Match.com sued the site in 2011. The woman and her lawyer wanted Match.com to start doing background checks on their users to prevent registered sex offenders from using the site. Match.com has responded that it would create many problems getting background information from all its users. Days after the lawsuit was filed, Match.com announced that the site would begin screening new members.

From 2011 to 2014, Jason Lawrance, a man described by British police as a “sexual predator” contacted thousands of women through the website. He raped five of them. In March 2016, Derby Crown Court heard that four of the victims complained about the man to Match.com; one of the women was told that administrators could not do anything because he had not sent abusive messages through the site.

== See also ==
- Comparison of online dating services
- Timeline of online dating services
