= Netlog =

Belgian social networking website

- Website type: Social networking service
- Owner: Massive Media
- Website: http://www.netlog.com/
- Commercial: Yes
- Registration: Required
- Launched: 1999; 27 years ago (as ASL.TO)

Netlog (formerly known as Facebox and Bingbox) was a Belgian social networking service targeted at the global youth demographic. On Netlog, members could create their own web page, meet new people, chat, play games, share videos and post blogs.

The site was founded and launched in 1999 under the name ASL.TO in Ghent, Belgium, by Lorenz Bogaert and Toon Coppens. In 2002 the name of the website was changed into Redbox, a website targeted to the Belgian youth. Starting from 2005, it was available in other countries in and outside Europe. About one year later, the website was renamed ‘Netlog’. By 2007, Netlog had attracted 28 million members and kept on growing the years after. At its height, the site claimed to have over 94 million registered users across 20+ languages.

In January 2011, Netlog announced that the site would become part of Massive Media, a global media group, focusing mainly on social media, and allowing product portfolio to expand into new markets. They also owned Twoo.com, a free social discovery platform launched in 2011, and Stepout, an application for meeting new people nearby (relaunched in late 2013). As of 2015, the homepage shows a sign it has been merged with Twoo. In July 2018 Netlog notified users that its security had been compromised in 2012 and logins and passwords of users were obtained by external agents. As of September 2018, Netlog's homepage informs that the website is no longer in service since 2015.

== Localization ==
Netlog had a localization technology ensuring that all content is geotargeted and personalized to each member's profile. This enabled a member to have localized searches and overviews on the community, displaying only those member profiles of his or her own age range and region.

== Breach of 2012 ==
In July 2018 Netlog sent out an email informing users registered before December 2012 that there was a security breach of their user database.

== See also ==
- Social software
