= Bye Felipe =

Instagram account and book by Alexandra Tweten

Bye Felipe is an Instagram account and book by Alexandra Tweten; the term became an internet meme for men "behaving badly" in online dating apps. The Atlantic called the Instagram account a "crowdsourced menagerie of mankind's worst specimens." The Instagram account accepts submissions of "insulting, ridiculous and sometimes outright threatening messages" women receive in online dating apps and posts them for commentary by followers.

== History ==
The Instagram account, started in October 2014, features screenshots of messages in dating apps forwarded by women who've received them from men. Tweten was a member of a Facebook group for Los Angeles women. One woman posted a screenshot of a message, "Asshole," that she'd received on OkCupid when she hadn't responded to an earlier message. Other women posted tales of similar experiences of men "turning hostile when rejected or ignored" including Tweten, who posted about one man who had messaged her the same OkCupid line three times over a month, and when Tweten finally responded "No," his response was "WHY THE FUCK NOT? If you weren't interested, you shouldn't have fucking replied at all! WTF!" Tweten concluded that "You learn that you can't not respond; they freak out. But if you do respond, they also yell at you. You can't win." The commonality of the experience among the women on the Facebook group became an inside joke, Bye Felipe, a gender-flip play on Bye, Felicia, a popular meme for dismissing someone in an online conversation.

Tweten started the Instagram to share and discuss such posts with friends and as "a way to make fun of men who tried to make us feel bad." Within a few days she'd posted a dozen submissions; a writer for The Atlantic, Olga Khazan, stumbled across the account and wrote an article, calling Treten "feminist Tinder-creep-busting web vigilante" and the Instagram account became popular. By December 2014 the account had 278,000 followers, by 2016 almost 400,000 and by 2018 half a million. In a story for Ms., Tweten wrote she created the Instagram to commiserate with other women, let men know how those types of messages felt to women, and "expose the problematic entitlement some men feel they need to exert over women in general."

The book Bye Felipe: Disses, Dick Pics, and Other Delights of Modern Dating organizes the various types of men the inappropriate messages come from, "from Pickup Artist Peter to Michael Mansplainer and Trevor the Troll," analyzes the messages to determine what they have in common, and provides suggestions for handling them. Tweten said she wanted to "create a handbook for how to handle any situation when you're online dating as a woman" and that the book turned into an anthology of the "best – or worst, I guess" submissions she'd received.

== Reception ==
Frances Shaw, writing in the academic journal Social Media + Society, called Bye Felipe an example of feminist discursive activism by "highlighting of oppressive discourses in online dating." Jess Zimmerman, writing for The Guardian, said that sites like Bye Felipe and similar efforts such as Nice Guys of OkCupid, Fedoras of OkCupid, and Straight White Boys Texting "aren't just parades of female spite: they're an important archival project showcasing the breadth of men's casual, online misogyny." The New York Post called the Instagram account "hilarious." Lane Moore, writing in Elle and Cosmpolitan, called it "the best new Instagram account for your gross online dating messages." The Young Turks in October 2014 broadcast a discussion critical of the internet shaming aspect of the Instagram account, saying that some men were jerks and women should just block them and move on.
