= Nancy Jo Sales =

American journalist

- Born: October 15, 1964 (age 62); West Palm Beach, Florida
- Education: Yale University (BA); Columbia University (MFA)
- Occupations: Journalist, author
- Spouse: Frank Morales (m. 2004; div. 2006)
- Writing career
- Genre: Journalism

Nancy Jo Sales (born October 15, 1964) is a New York Times bestselling author and journalist at Vanity Fair, New York magazine, and Harper's Bazaar, among others. She is known for her article in the March 2010 issue of Vanity Fair titled "The Suspects Wore Louboutins" which served as the basis for the 2013 film, The Bling Ring.

== Early life and education ==
Sales was born on October 15, 1964, in West Palm Beach, Florida. In the early 1970s, her family moved to Miami, and in 1980 to New Hampshire, where she attended the Phillips Exeter Academy and graduated in 1982 as a Presidential Scholar.

In 1986 she graduated summa cum laude and Phi Beta Kappa from Yale University with a B.A. in literature, where she also won the Willet's Prize for fiction writing. She earned an MFA from Columbia University in 1991.

== Career ==
Sales worked as a reporter for People magazine in 1994. She was hired as a contributing editor at New York magazine and in 1999 as a contributing editor at Harper's Bazaar. She became a writer for Vanity Fair in 2000.

At Vanity Fair, she wrote a profile of reality television star Kate Gosselin that won a 2010 Mirror Award for best profile in digital media. A 2011 Vanity Fair article called "The Quaid Conspiracy" won a Front Page Award for Best Magazine Feature. Her 2013 book The Bling Ring: How A Gang of Fame-Obsessed Teens Ripped Off Hollywood and Shocked the World recounts the true story behind the Sofia Coppola film The Bling Ring, which was based on a 2010 Vanity Fair piece by Sales, "The Suspects Wore Louboutins". In 2016 she published American Girls: Social Media and the Secret Lives of Teenagers. Sales is also a filmmaker and producer. In 2018 her documentary film Swiped: Hooking Up in the Digital Age, aired on HBO.

Her American Girls: Social Media and the Secret Lives of Teenagers, published in 2016, explores how social media complicates and exacerbates the difficulties that girls and young women have to navigate as they grow up in a world already full of double standards and unfair expectations.

Her 1999 New York article "The Baby Dinner" was optioned by Working Title Films for use as a film, and her 2007 Vanity Fair piece about the double suicide of artist-filmmakers Jeremy Blake and Theresa Duncan was also optioned for a film, with a script written by Bret Easton Ellis but did not come to fruition.

== Personal life ==
She was married from 2004 to 2006 to Episcopal priest Frank Morales. She lives in New York City with her daughter, Zazie May Sales, who was born in 2000.

Growing up, she was penpals with Woody Allen, and her recounting of it, "Woody and Me", was included in 2010's New York Stories: Landmark Writing From Four Decades of New York Magazine.

== Bibliography ==
- Sales, Nancy Jo (2021). Nothing Personal: My Secret Life in the Dating App Inferno. New York City: Hachette. 384 pages. ISBN 978-0316492744.
- Sales, Nancy Jo (2016). American Girls: Social Media and the Secret Lives of Teenagers. New York City: Knopf. 404 pages. ISBN 978-0385353922. LCCN 2016931806.
- Sales, Nancy Jo (2013). The Bling Ring: How a Gang of Fame-Obsessed Teens Ripped Off Hollywood and Shocked the World. New York City: It Books. 268 pages. ISBN 978-0062245533. LCCN 2013443987.
- Sales, Nancy Jo (2016). American Girls: Social Media and the Secret Lives of Teenagers. Knopf. ISBN 978-0-385-35392-2
