= Cupid Media =

Online dating company

- Company type: Pty Ltd
- Website type: Online Services
- Available in: English, French, German, Spanish, Arabic, Danish, Portuguese, Norwegian, Swedish, other
- Headquarters: Gold Coast, Australia
- Area served: Worldwide
- Founder: Andrew Bolton
- Key people: Andrew Bolton, co-founder Emily Bolton, co-founder
- Industry: Online dating
- Products: AfroIntroductions.com, BlackCupid.com, InterracialCupid.com, Muslima.com, FilipinoCupid.com, ThaiCupid.com, AsianDating.com, others
- Employees: 50
- Website: cupidmedia.com
- Users: 60 million+ (December 2020)
- Launched: April 2000
- Current status: active

Cupid Media, owned by Dating Group, is an online dating company that operates 33 active niche dating websites based on religion, ethnicity, lifestyle and special interests. The network of sites are available in multiple languages and since its founding in 2000, over 60 million singles have registered across the company's sites. Cupid Media is based on the Gold Coast in Queensland, Australia.

== History ==
Originally starting with one dating site, AsianEuro.com, now AsianDating.com the company has now grown to 33 active dating sites targeting multiple countries, languages and ethnicities around the world. Popular Cupid Media brands include Muslima.com, ThaiCupid and FilipinoCupid.

The websites are built on Adobe ColdFusion and are available on iOS and Android devices via native HTML5 mobile sites.

On 28 July 2021, Dating Group announced its acquisition of Cupid Media.

== Security incident and data breach (2013) ==
In November 2013, Cupid Media disclosed that it had experienced a significant security breach affecting several of its dating platforms. According to reporting by The Guardian and NBC News, attackers gained access to a database containing tens of millions of user records, including email addresses, usernames, and passwords stored in plain text. The breach was identified after security researchers analysing a large cache of compromised data found entries associated with Cupid Media services and notified the company.

On 13 January 2013, Cupid Media confirmed that its password database had been breached and a section of its user base had been affected. Affected members were contacted by the company requesting them to change their password as well as additional security measures being put in place.

The breach drew international attention due to the scale of exposed credentials and the sensitivity of data associated with online dating platforms, prompting broader discussion about password‑storage practices and user‑data protection within the industry. Ultimately this led to an investigation by the OAIC.

== Privacy breach and OAIC findings (2013–2014) ==
In June 2014, the Office of the Australian Information Commissioner (OAIC) released findings regarding a data breach affecting Cupid Media’s network of dating websites. The incident, which occurred in January 2013, involved the exposure of approximately 254,000 user records after a hacker accessed a database containing personal information including names, email addresses, dates of birth, and, in some cases, passwords stored in plain text. According to OAIC, Cupid Media had failed to take reasonable steps to secure personal information as required under the Privacy Act 1988, particularly in relation to password storage and legacy data retention practices.

The OAIC investigation concluded that Cupid Media had breached the Australian Privacy Principles by not adequately protecting user data and by retaining information that was no longer necessary for its business functions. The Commissioner required the company to improve its information‑security controls, implement stronger password‑management procedures, and enhance its data‑retention and deletion policies. Cupid Media stated that it had taken corrective action following the breach, including upgrading security systems and notifying affected users.

== Business and products ==
Cupid Media operates a network of 33 dating sites that target lifestyles, ethnicities, countries and special interests including:

- AfroIntroductions
- AsianDating
- AussieCupid – no longer active
- BBWCupid
- BlackCupid
- BrazilCupid
- CambodianCupid – launched November 2020
- CaribbeanCupid
- ChinaLoveCupid
- ChristianCupid
- ColombianCupid
- DominicanCupid
- FilipinoCupid – an international dating site aimed at bringing singles from the Philippines together with singles from around the world. Ranked 1,734 most popular site in the Philippines with 5.5 million members.
- GayCupid
- HongKongCupid
- IndianCupid
- IndonesianCupid
- InternationalCupid
- InterracialCupid
- IranianSinglesConnection – no longer active
- JapanCupid
- KenyanCupid
- KoreanCupid
- LatinAmericanCupid – bringing together Latin Singles from Central and South America.
- MalaysianCupid
- MexicanCupid
- MilitaryCupid – a special interests dating site that brings together Military singles with local singles.
- Muslima
- PinkCupid
- RussianCupid
- SingaporeLoveLinks
- SingleParentLove – no longer active
- SouthAfricanCupid
- ThaiCupid.com – a Thai online dating site that serves both the domestic Thai market and the international market. Ranked 206th most popular site in Thailand according to Alexa.com.
- UkraineDate
- VietnamCupid

== See also ==
- Match.com
- eHarmony
- AnastasiaDate
