= Job cuffing =

Reluctance of employees to leave their current job

In human resources, job cuffing refers to the reluctance of employees to leave an employer, typically due to economic uncertainty. Job cuffing typically occurs in the winter in the hopes that employment prospects will improve in the spring. Remote employees are less resistant to return to the office during job cuffing.

Job cuffing can negatively impact productivity as disengaged employees continue to work while waiting to resume the job search. Employers can counter job cuffing by improving their employee value proposition.

The term stems from cuffing season and being handcuffed to one's job.
