= Riis Houses =

Public housing development in Manhattan, New York

Jacob Riis Houses
- NYCHA property
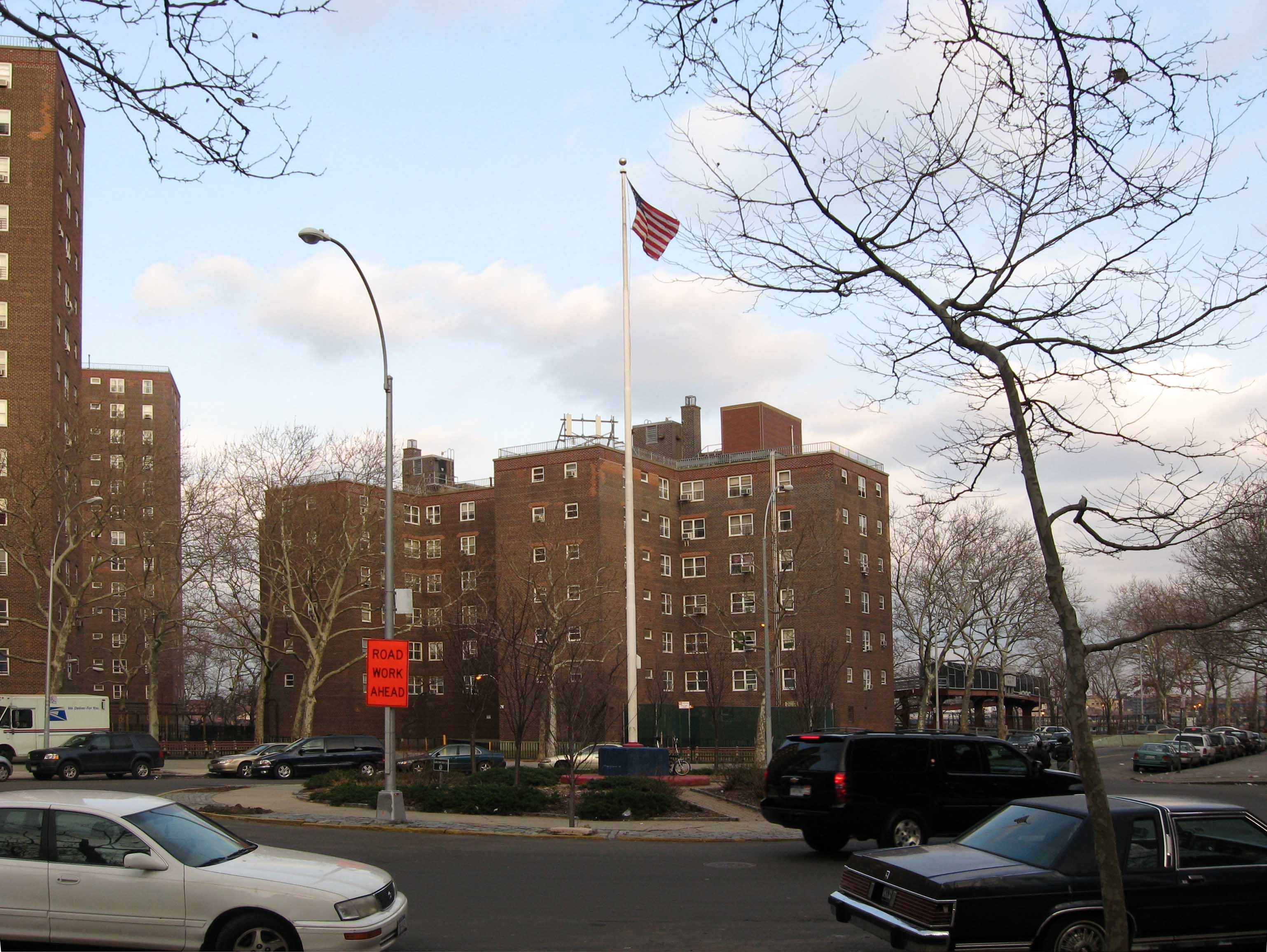
- Riis Houses in 2008
- Location in New York City
- Coordinates: 40.723917°N 73.974659°W
- Country: United States
- State: New York
- City: New York City
- Borough: Manhattan

Area
  - Total: 0.018 sq mi (0.047 km^{2})

Population
  - Total: 2,738
  - Density: 150,000/sq mi (59,000/km^{2})
- ZIP codes: 10009
- Area codes: 212, 332, 646, and 917
- Website: my.nycha.info/DevPortal/

The Jacob Riis Houses are a public housing project managed by the New York City Housing Authority (NYCHA) in the Alphabet City neighborhood of Manhattan. The project is located between Avenue D and FDR Drive, spanning two superblocks from 6th Street to 13th Street. The project consists of thirteen buildings, between six and 14 stories each, containing 1,191 apartment units.

== Development ==
The area to become the Riis Houses was destroyed through urban renewal beginning in August 1943 but construction was delayed because of World War II. The Riis Houses were completed on January 17, 1949 and named for photographer Jacob Riis, who exposed the living conditions of tenement dwellers on the Lower East Side. The housing project was designed by James Mackenzie, Sidney Strauss, and Walker & Gillette.

The playground was designed to have four "outdoor rooms" for a variety of activities and was designed by Pomerance & Breines with M. Paul Friedberg & Associates as landscape architects. It was financed through a grant from the Victor Astor Foundation and opened in 1966 with Ladybird Johnson attending its opening. Later that year, it received a First Honor Award for design excellence by the Department of Housing and Urban Development. The design of the open space evolved from prior designs made by the same two firms at the Carver Houses and Straus Houses. Four new playgrounds throughout the city were modeled from it in 1967. In 2018, its playground was inspected by NYCHA and found to be hazardous.

During Hurricane Sandy in 2012, the development was hit by a storm surge that left it without electricity and other services. In 2018, NYCHA received a grant for $71 million to fund necessary infrastructure repairs from Sandy anticipated to begin in 2022. Upgrades include: emergency generators, electrical distribution equipment, waterproofing of structures and finishes, upgrades to sewer/storm management systems, new roadways, pedestrian lighting, rehabilitation of building entrances and lobbies.

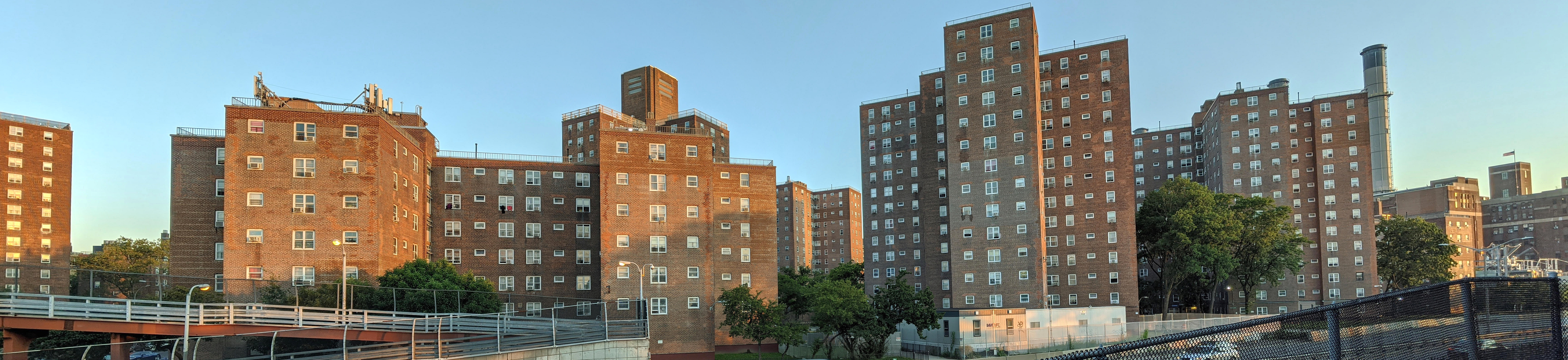
Riis Houses (2020)

== Notable residents ==
- Adolfo Carrión Jr. (1961–), politician
- Frank Morales (1949–), priest and activist
- Sabu (1983–), computer hacktivist

== See also ==
- List of New York City Housing Authority properties
