= Azar (mobile app) =

Video communication platform

Azar is a real-time video communication platform available on both iOS and Android.

== History ==
Founded in 2014 under the IT company Hyperconnect based in South Korea, Azar enables users to be connected through an AI matching system.

Azar was the first instance of WebRTC commercialization in a mobile environment. Azar is provided in 230 countries and 19 languages around the world, and international users account for 99% of its user base.

As of March 12, 2024, by its 10th year anniversary, Azar has facilitated over 147 billion global matches.

In November 2025, Azar will delete their live streaming feature.
