= Noonlight =

- Developer: Zach Winkler
- Initial release: 2013
- Operating system: Android, iOS
- Website: www.noonlight.com

Noonlight, formerly SafeTrek, is a software company founded in 2013 by CEO Zach Winkler and co-founders Aaron Kunnemann, Brittany LeComte, and Nick Droege. It provides professional monitoring and emergency response through its personal safety app and APIs. The app is available for both Android and iOS devices.

== Background ==
The app was founded on the University of Missouri campus in 2013 by Zach Winkler, Aaron Kunnemann, Brittany LeComte, and Nick Droege as part of a technology competition. It was developed as a mobile version of the blue lights on the campus.

Noonlight has since grown into a software company whose APIs are used to integrate personal safety services, professional sensor monitoring, video verification, and emergency response to other companies' products and IoT devices including Wyze, Sabre, and Roku.

In October 2022, Alarm.com acquired a majority stake in Noonlight. The terms of the transaction were not disclosed.

The Noonlight app has been reported in local media to have helped stop two kidnappings.

== Data collection and analysis ==
Gizmodo reported that Noonlight shares data with ad tech companies, such as Meta and Google. Noonlight denied that it sells user data.
