= Kyaw Soe Oo (journalist) =

Burmese journalist and media personality

- ကျော်စိုးဦး
- Born: 1988 (age 37–38); Myanmar (Burma)
- Citizenship: Burmese
- Occupations: Journalist, Media personality
- Years active: 2013–present
- Organization: People Media
- Awards: The Social Outstanding Medal (Second Class)
- Website: People Media's website

Kyaw Soe Oo (Burmese: ကျော်စိုးဦး; pronounced [tɕɔ̀ sʰó ʔú]; born 1988) is a Burmese journalist and media personality best known for his work with People Media.

== Career ==
Kyaw Soe Oo arrived in Yangon in 2012 and began working as a journalist for a weekly news magazine in 2013. He later joined an online TV news called Ludu Media, where he was eventually promoted to editor. During this time, he conducted interviews with opposition groups and critics of the National League for Democracy government. These interviews drew public attention. Some of them led to a legal case filed by the driver of retired General Shwe Mann against Hla Swe, former Information Minister Ye Htut, and Bo Bo Kyaw Nyein under the Citizens' Personal Freedom and Protection Act. The case was dismissed by the Law Office, which ruled that the case was unconstitutional. He remained an editor until the online media was renamed People Media. In 2021, he became the online outlet's editor-in-chief.

During the 2021 military coup, Kyaw Soe Oo criticized the military's opponents through his solo broadcasts and his media outlet, People Media. He also frequently posed questions at military press conferences regarding ethnic armed groups. Kachin Independence Army (KIA) General Sumlut Gun Maw posted on social media that he had documented Kyaw Soe Oo's activities, drawing criticism from opposition figures.

Kyaw Soe Oo backs the military but has taken issue with some things the police have done. He got attention for calling out police officers who didn't show up to the funeral of Police Chief Nay Lin Hein, killed in the Battle of Somprabung in Kachin State on 8 March 2024. Police arrested him over it. He was charged under Section 505 (a) of the Penal Code at Zambuthiri Police Station in Nay Pyi Taw, but they let him go a few days later without pressing charges. They picked him up again on 9 January 2025 over a news broadcast he'd done. Some nationalist activists spoke out against the arrest. While he was held, People Media's news broadcasts got pulled. He was out after a few days and went back to presenting.

Kyaw Soe Oo is also known for supporting military violence against civilians and has repeatedly urged the junta to carry out aerial bombardments. He has frequently applauded and encouraged the military during airstrikes that resulted in numerous civilian casualties. In June 2024, during the Battle of Lashio, he reportedly suggested that the military should deploy groups of three helicopters for attacks rather than relying on a single aircraft, arguing that such a tactic would maximize casualties. In a 4 July 2024 broadcast about the Battle of Sangku, he called on the military to bomb the town, stating that the land remained and buildings could be rebuilt.

In January 2026, Kyaw Soe Oo was reported to have engaged in a controversial act at a cemetery for fallen resistance fighters while visiting Singu Township alongside military troops after the town had been retaken from resistance forces. Photographs circulated online showing him placing his foot on a tombstone belonging to a member of the People’s Defense Force (PDF) while tying his shoelaces. The incident sparked public backlash and criticism from supporters of the resistance movement, who described the gesture as disrespectful toward those who had died in the conflict. Following the controversy, some supporters of the revolutionary movement circulated posts offering large cash rewards for information leading to his arrest, and in certain instances called for violence against him.

== Awards and recognition ==
On March 2, 2026, he was conferred the Medal for Excellent Performance in Social Field (Second Class), one of the highest national medals awarded by the Government of Myanmar for exceptional contributions to social welfare.

== See also ==
- People Media
- 2021 Myanmar coup d'état
