= Time Out Group =

British media and entertainment company

- Type: Public
- Traded as: LSE: TMO
- Industry: Media
- Genre: Lifestyle
- Founded: 1968
- Founder: Tony Elliott
- Headquarters: London, England
- Key people: Chris Öhlund (CEO)
- Products: Websites, mobile apps guidebooks, social media, live events, food and cultural market
- Brands: Time Out; Time Out Market
- Number of employees: 450 (2022)
- Website: timeout.com

Time Out Group is a British media and hospitality company. Its digital and physical presence comprises websites, mobile editions, social media, live events and markets. Time Out covers events, entertainment and culture in cities around the world.

Time Out was established in 1968, by founder Tony Elliott and has developed into a global platform across 333 cities and in 59 countries. Time Out Market was launched in 2014 in Lisbon.

== History ==
The original Time Out magazine was first published in 1968 by Tony Elliott with Bob Harris as co-editor, and has since developed into a global platform across 333 cities and 59 countries. The magazine was a one-sheet pamphlet with listings for London. It started as a counter-culture publication that had an alternative viewpoint on issues such as gay rights, racial equality, and police harassment. Early issues had a print run of around 5,000 and evolved to a weekly circulation of 110,000. One of the editors in the 1970s was Roger Hutchinson.

The brand was expanded to North America with Time Out New York magazine also known as TONY in 1995 followed by Time Out New York Kids in 1996. The success of taking the Time Out brand abroad led to the expansion of the magazine worldwide. The brand grew to include travel magazines, city guides, and books.

Time Out was able to withstand print competition; however, its late integration of a digital platform during the online revolution proved to be a challenge. When Time Out New York launched it did not have a website and was competing against well-established online publications such as Citysearch and The Village Voice. The company; however, continued to expand with licensing of the brand and in 2009 launched its iPhone app in New York and then London, which was sponsored by Smirnoff, enabling the app to be free of charge.

Financial loss and the necessity to expand the Time Out brand led Tony Elliott to sell half of Time Out London and 66 percent of TONY to private equity group Oakley Capital in May 2011. Under new ownership, the company expanded the brand digitally through partnerships with software companies to develop a common online platform for the brand and to create multi-city mobile applications. The company continued to grow digitally and launched an iPad app for New York and London in July 2012. The iPad app was initially sponsored by MasterCard.

In July 2015, Time Out Group announced a £7 million investment in Flypay, a pay-at-table mobile app that will integrate its technology into Time Out's media platform.

In June 2016, Time Out Group underwent an initial public offering and trades under the symbol TMO on London's AIM stock exchange.

In March 2020, during the COVID-19 pandemic, the Time Out website altered its logo to read Time ~~Out~~ In, and the site began recommending activities that could be enjoyed at home.

== Time Out publications ==
Time Out content is available in cities around the world including Paris, Lisbon, Porto, L.A., Miami, Chicago, Sydney, Melbourne, Hong Kong, Madrid, Barcelona, Singapore, Beijing, Shanghai, Tel Aviv, Mexico City, Bangkok, Tokyo, Dubai and Istanbul among others. Time Out London magazine is a free weekly publication based in London. Time Out provides event listings and editorial on film, theatre and the arts in London to inform readers of the availability of entertainment in the city. After 54 years of publication, the print version of Time Out London was distributed on 23 June 2022 for the last time. The magazine continues to be published online.

Time Out New York (referred to as TONY) was the brand's first magazine launch in North America and debuted in 1995. Time Out New York is now available for free every other Wednesday in vending boxes and newsstands across New York City and there are copies inside cultural establishments, cafes and other locations. The web audience is estimated to 4.5 million unique visitors a month.

== Time Out guide books ==
Time Out Media publishes guides written by locals aimed at providing tourists with tips in urban "nooks" around the world. Mobile apps have been integrated with city guides to allow mobile users to use GPS to pinpoint their location on Time Out maps and search for dining and event recommendations along with a list of editors picks and other options.

== Time Out Market ==
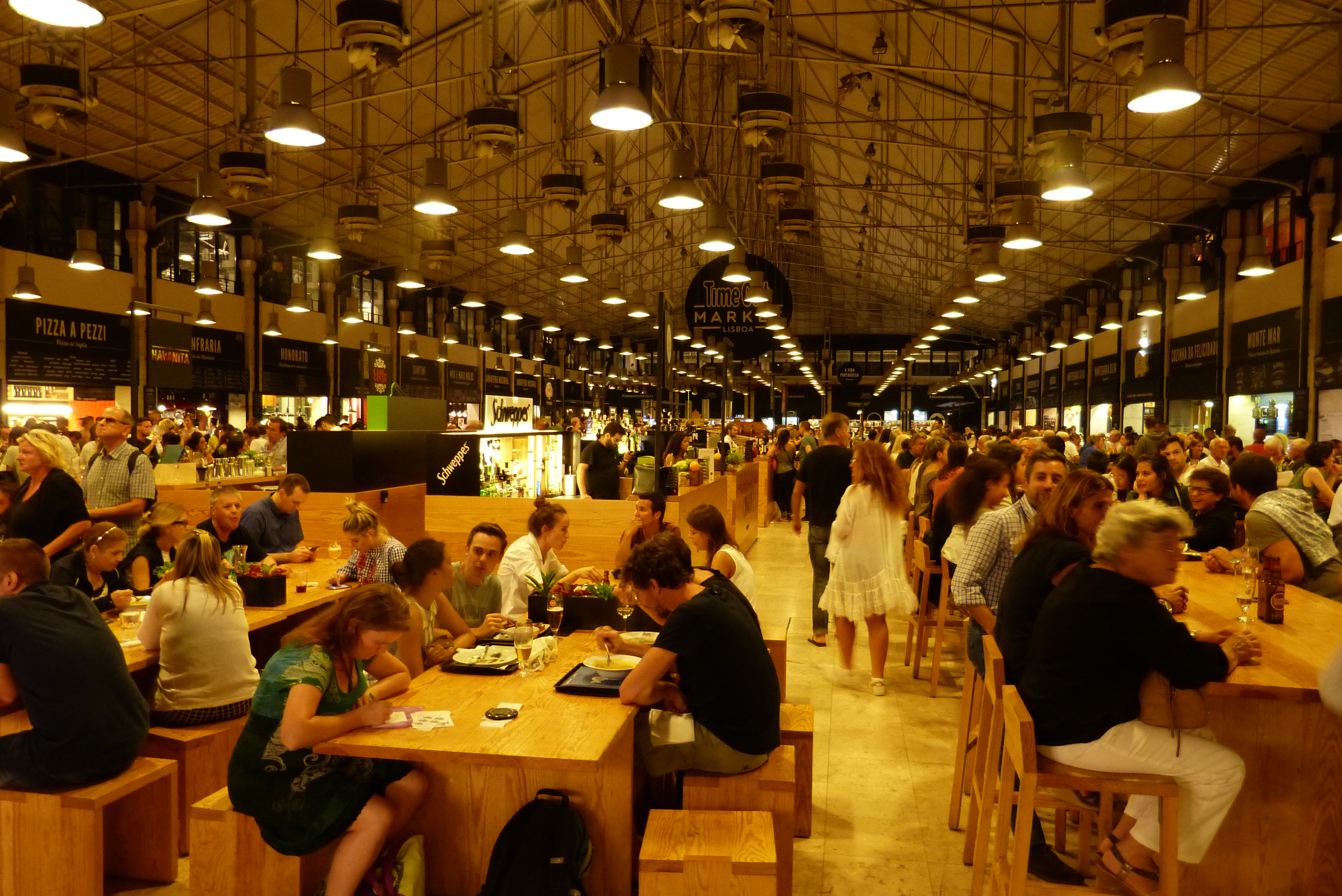
Time Out Market Lisbon

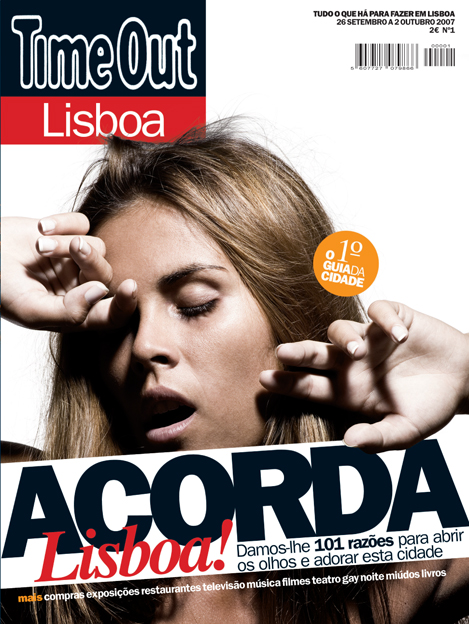
Launch cover for Time Out Lisbon Magazine

In April 2014 Time Out Lisbon launched the Time Out Mercado da Ribeira. The market hosts 35 small restaurant and artisan kiosks from chefs offering local specialities.

New Time Out Markets opened in 2019 in South Beach, Miami; Dumbo, New York; Fenway, Boston; Fulton Market District, Chicago; and Montreal. In 2021 in Dubai. In 2024, a new location opened in Porto and in Barcelona. In 2025 a location opened in Budapest And in 2026 a location opened at Oakridge Park in Vancouver. New locations are set to open in the future.

== Acquisitions ==
In August 2011, Time Out acquired the personalisation business LikeCube. Kelkoo, a daily-offers business, was acquired by Time Out in December 2011.

The Time Out brand license was acquired for the Chicago publication March 2013. The acquisition was part of a strategy to build an international media organisation in 50 cities. Changes included moving from print publication to exclusively digital format as only a limited few cities still have a printed Time Out magazine edition including London and New York.

Time Out acquired the event discovery platform Huge City in May 2014. In April 2016, Time Out acquired the geo-mapping start-up Hallstreet. In October 2016, Time Out acquired the event discovery and booking service YPlan.
