= The League (app) =

American social and dating mobile application

- Developer: Match Group
- Release: January 17, 2015; 11 years ago
- Operating system: iOS, Android
- Website: www.theleague.com

The League is an American social and dating mobile application launched in 2015 and available in several cities all over the world on iOS and Android.

== History ==
The League App was founded in 2014 by Amanda Bradford, who also serves as its CEO. She conceived of the app after growing frustrated with her own online dating experience. In July 2022, The League was acquired by Match Group for an undisclosed sum.

== Operation ==
Users connect their LinkedIn and Facebook profiles and then select their preferences for matches, with criteria including gender, age, height, distance, education, religion and ethnicity. Each user is assigned a representative who can answer app-related questions. As with Tinder, users swipe right to indicate interest in a potential match, or swipe left to pass. The League shows users only five potential matches per day. In April 2016, the app released a second version, with members now able to organize events and create groups. In June 2016, the app added a feature for women interested in freezing their eggs.

=== Selection process ===
Each member receives one ticket to bring in a friend, allowing that friend to bypass the application process. Without a ticket, a potential user can sign up for the waiting list. The League scans an applicant's Facebook and LinkedIn profiles to analyze alma maters, degrees, professions, industries, social influence, neighborhood and age. Diversity of applicants is also considered. Currently there are over 420,000 profiles waiting to be selected for inclusion. Paying to become a member allows the user to jump the line.

In May 2016, the app began allowing people older than 40 to sign up. As of August 2016, the median age of the users was 28. They are 95% straight, and 99% have a college degree. As of 2017, The League claimed it was accepting approximately 10-20% of users who sign up. Third-party data estimates The League has a few hundred thousand users; users can pay nearly $1,000 per week for its top features.

== Controversy ==
The League's exclusivity has been controversial, critiqued as being elitist.

Allegations of racism were due to the requirement for the user to declare their ethnicity, and the ability to filter non-white users. However, Bradford said people wanted to know about a person's race, and the ethnicity data is meant to help the site be more inclusive by being diverse.

According to founders of dating apps, including The League, this is because modern dating app algorithms downrank people when left-swiped (passed on), and uprank when right-swiped (approved).

"We did a ton of testing on this screen and these preferences were the most highly requested," she said ... while users can select a preference for the race of partners they'd like to meet, it's not a hard filter. The League shows each user five potential matches each day, and if a user has set his preferences too narrowly, he may be shown matches that don't conform to them, racially or otherwise. ... Bradford insists that the League's policies are meant to make the service more egalitarian, not less -- at least when it comes to race. "The ethnicity data helps us maintain a diverse and balanced community that reflects that of the city (in our case, the San Francisco Bay Area)," she says.

== See also ==
- Online dating service
- Tinder (app)
- Raya (app)
