= Shar Dubey =

Indian-American businesswoman

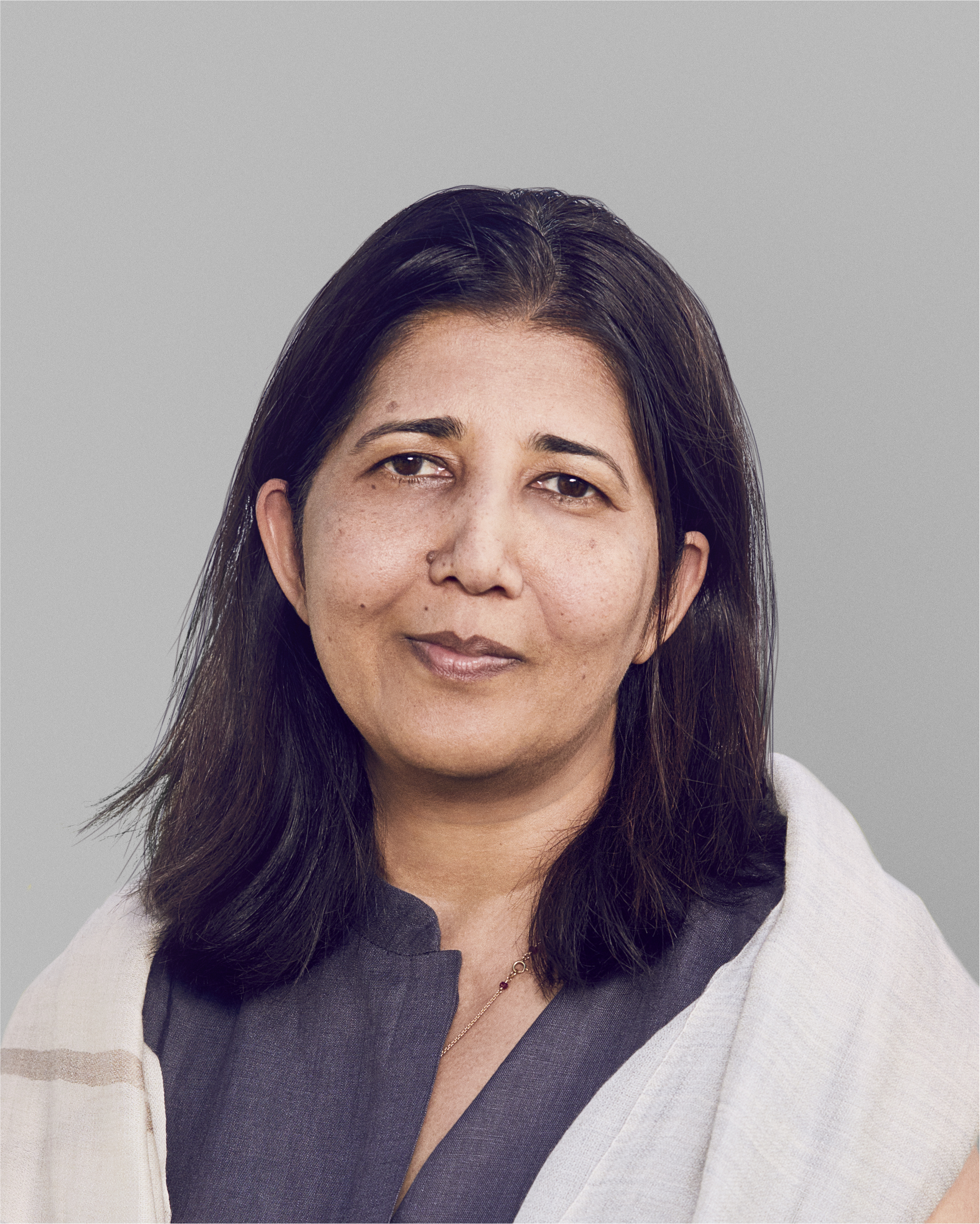
- Born: Sharmistha Dubey; 1970 (age 55–56); Jamshedpur, India
- Education: IIT Kharagpur; Ohio State University
- Predecessor: Mandy Ginsberg
- Board member of: Match Group, Prosus, Naspers, Fortive, and The RealReal
- Children: 1

Sharmistha Dubey (born 1970) is an Indian-born American business executive who serves as the chairperson of board of directors of Fortive. She also serves as a board director of Match Group, Naspers, Prosus, and The RealReal.

Previously, Dubey served as the chief executive officer (CEO) of Match Group from March 2020 to May 2022.

== Early life and education ==
Dubey was born in 1970 and grew up in Jamshedpur. She did her schooling from Loyola School. She earned a bachelor's degree in engineering from Indian Institute of Technology Kharagpur in 1993. She was the only woman metallurgical engineer that year and Sundar Pichai was a classmate, and said she almost quit in her first week. After graduation, Dubey returned to her hometown and worked for a steel company for a year, before saving up enough money to attend Ohio State University. Dubey later obtained an MS from Ohio State University.

== Career ==
Dubey began her career in 1998, as an engineer for Texas Instruments, before joining supply chain management software company i2 technologies, where she worked with Mandy Ginsberg and served as director of product until 2006.

In 2006, Dubey joined Match.com after Ginsberg offered her a role to lead Chemistry app with her. She continued to serve in multiple roles, including EVP of The Princeton Review and Tutor.com until 2016 when she was appointed as the president of Match Group Americas, while Ginsberg became the CEO. In 2017, Dubey briefly served as the chief operating officer (COO) of Tinder and led the launch of Tinder Gold.

In January 2018, Dubey was appointed President of Match Group and joined its board of directors in 2019.

In March 2020, Dubey became CEO of Match Group, succeeding Mandy Ginsberg who stepped down for personal reasons. Dubey began her tenure as CEO for Match Group just as the COVID-19 pandemic was hitting the US and three months before the company spun off from IAC. In an email dated May 2020, Dubey and Match Group reported that engagement was up for all brands, despite the pandemic, due in part to video dating offerings.

As of February 2020, when Dubey became CEO, 30 percent of adults in the US used online dating, up from 11% in 2013, according to Pew Research Center report. In August 2020, Dubey joined Fortive Corporation as its board of director.

In May 2022, Dubey stepped down as CEO of Match Group and was succeeded by Bernard Kim (previously from Zynga). Dubey remained a director of Match Group. In October 2022, she joined Advent International along with Mandy Ginsberg as operating partners.

In November 2026, Dubey was appointed to the board of directors for The RealReal, an online marketplace for luxury resale goods.

== Activism ==
On September 1, 2021, the Texas Heartbeat Act went into effect. Previously, the Supreme Court of the United States denied a motion to block enforcement in a 5–4 vote. Dubey announced that she would be creating a fund to assist Texas-based employees and their dependents who were impacted by the legislation stating that "I personally, as a woman in Texas, could not keep silent" and "I am shocked that I now live in a state where women's reproductive laws are more regressive than most of the world, including India." She indicated that the fund would cover expenses for those who needed to seek care outside of Texas. She made clear that this was a personal fund, and not on behalf of Match Group.

== Awards and recognition ==
In 2021, Dubey was included in the Fortune list of the 50 Most Powerful Women in Business. That same year, Dubey was named Tech Leader of the Year by Vogue India.

IIn 2024, Dubey received the Distinguished Alumni Award for Career Achievement from Ohio State University's College of Engineering.

== Personal life ==
Dubey is married to Partha and has one daughter.
