= YPlan =

- Type: Private
- Industry: Event planning
- Founded: November 2012
- Founders: Viktoras Jucikas and Rytis Vitkauskas
- Headquarters: London, United Kingdom
- Parent: Time Out Group
- Website: https://yplanapp.com

YPlan was a digital event discovery and booking service in London, United Kingdom founded in 2012. In 2016, YPlan was acquired by Time Out Group for 1.6 million GBP, after having raised 38 million USD in funding. It was shut down in 2017.

== Description ==
Viktoras Jucikas and Rytis Vitkauskas co-founded YPlan in 2012. They met at Jacobs University Bremen, Germany.

YPlan provided London and later other cities with a curated list of events, manually and with personalisation algorithms. Users login to find a selection of events in the next few days that they can book through the platform or its partner venues. Jucikas stated, from research carried out by the company and others, that "the absence of too much choice makes the consumer buy more rather than less. If you have 100 events you would be less likely to go to one because you would be overwhelmed by choice." According to the London Standard, there were around £600 million-worth of unsold theatre seats each year, which could be booked last minute.

In April 2013, Business Insider listed YPlan on their list of London startups to watch. Around the same time, YPlan appeared in 1st place on a similar list published by Mashable.

A year after launch, it was stated that the company had reached over 500,000 users. By the end of 2014, the app had more than 1 million downloads.

== Funding ==
After receiving early investments, the company secured 12 million USD in a series A round The funding was part of a plan to expand the service to New York City.

In 2014, the app received funding of $24 million (£16 million), according to TechCrunch. This brought the total funding of YPlan to just under $38 million. It was stated that the financing deal will allow the company to expand into other cities.

On the 21 October 2016, YPlan was acquired by Time Out Group for 1.6 million GBP. AS of 2015, the company had accumulated losses of $20.8M, and accounts showed how Rytis Vitkauskas talks of building a billion dollar company were far off the mark.

== Recognition ==
In its early years YPlan received coverage recognizing it as a fast growing startup,,, and profiling its founders,,

Notable recognitions include :

- The Sunday Times Tech Track 100: Ones to Watch (2014)
- WIRED: Europe's 100 Hottest Start-ups 2014 (2014)
- Forbes: Hottest Global Start-up of 2013 (2013)
