= Plenty of Fish =

Canadian online dating service

- Type: Subsidiary
- Industry: Internet
- Founded: 2003
- Headquarters: Vancouver, British Columbia, Canada
- Area served: Australia; Brazil; Canada; Ireland; New Zealand; Spain; United Kingdom; United States
- Key people: Markus Frind (Founder)
- Revenue: US$100 million (2014 estimated)
- Owner: Match Group
- Number of employees: 100
- Website: www.pof.com

Plenty of Fish (POF) is a Canadian online dating service, popular primarily in Canada, the United Kingdom, Ireland, Australia, New Zealand, Spain, Brazil, and the United States. It is available in nine languages. The company, which is based in Vancouver, British Columbia generates revenue through advertising and premium memberships. While it is free to use, Plenty of Fish offers premium services as part of their upgraded membership, such as allowing users to see who has "liked" a member through the service's MeetMe feature, and whether a message has been read and/or deleted.

== History ==
Markus Frind, CEO of Plenty of Fish Media Inc., graduated in 1999 from British Columbia Institute of Technology with a diploma in Computer Systems Technology, and founded the business in 2003.

In 2004, Plenty of Fish became a full-time money making business for Frind. He ran the site independently until 2008, when he began hiring other employees at his new Vancouver headquarters. In 2009, Plenty of Fish also launched a contest with Lady Gaga allowing single members to go together and meet the singer during The Fame Ball Tour.

The website for Plenty of Fish appeared in several music videos in 2010: in Lady Gaga's "Telephone", Natasha Bedingfield's "Touch", Kesha's "We R Who We R", Flo Rida and Akon's "Available", Jason Derulo's "Ridin' Solo", and 3OH!3's "Double Vision". In 2011, it appeared in Britney Spears's music video for "Hold It Against Me". Many of these appearances are undisclosed paid product placements which have been met with highly negative reviews.

In 2010, Plenty of Fish launched mobile apps for iPhone and Android. A few years later, it was made available for both the iPad and Windows phone. In a June 2014 interview, Frind attributed 85% of all Plenty of Fish traffic to mobile with the number growing weekly.

On January 21, 2011, it was discovered that the Plenty of Fish website had been hacked which exposed the personal and password information on nearly 30 million user accounts. Following the incident, Frind said he has identified persons he believes are responsible for the hacking, and said he is threatening legal action in response to the widespread negative media exposure. At the time this received global media exposure and security experts blamed Plenty of Fish for the security and privacy lapse specifically for keeping users' passwords unsecured.

On February 28, 2012, the parents of US Army Lieutenant Peter Burks sued Plenty of Fish. The parents' lawsuit alleges photos of their son, who was killed in Iraq in 2007, were used without permission. The parents were seeking compensatory and punitive damages. Paul Bloudoff, the firm's legal affairs manager responded by saying "Lt. Burks’ image was never used by POF.com in any way, shape or form, [a] third-party advertiser, with no affiliation to Plenty of Fish, ran an advertisement promoting another dating site using Lieutenant Burks’ picture, and one of the places this advertiser ran this advertisement happened to be our site."

In an August 2012 Forbes interview, Markus Frind stated that based on the millions of relationships and marriages Plenty of Fish has created over the past several years, it is estimated that over one million babies have been born as a result of the website.

On May 20, 2013, Frind implemented several changes to the website with the stated goal of focusing on "meaningful relationships". Among these changes were the removal of the "intimate encounters" option. A related eliminated feature was the option to contact clients of age differences greater than "Markus", presumably Frind, found tasteful. Although the Plenty of Fish site and its "matching" criteria continue to match couples with age differences greater than the 14-year guideline, attempts to contact these "matches" resulted in an inbox message from Markus stating, among other things, "[t]here is no reason for a 50 year old man to contact a 18 year old woman." Another restriction implemented in the updates is that male users could no longer attach images to messages. Additionally, the site automatically blocks messages from male users containing certain words while showing such messages as being sent.

The image sending restriction was apparently reversed after Plenty of Fish was acquired by Match Group (but not "quick messages" directly from the match's profile page) and members outside of the 14-year age limit no longer appear as matches or in searches. Attempting to contact members outside of the 14-year limit now displays a page stating the user does not meet the member's contact criteria (even when untrue) and suggests several matches to contact instead of sending a message to the user's inbox.

In March 2015 Plenty of Fish Media Inc. was fined $48,000 for alleged violation of Canada's anti-spam law.

On July 14, 2015, Plenty of Fish was sold for $575 million to Match Group (owner of Match.com, OkCupid, Tinder and Hinge, based in Dallas, Texas). The headquarters remain in Vancouver and have recently been expanded.

In August 2015, POF users were targeted by cyberattacks via a malicious adlink.

In December 2019, Plenty of Fish pushed out a fix for its app after a security researcher found it was leaking information that users had set as private on their profiles, including hidden names and postal codes.

In March 2020, Plenty of Fish (now owned by Match Group) launched a livestream feature after a partnership to interact with users from other apps MeetMe and Skout (both owned by The Meet Group) and Zoosk (owned by Spark Networks).

== Staff ==
The site relied on volunteers to monitor forums and sort through the 50,000 new photos that, at most come in each day. By 2019, Plenty of Fish employed over 100 people, including programmers, marketing managers, product managers, designers and customer success representatives.

== Technical details ==
Plenty of Fish uses a Microsoft-based platform for itself, including IIS, ASP.NET, and Microsoft SQL.

== Historical statistics ==
- Registered users: 100,000,000 (March 2015)
- Dating site ranking in the UK: 1 (Comscore May 2011)
- Dating site ranking Worldwide: 1 (Hitwise, August 2011)
- U.S. site by market share: 1, with 18.57% of the market (Hitwise, August 2012)
- Number of page views a month: 2 Billion (April 2012)
- Amid the COVID-19 pandemic, Plenty of Fish reported a 0.7% increase in monthly active users in the final quarter of 2020.

== See also ==
- Comparison of online dating services
- Timeline of online dating
