= Mandy Ginsberg =

American businesswoman and manager

- Born: 1969 or 1970 (age 56–57)
- Education: University of California, Berkeley; University of Pennsylvania
- Occupation: Businesswoman
- Known for: CEO of Match Group

Amanda Ginsberg is an American businesswoman and executive who served as the chief executive officer (CEO) of Match Group from 2017 to 2020.

== Early life and education ==
Ginsberg (of Jewish decent) was born in 1969/1970. She grew up in Dallas, where she was educated at the Hockaday School. She graduated from the University of California, Berkeley in 1992 and subsequently obtained an MBA from The Wharton School of the University of Pennsylvania.

== Career ==
In her early career Ginsberg was Vice President of Consumer Technology for Edelman Public Relations Worldwide, and subsequently became Vice President of Worldwide Marketing at JDA Software.

In 2006, Ginsberg joined IAC, where she has since worked in different positions. In 2008 she became executive vice-president and general manager of Match Group’s North American operations and in 2010 was nominated as CEO of the Match Group Americas, where she continued to focused the Match U.S. brand, Match Affinity Brands, OkCupid, PlentyOfFish, ParPerfeito and the brands north and south American expansion. She also was CEO of the IAC's Tutor.com, and when the company bought The Princeton Review in 2014, Ginsberg continued as CEO of the newly formed company.

In August 2017, Ginsberg became the CEO of Match Group. When Ginsberg took over operations she had the entire company audited, to secure equal pay between men and women. She also promoted a system of pay raises, without employees demanding them. In January 2020, Ginsberg stepped down from her position as the CEO of Match Group for personal reasons and was replaced by Shar Dubey.

Ginsberg joined the boards of Uber in 2020 and ThredUp in early 2021. In October 2022, she joined Advent International as operating partner. Ginsberg joined the board of Flo Health, Inc. in 2025.

== Personal life ==
Ginsberg is married for the second time and has two daughters. Her house in North Dallas was destroyed by a tornado in October 2019.
