= Meetic =

French online dating service

- Type: Subsidiary
- Industry: Online dating service
- Founded: 2001
- Headquarters: Paris, France
- Key people: Matthieu Jacquier, CEO
- Revenue: €133.6 M (Europe, 2008)
- Parent: Match Group
- Website: www.meetic.com

Meetic is a French online dating service founded in November 2001. It is recognized for its intuitive interface and matching algorithms that suggest potential partners to users based on profile attributes. Meetic became a part of the Match Group in 2011.

In addition to its core brands—Meetic, LoveScout, Match UK, and Lexa—Meetic has launched niche dating services to cater to specific demographics. In 2017, Meetic introduced Ourtime, a dating platform designed for singles over 50. In 2024, the company launched Even, a dating app specifically for single parents, aiming to provide a supportive and tailored dating experience.

== History ==
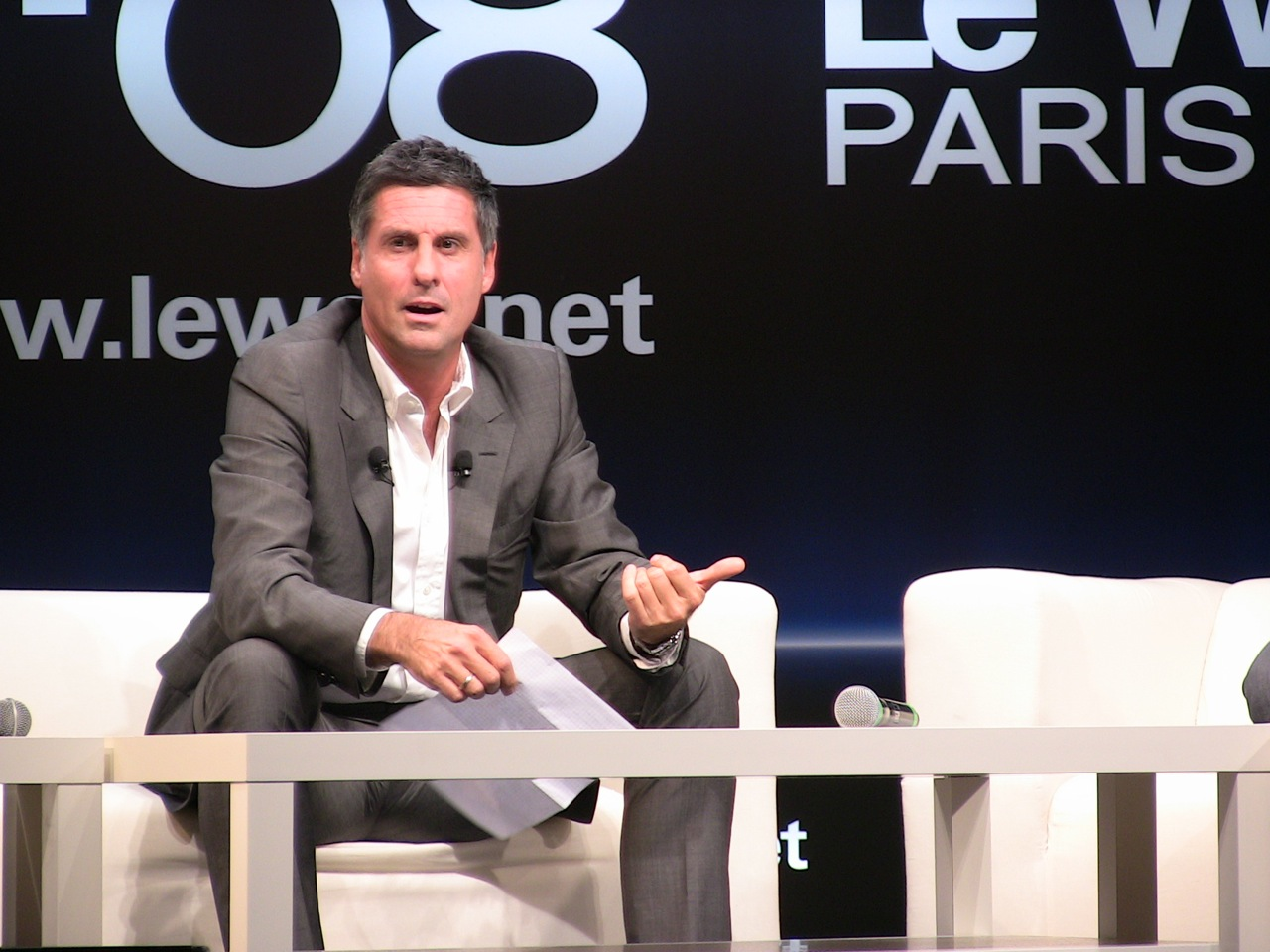
Marc Simoncini, founder of Meetic

In November 2001, Marc Simoncini started Meetic as a dating website. It became publicly quoted in October 2005.

In 2007, according to JupiterResearch, Meetic was the largest online dating service in Europe with 525,000 subscribers. The service's slogan was "Same game, new rules."

In 2013, Meetic was acquired by IAC and thus became a part of the leading Match Group. In December, Meetic launched the Stepout application where people can find out who likes them nearby.

== Acquisitions ==
In February 2009, the company acquired the European activities of Match.com and grew to more than 30 million subscribers.

In December 2012, the Meetic Group bought Massive Media, the parent company of Twoo.com.

== See also ==
- Timeline of online dating services
- Comparison of online dating services
