= Cuffing season =

Cultural trend

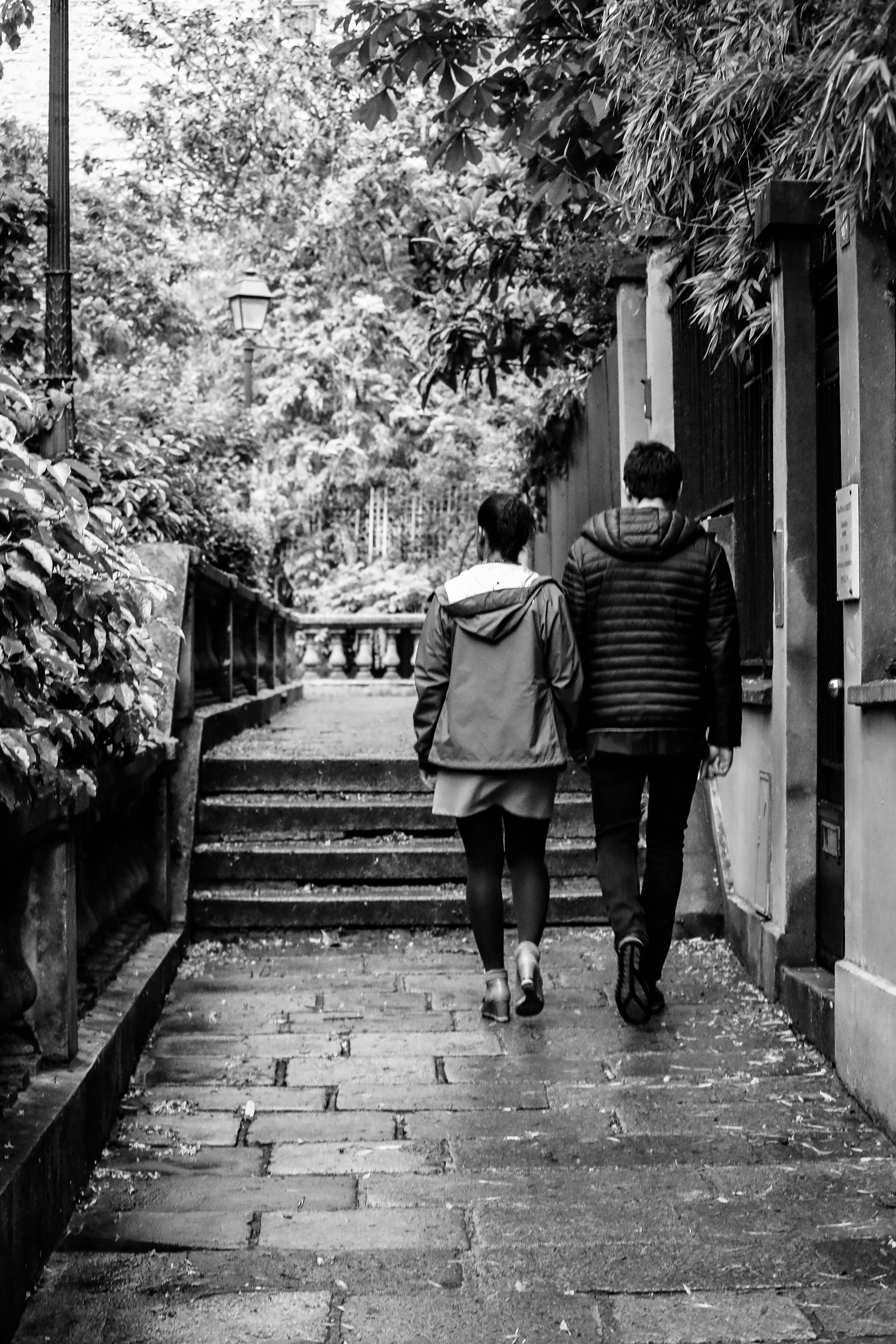
Cuffing season generally begins in autumn when the weather turns colder.

Cuffing season is typically defined as the time of year when single people are thought to actively search for short-term romantic partners to spend the colder months with, typically (in Northern Hemisphere locations) from October through March, culminating with Valentine's Day. The slang term "cuff" alludes to handcuffs and means metaphorically to attach oneself to another individual.

Cuffing season is said to commence at the start of autumn when the weather starts to get cold. Lack of sunlight, outdoor recreation, and warmth presumably leads some single people to become lonely and desperate for companionship. In addition, being in a relationship in the winter months allows for companionship during holidays. Some writers suggest that the rise of dating apps like Tinder further contributed to the phenomenon, and caution that engaging in relationships with such a superficial basis may lead to emotional drama in the long term. According to one popular dating advice website, two out of three cuffed partnerships end by June.

== Scientific basis ==
There is no evidence that cuffing season has a biological basis; the evidence for the phenomenon "seems to be mostly anecdotal, and some experts are skeptical" that it even exists. Others contend that there may be hormonal changes during winter that relate to the phenomenon, and that colder temperatures and darker days may affect melatonin and serotonin levels, which theoretically could affect a person's mood in a way that leads to cuffing. According to Facebook data, people often change their relationship status to "in a relationship" between October and February, and a significant number change it back to "single" in March.

== Origin of the term ==
The exact origins of the term "cuffing" are not entirely clear. It is thought the term "cuff" originated from the African-American vernacular as a verb meaning to "hook up". Urban Dictionary defined the term "cuffing season" in 2011. Some sources suggest that it was first used by college newspapers in 2011. In subsequent years, the term gained popularity on social media during the fall of 2013 and fall of 2016. The term gained popularity in college jargon and was later used in the title of a 2013 song by rapper Fabolous, which helped introduce it to the general public.

== See also ==
- Dating Sunday
