= Hinge (app) =

American online dating app

- Original authors: Justin McLeod (Founder, CEO)
- Developer: Match Group
- Release: 2012; 14 years ago
- Operating system: iOS, Android
- Type: Dating app
- License: Proprietary software with Terms of Use
- Website: hinge.co

Hinge is an American online dating application. The app displays potential matches one at a time and allows the user to dismiss or attempt to match by responding to a specific piece of information on the other's profile. The service emphasizes uploading user-generated material in a variety of formats, such as photos, videos, voice recordings, and "prompts", as a way to express personality and appearance. The app is fully owned by Match Group as of February 2019.

== History ==
In 2011, Justin McLeod founded a desktop service called Secret Agent Cupid with a small team, including Facebook whistleblower Frances Haugen, which allowed users to connect to Facebook and list which of their friends they had crushes on. In 2012 the project was turned into a mobile application called Hinge which launched in February 2013. The application was designed to be less superficial than Tinder, positioning itself as an alternative to swipe-based dating apps. Before Hinge gained enough users to sustain the business, the company nearly ran out of funding. McLeod spent much of the remaining money on a launch party in Washington, D.C., which helped the company secure additional funding.

In 2017, Hinge received more mentions than any other dating app in the "Weddings" section of The New York Times. Hinge Matchmaker was released in September 2017, claiming to reinvent online dating for "people that missed out on the dating app craze". Match Group made investments in Hinge as early as September 2017. In June 2018, Match Group acquired 51% ownership of Hinge, with the right to acquire all remaining shares within a year, and came to own 100% of Hinge by the first quarter of 2019. Under Match Group's management, Hinge's revenue rose from $8 million in 2018 to $284 million in 2022. The purchase attracted some criticism from antitrust advocates, who see it as indicative of a larger trend toward monopolization in the technology industry.

The application's popularity was boosted in 2019 when U.S. presidential candidate Pete Buttigieg revealed that he had met his husband on Hinge. Also in 2019, the company started Hinge Labs to research successful matches and fine-tune the app's compatibility algorithm and other features. Hinge was featured on CNET as one of the best dating sites for 2021. A voice message feature was added to the app in October 2021.

As of 2023, Hinge had an estimated 23 million users. At the end of 2023's third quarter Hinge had 1.3 million paying users, up 33% from the year-ago quarter. Hinge's direct revenue grew to $550 million in 2024, when it averaged about 1.5 million paying users, and to $691 million in 2025. In the second quarter of 2026, Hinge had about 2.0 million paying users and $204 million in direct revenue, up 22% from a year earlier.

Hinge annual users 2017 to 2024 (millions)
Year	Users (mln)
2017	2.4
2018	4
2019	8
2020	13
2021	20
2022	23
2023	28
2024	30

== Operation ==
Each profile on Hinge features six pictures and three self-selected personal prompts (with the user's location and height always visible), which encourage users to focus on personality traits rather than solely appearance. Instead of swiping, users must "like" (and, optionally, comment on) a specific photo or prompt if they wish to reach out to other members. Users can send "roses" i.e. super-likes to profiles that most appeal to them. Hinge allows users to filter potential matches based on traits such as height, ethnicity, and religion. Users can also prevent people they know in real life from seeing them on the app by entering that person's phone number, email, and name.

Hinge offers two paid membership options; Hinge+ and Hinge X. Hinge+ grants subscribers unlimited "likes" (as opposed to the eight per day afforded to users on the free tier), advanced match filters, the ability to sort through all profiles who have "liked" them, and more browsing options (nearby users, new users, etc.). Many users with older versions of the platform have noted that they still have access to the 10 likes per day minimum rather than the current 8. This prompts users to be diligent in who they choose to "like" since there is a limited amount, although it does reset daily at 4:00am local time. Hinge X includes all of the features of Hinge+ in addition to prioritizing a subscriber's "likes" to the top of the "Likes You" list of the users they send "likes" to, enhanced profile recommendations, and "boosting" their profile to be more frequently visible on the feed of other users. Users now also have access to the "signals" Feature, which shows user engagement on your account to others viewing it.

As a ghosting countermeasure, a "Your Turn" feature reminds a user to continue a conversation. In 2018, in order to find more compatible matches, Hinge launched a "We Met" feature which allows members to privately confirm that they have at least had a first date with a particular match.

In July 2018, Hinge rolled out its "most compatible" feature, which uses the Gale–Shapley algorithm to recommend one user per day that Hinge claims is the best pairing, determined by their likes and passes. The feature has occasionally produced unusual recommendations. In August 2021, British comedian Rosie Holt tweeted that Hinge had identified her younger brother, Charlie, as her "most compatible match". Her tweet went viral, accumulating more than 23,000 likes, and she noted that the app continued to suggest her brother even after she declined the match. Commentators joked that the siblings could save money by marrying each other, and several users reported similar experiences of being matched with relatives. Similar incidents have been documented for other users, including TikTok personality Brooke Averick, who was also matched with her younger brother on Hinge in 2020.

Hinge formerly used Facebook friend lists to facilitate connections. However, in 2018, the app moved away from using friends of friends as a predictor of compatibility and was redesigned to no longer require Facebook.

== Marketing ==
Hinge marketing focuses on its "designed to be deleted" theme; when two Hinge users fall in love, the app's mascot Hingie is shown being destroyed in various ways such as getting roasted in a campfire, encased in ice, run over by a taxi, or flattened by an air conditioning unit. In 2020, the app launched Hingie Shop, selling products that can be "destroyed," such as bath bombs and s'mores, in addition to apparel and jewelry.

After a video made by Gina DiVittorio titled "The ideal woman according to guys' Hinge profiles" went viral in 2019, the company hired DiVittorio to star in a web series called Cheap Date, which featured her trying and reviewing date ideas that cost less than $20. The series was nominated for a 2020 Webby Award in the "Social Culture & Lifestyle (Video)" category.

== See also ==
- Comparison of online dating services
- Timeline of online dating
