= Matzo Ball =

Annual Christmas Eve Jewish event in the US

The Matzo Ball is an annual Christmas Eve nightlife event and party held in a number of major cities in the United States targeted primarily at young Jewish singles and organized by Mazel Events, LLC (previously the Society of Young Jewish Professionals).

The name of the event is frequently styled as MatzoBall (with capitalization as Matzoball or matzoball) or misspelled as Matzah Ball or MatzahBall.

There are a number of competing social events in Jewish communities throughout the U.S. and Canada held that same night. In addition, Matzo Ball and similar spellings are also used as the names for a variety of other, unrelated Jewish community events in particular regions.

During the COVID-19 pandemic in the United States, the organizing of the Matzo Ball and other Christmas Eve Jewish events has been consistently in flux. In 2020, the Matzo Ball transitioned late to an all-virtual, worldwide online speed dating format, while local Jewish community groups throughout the United States and Canada on the whole did not organize Christmas Eve events for 2020 (although some limited online substitutes were offered), nor did Tribester.com, which had purchased Matzo Ball competitor 'The Ball'. In 2021, the Matzo Ball proceeded with in-person events in seven U.S. cities under the local government pandemic restrictions in place, in addition to a simultaneous online speed dating alternative that night. Tribester.com postponed its event, while some, although not all, local Jewish community organizations nationwide reemerged with events on December 24 (or December 23 to avoid overlap with the Jewish sabbath beginning on the night of December 24).

In 2022, the Matzo Ball was scheduled to be held in six cities, with video speed dating no longer offered. Improved pandemic conditions led to many communities returning to pre-pandemic event organizing, while others scheduled their events earlier in the month to correspond with the Hanukkah holiday beginning earlier in the week, and some traditional events did not return from pandemic hiatuses. Tribester again did not host a 'Tribal Ball' event.

== Background ==
=== Historical ===
Historically, Jews in Europe would hide in their homes and villages during the Christmas holiday, for fear of violence from locals. In the United States, Christmas and Christmas Eve typically serve as times of family gathering and prayer for Christians and many others.

The atmosphere of religious liberalism and tolerance in the United States has offered American Jews the opportunity to enjoy the holiday period.

At the same time, many American Jews do not engage in the same family-gathering activities on the Christmas holiday that Christians in the United States do.

=== Social ===
With Christmas Day a work holiday throughout the United States, there is a space of unfilled free time during which much of American commerce and society is not functioning, and which could lead to a sense of alienation or loneliness for American Jews.

Typical contemporary activities were usually limited to "Chinese and a movie"—consuming a meal at a Chinese restaurant, which tend to be open for business on the Christmas holiday, and watching a movie at the theater or at home, stereotypically a rerun of It's a Wonderful Life.

The Matzo Ball, and similar local events, provide an opportunity to gather, socialize, catch up with old friends, network, drink, flirt, and romance. The event has turned Christmas Eve into a matchmaking or dating event for young Jews and "the biggest singles night of the year." The event is an opportunity to meet "'a lot of like-minded people dressed up to have a good time, network, find their mate'."

Whether "by their own volition or by the insistent nudging of their parents and grandparents," many young American Jews now attend these Christmas Eve singles events. They have become an annual rite of passage for single Jews in their 20s and 30s. For these people, the Matzo Ball also functions as an annual reunion of sorts, offering a chance to see fellow attendees each year.

While some party-goers admit that they attend with an eye toward flirting, romance, or at least finding a short-term makeout or sexual partner, others maintain that they go only to spend time with friends, dance, drink cocktails, and because of a lack of other options on Christmas Eve. (Drinking at the Matzo Ball, though promoted by much advertisement for the event, is officially not endorsed by the event organizers.)

Christmas Eve events such as the Matzo Ball also tend to draw some young American Jews "out of the woodwork" for drinking and socializing who are: (1) otherwise difficult to draw into involvement with the Jewish organizations, and (2) are perceived as more dateable or hip than people who attend typical Jewish events.

=== Event ===
The first Matzo Ball event was held in Boston in 1987 and organized by local social figure Andrew Rudnick.

As a Boston University senior in political science and part-time bartender in 1986, Rudnick attended a Jewish young professionals Christmas Eve gathering at a local hotel, where he found a staid atmosphere similar to a high school prom, with women on one side of the room, and men on the other. The environment, including the strong lighting, waits to purchase drink tickets and to receive a drink, bad music, and stale latkes were not conductive to meeting people and having fun.

Following that incident, Rudnick began developing the idea for hosting an event the next December 24 at the nightclub he then bartended part-time at, Metro. He and his friends built up awareness of the upcoming event through word of mouth, especially through fraternities and sororities with Jewish memberships, posters, and flyers hand-distributed, including at malls. Some coverage of the event by local radio DJs, who invited Rudnick on-air to promote it, and Rudnick's on-air exaggerations about expected ticket sales, helped spread the word and 2,000 people attended the first Matzo Ball. Rudnick soon quit his job in commercial real estate to focus on the organization and event, and expanding to other cities.

The name of the event and the name of the organization were created on-the-spot in 1987. The event name was inspired by Rudnick's Irish-American coworker's question about Jewish cuisine, and the organization's name was thought up by Rudnick and his Italian-American nightclub bosses, Boston entertainment mogul brothers John and Patrick Lyons, who were concerned about offending both Jews and Christians with the stereotypical name Matzo Ball for an event being held on Christmas Eve, and harming the club's reputation. Other names for the event considered by Rudnick were 'Tribe Trot' and 'Heeb Hop', both of which were rejected upon the recommendation of Rudnick's mother, who also found the name Matzo Ball to be cute.

After a successful repeat of the event on Christmas Eve 1988, Rudnick expanded to New York and Boca Raton in 1989, and added Chicago, Washington, D.C., and Los Angeles in 1990.

The event has permeated American Jewish consciousness, even winding up in fiction, and has been cited as a desired destination in online gossip publications, and its Boston event has seen attendance by two professional football players, Julian Edelman and Rob Gronkowski.

== Events ==
=== Logistics ===
==== Tickets and crowd ====
Matzo Ball events are generally held at popular nightclubs in the cities in which the event is located. The average age range of the crowd spans from the 20s through 40s, unless otherwise specified. A ticket purchased at the door can cost $30–40.

Attendance at the New York event can average from 1,100 to 1,700 people, with an entry line forming outside the venue 30 minutes before the scheduled start time. Crowd sizes at smaller venues, like in Boca Raton, can be 800 to 1,000 people, but with a crowd that arrives later, leading to a long line for entry at midnight.

The event typically begins roughly at 9 p.m. and runs through the last call time for the state/locality (although the nominal, official start and end times given for Matzo Ball as of 2018 are 10 p.m. and 2 a.m.), with peak attendance and flirting at approximately midnight.

Rudnick has observed that the best use of the night is to speak to many potential romantic or business contacts over the course of the night, and to follow up and stay in touch with them over the following months to see what develops, instead of spending the entire night talking with only one person.

In some cities in the past, ticket prices had included hors d'oeuvres and sometimes a ticket for a free drink, sometimes limited to early arrivals. The crowd is often well-dressed.

The recommended attire is the same as an attendee might wear to a popular nightclub on a Saturday night, termed "fashion forward", and that is comfortable to dance in.

==== Associated activities ====
Some party-goers to Christmas Eve singles events "pregame" with friends at home before arriving at the event.

In some cities, the Matzo Ball has been linked officially or unofficially to other Jewish events on Christmas Eve and Christmas Day, such as volunteering at local food banks.

Rudnick and SYJP have also experimented with a variety of other activities, including Christmas Day pool parties at the same hotel as the Miami Matzo Ball, after-work networking events, singles cruises, Valentine's Day and Passover-linked parties, a magazine, a video dating service, and, in 2015, a dating app called MatzoMatch that used LinkedIn profiles instead of Facebook profiles as the underlying content source so as to allow for filtering by education and work.

==== Co-sponsorship ====
The original official organizer for the Matzo Ball events was Rudnick's Society of Young Jewish Professionals, but as of 2018, it is nominally organized under Mazel Events, LLC.

During the 2010s, an occasional event sponsor of the MatzoBall was JDate (even during those periods when JDate organized its own competing Christmas Eve event in Los Angeles, 'Schmooz-a-Palooza'). As of 2018, the Matzo Ball is sponsored by dating app JSwipe, which was acquired by competitor JDate's parent company Spark Networks in October 2015 in the face of intense patent and trademark litigation against the upstart competitor that had more appeal to younger Jews.

Local groups and individuals have also sometimes worked with SYJP, especially when the event is new or newly reintroduced in a given city.

==== Crowd diversity ====
The Matzo Ball is open to the public, and couples, older people, and non-Jews looking for a Christmas Eve activity are welcome to attend, "though, obviously, it caters largely to young people who aren't spending Christmas Eve with their families or at church" and the targeted demographic is "single Jewish men and women looking to meet each other in an environment that's conducive to having a good time."

In some Matzo Ball cities, a number of attendees are from out-of-town, particularly in cities that have large numbers of visitors or where families tend to gather for the winter holidays, such as Boca Raton, which has many New Yorkers in-town during the holiday period.

At various times, the Matzo Ball has experimented with dividing some of its venues by age into different rooms or even separate adjacent venues, even giving unique event names, like "The Big Chill" and "MatzoBall Plus", to the party catering to 30-somethings seeking a less-noisy environment.

While many attendees choose to go to the Matzo Ball with a group of friends, there are also many party-goers who prefer to go on their own, which also frees them from possible disastrous consequences of bad wingmanning by a friend.

==== Atmosphere ====
Rudnick's formula for the Matzo Ball atmosphere is to find a large venue that can handle the large crowds, and for the lights to get dimmer and the music to get louder gradually over the course of the night. This allows for easier mingling and conversation earlier in the night before the hip-hop and dance/house music becomes loud enough to encourage dancing.

Rudnick rejects the aspects previously associated with Jewish social events, including name tags, announcements, and live bands, because they would be a distraction from mingling, and can inhibit conversation.

Rudnick believes that using nightclubs as a venue helps to ensure that the attendees enjoy their night even if they don't make a romantic connection. Events held at more customary locations of the past for Jewish singles events, like synagogues or hotel ballrooms, or with more formal matchmaking features like name tags and formal conversation times, can lead to an undue stress on meeting a long-term partner, while a nightclub with dancing and music is more likely to lead to a good time regardless of romantic outcome. In addition, the event provides access to nightclubs that might otherwise be difficult to gain admission to on a regular night.

=== Locations ===
Rudnick and SYJP have experimented with expanding the Matzo Ball to new cities when they believe that have found the infrastructure and potential clientele of young, upscale Jewish people necessary to make the event successful.

As of 2022, the event is being held in the following cities:

- Boston, the original site of the event
- Los Angeles
- New York
- south Florida:
  - Boca Raton (a frequent Palm Beach County location for the Matzo Ball before 2009; reintroduced as a location in 2021)
  - Miami Beach
- Washington, DC

(Although Rudnick had previously experimented with dividing the Miami Beach, Delray Beach, Philadelphia, and Los Angeles crowds by age into separate rooms, one for 21-35 year old attendees and another for 25-55 year olds, that is no longer the case.)

In past years, the Matzo Ball also held events in the following cities where it no longer does:

- Atlanta, which had been a MatzoBall site in the past, for example in 2009, but had been omitted for several years leading up to 2014
- Austin, a site in 2014 and an announced site in 2008
- Charleston, in 2012
- Charlotte, a site in 2014
- Chicago
- Delray Beach (from 2009 until the pandemic, it had consistently been the only Palm Beach County location, replacing previous Palm Beach County cities Boca Raton and West Palm Beach; in 2021, when Boca Raton was again made a Matzo Ball location alongside fellow Palm Beach location Delray Beach, they displaced Fort Lauderdale / Broward County)
- Denver, which was a Matzo Ball site in 2013, and had been a previous location for the Matzo Ball through the mid-2000s, before its absence in the late 2000s and early 2010s
- Detroit, which was a new site for 2014 after Michigan eliminated decades-old "blue laws" in 2010 that had prohibited alcohol sales at bars after 9 p.m. on Christmas Eve
- Fort Lauderdale, one of the cities that had continuously been one of the three south Florida locations before 2020
- Las Vegas
- Montreal
- northern New Jersey - Roselle, a 2013 venue
- Philadelphia, a city that had been a venue in the mid-2000s and mid-2010s, with absences in the late 2000s and early 2010s
- San Francisco, a previous location for the Matzo Ball in the mid-2010s and the mid-2000s, which had generated friction with the local Jewish Federation organized event
- Providence, Rhode Island, in 2008
- Scottsdale, which was a Matzo Ball site in 1993, when it was co-hosted with video dating service Great Expectations, was at least an announced site in 2008 and 2014
- Seattle, beginning in 1994, which led to conflict with the local Jewish Federation, which already had an event named Matzah Ball on Christmas Eve
- Toronto (planned for 2009, but apparently withdrawn; not to be confused with the independent Toronto Matzoball event functioning since 1988)

=== Results ===
Rudnick promotes the in-person meetings that take place at the Matzo Ball as an antidote to online dating and its tendency to urge daters to always look for an even better catch around the corner. The event makes real meeting potential Jewish romantic partners, instead of simply viewing their photos and swiping on them in a Jewish dating app or website, like JSwipe or JDate – although Rundnick has partnered with both brands as sponsors at various times and advertised through them. The ability to instantly have an in-depth conversation with a person deemed attractive makes a relationship more likely.

The socializing and flirting that takes place at the Matzo Ball gives rise to many romantic relationships., and Rudnick believes that this opportunity to meet other Jewish singles helps prevent intermarriage, while the ensuing in-faith marriages and Jewish babies that result are an effective force against assimilation.

Rudnick states that "countless" marriages have resulted from meetings at various Matzo Balls (and stopped counting after reaching the 1,000 mark). Rudnick himself met his wife at a Matzo Ball in 1997, where she tended bar.

Rudnick finds that people who attend a Matzo Ball event tend to be motivated to meet other Jewish singles, which makes the events a conducive environment for finding someone for a relationship.

As of the mid-2010s, there is a "second generation" of Matzo Ball attendees — children born to parents who first met at the Matzo Ball in previous decades — who are now old enough to attend.

Rudnick also attributes some of the success and popularity of the Matzo Ball to the fact that the attendees are able to party in a venue that is very trendy and that can be otherwise difficult to be admitted to.

== Competitors ==
There are also a number of competitors to the Matzo Ball, and other events organized in cities where no Matzo Ball is held.

The competition among the Christmas Eve parties has occasionally been stiff, especially during the "Matzo Ball wars of the early 90s", with use of similar-sounding event names, touts and bouncers to chase away those touts outside events, and ticket dumping to "crush" the competition.

=== The Ball ===
A major competitor to the Matzo Ball, and often confused with it, has been known simply as "The Ball", which began in 1994 under organizer LetMyPeopleGo.

(As of 2018 and LetMyPeopleGo joining Tribester.com, The Ball was renamed "The Tribal Ball" and was not scheduled to be held in 2018, opting instead to restart on Christmas Eve 2019. It was also not held during the pandemic years of 2020, 2021, and 2022.)

In New York City, The Ball has focused on having separate venues, five as of the early 2010, targeted by age demographic, and with attendees receiving limousine service between venues, although party-goers must purchase an all-access pass to attend all five events.

The Ball's perceived reputation has been of having a harder partying crowd and being more raucous.

In 2008, the organizer of The Ball, LetMyPeopleGo, attempted to expand the event into 24 other cities with significant Jewish populations. In almost all of those cities, with local marketing and co-hosting of the event performed by JDate, it was cancelled near the event date.

However, the Los Angeles version of The Ball, which was instead co-sponsored and co-marketed by the young adults divisions of the LA Guardians, the Los Angeles Jewish Home for the Aging foundation, was successful and held again in 2009. The co-sponsorship continued, raising money for the LA Jewish Home, through 2012. In 2013, the Guardians and The Ball broke off their association, as the Guardians began organizing their own Christmas Eve event. The Ball, in turn, partnered nationally with online dating sites Match.com and OkCupid, both of which advertised The Ball events across the country to their members.

As of 2014, The Ball held Christmas Eve events in two cities: Los Angeles and New York.

=== Niche and local events ===
==== New York City ====
Other New York City Jewish Christmas Eve events have included parties for "the pro-Israel crowd, Jewish gays and lesbians, and downtown Jewish hipsters."

The sheer number of events, combined with the compactness of Manhattan, means that events may be held within a short walking distance, if not eyesight of one another.

==== Chicago ====
Likewise, by the late 2000s, Chicago Jewish Christmas Eve events ran the gamut of tastes and preferred crowd. These included gatherings named 'Rockmitzvah', 'Hubukkah', the 'Heebonism' bash (sponsored by Heeb Magazine), and the more mainstream 'The Juju Ball' and 'Retro Eve', a long running but now defunct event. As of 2018, the local Jewish community group young professional divisions jointly sponsor the Matzo Bash.

==== Washington, DC ====
In Washington, D.C., a competitor and alternative to the Matzo Ball since 1994 has been the Gefilte Fish Gala, an event with no admission charge but only a requested donation. It was originally hosted by the DC JCC before becoming sponsored by a collection of young professional groups. Unlike other similar events, when the evening of December 24 falls on the Jewish sabbath, Friday night, this event is moved to December 23.

During the 1990s and early 2000s, an additional event in the DC area was the Falafel Ball, hosted by a Jewish young professionals group in both Bethesda and DC proper.

Beginning in 2010, an informal group of Washington, DC, Jewish young professionals decided to organize another competitor to the Matzo Ball, the Falafel Frenzy, with all proceeds going to charity. The event has been successful in collecting money for local charities and continues to be held.

==== Atlanta ====
Christmas Eve events for single Atlanta Jews in the 1970s through 1990s included country music themed parties and parties hosted at the Masquerade nightclub by "David and David".

In the 1900s and 200s there were also competing events for mainstream audiences, such as an annual "Matzah Ball", unrelated to the SYJP event, and the 'Bagel Bash', and niche groups, such as the local NCJW section's 'Santa Klutz Ball' for older singles.

With the Matzo Ball's departure from Atlanta in 2011, the local community consolidated into a single major event, the Bagel Bash. By 2015, Bagel Bash was succeeded by Gozapalooza, and faced competition from the return of the Matzo Ball and a music event called the Jew Jam. Gozapalooza continued through 2017. Older singles also had their own events, including an unaffiliated 'Matzo Ball' in 2017, renamed 'Jewzapalooza!' in 2018.

==== Houston ====
For a number of years, the Houston JCC sponsored that city's annual 'Bagel Ball' Christmas Eve party, which is now run independently.

=== Heeb Magazine 'Heebonism' events ===
Heeb Magazine sponsored and organized its 'Heebonism' events in various U.S. cities on Christmas Eve, targeted toward a "hip" audience seeking an alternative to events like the Matzo Ball, beginning in the late 2000s. By 2009, Heebonism had expanded to five cities nationally. Nationally, Heebonism organizers sought to offer a more "culturally substantive" and non-conformist event, with activities including "strip dreidel", video games, and light food. At the Los Angeles/Palm Springs Heebonism in 2009, strip dreidel was led by porn stars James Deen and Joanna Angel. In Denver, the local Heebonism event had its origin as a private pre-party for those seeking alternative entertainment before heading to the Matzo Ball. In 2010, Heeb ceased production of its magazine and became an online only publication but publisher Josh Neuman stated that the entity still intended to organize its annual Christmas eve Heebonism parties. However, Heebonism events retrenched and the Heebonism 2014 New York event was the last advertised.

=== Jewish community organized events ===
Other major cities have homegrown and well-attended Christmas Eve Jewish singles events, typically run by local Jewish community organizations in cities in which the Matzo Ball and The Ball have not held events or in which they did not stay.

==== Federation YAD/YLD ====
Events sponsored by local Jewish Federations' young professionals divisions, often in conjunction with other local Jewish groups, include Chicago's Matzo Bash, Columbus's Mazel Bash, Austin's Mazel Ball, Phoenix's Mazelpalooza, St. Louis's Lollapajewza, Seattle's Latkepalooza (moved to December 22 for 2018), Cincinnati's Latkapalooza, San Francisco's The Latke Ball, Detroit's Latke Vodka, and Tampa's Vodka Latke.

==== Jewish Community Centers/Hillels/FIDF ====
Christmas Eve events run by local Jewish Community Centers, typically by their young adults division, include Orlando's Twelve24 and Dallas's Matzoh Ball (sometimes spelled as Matzah Ball) (in conjunction with the local Federation young adults division). Discontinued events include Las Vegas's 'Light it Up', previously named the Bagel Ball.

San Diego's local chapter of FIDF hosts their Jewbilee event, Denver's B'nai B'rith hosts their Jewbilee Bash, the Minneapolis media outlet TC Jewfolk co-hosted their Jewbilee music event, and Cleveland's synagogue Anshe Chesed Fairmount Temple's Young Professionals co-hosts its The Winter Jubilee event, a successor to the Wrap Up Bash, with the local federation young adult division, Hillel, and other groups.

=== Schmooz-a-Palooza ===
Schmooz-a-Palooza was a long-running Christmas Eve Jewish singles event in Los Angeles. It originated in 1993 with Stu & Lew Productions (which was later acquired by JDate in 2006). The event evolved over the years from a social mixer to a party atmosphere, bringing together, for example, southern Californians who had not seen each other since their younger years in Jewish communal settings. It was also a noted opportunity for reconnecting and romance, seen as akin to offline JDate.

By the 2010s, Schmooz-a-Palooza faced competition from numerous other local events, including a local young Jewish professionals charitable group's directly competing mixer and a Jewish comedy night at the Laugh Factory, along with more loosely organized events, such as music performances by Jewish musicians and informal socializing and drinking organized by local Moishe Houses.

Between the mid-1990s and mid-2010s, the Matzo Ball ceded the Los Angeles region to Schmooz-a-Palooza, and starting around 2009, the Matzo Ball instead partnered with JDate and promoted the JDate/Stu & Lew Productions Schmooz-a-Palooza as one of the Matzo Ball events. In 2014, JDate decided to withdraw from hosting a Los Angeles Christmas Eve event, and turned over responsibility for it to Rudnick, ending the use of the Stu & Lew brand, as the Matzo Ball nominally took over responsibility for the event.

== During the COVID-19 pandemic ==
=== 2020 ===
Through the end of November 2020, the organizers of the Matzo Ball publicly planned for a standard Christmas Eve of in-person Matzo Ball events, though with social distancing and other precautions practiced because of the ongoing coronavirus pandemic in the United States. Venues in the various Matzo Ball cities, however, had not yet been determined or named.

In December 2020, the Matzo Ball was changed to a virtual format. It grouped attendees living nearest to any of 16 American cities, three major Canadian cities, London, Sydney, or Tel Aviv (expanded from the original intended city lineup), into regional groups, from which they were randomly matched with singles in the same age range for approximately 20 speed dates of five minutes duration over a two-plus hour period, beginning at 9 p.m. local time. After each virtual speed date, they were given the opportunity to indicate mutual interest, which led to a centrally coordinated exchange of contact information.

The virtual format made more explicit the goal of coupling and finding a boyfriend or girlfriend that underpinned the standard Matzo Ball nightclub party format of previous years. The organizers hoped to establish the Guinness Book of World Records title for the largest virtual speed dating event ever held with the 2020 event.

Rudnick also organized a separate centralized global speed dating event, titled "Jewish Melting Pot", on Christmas Day at 3 p.m. Eastern Time, in which Jewish singles worldwide are matched for video chat without regard to location or distance.

Tribester.com, which had purchased Matzo Ball competitor 'The Ball', did not hold a competing event.

With the exception of Austin and Kansas City, which moved their usual events online, local Jewish community groups throughout the United States and Canada on the whole did not organize Christmas Eve events for 2020. Jewish community groups in Boston, Chicago, Los Angeles, and New York jointly sponsored a virtual event on December 23 that included a speed dating component, through the Trybal Gatherings initiative.

=== 2021 ===
In 2021, the opposing effects of the continuing pandemic and the widespread availability of COVID-19 vaccines, combined with Christmas Eve falling on the Friday night start of the Jewish sabbath, resulted in a range of responses by Christmas Eve event organizers.

The Matzo Ball was slated to be held in seven U.S. cities, under announced rules for attendance that varied based on state and local pandemic laws and ordinances, with the organization also hosting three U.S. regional online speed dating functions that same evening and a worldwide speed dating event the next day.

Tribester.com again did not hold a Christmas Eve event, announcing a postponement until Presidents' Day weekend of 2022.

Many Jewish community organizations nationwide likewise again did not hold a Christmas Eve event in 2021, but some revived their events—whether as normal though with a vaccination requirement to attend (Chicago and San Francisco), or moved to December 23 because of Shabbat on December 24 (Austin, Denver, and Phoenix), or converted into a set of local Shabbat dinners in conjunction with the organization OneTable (Cincinnati). The Dallas Matzoh Ball was skipped for 2021 due to the Shabbat concurrence, while the Kansas City Bagel Bash was canceled in the week before the event due to the late December spike in COVID-19 cases in the Kansas City area.

=== 2022 ===
In 2022, the relative calm in the pandemic situation saw the reemergence of numerous local community Christmas Eve singles events on December 24. At the same time, the timing of the eight nights of Hanukkah beginning a week prior to Christmas Eve meant that some communities moved their young adult events one or two weeks earlier to coincide with that holiday.

Scheduled to be held on December 24 were long-running events in Austin, Chicago, Cincinnati, Dallas, Phoenix, Seattle, San Francisco, St. Louis, and Tampa, while Cleveland, Columbus, Detroit, and Kansas City all held events on earlier dates. Newly introduced to Calgary was its 'Jewdo - Festivus for the Rest of Us' event, and to San Diego's was the 'Not Your Bubbe's Hannukah Party', organized by Moishe House La Jolla and the Mazal Collective.

In Washington, D.C., pre-pandemic mainstay events Falafel Frenzy and Gefilte Fish Gala were not scheduled, but a new event, the Bagel Ball, emerged, held in a bar across the street from the Matzo Ball venue on the same night.

The Matzo Ball was scheduled to be held in a total of six cities (one less than in 2021, due to the elimination of the second Palm Beach County location of Delray Beach). Discontinued was the video speed dating that had been a side offering in 2021 and the only event offered in 2020. Competitor Tribester again did not hold the 'Tribal Ball'. In the midst of an extensive ramping up of Jewish holiday events in New York during the season, Matzo Ball faced competition on December 24 in New York from an Israeli community-focused party organizer holding two events in New York City and from the young adult arm of the Reform movement's flagship NYC synagogue. A prominent New York gay Jewish singles event, Jewbilee, returned, as did Jewish-themed comedy shows on both coasts.

== Similarly named events unaffiliated with SYJP / Mazel Events LLC ==
=== Other Christmas Eve singles events ===
Prior to Rudnick's organizing of the Matzo Ball in Boston in 1987 and expansion into other cities, Jewish organizations in other cities had used similar names for their own Christmas Eve singles events.

The Jewish Community Center of Dallas organizes its annual "Matzoh Ball" or "Matzah Ball" event, having begun in either 1981 or 1984. The event continues to be run each Christmas Eve under that name, now jointly organized by the JCC of Dallas and the local Jewish Federation young adults division, and is unaffiliated with the Matzo Ball event and Rudnick.

Atlanta also had its own "Matzah Ball" for many years.

An identically named Matzoball event has been held on Christmas Eve in Toronto since 1988. After a period of sponsorship in the mid-2010s by the Canadian unit of the Jewish National Fund and organized by Magen Boys Entertainment, as of 2018 it is sponsored by the UJA Federation of Greater Toronto. The event organizers have indicated their desire to expand to other cities in Canada, particularly Montreal and Vancouver.

==== SYJP trademark disputes over Matzo Ball name ====
Rudnick and SYJP have also come into conflict with organizers of other events named similarly to Matzo Ball, including Seattle's Jewish Federation young leadership division, which changed its event name from Matzah Ball to Latkapalooza in 2004 after receiving a cease-and-desist letter from Rudnik's attorneys. The Federation's attorney's had insisted that because of the lapse in SYJP's federal trademark registration for the term in the late 1990s, and because the Federation had been using the term locally during that period, they were entitled to continue to do so.

=== Bowling-related events ===
The Jewish Federation of Greater Los Angeles entertainment division organized a late spring "Matzah Bowl" event for a number of years, beginning in 1996. In Atlanta, the promoter of the 'Bagel Bash' organized an early spring bowling function for singles called the "Matzah Bowl". A 2009 Christmas Eve musical event at Brooklyn Bowl, co-sponsored by Israel's New York Consulate General, was dubbed "The Matzah Bowl". The event derived its name in part from its location in a Brooklyn bowling alley.

=== Other events not targeted at single adults ===
Smaller Jewish community entities have also used variations on the "Matzo Bowl" name for a variety of events, including for knowledge competitions held by individual synagogues and fundraising events organized by chapters of Alpha Epsilon Pi.

The Greater Kansas City Council of BBYO and its AZA Nordaunian chapter sponsor a large annual teen dance called the Matzo Ball, which celebrated its 75th anniversary in April 2010.

== Criticisms ==
The Matzo Ball and similar events have been subject to mild criticism that the events are "meet markets" or, more punningly, "[kosher] meat markets." Women attendees tend to dress inappropriately in a revealing manner, while men at the event are liable to use awkward pickup lines and noticeably prowl.
