= JSwipe =

Online dating application targeted at Jewish singles

- Developer: Smooch Labs / Spark Networks
- Release: April 2014
- Operating system: Apple iOS (iOS 9.0 or later), Android
- Type: online dating
- Website: jswipeapp.com

JSwipe is an online dating application targeted at Jewish singles. It was launched in April 2014, over the Passover holiday, by founder David Yarus and three co-founders under the business entity name Smooch Labs. Yarus, who was also working for Birthright Israel and Hillel at the time of JSwipe's creation, initially viewed the app as a lark before seeing the development of the Jewish dating app as combining his professional interests, passion, and expertise.

Initial funding for the app came from a group of young successful Jewish entrepreneurs. A staff of eight employees worked in Brooklyn on the app. After launch, use of the app grew rapidly in the global Jewish community, with more than 165,000 users by January 2015, 250,000 by March 2015, 375,000 by August 2015, 450,000 by October 2015, and 800,000 by October 2016. By October 2015, more than 40 million messages had been exchanged between users, and, by October 2016, there were more than 100 million swipes, 4 million matches, and 1 million messages each month. It has added freemium features for greater messaging, preference signaling, visibility, and virtual location movement.

The app has resulted in a number of marriages.

JSwipe and its parent, Smooch Labs, were acquired by competitor JDate's parent Spark Networks in October 2015, ending contentious litigation between the two outfits.

== Comparisons to JDate and Tinder ==
The app's initial focus and largest audience has been Jewish millennials who were more comfortable with Tinder than JDate, and who were looking for a simpler online dating experience than available through traditional dating services. As of early 2016, 90 percent of JSwipe users were 30 years old or younger. Yarus stated that JSwipe filled a gap among younger Jews who would be embarrassed to be on an existing Jewish online dating service like JDate.

JSwipe is perceived as being more relationship-oriented, while Tinder is seen as more hookup-oriented, and photos chosen for JSwipe tend to be more modest.

Also unlike Tinder, matches and conversations expire after a period of time, which incentivizes taking action to chat with the matched user.

== App mechanics ==
Users create profiles by uploading photos of themselves and, if they choose, typing a brief bio. They set filter preferences for potential partners by geographic distance, sexual orientation, level of Jewish observance or denominational affiliation, and keeping of kashrut dietary laws.

Potential matches appear on-screen with whatever bio was entered, scrollable photos, and a Facebook-generated list of mutual interests—and earlier in the app's history, a list of mutual Facebook friends. Many profiles contain minimal, if any information, and are limited to photos.

Using a similar technique to the Tinder app, a user swipes right on a presented profile to indicate interest in the other person, causing a Star of David with a happy face to appear; a user swipes left to indicate a lack of interest, and the symbol has a frown; when two users have both swiped right on each other, one of a set of animated sketches of Jewish wedding activities appears.

After a match, the users have the ability to send online messages to each other.

Given the app's penetration within the Jewish young professionals community, users are likely to encounter past social contacts, summer camp friends, and former romantic interests on the app. Users note that only a small percentage of mutual matches tend to lead to conversations, and even fewer to dates. The addictive nature of swiping and matching in the app tends to lead to high user engagement at the early stages, which dwindles during conversation, and which may lead to eventual deletion of the app before it is reinstalled at a later date.

== Litigation with Spark Networks ==
JDate's parent, Spark Networks, threatened litigation and then sued Smooch Labs for patent infringement and trademark infringement, focusing on Spark's patent on computerized secret matching and the combination of the letter "J" with a word relating to dating.

Yarus publicized the legal maneuvers, leading the CEO of Spark Networks, Michael Egan, to accuse JSwipe of “misrepresentation,” “theft,” and “brazen attempt to build business on the back of JDate."

An attorney with the Electronic Frontier Foundation, a non-profit digital rights group, believed that Spark Networks' patent would be found invalid in the wake of the 2014 U.S. Supreme Court decision in Alice Corp. v. CLS Bank International, but noted that it appeared unlikely that Smooch Labs would raise sufficient funding to litigate the matter in court, which might require millions of dollars.

Yarus and Smooch Labs attempted to crowdfund legal fees via the Indiegogo platform, but were unsuccessful.

Journalists noted that Spark had not appeared to pursue trademark litigation against less successful Jewish dating services whose name started with "J" or patent litigation against dating sites using similar secret matching mechanisms. An industry observer believed that the litigation was an attempt to force Smooch Labs to sell the company to Spark Networks.

On October 14, 2015, Spark Networks announced that it had acquired Smooch Labs, thus ending the litigation. The purchase price was later disclosed as $7 million, with a potential bonus of $10 million to JSwipe's four founders if certain earning targets were met.

Yarus stated that he was excited to join Spark Networks, while noting that Spark's management had changed hands since the litigation was initiated. Yarus and co-founder Chad Wood described the acquisition and its effects as "bittersweet" but "for the best."

== Sponsorships and co-functions ==
Since its acquisition by Spark Networks, JSwipe has sponsored a number of Jewish community singles events. JSwipe also organizes other events, typically in New York, like its "Winter Series".

It has sponsored the Matzo Ball since 2018, a Christmas Eve party targeted at young Jews in the United States. The Matzo Ball had previously been sponsored by JDate.

In 2017, JSwipe joined with The Forward to promote its 45 most popular women and men singles from the app, with bios and photos.

== See also ==
- Comparison of online dating services
- Lox Club
