= Single person =

Person not in a marital, romantic or sexual relationship

In legal definitions for interpersonal status, a person who is single is an individual not in a romantic relationship, married, or part of a civil union.

== Terminology ==
Terminology for singleness varies, usually based on gender, language, and country. Generally, singles can be categorized by the following terms: never married, separated, divorced, and widowed.

=== English ===
Terms used to describe single men are seldom used, and carry positive connotations. Single men are often simply referred to as bachelors.

The English language has more terms for single, unwed women. These terms typically carry a negative connotation. Single women are sometimes called bachelorettes, especially in festive contexts in American English. However, the historic term for unwed women is spinster. The connotations of the word spinster have changed so much over time that it is now considered a derogatory term. The Oxford English Dictionary says in its usage notes for the word:

The development of the word spinster is a good example of the way in which a word acquires strong connotations to the extent that it can no longer be used in a neutral sense. From the 17th century the word was appended to names as the official legal description of an unmarried woman: Elizabeth Harris of London, Spinster. This type of use survives today in some legal and religious contexts. In modern everyday English, however, spinster cannot be used to mean simply 'unmarried woman'; it is now always a derogatory term, referring or alluding to a stereotype of an older woman who is unmarried, childless, prissy, and repressed.

Though spinster has a long history of being negative, there are some authors, such as Katie Bolick, who are trying to change the word's connotation into something positive. Additionally, the phrase Old Maid is used to describe an unmarried woman.

In 2019, Emma Watson coined the phrase "self-partnered" to describe her status as happily single.

=== French ===
Catherinette was a traditional French label for women of 25 years who were still unmarried by the Feast of Saint Catherine.

=== Chinese ===
The term sheng nu is used to describe unmarried women who are in mid to late twenties in China and East Asia.

=== Japanese ===
In Japan, men who have no interest in getting married are called sōshoku(-kei) danshi (草食(系)男子 ) or Herbivore men. This term also describes young men who have lost their "manliness".

== Reasons people remain single ==
People may be or remain single for a variety of reasons, including (but not limited to) one or several of the following:

- Celibacy or sexual abstinence
- Aromanticism
- Asociality
- Financial duress
- Their mental health
- Pursuing educational or professional advancement
- Lack of suitable partners
- Changes in perceptions of the necessity of marriage
- Disinterest in marriage, domestic partnership, or other types of committed relationships
- Traumatic experiences including domestic violence, dysfunctional family, rape, or sexual assault
- Marrying later in life
- A neurodevelopmental disorder, such as those on the autism spectrum, can lead to difficulty initiating, developing, or sustaining relationships

Some single people regard and appreciate solitude as an opportunity. Some people stay single by choice. In addition to choosing singleness as a preferential option, there are also those who forgo marriage due to religious orders that prescribe its forbearance. These religious traditions include:

- The Christian monastic cultures of Catholicism, Eastern Orthodoxy, and Oriental Orthodoxy
- The specific Buddhist monastic traditions

== By country ==
=== Statistics ===
Source: OECD

Distribution of single-person households by country (2021)
| Country | % |
|---|---|
| Finland | 45.34 |
| Germany | 43.14 |
| Norway | 42.14 |
| Latvia | 41.08 |
| Sweden | 39.24 |
| Czechia | 39.15 |
| Netherlands | 38.50 |
| Austria | 38.34 |
| Japan | 37.97 |
| France | 37.78 |
| Denmark | 37.57 |
| Estonia | 36.99 |
| Switzerland | 36.88 |
| Italy | 36.64 |
| Bulgaria | 35.81 |
| Belgium | 35.50 |
| South Korea | 35.47 |
| Lithuania | 35.16 |
| Hungary | 34.42 |
| Slovenia | 34.00 |
| Romania | 33.63 |
| Malta | 32.51 |
| Greece | 32.35 |
| Slovakia | 31.40 |
| United Kingdom | 30.81 |

=== United States ===
According to the United States Bureau of the Census, the fastest-growing household type since the 1980s has been the single person. Previously both socially uncommon and unaccepted due to perceived roles, public awareness, modern socioeconomic factors, and increasingly available popular and lengthier education and careers have made the single lifestyle a viable option for many Americans, especially after the Vietnam War.

According to the United States Bureau of the Census, in 2016, single adults accounted for over 45% of the US population. 65% of this group had never been married. In 2014, Pew Research Center notes that the highest percentage of never-married adults between White, Black, Hispanic and Asian Americans were Black Americans. The same study also projected that about 25% of millennials may not get married.

==== Pandemic effects ====
A 2024 Stanford University study found that the COVID-19 pandemic significantly increased the number of single Americans. Researchers estimated that an additional 13.3 million people were single in 2022 compared to pre-pandemic levels. This increase was attributed to the dissolution of new relationships, the failure of informal relationships to develop, and disruptions to the dating market.

The study also revealed that the average American's weekly socializing time had not fully recovered from the pandemic. In 2022, individuals reported spending an average of 4.1 hours per week socializing, which was still below the pre-pandemic average of 4.5 hours per week in 2019.

=== United Kingdom ===
Similar to the United States, single-person households have been seen to be increasingly popular in the United Kingdom. In the 2000s, studies found that more citizens were seen to be valuing their career over personal relationships. The increase in single-person households was also partly attributed to the high self-esteem it can offer to some people.

=== Japan ===
In Japan, it is not uncommon for citizens to choose to remain single. This has been illustrated with many public figures and celebrities. Women typically value friendships over romantic relationships; many continue to have jobs and marry later, or forego marriage completely.

However, people in Japan who do wish to date have reported that it is difficult to find the time to do so due to being overworked.

=== South Korea ===
In South Korea an unofficial holiday called Black Day is observed on 14 April each year by and for single people. Singles who did not receive gifts on Valentine's Day or White Day meet dressed in black and eat jajangmyeon, noodles covered in black bean paste. The dish is one of South Korea's national foods, and is considered a comfort food.

=== Sweden ===
In Stockholm, Sweden, sixty per cent of people live by themselves.

== Civil status and health ==
A study in 2000 by the BioMed Central's public health journal covering the anti-depressant use of 3,500 Finnish people found an 80% increased risk of depression for those living alone. A 2022 finding published in the August issue of Frontiers in Psychiatry using 2,056 studies and data from 123,859 participants found that living alone increased the chances of depression by 42%.

Paul Dolan, professor in behaviorial science at the London School of Economics, explained that "if you're a woman, don't bother [getting married]", as a study from the American Time Use Survey found that single women live longer and happier lives than married women.

People who support singleness have different opinions on it, pointing out that not all marriages are created equal. Healthy people, with psychological well-being, have happy relationships with their partners. In contrast, unhappy marriages will have the opposite effect, "A bad marriage can make a person feel more isolated than being single" according to sociologist professor Eric Klinenber at New York University.

A study of more than 10,000 adults found that married couples were more likely to gain weight during their process of romantic ventures than singles. In other words, married couples have a higher risk of weight gain that may be large enough to pose a health risk, as reported by Zhenchao Qian, professor of sociology at Ohio State University.

== Targeting ==
Dating services are an especially targeted and advertised service for singles. The growth of the dating services and dating events industry has been so drastic that the phrase "dating–industrial complex" (reminiscent of President Dwight D. Eisenhower's term "military industrial complex") has been coined to capture the amount of money and manpower devoted to dating services for singles.

Singles events have been an area of particular growth in singles-related commerce. Many events are aimed at singles of particular affiliations, interest, or religions. Some of the most strongly attended such events are the Christmas Eve party targeted at young Jewish singles in major cities in North America, particularly the Matzo Ball and its big city competitors. A variety of other religious organizations' singles events are also very popular. However, dating via religious-sponsored singles events has also been criticized for fostering invasion of daters' privacy and undue expectations.

In some countries, particular laws may directly or indirectly disadvantage single persons. In the United States, for example, Social Security widow(er) benefits are only available to those persons who have been previously married, and the structure of United States federal income tax brackets can result in paying a marriage penalty or marriage bonus. In many countries tour and holiday operators impose a penalty (often as much as 100%) called the single supplement on those traveling alone.

Older singles are disproportionately targeted by fraudsters, including through romance scams. The US Federal Trade Commission reported those aged 70 and over suffer the highest individual median financial losses from romance fraud of any age group. The Russian Ministry of Internal Affairs, too, identified lonely older people seeking relationships as among the most common targets of such fraud, and approaches are often over a telephone call.

== Depiction in popular culture ==
=== Film and television ===
- A Single Man
- Bridget Jones's Diary
- Entourage
- Girls
- How to Be Single
- Living Single
- Sex and the City
- Singles
- The Golden Girls
- The Single Moms Club

=== Literature ===
- Bridget Jones's Diary
- Single Life: Unmarried Adults in Social Context
- Single: Arguments for the Uncoupled
- Going Solo: The Extraordinary Rise and Surprising Appeal of Living Alone
- All the Single Ladies: Unmarried Women and the Rise of an Independent Nation
- Happy Singlehood: The Rising Acceptance and Celebration of Solo Living

== See also ==
- Singles Awareness Day
- Singles' Day
- Singleton (lifestyle)
