= Double Eleven =

Double Eleven or Double 11 may refer to:

- November 11
- Singles' Day or Double 11, Chinese shopping holiday
- Double Eleven (company), British game developer
