= Black Day (South Korea) =

Unofficial holiday in South Korea

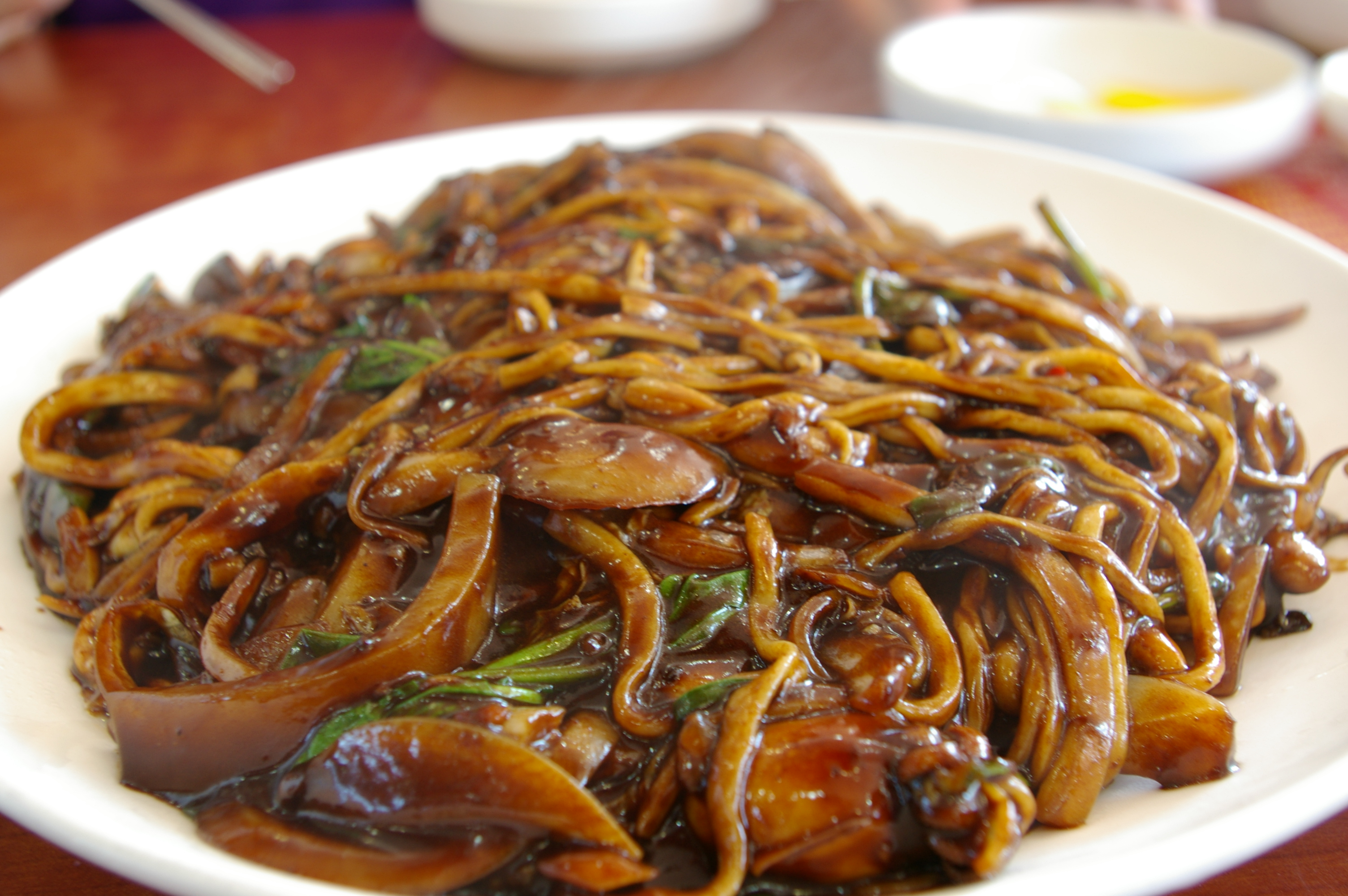
- Jajangmyeon, the most eaten dish on Black Day
- Observed by: Singles in South Korea
- Significance: A third 'day marketing' holiday following Valentine's Day and White Day
- Date: April 14
- Frequency: Annual

Black Day (Korean: 블랙데이) is an unofficial holiday observed on April 14 each year. It is mostly observed in South Korea by singles. The day is intentionally contrasted to Valentine's Day and White Day, which are both on the 14th day of their respective months (February and March). People who did not receive gifts on either of those holidays gather on Black Day to eat jajangmyeon, noodles with black bean sauce.

== Origins ==
In South Korea, Valentine's Day and White Day are both celebrated as occasions to give gifts to significant others. Valentine's Day is celebrated on February 14, when women buy men gifts (usually chocolate). Black Day originally did not exist until after Valentine's Day and White Day became popular. Uniquely, Japan and South Korea are the only countries that celebrate Valentine's Day twice. Because of all the love holidays (14 to be exact) that occur in Korea, many felt that single people also deserved recognition. White Day is celebrated on March 14, when men reciprocate the gifts with their own, also present in the form of chocolate. As both occasions fall on the 14th, other holidays were created by the government of South Korea for all other months to continue this trend. The creation has also been attributed to marketers.

== Meaning ==
Black Day builds on the romantic aspect of Valentine's Day and White Day. As the chocolates received on Valentine's Day are interpreted to symbolize a man's popularity and the chocolates given on White Day are used solely for romantic purposes, Black Day focuses on the people, especially singles, who did not receive any gifts on either of the holidays.

On the day, singles who have not received presents on both days gather wearing black to 'commiserate' over black-colored food, especially jajangmyeon. During the meal, they complain about their lack of intimate relationships and chocolate gifts.

== Celebration ==
Many people take Black Day as an opportunity to celebrate with friends and family. The term celebrating is used loosely. Some people celebrate Black Day with their friends to embrace the fact that they are single, since there is less societal pressure to be in a relationship in Korea today. Other people who celebrate Black Day indulge in comfort food.

The most commonly eaten food on Black Day is jajangmyeon, a popular black bean noodle dish in Korea. People eat jajangmyeon on Black Day because it is a simple, yet delicious dish that one can get at a cheap price. The dish is available at Chinese-style restaurants.

People use this as an opportunity to promote music, food, clothes, competitions, and matchmaking services. Many restaurants and companies use Black Day to promote discounts on their items. Restaurants expect their sales to be double, or even triple, the amount they usually make. Black coffee and jjajangmyeon are two popular food options that sell out very quick on this day.

== Impact ==
This day is targeted by businesses, who hold various events and advertise their products, a strategy known as 'day marketing. The events are highly popular, and include matchmaking events such as speed dating, jajangmyeon-eating contests, and discounts on items.

== Other countries ==
Like Korea, other countries have their own version of Black Day. They use this as an opportunity to celebrate the joys of being single. The United States of America celebrates Single Awareness Day on 15 February, the day after Valentine's Day. Unlike Korea, the United States does not promote Single Awareness Day.

China celebrates Singles Day unofficially on November 11 because the ones of the date represent 'single sticks', a slang term for single people. Like Korea, China promotes many discounts for singles. Single's Day in China continues to be China's biggest e-commerce sale. Alibaba registered $38.4 billion worth of sales on Single's Day alone.

However, In India, 14th February is observed as Black Day as it is the anniversary of the 2019 Pulwama Attack. The attack killed 40 Central Reserve Police Force (CRPF) personnel as well as the perpetrator — Adil Ahmad Dar— who was a local Kashmiri youth from the Pulwama district. The responsibility for the attack was claimed by the Pakistan-based Islamist terrorist group, Jaish-e-Mohammed.

== See also ==
- Singles Awareness Day
- Singles Day
