= Joe Shapira =

Israeli entrepreneur

- ג'ו שפירא
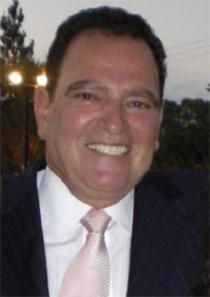
- Born: Givataim, Israel
- Education: Ort Yad Singalovsky
- Occupation: Entrepreneur

Joe (Yoav) Shapira (Hebrew: ג'ו שפירא) is a digital media entrepreneur who resides in Tel Aviv, Israel, and Los Angeles, California.

== Early life ==
Shapira was born and raised in Givataim, Israel. He graduated in 1972 from Ort Yad Singalovsky, and enlisted in the Israeli Air Force, and received an honourable discharge after three years of service, during the Yom Kippur War in 1973.

In 1979 Shapira immigrated to the United States and commenced a career as an entrepreneur.

== Business career ==
=== Sha-Rub Investment Co. ===
Shapira's first notable venture was Sha-Rub Investment Co., founded in 1981 with his cousin, Sheila C. Ruby. The company acquired distressed real properties, renovated and resold them in a rapidly appreciating market.

=== Matrix Video Corporation ===
In 1987 Shapira founded Matrix Video Corporation with Alon Carmel. Videocassette recorders were selling at the retail market and Shapira predicted an expanding demand for blank and pre-recorded video cassettes.

The company soon became one of the largest manufacturers of blank and pre-recorded video cassettes in the West Coast and later executed an initial public offering (IPO) of its shares on the Tel Aviv Stock Exchange.

=== Jdate.com ===
Shapira's most notable venture, Jdate.com, was founded in 1996 with Alon Carmel (incorporated later as Matchnet PLC). Jdate rapidly expanded to dominate Jewish online dating outside of Israel. Led by Shapira, as chairman of the board and chief executive officer, Matchnet raised close to $50 million, including in an IPO of its shares on the Frankfurt (Germany) Stock Exchange, using these funds to consolidate the internet dating space during 2000–2005 via 12 acquisitions totaling more than $30 million. Leveraging on this acquisition as well as creative large-scale marketing techniques, Matchnet expanded rapidly and reached a customer base of more than 20 million to position itself as a global leader in the online dating business. Shapira also led the expansion of Jdate into Israel and the later acquisition of its main Israeli competitor, Cupid.co.il.

== Fiix ==
Joe Shapira recently founded Fiix, a Jewish dating app aimed at a younger audience.

By 2004 Matchnet reached $70 million in revenues, exceeded $400 million in market capitalization, and employed more than 400 personnel in four locations in the US, Europe and Israel. In 2005 Matchnet reverse-merged into the newly formed Spark Networks Inc., and listed for trading on the American Stock Exchange (AMEX).

In 2005 Shapira recruited professional management to replace him as CEO and in 2006 he resigned from the company.

== Pro-Israel activities ==
Shapira has engaged in pro-Israel activities, via the American Israel Public Affairs Committee and US politics. He served as a member of the Republican Senatorial Inner Circle Commission and in May 2008, Shapira and his former wife, Nickie, participated in the Presidential Honorary Delegation to Israel's 60th birthday celebration that was led by President George W. Bush.

During his years as a chairman and CEO of Matchnet, Shapira led Jdate and its customer base, through pro-Israel activation, to become a leading force in the global Jewish community. The New York City-based The Jewish Daily Forward pronounced Shapira in 2006 as "one of the 50 most influential Jews in America", saying “The Beverly Hills-based Shapira may be doing more to further the cause of Jewish continuity than anyone else on earth”. Shapira was also recognized as ORT America's "outstanding member of the year".

Shapira resides in Israel, engaged in the mentoring of young aspiring digital and mobile technology entrepreneurs.

== Personal life ==
Shapira has three children from his first wife.
