= JDate =

Online dating application targeted at Jewish singles

Jdate
- Type: Subsidiary
- Industry: Online dating
- Key people: Adam Berger (CEO)
- Parent: Spark Networks
- Website: www.jdate.com

Jdate, owned by Spark Networks, is a special-interest and niche online dating service aimed at Jewish singles. Along with JSwipe, also owned by Spark Networks, it is one of the largest online dating services targeting Jews. It is accessible via a website and a mobile app.

Members do not have to be Jewish and the service has also attracted non-Jews seeking Jewish partners. Members can mark their Jewish affiliation on their profile.

Celebrities who are or have been Jdate members include Steve Rothman, Brad Sherman, Jesse McCartney, and Dan Markel.

== History ==
Jdate was founded as a website in 1997 by Alon Carmel and Joe Shapira in an apartment in West Los Angeles after the failure of their previous venture, Matrix Video Corporation. Membership grew rapidly by word of mouth in Jewish communities. Shapira left the company in 2004.

In March 2011, Jdate sued online dating sites 2RedBeans, Zoosk, and OkCupid over a patent for "automating the process of confidentially determining whether people feel mutual attraction or have mutual interests".

In February 2014, the site had 750,000 active users.

In November 2014, Jdate launched a dating app. That month, Jdate sued JSwipe trademark of the letter "J". JDate's parent, Spark Networks, acquired JSwipe in October 2015.

In March 2018, Jdate launched in German, Spanish, and Polish.

== Awards and recognition ==
- 2006 Webby Awards - award for social networking.
