= Christian Mingle =

Online dating service catering to Christian singles

- Type: Dating website
- Website: www.christianmingle.com

Christian Mingle is an online dating service that caters to Christian singles. The service is one of a number of demographically focused online match-making websites operated by Spark Networks.

Because of the focus on relationships between Christian singles, Christian Mingle is considered a special-interest online personals site. Former CEO Adam Berger has referred to this type of service as "niche" dating.

== History ==
Christian Mingle was launched in 2001 by Spark Networks. The site has over 16 million members.

In the 2013 Webby Awards, Christian Mingle was an honoree in the Religion & Spirituality category. The site also received the Editor's Top Pick - Christian Award from DatingSiteReviews.com in 2015.

In 2013, the company authorized the repurchase of $5 million of its outstanding common stock.

Christian Mingle launched its dating app in late 2014.

In July 2016, Christian Mingle began accommodating gay men and women as the result of a non-discrimination lawsuit. Previously, the site had only allowed users to choose either "man seeking woman" or "woman seeking man." The change removed this profile designation and allowed users the option to see either opposite-sex or same-sex matches.

As of April 2025, Christian Mingle reported 60% brand awareness among U.S. dating service users, with 17% indicating they had used the platform.

== Members ==
Christian Mingle members may choose whether to specify the Christian denomination to which they belong. Some of the available denomination options are: Anglican/Episcopalian, Apostolic, Baptist, Catholic, Lutheran, Methodist, Orthodox, Pentecostal, Presbyterian, Seventh-day Adventist, and Southern Baptist. Members can also choose options such as Interdenominational, Non-denominational or Not sure yet.

Members can also search the site for free, though a subscription is required to communicate with other members.

== Film ==
Christian Mingle The Movie is a 2014 American faith-based romantic comedy film starring Lacey Chabert as a woman who signs up to Christian Mingle in order to meet a man.
