= Spark Networks =

Global dating company

Spark Networks GmbH
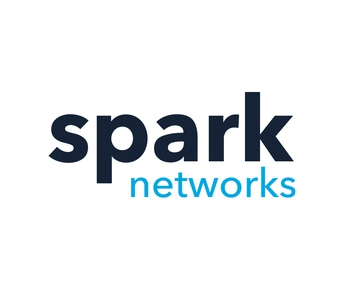
- Formerly: Spark Networks SE
- Type: Privately held company
- Industry: Dating websites
- Founded: 1997; 29 years ago in Beverly Hills, California
- Headquarters: Berlin, Germany; New York, NY, United States
- Products: Christian Mingle; Jdate; EliteSingles; SilverSingles; Zoosk
- Parent: Spark Networks Holdings, LP
- Website: www.spark.net

Spark Networks GmbH is an American-German dating company with a portfolio of brands designed for singles seeking serious relationships. These online dating brands include Zoosk, SilverSingles, EliteSingles, Jdate, ChristianMingle, eDarling, JSwipe, AdventistSingles, LDSSingles, and Attractive World. Formed in 2017 through the merger of Affinitas GmbH and Spark Networks, Inc., the company has a presence in 29 countries worldwide.

On July 1, 2019, Spark Networks closed on their previously announced acquisition of Zoosk, Inc., forming North America's second-largest dating company in revenues. The deal increased Spark's global monthly paying subscribers to over 1 million.

On January 12, 2024, Spark Networks successfully completed a financial reorganization process pursuant to the Act on the Stabilization and Restructuring Framework for Companies (Gesetz über den Stabilisierungs- und Restrukturierungsrahmen für Unternehmen, StaRUG) (“StaRUG”). Pursuant to the StaRUG restructuring plan, which was confirmed by the German Court on January 4, 2024, secured lender MGG Investment Group LP became Spark Networks' sole equity holder in exchange for waiving over $45 million of debt and providing approximately $24 million to support business operations.

== Websites ==
A number of properties are included in Spark Networks’ portfolio, including LDS Singles and Adventist Singles. Other websites include:

- Zoosk is an online dating service available in 25 languages and in more than 80 countries. The founders of the company are Shayan Zadeh and Alex Mehr, who ran the company until December 2014. In mid-2019, Zoosk was acquired for a reported $255 million by Spark Networks.
- ChristianMingle is an online community of Christian singles. The site serves singles who are looking to date and marry within the Christian faith. Christian Mingle has over 9 million registered members. Users can access the site in English, German, Spanish, or French. The plot of the film Christian Mingle features the website.
- JDate is a niche dating site that caters to Jewish singles. It claims to have been responsible for more Jewish marriages than all other dating sites combined. Users can access the site in English, German, Spanish, French, or Hebrew. A survey commissioned by Jdate in 2011 showed 52 percent of married respondents met on Jdate.
- EliteSingles dating app, designed for educated professionals seeking committed, long-term relationships, was launched in 2013 and operates in 19 countries. Over 90% of members are 30+.
- SilverSingles is a mature singles dating app and website aimed at those interested in over-50 dating and long-term relationships.
- eDarling is a European online partner agency launched in 2009 aimed at singles that want to create long-term relationships. The service uses a personality test to connect compatible singles. Users can access the site in German, Polish, French, Spanish and more.
- JSwipe is a Jewish online dating app launched on Passover 2014 by Smooch Labs, and acquired by Spark Networks in October 2015 for $7 million, ending contentious patent and trademark litigation between the two companies.
- CROSSPATHS is a dating app designed to help Christians connect with like-minded individuals who share their faith and values.
- Attractive World became part of Spark Networks from the acquisition of Affinitas, which previously owned the site.

== History ==
The company was founded by Joe Y. Shapira in 1997 under the name MatchNet plc.

Jdate.com, founded in 1997, was the company's first venture into online dating. The company was also home to Christian Mingle, which was launched in 2001.

The company went public on June 27, 2000, on Germany's Neuer Markt.

In January 2005, the company changed its name to Spark Networks because management felt that the new name more sharply distinguished the company in the marketplace.

On March 10, 2005, Spark Networks, PLC filed an S-1 registration statement and went public on the Amex Exchange

On January 7, 2011, Spark Networks, Inc rang the opening bell of the New York Stock Exchange

On November 10, 2014, Jdate launched a dating app designed for Jewish singles.

On October 14, 2015, Spark Networks announced the acquisition of Smooch Labs, owner of the popular millennial Jewish dating app JSwipe. Spark Networks launched CROSSPATHS, a dating app that helps like-minded Christians find matches, on October 8, 2015.

Redesigns of the Jdate and Christian Mingle websites were announced in 2015. In addition to revamped branding, the site makeovers featured technology changes (including expanded mobile capabilities), a re-designed inbox and a new “daily matches” feature. Jdate's redesign went live on November 18, 2015, while Christian Mingle's went live on December 17, 2015.

On November 2, 2017, Spark Networks SE (NYSE American: LOV) announced the completion of the previously announced merger of Spark Networks, Inc. and Affinitas GmbH in a stock-for-stock transaction. The combination created a worldwide online dating platform, with brands including EliteSingles, eDarling, Jdate, Christian Mingle, JSwipe, and Attractive World serving a spectrum of users across 29 countries and 15 languages.

On October 3, 2018, Spark was fined $500,000 and ordered to pay $985,000 in restitution in response to complaints that the site was automatically renewing customer accounts without their express consent. The company was sued by the Santa Monica city attorney as well as district attorneys in four counties.

On March 21, 2019, Spark entered into a definitive agreement to acquire Zoosk, Inc. The deal was finalized on July 1, 2019, forming North America's second-largest dating company in revenues and increasing Spark's global monthly paying subscribers increase to over 1 million.

On February 15, 2022, the company's stocks were transferred from the NYSE American to the NASDAQ Capital Market exchange. In September 2023, the stocks moved to the OTCQX Market.

On January 12, 2024, pursuant to the StaRUG restructuring plan, confirmed by a German court on January 4, 2024, the Local Court of Munich, Germany registered the reduction of the company's share capital to zero (and cancellation of the stock) and subsequently issued new share capital, all of which was issued to a subsidiary of MGG Investment Group. As a result, MGG Investment Group is now the sole owner of Spark Networks.

On April 15, 2024, the German Court certified and formally confirmed that the StaRUG restructuring plan and confirmation order entered on January 4, 2024, are final and non-appealable.

On April 30, 2026, the EliteSingles dating site was shut down.

== Operations ==
Previously based in Beverly Hills, California, Spark Networks is now based in Berlin, Germany.
