= Lox Club =

Online dating application

Lox Club is a membership-based online dating application launched in 2020. Advertised as an "app for Jews with ridiculously high standards," Vogue called Lox Club the "Jewish Raya".

Lox Club was founded by 29-year-old product designer Austin Kevitch, from Santa Monica, California in 2020. Kevitch claimed he created Lox Club as a joke in response to what he called "cringy" dating apps. Early investors included rappers Lil Yachty and Bhad Bhabie. By December 2020, the company had eight employees and over 10,000 members, with a two-week waitlist because every application was reviewed by eight people. In early 2021, the company claimed its waitlist had 20,000 people.

The app is open to both Jewish and non-Jewish members. Kevitch described the app as, "It’s like a deli: culturally Jewish, but anyone can enjoy it." For paying members, the app offers access to a matchmaker, with whom users can message to improve their profiles or find matches.

The app expanded to the United Kingdom in April 2025 with a launch party at Café Koko. Kevich expressed that the app would provide experiences and not just match two people. Members are approved by an eight-person committee that focuses more on "cultural fit than social status."

== See also ==
- The League
- JSwipe
