= Happy Singlehood =

2019 book by Elyakim Kislev

- Cover
- Author: Elyakim Kislev
- Language: English
- Subject: Marriage, the family, sociology of women, gender inequality
- Genre: Nonfiction
- Publisher: University of California Press
- Publication date: February, 2019
- Pages: 280
- ISBN: 9780520299146
- Website: Book website

Happy Singlehood: The Rising Acceptance and Celebration of Solo Living is a book by Israeli author and scholar Elyakim Kislev. It was published in 2019 by the University of California Press.

== Summary ==
The book explores the fulfilling lives of unmarried individuals, showcasing their resilience and innovative approaches to building communities and networks. Through personal interviews and research, Kislev challenges societal norms favoring marriage and highlights the benefits of solo living for both singles and couples. The book encourages readers to reconsider traditional social structures and calls for inclusive policies that cater to the diverse needs of unmarried individuals.

== Critical reception ==
Van Den Berg praised the book for offering a fresh perspective in family sociology by challenging the cultural disapproval of singlehood. She commended Kislev for providing detailed insights into the lives of singles through a wide array of sources, including interviews, blog posts, and quantitative analyses. Van Den Berg appreciated the book's exploration of discrimination against singles and strategies for coping with it, especially highlighting the significance of friendships, independence, and job satisfaction for single individuals' happiness. She also acknowledged Kislev's timely contribution in addressing the overlooked experiences of singles and lauds his suggestions for societal and academic changes to better accommodate singlehood.

Diaz and Lee commended the book for its timely exploration of the benefits and challenges of solo living in the face of shifting societal norms. They praised Kislev's adept use of quantitative and qualitative data to delve into the experiences of singles, highlighting previously under-explored areas such as discrimination and social support. The reviewers lauded Kislev's nuanced approach to challenging assumptions about marriage and loneliness, particularly his findings on the strengths and social networks of older singles. They also noted his balanced presentation of marriage's social and emotional benefits alongside emerging literature suggesting its downsides.
