= Singles Awareness Day =

Celebration of single people

Singles Awareness Day (or Singles Appreciation Day, or SAD) is an unofficial holiday celebrated each February 15.

== Holiday ==
Singles Awareness Day is the flip-side to Valentine's Day meant for those without a romantic attachment. It is a celebration of love in other forms recognizing the love between friends, family and even loving yourself. People who observe Singles Awareness Day reportedly may do so out of spite for Valentine's Day, as a Hallmark holiday, or for other reasons.

On Singles Awareness Day, single people gather to celebrate or to commiserate in their single status. It also reminds romantic couples that they don't need to be in a relationship to celebrate life.

== History ==
According to Dictionary.com, the invention of SAD is often credited to journalist Julian Barnes. According to Barnes, he and fellow high school friends invented the idea in 2001 as a sort of joke to celebrate that they were single, in reaction to Valentines day on February 14, when all supposedly non-single people celebrated their attachments. It comes one day after Valentine's Day, poignantly because this is when unsold candy hearts and other affections of love go on sale. They eventually started capitalizing on their idea in a more literal sense by selling cheap candies and chocolates.

In the United Kingdom, two days are attributed to highlighting single status. Since Single Awareness Day spells "SAD" and a group of dating experts wanted to highlight a more positive tone, they established National Singles Day. It is celebrated on 11 March with the aim to empower those who identify themselves as single.

== See also ==
- 4B movement
- Black Day (South Korea)
- Carnival
- Friendship Day
- Incel
- Loneliness
- Mardi Gras
- Singles' Day
- Singles event
- Singleton (lifestyle)
