= Relationships 5.0 =

2022 book

Relationships 5.0: How AI, VR, and Robots Will Reshape Our Emotional Lives
- Author: Elyakim Kislev
- Language: English
- Subject: Sociology, human relationships, technology and its impact on human relationships
- Genre: Non-fiction
- Publisher: Oxford University Press
- Publication date: 2022
- Publication place: United States
- Pages: 290
- ISBN: 978-0-19-758825-3

Relationships 5.0: How AI, VR, and Robots Will Reshape Our Emotional Lives is a 2022 book by Israeli sociologist Elyakim Kislev. The book explores how emerging technologies, such as AI, VR, and robots, are reshaping human relationships and emotional lives in the 21st century.

== Summary ==
In Relationships 5.0, Kislev presents a historical analysis of human relationships alongside technological advancements. He divides human relationship history into four stages:

1. Relationships 1.0: The hunter-gatherer society, marked by small clans and non-monogamous relationships.
2. Relationships 2.0: The agricultural era, which saw the formation of multi-generational households.
3. Relationships 3.0: The Industrial Revolution, which gave rise to nuclear families.
4. Relationships 4.0: The information age, characterized by the rise of individualism and digital communication.

Kislev argues that humanity is now transitioning to Relationships 5.0, where technologies like AI, VR, and robots will play a central role in emotional and relational lives.

The first part of the book takes readers through the historical development of human relationships and their interaction with technology. Whereas the second part of the book discusses the impact of AI, VR, and robots on future relationships.

== Reception ==
Jinyuan Zhan highlighted the book's forward-looking analysis of the interplay between technology and human relationships. Zhan praised Kislev's historical framework, which traces the evolution of relationships from early human societies to the present, concluding with the speculative future of AI-driven relationships. Zhan noted that Kislev acknowledges both the potential benefits and ethical concerns, such as "societal biases being mirrored in robotic behavior" and privacy issues, while also advocating for responsible technological development. Despite some controversies, Zhan found Kislev's perspective compelling for understanding future human-machine interactions.

In his review of the book, Tatsuya Nomura presented a mixed assessment. He praised the book’s first part and described it as "a journey of knowledge", which effectively traces the historical evolution of human relationships alongside technological advances. However, he found the second part less compelling, due to what he thought as uncertain conclusions regarding the future impact of AI, VR, and robots. Nomura noted that while the book engages readers with its sociological insights, it lacks depth on the technical aspects of the discussed technologies, making it more suitable for general readers than experts.

Rabbi Daniel A. Weiner drew a parallel with philosopher Martin Buber's concept of I-Thou versus I-It relationships, suggesting that Kislev's analysis fits into this framework of understanding how humans relate to both people and objects. Weiner noted that Kislev is optimistic about the singularity, reassuring readers that these changes are part of ongoing technological evolution. Weiner said the book is an insightful contribution to futurism, appreciating its philosophical reflection on whether human relationships might eventually include interactions with artificial beings.
