= Elyakim Kislev =

Israeli sociologist, author and scholar

- אליקים כסלו

Academic background
- Education: Columbia University

Academic work
- Discipline: Sociology
- Sub-discipline: Minorities, policy and technology, and singles studies.
- Institutions: Hebrew University of Jerusalem
- Website: elyakim-kislev.huji.ac.il

Elyakim Kislev (Hebrew: אליקים כסלו) is an Israeli sociologist, author, and academic. As of 2024, Kislev is Head of the Honors Program at the Hebrew University of Jerusalem's School of Public Policy and Governance. He is known for his work on the state of relationships, the impact of technology on social life, and singlehood in the twenty first century. Kislev is the author of Happy Singlehood: The Rising Acceptance and Celebration of Solo Living (2019, University of California Press), Relationships 5.0 (2022, Oxford University Press).

== Early life and education ==
Kislev has a Ph.D. in sociology from Columbia University and three master's degrees in counseling, public policy, and sociology. (Note: Kislev received the U.S. Department of State Fulbright Fellowship and the Award for Outstanding Fulbright Scholars.)

== Bibliography ==
=== Select books ===
- Happy Singlehood: The Rising Acceptance and Celebration of Solo Living (2019, University of California Press)
- Relationships 5.0: How AI, VR, and Robots Will Reshape Our Emotional Lives (2022, Oxford University Press)

=== Select journal articles ===
- Kislev, Elyakim. "Singlehood as an identity." European Review of Social Psychology (2023): 1-35.
- Kislev, Elyakim. "The Robot-Gender Divide: How and Why Men and Women Differ in Their Attitudes Toward Social Robots." Social Science Computer Review 41, no. 6 (2023): 2230–2248.
- Kislev, Elyakim. "The sexual activity and sexual satisfaction of singles in the second demographic transition." Sexuality Research and Social Policy 18 (2021): 726–738.
- Kislev, Elyakim. "Social capital, happiness, and the unmarried: A multilevel analysis of 32 European countries." Applied Research in Quality of Life 15, no. 5 (2020): 1475–1492.
- Kislev, Elyakim. "Does marriage really improve sexual satisfaction? Evidence from the Pairfam dataset." The Journal of Sex Research (2019).
- Kislev, Elyakim. "Happiness, post-materialist values, and the unmarried." Journal of happiness Studies 19 (2018): 2243–2265.
- Kislev, Elyakim. "The effect of anti‐discrimination policies on Middle Eastern and North African immigrants in 24 European countries." International Migration 56, no. 3 (2018): 88–104.
- Kislev, Elyakim. "Deciphering the ‘ethnic penalty’of immigrants in Western Europe: a cross-classified multilevel analysis." Social Indicators Research 134 (2017): 725–745.
- Kislev, Elyakim. "The effect of education policies on higher-education attainment of immigrants in Western Europe: A cross-classified multilevel analysis." Journal of European Social Policy 26, no. 2 (2016): 183–199.
