= Singles' Day =

Unofficial Chinese shopping holiday

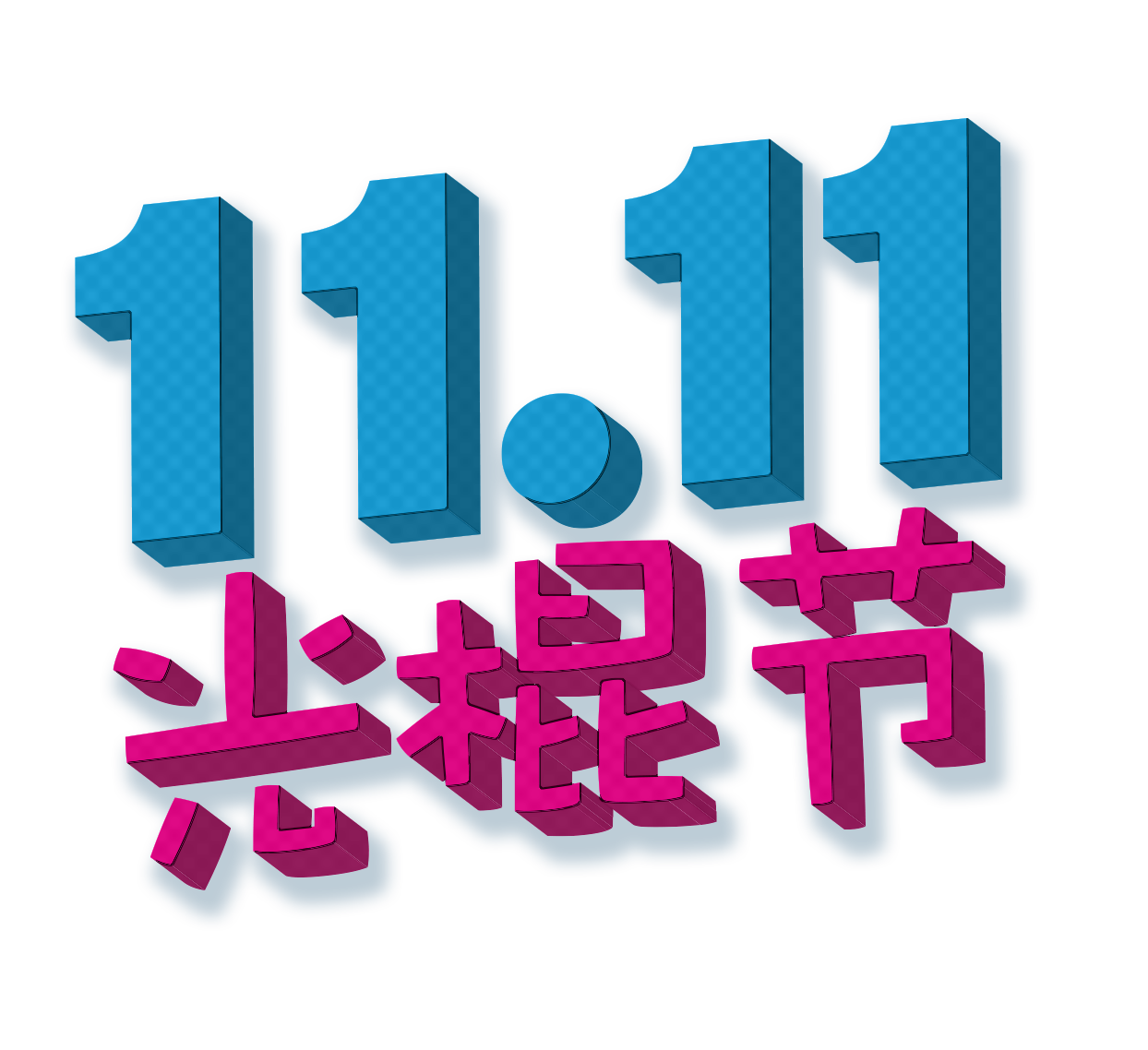
- An illustration for the Chinese e-commerce holiday Singles' Day
- Observed by: Chinese
- Type: Commercial
- Significance: Biggest shopping day in the world
- Celebrations: Shopping, festivals, clubs/bars
- Date: 11 November
- Next time: 11 November 2027
- Frequency: Annual

Singles' Day
- Traditional Chinese: 光棍節
- Simplified Chinese: 光棍节
- Literal meaning: Singles' Holiday
Transcriptions
Standard Mandarin
- Hanyu Pinyin: Guānggùn Jié
- Wade–Giles: Kuang-kun chieh
Wu
- Romanization: ^{1}Kuaon-kuen-ciq
Yue: Cantonese
- Yale Romanization: Gwōnggwan Jit
- Jyutping: Gwong^{1}gwan^{3}Zit^{3}
- Hong Kong Romanisation: Kwong Kwan Tsit
- Macau Romanization: Kuong Kuan Chit
Southern Min
- Hokkien POJ: Kong-kùn-chat
Eastern Min
- Fuzhou BUC: Guŏng-góng Cáik
Northern Min
- Jian'ou Romanized: Guáng-go̿ng Căi

Alternative Chinese name
- Traditional Chinese: 雙11
- Simplified Chinese: 双11
Transcriptions
Standard Mandarin
- Hanyu Pinyin: Shuāng 11
- Wade–Giles: Shuang 11
Hakka
- Pha̍k-fa-sṳ: Sûng 11
Yue: Cantonese
- Yale Romanization: Sēung 11
- Jyutping: Soeng^{1} 11
- Hong Kong Romanisation: Sheung 11
Southern Min
- Hokkien POJ: Siang 11
- Teochew Peng'im: Sang^{1} 11

Singles' Day (simplified Chinese: 光棍节; traditional Chinese: 光棍節) or Double 11 (simplified Chinese: 双11; traditional Chinese: 雙11) is an unofficial Chinese holiday for people who are not in a relationship. The date, 11 November (11/11), was chosen because the numeral 1 resembles a bare stick (Chinese: 光棍; pinyin: guānggùn), Chinese Internet slang for an unmarried man. The four "1"s also refer to the demographic group of single people.

Originally, the date was celebrated by a small group of college bachelors, but in 2009 Alibaba's CEO Daniel Zhang began to use the day as a 24-hour holiday that offered online shopping discounts and offline entertainment. The holiday has now become the largest physical retail and online shopping day in the world, and spread to Southeast Asia. Rivals of Alibaba, such as JD.com, host Singles' Day festivals as well, which garnered US$19.1 billion, bringing the Chinese total to US$44.5 billion total sales volume in 2017. Alibaba shoppers exceeded 213.5 billion yuan (US$30.7 billion) in total spend during 2018 Singles Day. In 2019, Alibaba said that its gross merchandise volume for the whole event came in at 268.4 billion yuan (US$38.4 billion), an increase of 26% from the previous year. In 2021, Alibaba and JD reached a new combined Singles Day sales record of US$139 billion.

In 2022, neither Alibaba nor JD.com disclosed Singles' Day sales results as China continued to face macroeconomic headwinds and zero-COVID-19 challenges, but Alibaba said its results were "in line with [2021's] GMV performance", while JD.com said it set a record-breaking Singles' Day event.

In 2025, Singles' Day generated more than US$150 billion in annual sales, exceeding those on Black Friday and Amazon Prime Day combined.

== Origins ==
Singles' Day, or Bachelors' Day, originated at Nanjing University in 1993. Singles' Day celebrations spread to several other universities in Nanjing in the 1990s. 11 November (11/11), consisting of four 1s, was chosen as it represents four singles.

There are several ideas explaining the creation of the Singles' Day festival. The most widely accepted idea is that the holiday grew out of Nanjing University's dorm culture. One origin story is that in 1993, four male students of Nanjing University's Mingcaowuzhu (all single men) dorm discussed how they could break away from the monotony of being single and agreed that 11 November would be a day of events and celebrations in honor of being single. These activities spread through the university and eventually made their way into wider society. The spread increased with social media use, and the event has become increasingly popular within contemporary Chinese culture and society.

== Description ==
JD sales on Singles' Day
Year	RMB (billions)	Growth
2021	349.1	+28.6%
2020	271.5	
2019	204.4	
2018	159.8	
2017	127.1	

Alibaba sales on Singles' Day
Year	USD (billions)	RMB (billions)	Growth
2021	84.5	540.3	+8.5%
2020	75	498.2	+85%
2019	38.4	268.4	+26%
2018	31	210	+27%
2017	25	170	+39%
2016	18	120	+32%
2015	14	91	+60%
2014	9	57	+63%
2013	5	35	+83%
2012	3	19	+270%
2011	0.8	5	+460%
2010	0.1	0.9	+1700%
2009	0.01	0.05	Ø

Singles' Day serves as an occasion for single people to meet and for parties to be organized. The holiday was initially only celebrated by young men, hence the initial name Bachelors' Day. However, it is now widely celebrated by both sexes. Blind date parties are popular on this day, in an attempt to alter the single status of the participants. Although this date is meant to celebrate singlehood, the desire to find a spouse or partner is often expressed by young Chinese people on this date, while other love-related issues are discussed by the Chinese media.

=== Shopping ===
The event is not an officially recognized public holiday in China, although it has become the largest offline and online shopping day in the world. Sales in Alibaba's e-commerce websites, Tmall and Taobao, have reached US$5.8 billion in 2013, US$9.3 billion in 2014, US$14.3 billion in 2015, US$17.8 billion in 2016, and over US$25.4 billion in 2017. JD.com also achieved a sales record of US$19.1 billion in 2017, while Lazada drums up US$123 million.

As more people join in the celebration of this holiday, many companies have taken the opportunity to target younger consumers including businesses such as restaurants, karaoke parlors, and online shopping malls. For example, the Chinese online shopping mall Taobao sold goods worth 19 billion CNY (about US$3 billion) on 11 November 2012.

On Singles' Day 2017, Alibaba set a world record for most payment transactions during the festival. Its mobile wallet app Alipay processed 256,000 payment transactions per second. A total of 1.48 billion transactions were processed by Alipay in the entire 24 hours.

In 2020, Singles' Day resulted in the mailing of four billion parcels.

Singles' Day is the world's largest online shopping event. The event is now nearly four times the size of America's biggest shopping days, Black Friday and Cyber Monday.

=== Cultural events ===
Singles' Day has become a cultural event. Alibaba usually hosts large celebratory festivals on the night before its biggest shopping day which have featured global celebrities including Nicole Kidman in 2017, Taylor Swift at Alibaba's Shanghai gala in 2019, and Katy Perry performing in a livestream in 2020. Not merely a shopping event but the holiday is also a day when people can party to socialize and meet other people, as well as practising traditions that celebrate the single life.

2011 marked the Singles Day of the Century (Chinese pinyin: Shiji Guanggun Jie) as this date had six "ones" rather than four, increasing the significance of the occasion. In 2011, an above-average number of marital celebrations occurred in Hong Kong and Beijing on 11 November.

== Symbolism ==
The following symbolism has been associated with the special date:

- 1: the digit 1 symbolizes an individual, a single person
- 11: two individuals finding each other and being together on one side of the special date (11.11)
- 2 x (11): a celebration of two or more couples, each comprising two single individuals finding each other on the special date (11.11)

== Outside China ==
Singles' Day has since been popularized through the internet and is now observed at several places outside of China as well. The holiday has particularly grown in Southeast Asia, with customers in the Lazada's Southeast Asian marketplaces ordering 6.5 million items in 2017. In Indonesia, for example, 11 November is dubbed by some e-commerce websites as the "Harbolnas" (abbreviation of Hari Belanja Online Nasional, "National Online Shopping Day"), though it usually took place on 12 December.

In the United Kingdom, National Singles Day is celebrated on 11 March. It was initiated by a group of internationally recognised dating experts in order to help singles either embrace their single status or "do something about it".

MediaMarkt, a German company, promotes Singles' Day in their stores. It coincides with the beginning of Carnival season in the Rhineland region. Belgian MediaMarkt also participates, but reactions have been negative, as 11 November is the anniversary of the Armistice of 11 November 1918 that ended World War I, and the day is associated with somber commemoration of the war dead in Belgium. In 2016, Swedish electronics retailer Elgiganten promoted a Singles Day campaign in Norway before implementing it in the other Nordic countries the following year.

== Trademarks ==
The term "双十一" (Double 11) was trademarked in China by Alibaba Group on 28 December 2012, under registration numbers 10136470 and 10136420. In October 2014, Alibaba threatened legal action against media outlets that accept advertising from competitors that use this term.

== See also ==
- Black Friday (shopping)
- Black Day in South Korea
- Boxing Day
- Sheng nü, so-called "leftover women" who remain unmarried
- Singles Awareness Day
- Singles event
- Super Saturday
- Pepero Day, Korean "Valentine's Day" on the same day
- Pocky & Pretz Day
- Qixi Festival, Chinese "Valentine's Day"
- Remembrance Day, Armistice Day, and Veterans Day, military memorial days observed on the same day, in commemoration of the end of World War I.
