= Christian Mingle The Movie =

- Promotional release poster
- Directed by: Corbin Bernsen
- Written by: Corbin Bernsen
- Produced by: Chris Aronoff; Suzette Schafer
- Starring: Lacey Chabert; Jonathan Patrick Moore; Stephen Tobolowsky; Saidah Arrika Ekulona; Corbin Bernsen; John O'Hurley; Morgan Fairchild; David Keith
- Cinematography: Scott Williams
- Edited by: Benjamin Earl
- Music by: Brenton Costa
- Production companies: Home Theater Films; The Creation Lab; Rocky Mountain Pictures
- Distributed by: Capitol Christian Distribution
- Release date: October 10, 2014
- Running time: 103 minutes
- Country: United States
- Language: English
- Box office: $25,480

Christian Mingle (sometimes promoted as Christian Mingle The Movie) is a 2014 American faith-based romantic comedy film written and directed by Corbin Bernsen and starring Lacey Chabert as a woman who uses the online dating website ChristianMingle to meet a man. The film was released in the United States on October 10, 2014 to VOD. The film received mixed reviews and was released in theaters on October 10, 2014.

== Plot ==
Busy ad executive Gwyneth Hayden has been unsuccessful in love. After a friend's recent engagement leaves her as the only single woman in her group, she sees a television advertisement for the dating website Christian Mingle and decides to sign up. She confesses to her co-worker Pam that she hasn't been to church in years despite having been raised Christian, and before going on a date with Paul, she buys The Bible for Dummies and Christianity for Dummies. After a couple of successful dates, Paul takes Gwyneth to a Bible study group at his friend's house. She meets Jessy and Jimmy, a couple who also met through the site, Gabby and Tommy, who are expecting their first child, and Kelly, a childhood friend of Paul's.

Paul asks Gwyneth to go to church and meet his parents, Lacie and Bill. After Gwyneth meets with Jessy, Jimmy, Gabby, Tommy and Kelly, Paul reveals that he will be travelling to Mexico with his father's construction company to repair a church in Mexico. Gwyneth is annoyed that she wasn't told but is persuaded to join everyone in Mexico. She takes time off from her job but while there her copy of Christianity for Dummies is discovered and she confesses to Paul that she wasn't a practicing Christian when she signed up to the site. They break up and she returns to America.

When Paul and his family returns Gwyneth goes to see him and learns that he is with Kelly. Her boss, Douglas McCarver, has Gwyneth write a campaign to sell a cure for baldness for their client Donny Da Bona, but she cannot lie due to her newly discovered faith and quits to go become a teacher at the village in Mexico. Some months later, Paul returns to the village to tell Gwyneth that he has broken up with Kelly, and he and Gwyneth happily reunite. Gwyneth then, hand in hand with Paul, introduces him to her students. Paul proposes to Gwyneth during the end credits.

== Cast ==
- Lacey Chabert as Gwyneth Hayden
- Jonathan Patrick Moore as Paul Wood
- Saidah Arrika Ekulona as Pam Thomas
- Stephen Tobolowsky as Douglas McCarver
- John O'Hurley as Donny De Bona
- Morgan Fairchild as Lacie Wood
- David Keith as Bill Wood
- Corbin Bernsen as Matt
- Jill Saunders as Kelly
- Sascha Alexander as Jessy McKenzie
- Justin Dray as Tommy
- Tony Czech as Jimmy McKenzie
- Jessa French as Gabby
- Jelynn Sophia as Sable
- Anna Anderson as Allison

== Reception ==
Donna Rolfe of Dove.org, a website which bases its reviews on "Christian values", awarded the film its "Dove 'Faith Friendly' Seal for all ages", calling it "a sweet romantic comedy that is faith friendly". Bob Waliszewski of Plugged In, a publication of the Christian conservative organization Focus on the Family, wrote that "While this flick will never be mistaken for an Oscar contender, it mingles together a number of positive things", praising the film's "clear and unforced Gospel presentation".

Vince Mancini of Uproxx gave the film a negative review, calling it "an unintentional parody of whiteness" and writing that "it's a movie where ching chong background music plays when the characters go out for sushi and at least one kid has to be wearing a straw cowboy hat and walking a pet burro to make sure you know they're in Mexico". Jacob Oller, writing for the website Vague Visages, criticized the film as being "a spastic blurring of the line between infomercial and parody".
