= Single supplement =

Travel industry premium

The single supplement is a travel industry premium charged to solo travelers when they take a room alone. The amount involved ranges from 10 to 100 percent of the standard accommodation rate. Solo travelers see this as an unfair form of discrimination, but vendors justify the charge as reflecting the fact that most accommodations are priced for double occupancy.

Discounts for booking early or repeat bookings and programs that arrange shared accommodation are variations on pricing that can ameliorate the single supplement for solo travelers. Research prior to travel may find companies that have removed the single supplement, or offer solo cabins designed for single occupancy.

In 2026, technology platforms introduced compatibility matching to facilitate cost-sharing among solo travelers to circumvent the single supplement.

In 2013, around 12 percent of American adults planned to travel solo that year.

== Background ==
Vendors and agents in the travel industry quote package-deal and accommodation prices in terms of dollars per person when the customer travels in a group of two, that is, "twin share" or "double". The single supplement is a premium surcharge applied to a traveler who travels alone but will use a room that could fit two or more passengers.

Accommodation vendors argue that solo travelers should expect to pay for the luxury and convenience of having a room to themselves. Vendors also expect to be compensated for the cost of preparing a room for a guest, in cleaning and providing disposables, when only one person will be charged. Some vendors also charge more because they believe a solo traveler will spend less on food, drinks, and entertainment compared to a group of two or more.

The solo traveler argues that traveling alone is often a necessity rather than a luxury and that the cost of preparing rooms for guests should be distributed among customers without discrimination, or (more extremely) that couples should be surcharged for the privilege of not having to sleep apart.

Those affected may choose an accommodation vendor or tour operator which caters specifically for the solo traveler. Singles networks may assist in finding a compatible travel companion.

== Framing effect ==
Objections to the single supplement may be partly explained by the "framing effect" described by Nagle and Holden in 2002. This effect occurs when customers see cost as a combination of gains and losses. Take as example, a hotel room advertised at #£300, with a £25 discount for early booking and compare it with the same room at #£250, with a 10% single person surcharge. Customers will tend to choose the arrangement even though the cost of £275, is the same. Customers tend to choose gains over losses. An early booking discount is seen as a gain, whereas a surcharge is seen as a loss.

== See also ==
- Digital nomad
- Tourism in Thailand
