= Singles event =

Event intended to facilitate romantic relationships

A singles' event is an activity or program made available specifically to the romantically unattached, often with the underlying or explicit purpose of fostering dating or relationships among attendees.

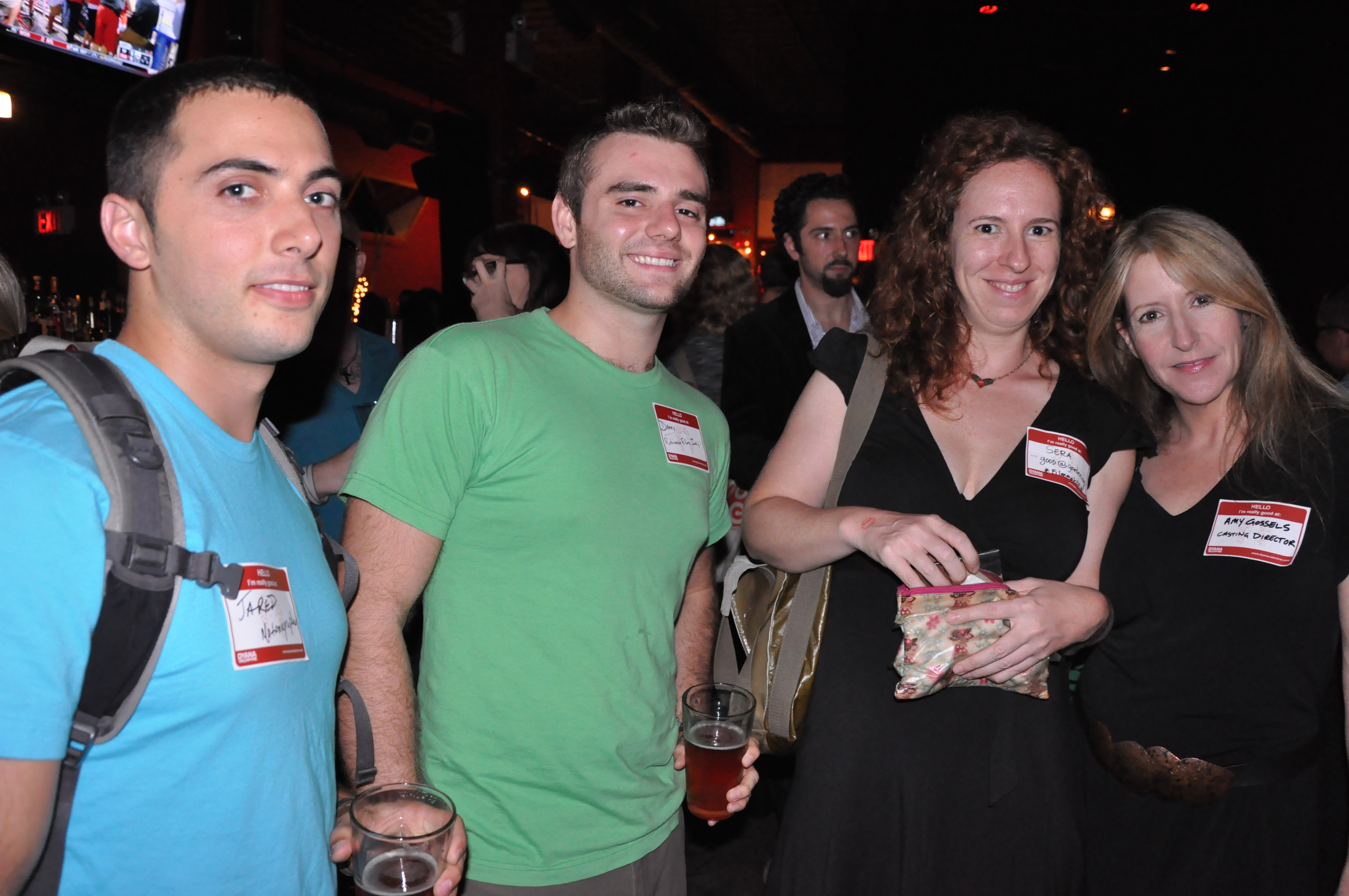
People at a singles event

A singles event with a cocktail party-type atmosphere is also sometimes referred to as a mixer. However, the term "mixer" can also refer to a networking event in general and not just one geared towards singles.

== Logistics ==
Singles' events are run by organizations focused on building stability in their areas, such as religious organizations and community groups.

Some local businesses, sports teams, and cultural establishments also hold singles events.

The themes of singles events can cover a broad spectrum. These can include, for example, ski trips, Academy Award viewing parties, dinners, holiday parties, art gallery visits, and Valentine's Day mixers.

Some single events are the Christmas Eve parties targeted at young Jewish singles in major cities in North America, particularly the Matzo Ball and its large city competitors.

Singles' events have been an area of particular growth in singles-related commerce.

== Praise ==
Singles events have been praised as "ideal settings for meeting people" because attendees are ostensibly present to meet someone and are open to the idea of becoming romantically attached.

== Criticisms ==
=== General ===
The attendees of singles events have been criticized as "needy folks without a lot to offer". Dating via religious-sponsored singles events has been criticized for fostering invasion of daters' privacy and undue expectations. Sex ratios of singles events have been criticized, with many either having too many women or too many men depending on location or targeted race, age, and income groups. As a result, many events often have a policy to even out sex ratios before the event starts.

=== Meet/meat market ===
Singles events, including those organized by religious organizations, have been criticized for frequently being meet/meat markets—places where attendees are rapidly sizing up members of the opposite sex with objectifying criteria, such as attractiveness, wealth, and fashion sense, before taking the time to get to know attendees on a deeper level.

By the 1970s, singles events had developed a reputation as a "ritual of lies and mistrust", replete with men in search of casual sex, cold and unfriendly women, and frequent misunderstandings.

The nature of meet markets has changed dramatically since the 1980s, becoming more inviting, and the term itself has largely become value-neutral or positive.

=== Naming and 'Young Professionals' events ===
The stigma that developed in the 1970s around singles events led some organizations to switch to the euphemism "young professionals events". (However other organizations specifically for young professionals insist that they are not "singles groups".)
