= Huggle (app) =

Location-based social application

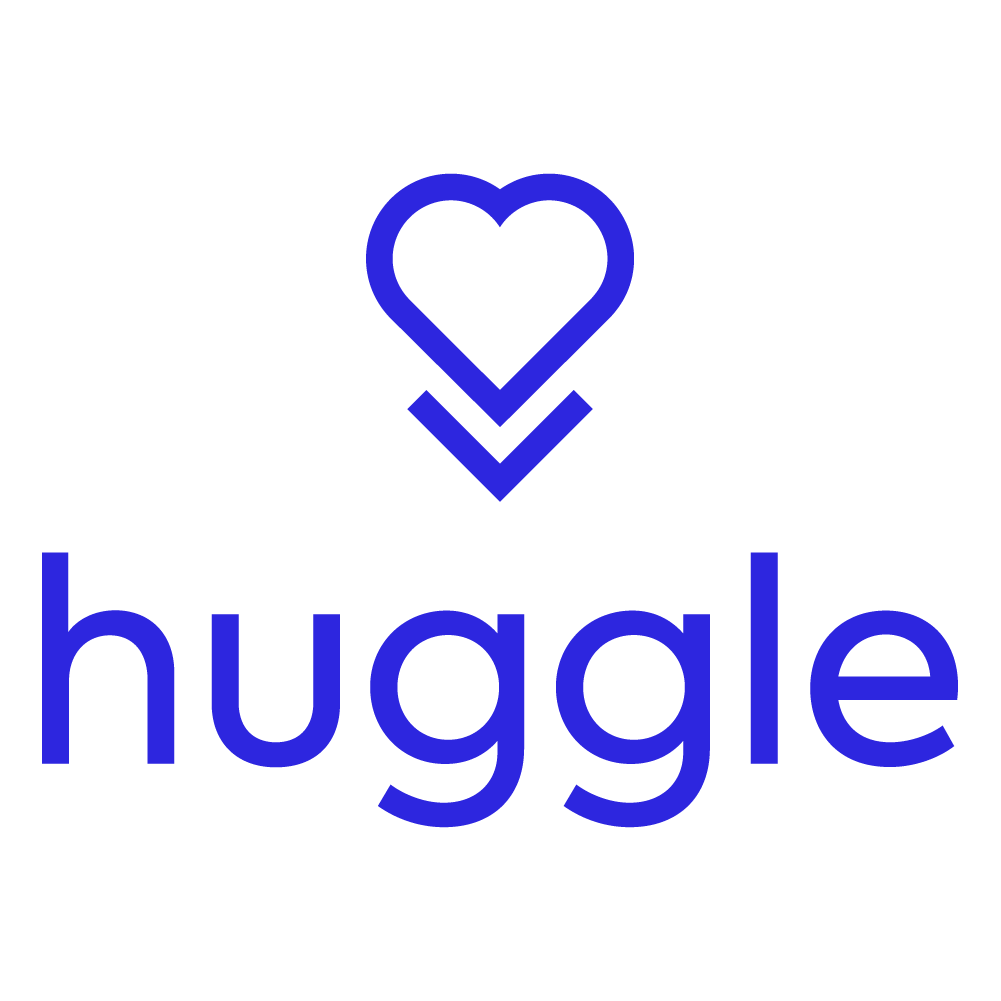
- Huggle App logo
- Developer: Huggle App Limited
- Release: March 2015
- Operating system: Apple iOS (iOS 8.0 or later), Android
- Type: Social Networking
- Website: huggle.com

Huggle was a location-based social application which connected users based on commonality of places they frequent. The app was developed through a partnership with entrepreneur Andrey Andreev.

Following a soft launch in 2015, it was officially launched in July 2016. It was acquired by Badoo (now a brand of Bumble Inc.) in 2018. In 2020, the platform was shut down.

== History ==
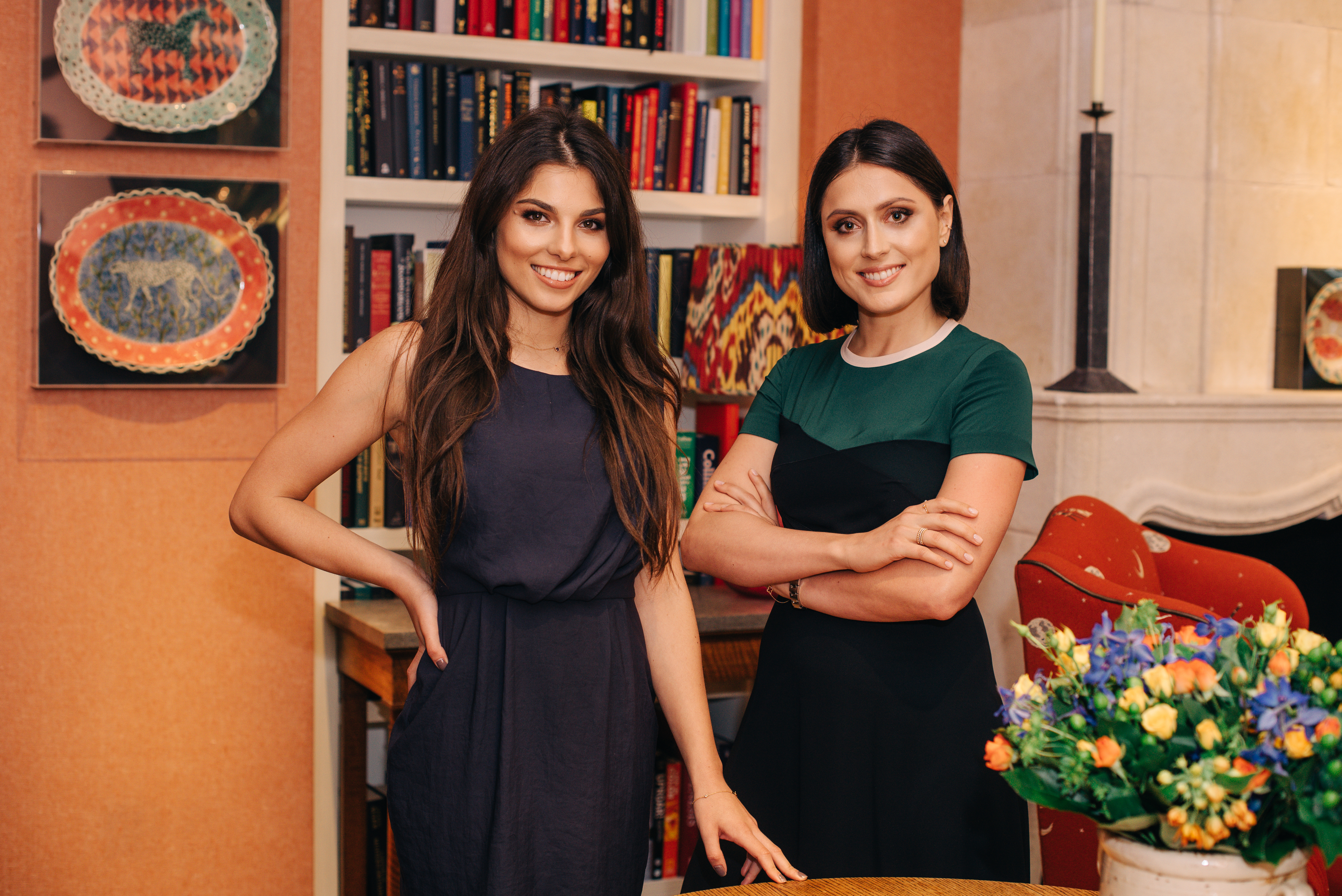
Founders Stina Sanders (left) and Valerie Stark (right)

Founders Stina Sanders and Valerie Stark met after Stark moved from Moscow to London and was using Instagram geolocation data to try and meet people who hung out at the same places she did. They decided to create an app inspired by how they met. Sanders and Stark took the idea to Andrey Andreev, the tech entrepreneur that backed Bumble and founded Badoo.

The app took six months to build and had a soft launch in 2015. Huggle officially launched in July 2016 and was available globally the following October. Upon its release, it was available for iOS, Android, and Windows Phone.

An updated version was released June 2017. By September 2017, over 45 million locations had been logged on the app.

In February 2018, Huggle turned off its dating mode for 24 hours to combat the pressure to find a date for Valentine's Day.

In March 2018, it was announced that Badoo had acquired Huggle as a subsidiary. After the acquisition, Stark announced she would be stepping down as CEO, while Sanders stayed on with Badoo to lead the Huggle team.

In January 2020, Bumble decided they would no longer actively maintain or market several of their subsidiary platforms, including Huggle.

== Operation ==
Huggle connects users through locations, using GPS to automatically check-in. Only when someone else has checked into the same place can a user see their profile. For security purposes, users can only view the places they have in common.

The app was originally designed to make friends by connecting with people with mutual interests. However, a dating element was added in response to users looking for romantic matches.

To verify a profile, users must take multiple selfies approved by a team of moderators. The actual profile is generated with information from other social media sites, including Facebook, Foursquare, and Instagram. The user chooses whether they are looking for a date or a friend as well as ideal age range and how many places their matches must have in contact before they can contact the user.

When two users check in to the same place, they can view each other's profiles. The app automatically checks a user in at any locations they visit and adds the location to their list of places. Users can then match with other people who visit that location. Huggle includes a "visitors" feature, that allows users to see people who view their profile.

== See also ==
- Comparison of online dating services
