= Mary Neely =

American actress and director

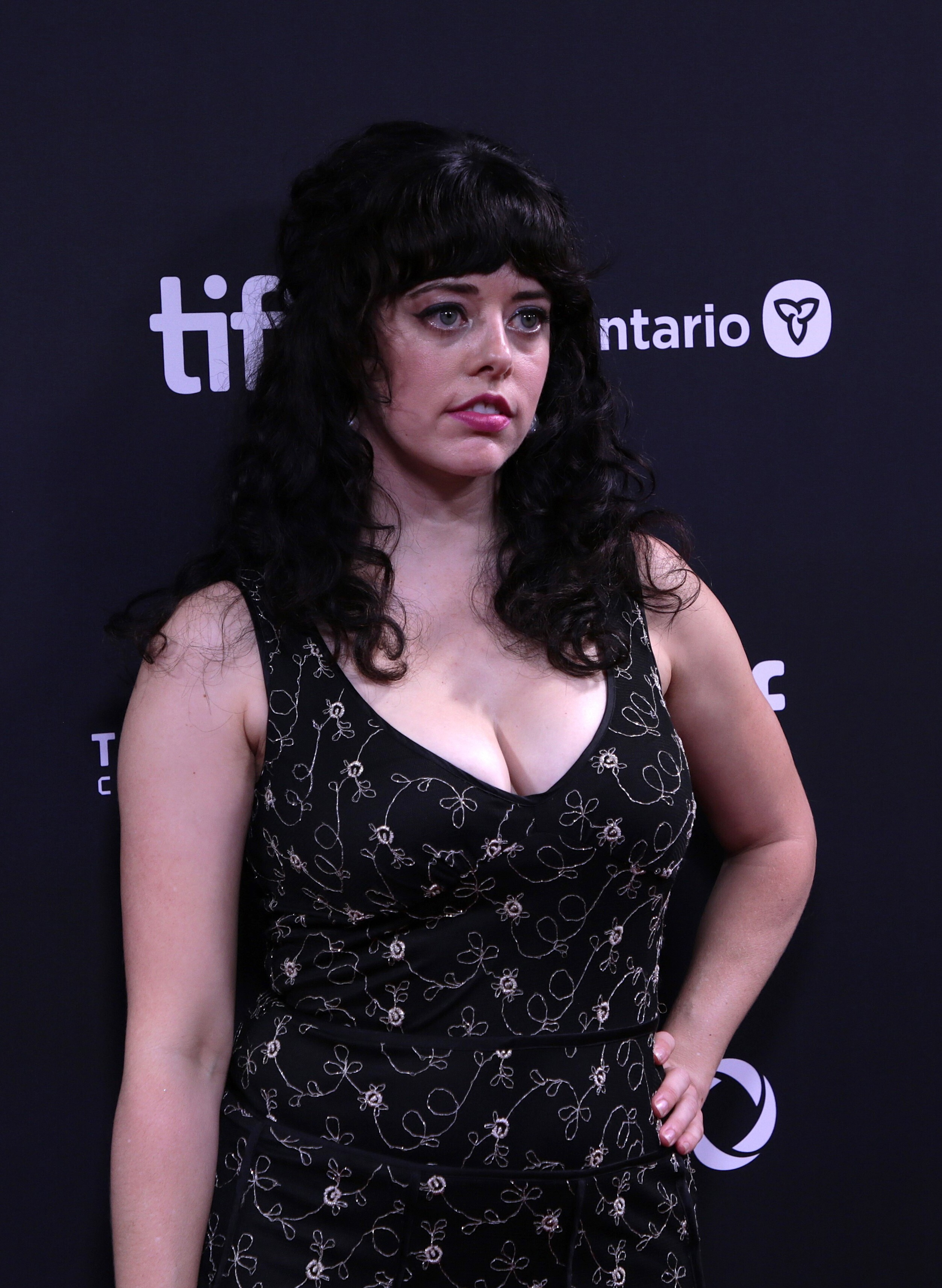
- Neely in 2025 at the Toronto International Film Festival
- Born: April 10, 1991 (age 35); Los Angeles, California
- Education: UCLA School of Theater, Film, and Television
- Occupations: Actress; Writer; Director; Editor
- Years active: 2012–present

Mary Connor Neely (born April 10, 1991) is an American actress, writer, director, and editor. She rose to prominence during the 2020 coronavirus pandemic with a series of self-filmed lip-sync videos reenacting scenes from well-known musicals. She published her videos on Twitter to broad acclaim. Neely has also appeared in 20th Century Studios' Swiped, based on the life of Bumble founder and CEO Whitney Wolfe Herd and along with 'SubwayTakes' creator Kareem Rahma, Neely co-wrote and co-stars in the independent film Or Something.

== Early life ==
Mary Connor Neely was born on April 10, 1991, in Los Angeles, California, to Mark Neely, an actor, and Polly Neely (née Johnson), a commercial production coordinator. Her parents divorced when she was young and she was raised equally between them.

Growing up in Los Angeles, Neely has described it as both “really interesting” and “odd”.

"My dad was a taxi driver in LA in the 70s, so growing up he would drive me around, he knew the city like the back of his hand. He would tell me stories from when he was a cab driver and it colored the city for me.”

— Mary Neely, "i-D" (August 2018)

Though both of her parents exited entertainment when Neely was in elementary school, a lot of their friends were “crew people” which led Neely to grow up in the industry but as she described, “it wasn’t glamorous.”

Neely started acting in community theater productions at age eight, saying her love for musicals was akin to a religion. Neely graduated from The Archer School for Girls in 2009 before studying acting at UCLA's School of Theater Film and Television on scholarship.

== Career ==
=== Beginnings (2012–2020) ===
During her junior year at UCLA, Neely was scouted by a commercial casting director at a barbecue and began auditioning while still enrolled in school. That same year Neely was cast as "Kitty" in Eli Russell Linnetz' Afterglow, a short film also starring Sawyer Spielberg and Paul Sand. She graduated from UCLA in 2013 with a major in Theater and a minor in Scandinavian culture.

Neely has been cast in over twenty national commercials, most notably as goth daughter Debbie in Pepcid's The Burns Family campaign alongside Richard Riehle and as the bubbly Tide Pods Waitress, which ran in the U.S. and Canada from 2015 to 2019. Frustrated by the lack of depth written into female TV and film roles, Neely began creating her own projects, learning how to edit using YouTube tutorials. Neely's first short film, The Dresser, was nominated for the Golden Egg award at the 2014 Reykjavík International Film Festival. A comedy about Sofia, a young actress grappling with her control issues by trying and failing to hook up with a co-star, Neely wrote, directed, edited, produced, and starred.

She then made Wacko Smacko, an eight-episode web series based on The Dresser that follows Sofia as she fumbles through ordeals with dating, friendships, and family while trying to develop an acting career in Los Angeles. Neely again wrote, directed, produced, and starred. In 2016 the series was licensed to the YouTube channel Snarled and was well-received, with over 500,000 views.

After the success of Wacko Smacko, Neely caught the attention of an independent producing team who hired her to direct and edit Pink Trailer, a short film that follows two young women, Julie and Lucy, as they housesit for Lucy's grandmother but keep getting visited by a foreboding neighbor. Neely blended comedy with hints of horror to accentuate serious discussions about mental health and growing up. The film premiered at the 2018 South by Southwest film festival and opened Palm Springs ShortFest to positive reviews, Refinery29 comparing it to Greta Gerwig's Lady Bird. In 2019 Pink Trailer played as a pre-feature short before Olivia Wilde's Booksmart at the Oriental Theater in Milwaukee.

In 2018 Neely directed and edited her first music video, Margaret, for indie rock band Pinky Pinky (now known as Tchotchke). Deemed a “masterpiece” by Paper Magazine, the video stars Teresa Ganzel as a lonely, pill-popping, Chardonnay-drinking mother of a teenage girl. Neely described it as a "dark version" of the 2003 Fountains of Wayne music video for Stacy's Mom.

==== Coronavirus Lockdown Project (2020) ====
During the initial lockdown of the coronavirus pandemic in March 2020, Neely, isolated and living alone, decided to record herself on an iPhone, reenacting love duets from classic musicals like Les Misérables, Phantom of the Opera, Grease, Hamilton, among others. Doing so involved her lip-syncing both male and female parts on-camera, wearing a variety of wigs and costumes as well as editing each video.

"All those years of singing every role in every musical alone in my childhood bedroom suddenly felt like training for this moment, because I wasn’t just alone in my bedroom—everyone was.”

— Mary Neely, Backstage (August 2020)

Her efforts resulted in media attention, performance offers, and widespread praise, including compliments from broadcast TV showrunners Krista Vernoff, Warren Leight and Mike Schur plus Broadway luminaries Lin-Manuel Miranda and Andrew Lloyd Webber.

The last in Neely's video series was Belle, the opening number from Disney's Beauty and the Beast. Neely plays over 40 characters and choreographed the number in and around her apartment building . The finale gained one million views on Twitter in six days, Nerdist writing, "The song begins, and so does the beautiful chaos that is her-self proclaimed 'magnum opus.' It’s magic". After wrapping up the initial thread of love song covers in April, Neely came back in May with a full song-by-song reenactment of The Sound of Music to raise money for Broadway Cares/Equity Fights AIDS. After meeting her $7,000 fundraising goal in one hour, Neely managed to raise $25,000 for theater performers seeking COVID relief.

The New York Times and The Washington Post included Neely's quarantine created videos in their Best Theater of 2020 roundups, the former claiming, "For a few heroic weeks, she was a one-woman incarnation of musical theater itself".

Also in 2020 Neely appeared in MGM's remake of Valley Girl, was chosen as one of Adweek's Creative 100 and named a New Face at the Just for Laughs Comedy Festival in Montreal.

=== Post Pandemic (2021–2025) ===
Neely was cast in supporting roles in Sony's live-action/animated musical fantasy comedy film Lyle Lyle Crocodile and Netflix's romantic comedy film Happiness for Beginners, in 2022 and 2023 respectively. Neely was offered a guest star role in a 2022 Law & Order: Special Victims Unit episode by showrunner Warren Leight, who had discovered Neely during the making of her COVID musical videos on Twitter.

In 2023 Neely was cast in the remake of The Room starring Bob Odenkirk and in 2024 Neely was cast in the 20th Century Studios feature Swiped starring Lily James, the latter of which premiered at the 2025 Toronto International Film Festival ahead of its September 2025 Hulu release.

==== Or Something (Film) ====
A few months after moving to New York City in 2021, Neely met Kareem Rahma at a rooftop comedy show in Brooklyn. The pair immediately started debating various topics, such as dating and male/female relationships. A few weeks later Rahma posted a story to his Instagram asking to be cast in a "serious" role in a movie, in the vein of French classic La Haine. Neely responded, "I'll cast you" and the pair decided to make a feature film together, spending the rest of 2021 and most of 2022 meeting up to work out the script. Or Something was shot in 6 days on a microbudget around Brooklyn and Manhattan with no permits at the end of 2022. Deemed a "conversational odyssey," the film stars Neely and Rahma as two strangers who show up to the same Brooklyn apartment looking to collect cash they are both owed before being forced to spend the day together. The film also stars David Zayas and Brandon Wardell in supporting roles. Pete Ohs signed on to edit the film in 2023 and in 2024 Or Something had its world premiere at The Downtown Festival. The screening at Roxy Cinema in Tribeca was followed by a conversation with Jeremy O. Harris.

In 2025 Or Something was acquired by Factory 25 before premiering theatrically at Quad Cinema in Manhattan with additional screenings at Brain Dead Studios in Los Angeles and the TIFF Lightbox Theater in Toronto. Critics have said the dialogue heavy film is similar to an East Coast version of a Duplass Brothers Mumblecore movie and praise Neely and Rahma's chemistry. Or Something became available to stream on Mubi New Year's Eve 2025.

=== Broadway (2026) ===
In February of 2026 it was announced that Neely joined the cast of the Broadway revival of Arthur Miller's Pulitzer winning drama Death of a Salesman starring Nathan Lane, Laurie Metcalf, Christopher Abbott and Ben Ahlers directed by Joe Mantello. The acclaimed revival won four Drama Desk Awards, four Outer Critics Circle Awards, and six Tony Awards, including 'Best Revival of a Play.' After 36 previews and 129 performances at The Winter Garden Theater Death of a Salesman closed on August 9th, 2026.

== Personal life ==
Neely lives in New York City.

== Filmography ==
=== Film ===
Year	Title	Credited as				Ref
Year	Title	Actor	Writer	Director	Editor	Ref
2012	Afterglow (short)	Yes	No	No	No	
2014	The Dresser (short)	Yes	Yes	Yes	Yes	
2017	Pink Trailer (short)	No	No	Yes	Yes	
2020	ASMR (short)	Yes	No	No	No	
2020	Valley Girl	Yes	No	No	No	
2022	Lyle Lyle Crocodile	Yes	No	No	No	
2023	Happiness for Beginners	Yes	No	No	No	
2024	Or Something	Yes	Yes	No	No	
2025	Swiped	Yes	No	No	No	
2025	The Room (Remake)	Yes	No	No	No	

=== Television ===
Year	Title	Credited as				Notes	Ref
Year	Title	Actor	Writer	Director	Editor	Notes	Ref
2018	The Good Cop	Yes	No	No	No	Episode: "Did the TV Star Do it?"	
2022	Law & Order: Special Victims Unit	Yes	No	No	No	Episode: "Did You Believe in Miracles?"	

=== Web ===
Year	Title	Credited as				Notes	Ref
Year	Title	Actor	Writer	Director	Editor	Notes	Ref
2015	Wacko Smacko	Yes	Yes	Yes	Yes	8 episodes	
2016	Welcome to the Shadow Zone	Yes	No	No	No	5 episodes	

=== Music Videos ===
Year	Title	Credited as			Ref
Year	Title	Actor	Director	Editor	Ref
2018	"Margaret" by Pinky Pinky	No	Yes	Yes	
2025	"One Night Stand" by Chéri Chéri	No	Yes	Yes	

== Theater ==
Year	Title	Role	Venue	Ref
2026	Death of a Salesman	Letta	Winter Garden, Broadway	

== Awards and nominations ==
Year	Award	Category	Nominated work	Result
2014	Reykjavik International Film Festival Golden Egg Award	Best Short	The Dresser	Nominated
2018	South by Southwest Film Festival Grand Jury Award	Narrative Short	Pink Trailer	Nominated
2026	New York Drama Critics' Circle Award	Best Ensemble Performance	Death of a Salesman	Won
