= Swiped (2025 film) =

- Release poster
- Directed by: Rachel Lee Goldenberg
- Written by: Rachel Lee Goldenberg; Bill Parker; Kim Caramele
- Produced by: Lily James; Jennifer Gibgot; Andrew Panay
- Starring: Lily James; Dan Stevens; Myha'la; Jackson White
- Cinematography: Doug Emmett
- Edited by: Julia Wong
- Music by: Chanda Dancy
- Production companies: 20th Century Studios; Ethea Entertainment
- Distributed by: Hulu
- Release dates: September 9, 2025 (TIFF); September 19, 2025 (Hulu)
- Running time: 110 minutes
- Country: United States
- Language: English

Swiped is a 2025 American biographical film starring Lily James as Whitney Wolfe Herd, founder and CEO of the dating app Bumble. The film also stars Dan Stevens, Myha'la and Jackson White. It is directed by Rachel Lee Goldenberg and distributed by Hulu.

The film had its world premiere at the Toronto International Film Festival on September 9, 2025, and was released in the United States on Hulu and internationally on Disney+ on September 19, 2025. The film received mixed reviews.

== Plot ==
Whitney Wolfe, a young woman from Salt Lake City who had just graduated from Southern Methodist University, is energetic, ambitious, and highly driven. She had previously founded a nonprofit organization that sold bamboo tote bags to support communities affected by the BP oil spill. At a technology conference, Whitney tries to connect with tech practitioners and entrepreneurs, but her efforts are dismissed and she is largely overlooked. As she is leaving, she met Sean Rad, a co-founder of a tech startup that focus on building online applications. Sean invites her to visit his company, Hatch Labs, anytime, and Whitney comes to the office the very next day.

Sean brings Whitney to meet potential investors to secure funding for Cardify, an application the company is developing. Whitney successfully convinces investors who are initially skeptical, which impresses Sean and leads him to hire her as the company’s marketing director. During internal meetings, employees show more excitement toward a new online dating app than toward the company’s main product, Cardify. Sean feels that the name "Matchbox" lacks appeal, and Whitney suggests the name "Tinder," which Sean approves. To better understand the product, Whitney conducts research by using Tinder herself and going on dates with several men. At one point, one of the company’s co-founders, Justin, appears. Mutual attraction causes Whitney and Justin to grow close and begin a relationship. Justin later introduces the swipe feature to the Tinder app. Whitney experiments with launching Tinder at her former campus, SMU, starting with fraternity and sorority networks, where students respond enthusiastically. Due to her strong performance, Sean appoints Whitney as one of the company’s co-founders. Tinder rapidly gains popularity, and its user base grows quickly, earning the title of Best New Startup in 2013. As the number of users increases, several female employees notice inappropriate behavior from male users, including the sending of unsolicited explicit images to women. Whitney raises this issue during a company meeting, but the male co-founders do not consider it a serious problem.

Whitney begins to feel uncomfortable with Justin, whom she believes often takes credit for her ideas and holds very different values. She decides to end the relationship, but Justin accuses her of sleeping with her superiors to advance her career and blames her for making all his past relationships toxic. He frequently sends abusive messages to Whitney, which affects her work performance. Whitney reports this behavior to Sean, who advises Justin, but this only worsens Justin’s attitude toward her. When Tinder reaches one million users, Sean hosts a celebration party. At the event, Andrey Andreev, founder of the world’s largest dating app, Badoo, offers Whitney a position as Chief Marketing Officer at his company. Whitney rejects the offer because she believes Tinder represents her true passion. However, Justin’s continued pressure and the way other male employees begin to view her as a cheap prostitute become unbearable. When Whitney raises the issue again with Sean, he interprets it as her resignation and removes her from the company.

After leaving the company, Whitney is unable to speak publicly due to a non-disclosure agreement. She experiences severe depression as she faces negative comments and online harassment. Even her closest friend, Tisha, views her as overly selfish. At her lowest point, Whitney begins developing the concept of a kindness-based application and contacts Andrey. Andrey agrees to meet her, and when Whitney presents the idea of a dating app designed to empower women, he immediately supports it and appoints her as founder and CEO of a new company. Whitney later apologizes to Tisha and invites her to join the company. Tisha also brings Beth, who feels uncomfortable in her current job. Together, the three women create an online dating app called Bumble. While relaxing at a bar, Whitney meets a man named Michael, who accepts her past without judgment, and they begin a relationship. Within a few years, Bumble reaches tens of millions of users and survives multiple lawsuits from Tinder. One day, Forbes journalist Marta Medina informs Whitney about an investigation into alleged sexual misconduct, drug use, misogyny, and corruption involving Andrey. During a televised talk show, Whitney states that she condemns all forms of workplace violence and abuse at Badoo.

In 2019, Andrey sells his ownership stake in the company to Blackstone Investment Group. Later, Matthew Slate from Blackstone offers Whitney the position of CEO of Magic Lab, overseeing both Badoo and Bumble, making her the youngest woman to lead a publicly traded company. Whitney also actively advocates for the passage of Texas House Bill 2789, which defines the sending of unsolicited explicit images as a criminal offense.

== Cast ==
- Lily James as Whitney Wolfe, co-founder of Tinder and Founder of Bumble
- Dan Stevens as Andrey Andreev
- Myha'la as Tisha
- Jackson White as Justin Mateen, co-founder of Tinder
- Ben Schnetzer as Sean Rad, co-founder of Tinder
- Pierson Fodé as Michael Herd
- Ian Colletti as JB
- Mary Neely as Beth
- Ana Yi Puig as Stephanie
- Aidan Laprete as Adam
- Pedro Correa as Diego
- Coral Peña as Marta
- Joely Fisher as Sima
- Dan Bakkedahl as Ed
- Ciara Bravo as Carly
- Clea DuVall as Charlotte
- Christopher McDonald as Robert
- Dermot Mulroney as Matthew Slate
- Denny Love as Hoodie Guy
- Lennon Parham as Tour Guide

== Production ==
In March 2024, it was announced that a biographical drama film based on the life of Whitney Wolfe Herd, founder and former CEO of Bumble, was in development at 20th Century Studios. Rachel Lee Goldenberg had been hired to direct and co-write the screenplay, with Lily James cast in the lead role as Herd. In April, Myha'la and Jackson White joined the cast in undisclosed roles. In May, Dan Stevens and Ben Schnetzer joined the cast. In June, Pierson Fodé, Ian Colletti, Mary Neely, Ana Yi Puig, Aidan Laprete, Pedro Correa, and Coral Peña joined the cast. Principal photography began on May 15, 2024, in Los Angeles, and wrapped on July 9. Doug Emmett served as the cinematographer, and Julia Wong edited the film.

In September 2025, during an interview with CNBC, Wolfe Herd stated that she was not informed a film would be made of her life and career and was not involved in nor approved of its production, which she admitted she attempted to halt after she learned of its existence.

=== Music ===
By July 2025, Chanda Dancy had composed the score for the film.

== Release ==
Swiped had its world premiere in the Gala Presentations section of the 2025 Toronto International Film Festival on September 9, 2025. The film was released in the United States on Hulu by 20th Century Studios on September 19, 2025.

== Critical response ==
On the review aggregator website Rotten Tomatoes, 44% of 77 critics' reviews are positive, with an average rating of 5.3/10. The website's consensus reads: "Glossy to a fault, Swiped packages its true events as a rote reenactment instead of delivering the feminist story it could have been." Metacritic, which uses a weighted average, assigned the film a score of 42 out of 100, based on 14 critics, indicating "mixed or average" reviews.

Caroline Siede of The A.V. Club gave the film a B grade, writing, "Swiped's standard rise-and-fall structure suggests that even things that start out good can become corrupted over time. Yet in choosing to pause its story in 2019, before the myth of the girlboss truly crumbled in the 2020s, it ends on its simplest note. The decision makes Swiped a breezy, empowering watch—at least for those who find the idea of becoming a 'self-made billionaire' empowering. But the real revolution would be letting the subjects of female tech biopics remain as messy as the men." The Mary Sue's Rachel Leishman said the film "isn't a perfect biopic and it isn't one of the more serious attempts at telling these stories but it is a fun and interesting look into how Bumble came to be."

Clarisse Loughrey of The Independent was more critical, giving the film 2/5 stars. She wrote, "There's a deliberate unseriousness to Swiped, from Dan Stevens's vaguely absurd Russian accent and indie boy fringe as Andreev, to the depiction of 2010s culture as all playground slides in the office and black tights with sneakers." Kevin Maher of The Times also gave it 2/5 stars, writing, "Moments like these, smartly sold by James in charismatic form, would be catnip for subversive film-makers such as Emerald Fennell or Greta Gerwig. But the director and co-writer Rachel Lee Goldenberg (Unpregnant) never fully attacks and instead shifts skittishly between a Devil Wears Prada-style you-go-girl success story and the tougher darker film that occasionally emerges." John Lui of The Straits Times also gave it 2/5 stars, saying, "[Whitney Wolfe Herd] is alive, rich and armed with lawyers, so this portrait is devoid of juice. There is almost nothing here about her psychological make-up, which tends to be the most interesting thing about studies of self-made millionaires."
