= Valerie Stark =

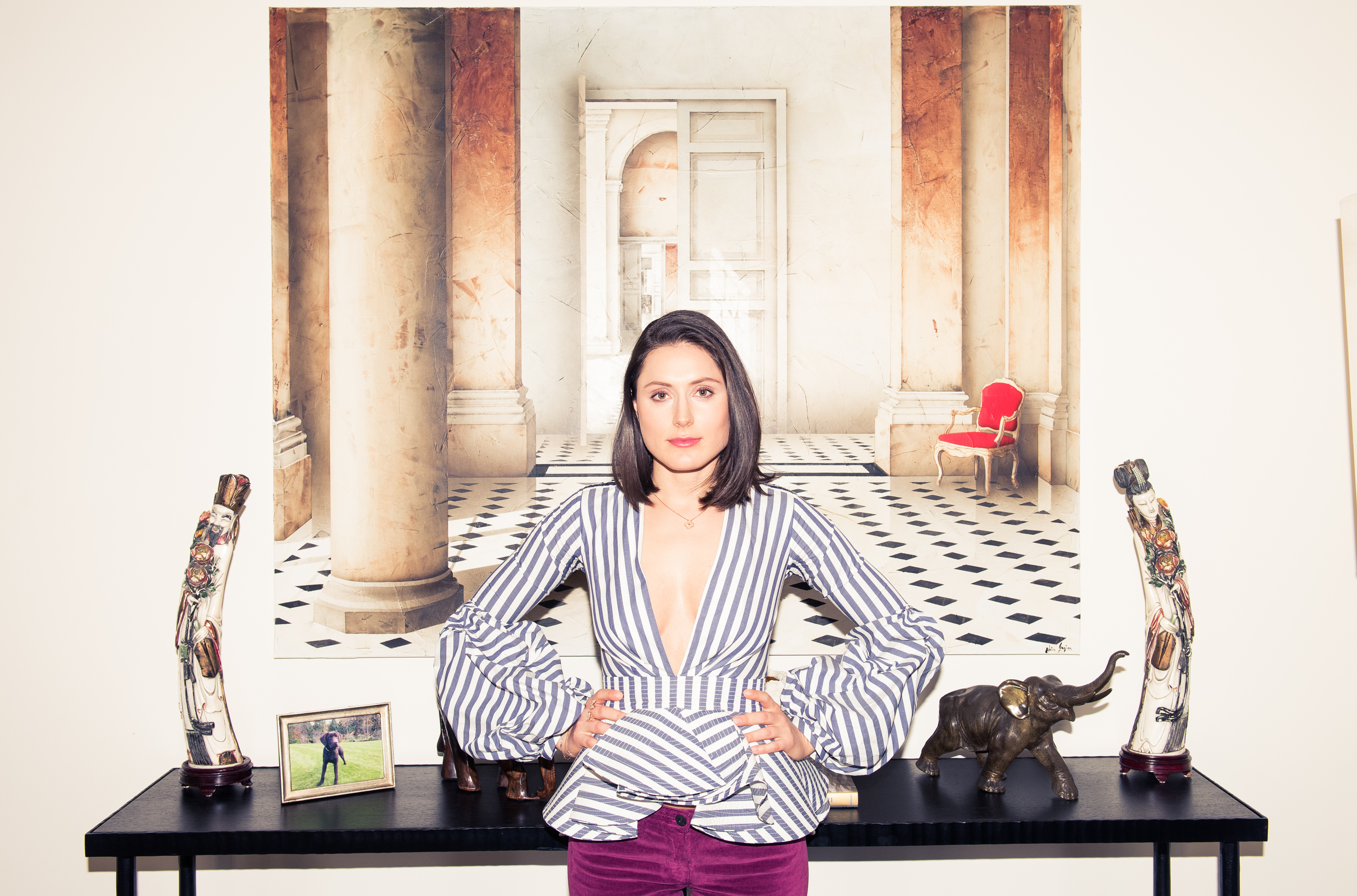
- Born: 1986 (age 39–40); Moscow, Russia
- Occupation: Entrepreneur
- Known for: CEO, Co-founder of Huggle

Valerie Stark (born 1986) is an entrepreneur and businesswoman. She is the co-founder and CEO of the mobile app Huggle. Stark is also a board member of Bumble and an advisor to Badoo.

== Early life ==
Stark was born and raised in Moscow, Russia. At the age of 15, she began working as a secretary for a technology company. Stark studied interior design and paid for the education herself.

== Career ==
Prior to founding Huggle, Stark blogged about gardening and worked in a managerial position for one of the largest restaurant business in Moscow where she was known for her role in the company's European and UK expansion. After moving to London from Moscow, she found it hard to make friends and began using her familiarity with Instagram's geolocation feature to find people with common interests. She met Stina Sanders using this technique and the two women eventually founded Huggle based around Stark's idea of connecting people who visit the same locations. Stark is considered a feminist entrepreneur. In 2018, she was named one of the Top 30 Female Entrepreneurs in the UK to Watch in 2018 by About Time magazine.
