= Happiness for Beginners =

2023 film by Vicky Wight

- Poster
- Directed by: Vicky Wight
- Screenplay by: Vicky Wight
- Based on: Happiness for Beginners by Katherine Center
- Produced by: Geoff Linville; Vicky Wight; Barry Meyerowitz
- Starring: Ellie Kemper; Luke Grimes
- Cinematography: Daniel Vecchione
- Edited by: Suzanne Spangler
- Music by: Sherri Chung
- Production companies: Quiver Distribution; Cranetown Media
- Distributed by: Netflix
- Release date: July 27, 2023
- Running time: 103 minutes
- Country: United States
- Language: English

Happiness for Beginners is a 2023 American romantic comedy film starring Ellie Kemper and Luke Grimes, an adaptation of the Katherine Center 2015 novel of the same name. The novel was adapted for the screen and directed by Vicky Wight.

Following a divorce, Helen books an Appalachian Trail survivalist course where she is surprised to find Jake, her younger brother's best friend, who gradually grows on her.

The film was released by Netflix on July 27, 2023.

== Plot ==
Divorcée Helen books a beginners' Appalachian Trail survivalist course. While seeking her brother Duncan to give him keys to housesit, she sees her brother's friend Jake. Helen's ex Mike calls, reminding her their sixth wedding anniversary would have been today, so she has a flashback. Both Jake and Duncan were at the wedding, disapproving of the clumsy Mike.

Helen pops in to see Gigi, the grandmother who had raised them, on her drive from Pittsburgh. Staying in the designated Connecticut motel, the next morning the young hiking guide Beckett gives them their trip orientation. Introducing themselves, 40+ Helen discovers she is one of the eldest participants, which fellow older hiker Hugh happily notes. Then she is shocked to see Jake.

Confronting Jake afterward, as he refuses to leave, Helen suggests they not interact and keep their connection quiet. Shortly after the bus drops the group off at the 50+ mile hike's starting point, Helen immediately gashes her leg. Jake, a doctor the designated EMT, dresses her wound and congratulates her on her divorce.

Soon after, Helen gets scolded for stepping on a log, one of many rules they should have memorised. They learn how to put up a bear hang to protect them and their food. Helen's tentmate Windy is 'crushing on' Jake, but Helen only sees him as immature.

The next morning, Helen asks Jake for help with blisters as she forgot to bring the right footwear and did not prevent them. Beckett chews her out. But also partially blames Mason, the Wall Street hiker, for not being a team player by pushing everyone.

Windy tries to promote positive thinking. Everyone gets to know each other, Hugh sharing that he had been an aspiring actor but now sells insurance. When they are next alone, Helen confronts Jake about his staring and hovering. He says he simply fears her returning to Mike, as he is not good enough for her.

After hiking for ten days, Beckett has them rehike a route, grouped according to speed. He insists Mason go with the slower hikers to promote team-building. Before leaving, Beckett has a fit when he finds Helen's personal goal list, which she had accidentally dropped. No one claims it, but Jake quietly shows he knows, then hands her something to read later.

In Helen's hiking group, they gossip about Jake and Windy, suggesting chemistry, as a quick kiss is mentioned. While everyone else is checking the map, Hugh foolishly plays balance beam on a rotten log, breaking his leg, as Mason freezes. Helen goes for help.

Helen catches up with the lead group after nightfall, so they decide to go find them at dawn. Sharing a tent with Jake, she tells him about her middle brother Nathan. He drowned when Helen was six, which she felt responsible for. The family unraveled, as their dad, then their mother, left them. They both act jealous: Jake over her accepting Mike's constant messages and Helen over his kiss with Windy, although it was during a game of Truth or Dare.

Early in the morning, they carry Hugh on a makeshift stretcher to a waiting ambulance three miles away. The next day, they all relax and chat and when dusk falls, Helen seeks out Jake, who is absent. Grateful, he hugs her then explains he inherited a degenerative eye disease, so is gradually going blind. It affects him mostly at night and is why he could not find his dropped glasses, and also why he had stopped practicing medicine. They nearly kiss but are interrupted.

The next day, back at the motel, karaoke and other farewell activities are planned, but Helen ducks out after overhearing Jake has someone at home. Driving to Gigi's, she can only think of him. Finally reading the Pablo Neruda poem he had given her, she realises he has feelings for her. Gigi believes the trip has changed her and she might be in love.

When Duncan comes over, Helen apologizes and vows to be a better sister. He insists she go out with him and Gigi to celebrate a birthday. Jake shows up and they finally kiss, after he confesses he has loved her for years. The movie ends with a montage of Beckett repeatedly addressing many new groups of hikers, his great happiness.

== Cast ==
- Ellie Kemper as Helen
- Luke Grimes as Jake
- Nico Santos as Hugh
- Blythe Danner as Gigi
- Ben Cook as Beckett
- Shayvawn Webster as Windy
- Julia Shiplett as Sue
- Gus Birney as Kaylee
- Esteban Benito as Mason
- Alexander Koch as Duncan
- Mary Neely as Lulu

== Production ==
The film is directed by Vicky Wight from the 2015 Katherine Center novel, with the project announced in October 2021. Wight has a co-writing credit with Center on the project and previously directed an adaptation of another Center novel, The Lost Husband (2020). Center has an executive producer credit on the film, along with Jeff Sackman and Larry Greenberg while Wight also produces, with Geoff Linville and Berry Meyerowitz.

Kemper said she was drawn to the role due to the nuance in the character of Helen. She told Entertainment Weekly, “Helen is a grump. It felt like that would be fun to play because it is so different from the optimistic, funny, bright-eyed women that I've played in the past."

== Release ==
Happiness for Beginners premiered on Netflix July 27, 2023.

== Reception ==
On the review aggregator website Rotten Tomatoes, 33% of 27 critics' reviews are positive, with an average rating of 4.9/10. The website's consensus reads: "A bland journey of self-discovery that's too inoffensive to stand out in a crowded genre, this romantic dramedy offers little Happiness for Beginners—or viewers at any other level." Metacritic, which uses a weighted average, assigned the film a score of 48 out of 100, based on 11 critics, indicating "mixed or average" reviews.
