= Swag gap =

Social dynamic

The swag gap is a term describing a discrepancy in style between two individuals in a relationship. The term was popularized online in 2025 on social media platforms like TikTok primarily by "swag gap 'survivors'" in Generation Z. While it originally started as a "lighthearted meme," it soon "sparked real conversations about self-image, attraction and the idea of power in relationships" according to Psychology Today.

Frequently noted examples include celebrity couples like Justin Bieber and Hailey Bieber, as well as Benny Blanco and Selena Gomez.

== History ==
According to Yahoo Life, Cosmopolitan, and other publications, the term became popularized by a video from user "itsalmondmilkhunni" who posted a video in April 2025 describing her reasons for not wanting to be in a swag gap relationship:

Have me showing up somewhere in public, looking swagged out, looking fly. I have a cool outfit, and then my partner just looks like an effing mess behind me. They just are wearing something that looks crazy. And it's not just clothes too. It's an aura and an energy.

Jess Carbino, who formerly served as a sociologist for Tinder and Bumble, said that the swag gap was "nothing new" but rather a phenomenon with "a modern, Gen-Zified name" brought upon by modern desires to create new phrases to describe "certain social dynamics." The Independent found its popularity tied to the current age of "intense comparison, encouraged by gloat-heavy social media platforms like Instagram (for holidays, babies, engagements and home ownership) and LinkedIn (for shiny new job announcements and mega-promotions."

== Definition ==
GQ stated that the swag gap "refers to a couple in which one half is a lot more stylish—or just generally more charismatic or cool—than the other." Dazed defined the swag gap as "an imbalance in dress, yes, but also a perceived imbalance in coolness" and identified it as one of many modern discourses regarding discrepancies in relationships—whether by age, intelligence, frequency of partying, and so on—and whether opposites attract. Cosmopolitan included "vibes" in its definition of swag gap.

Some users on TikTok, as reported by BBC, saw the swag gap not merely as a discrepancy in how much one cares about style, but also about the very style themselves, thus implicating couples who were simply mismatched or "don't see-eye-to-eye in terms of aesthetic, clothing and maybe lifestyle" even if they both care equally about style.

== Criticisms ==
In The Wall Street Journal, the swag gap was defined not as a mere superficial consideration of style but rather as a question of self-confidence, in which case an imbalance of self-worth in a relationship could lead to threatening insecurities. The Week added that, according to a 2021 study, "self-esteem and sensitivity to relationship conflict are negatively correlated" and could thus affect "personal confidence and the overall emotional health of the relationship."

Psychology Today saw the swag gap as a means in which a relationship could be ruined for three reasons: eroding the less swaggy partner's self-esteem, introducing a power dynamic, and making the more swaggy partner look for romantic alternatives. Cosmopolitan opined that the problem with being in a swag gap relationship is that "You may think you're in control—you may think the loser you're dating is a harmless loser. But the truth is, eventually their lack of swag will inevitably rub off on you."

South China Morning Post, The Washington Post, and other publications argued that the swag gap was not merely an aesthetic imbalance but an imbalance of respect from the less swaggy partner to the other.
