= Bumble Inc. =

American internet dating technology company

- Type: Public
- Traded as: Nasdaq: BMBL
- Industry: Online dating
- Founded: 2014; 12 years ago
- Founder: Whitney Wolfe Herd
- Headquarters: Austin, Texas, United States
- Area served: Global
- Key people: Whitney Wolfe Herd (CEO); Ann Mather (chair)
- Brands: Badoo, Bumble
- Revenue: ▼US$965 million (2025)
- Operating income: ▼US$−805 million (2025)
- Net income: ▼US$−895 million (2025)
- Total assets: ▼US$1.425 billion (2025)
- Total equity: ▼US$569 million (2025)
- Owner: Blackstone Inc. (22.9% economic; 48.9% voting); Whitney Wolfe Herd (14.0% economic; 34.8% voting)
- Number of employees: 580 (2025)
- Website: bumble.com

Bumble Inc., headquartered in Austin, Texas, is a holding company that owns Bumble, Badoo, and BFF, all of which are online dating and social networking apps.

== History ==
The company was founded as MagicLab by Andrey Andreev and launched Badoo in 2006.

In 2014, Whitney Wolfe Herd founded Bumble shortly after leaving Tinder, where she was a co-founder and VP of Marketing. Badoo co-founder and CEO Andrey Andreev encouraged her to start a new dating app and brought her on as a partner in MagicLab. Andreev retained 79% ownership in the company for an investment of $10 million, along with additional investments, consulting services, and use of Badoo's infrastructure; Wolfe Herd served as CEO and received a 20% ownership stake.

The Bumble app was launched in December 2014.

The company was valued at more than $1 billion in November 2017.

In 2017, UK-based gay dating app Chappy was funded primarily by Bumble and Wolfe Herd. The app closed down in February 2020.

In 2019, Blackstone Inc. purchased a majority stake in MagicLab at a valuation of the company of $3 billion.

In 2020, MagicLab was renamed Bumble Inc.

In February 2021, the company became a public company via an initial public offering on the Nasdaq, raising $2.2 billion with a valuation of over $7 billion.

In February 2022, in its first acquisition, Bumble acquired Fruitz, a France-based freemium dating app popular with Generation Z in Europe. In May 2023, Bumble acquired Official, an app that helped couples strengthen their relationship through mood check-ins and date planning.

In February 2024, Bumble announced layoffs of 350 employees, 30% of its workforce, as part of a restructuring plan.

In June 2024, Bumble acquired Geneva, a friend-finding group chat app.

In January 2024, Wolfe Herd moved to executive chair of the company and hired Lidiane Jones as the Bumble Inc. CEO. One year later, in January 2025, Wolfe Herd announced that she would return as CEO in March 2025.

In June 2025, Bumble announced layoffs of 240 positions, or 30% of its workforce in a cost cutting measure that is assumed to save Bumble $40 million annually.
