= Katherine Center =

American author

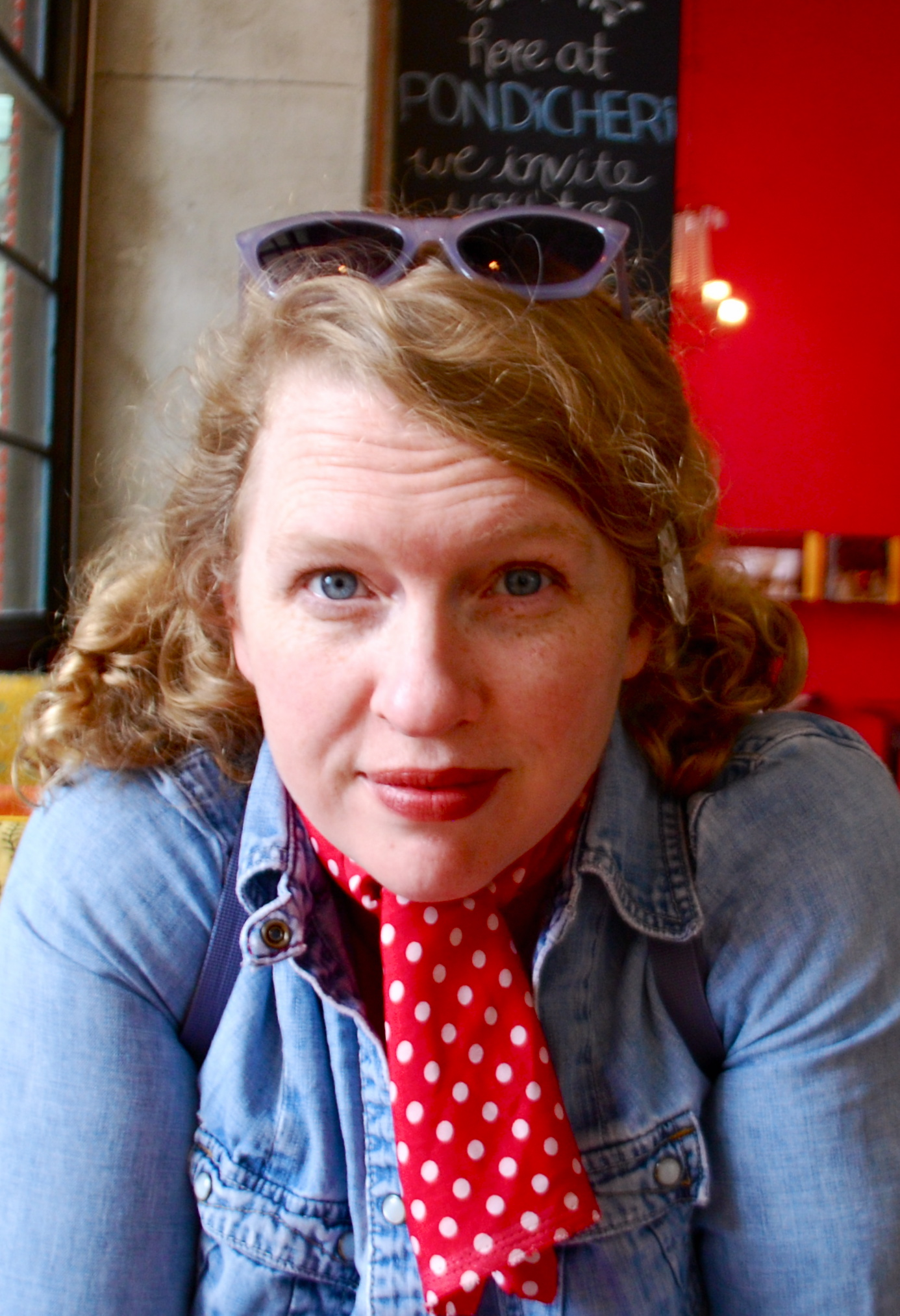
- Born: Katherine Sherar Pannill; March 4, 1972 (age 54); Houston, Texas, U.S.
- Education: Vassar College (AB); University of Houston (MA)
- Occupation: Author
- Relatives: Lizzie Fletcher (sister)

Katherine Sherar Pannill Center (born March 4, 1972) is an American author of contemporary fiction.

== Early life and education ==
Center was born and raised in Afton Oaks, Houston, Texas. She graduated from St. John's School and from Vassar College. She won the Vassar College Fiction Prize while a student. She received her M.A. in fiction from the University of Houston, where she was the co-editor of the literary fiction magazine, Gulf Coast. Her graduate thesis, Peepshow, a collection of stories, was a finalist for the Mary McCarthy Prize in Short Fiction. She has two sisters, one of whom is U.S. Representative Lizzie Fletcher.

== Career ==
Center is the author of several books, which she has called "bittersweet comic novels." Her first novel, The Bright Side of Disaster (2006), was optioned by Varsity Pictures, and her sixth, How to Walk Away (2018), was a New York Times bestseller and Book of the Month Club pick for May 2018 and a Target Book Club pick for July 2019. Center's 2019 novel Things You Save in a Fire was New York Times bestseller, and a Book of the Month Club pick for July 2019. Her 2022 novel, The Bodyguard debuted at #11 on the New York Times bestseller list, #35 on the USA Today bestseller list, and it was a Book of the Month Club pick for July 2022.

Along with Jeffrey Toobin and Douglas Brinkley, Center was one of the speakers at the 2007 Houston Chronicle Book and Author Dinner.

Center has published essays in Real Simple and the anthologies Because I Love Her, CRUSH: 26 Real-Life Tales of First Love, and My Parents Were Awesome.

Center also makes video essays, one of which, a letter to her daughter about motherhood, became the very popular Defining a Movement video for the Mom 2.0 conference. Center spoke at the 2018 TEDx Bend. Her talk was called "We Need to Teach Boys to Read Stories About Girls".

== Film ==
In 2020, a film adaptation of her novel The Lost Husband was released starring Leslie Bibb and Josh Duhamel. It hit number one on Netflix in August 2020 and wound up in their top 25 movies for the year. In 2021, a film adaptation of her 2015 novel Happiness For Beginners was filmed for Netflix starring Ellie Kemper and Luke Grimes for release in 2023. It hit Netflix's global Top 10 in 81 countries.

In September 2025, it was announced that a film adaptation of Center's novel The Bodyguard starring Jared Padalecki and Leighton Meester would begin filming in December and be released on Netflix.

== Books ==
- The Bright Side of Disaster (2006)
- Everyone is Beautiful (2009)
- Get Lucky (2010)
- The Lost Husband (2013)
- Happiness for Beginners (2015)
- How to Walk Away (2018)
- Things You Save in a Fire (2019)
- What You Wish For (2020)
- The Bodyguard (2022)
- Hello Stranger (2023)
- The Rom-Commers (2024)
- The Love Haters (2025)
- The Shippers (2026)
