= Lumen (dating app) =

Lumen was a dating app launched in 2018 for individuals over 50, co-founded by Antoine Argouges and Charly Lester. Their app attracted more than 1.5 million users in less than a year.

The app operated on a freemium model, allowing users to join for free while generating revenue through paid "premium" features. These features included advanced search filters, enabling users to refine potential matches based on criteria such as height, children, smoking habits, political views, and zodiac signs. Additionally, premium users could access features like viewing who had marked them as a "favorite."

To address the issue of scammers, the platform employed artificial intelligence software and implemented a "selfie" registration system. This system required users to take a live photograph during registration, which was then compared to their uploaded profile pictures to verify authenticity.

Lumen gained attention as part of MagicLab’s portfolio, which was acquired by Blackstone Inc. in a deal valuing the group at $3 billion. The app was closed down later by Blackstone in 2020.
