= Lidiane Jones =

Brazilian-American business executive

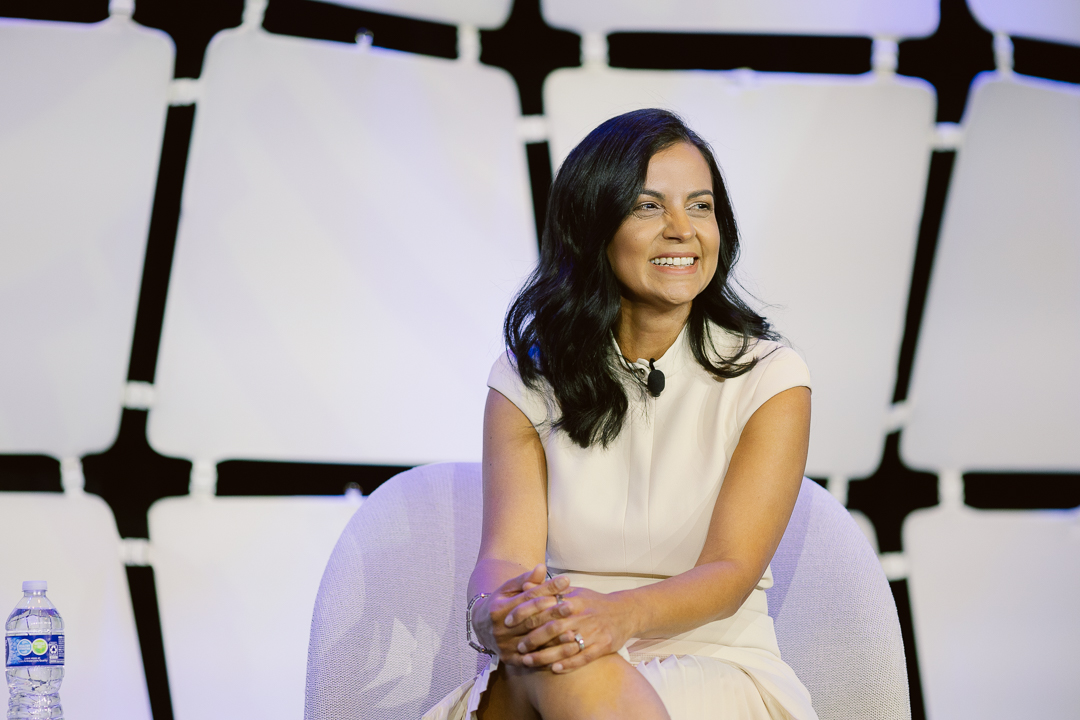
- Born: 1979 (age 46–47); São Paulo, Brazil
- Education: University of Michigan
- Occupation: Business executive
- Known for: Former CEO of Bumble; Former CEO of Slack Technologies

Lidiane Jones (born 1979) is a Brazilian-American business executive who was the chief executive officer (CEO) of Bumble, an online dating and social media site, between January 2024 and March 2025. Prior to leading Bumble, she was the CEO of Slack Technologies from January 2023 to November 2023, and held executive positions at Salesforce, Sonos, and Microsoft.

== Early life and education ==
Jones was born and raised in São Paulo, Brazil. Her mother worked as a cleaner and her father worked factory jobs. Her first experience with computers was through her selection to a computer programming class after winning a school contest while she was 13.

She attended the University of Michigan on a scholarship, where she earned her computer science degree in 2002.

== Career ==
After her internship with Apple Inc., Jones joined Microsoft as a software engineer, where she worked on the Excel product. In her 13-year career at Microsoft, she oversaw several of its post-acquisition integration efforts.

Jones left Microsoft in 2015 to join a consumer technology company Sonos where she was the vice president for software management. In 2019, she left to join Salesforce as senior vice president for product for its Commerce Cloud line of products. After multiple promotions, by 2022, she was executive vice president and general manager overseeing Commerce Cloud, Experience Cloud, and Marketing Cloud divisions.

In January 2023, Jones succeeded Stewart Butterfield, who co-founded Salesforce's subsidiary Slack Technologies, as its CEO.

She was appointed as CEO of online dating and networking company Bumble in November 2023, replacing its founder Whitney Wolfe Herd starting January 2024. In the same month, she stepped down as CEO of Slack.

In January 2025, it was announced that Jones would be stepping down as CEO of Bumble with Wolfe Herd returning as CEO in March.

== Personal life ==
Jones lives in Cambridge, Massachusetts. She is married. She met her husband while they worked at Microsoft, where he continues to work.
