= Eli Russell Linnetz =

American creative director and artist

- Born: Los Angeles, California
- Education: University of Southern California School of Cinematic Arts
- Occupations: Creative director; Fashion designer; Photographer; Artist
- Years active: 2000–present
- Label: ERL (2018–present)

Eli Russell Linnetz is an American creative director, fashion designer, photographer, and artist. He is the founder of the Venice Beach–based fashion label ERL.

== Early life and education ==
Linnetz was born in Los Angeles, California. He graduated from the University of Southern California's School of Cinematic Arts with a degree in screenwriting.

At age 15, he reached out to playwright David Mamet and was invited to assist him in on his theatrical and film/TV productions.

== Career ==
=== Film ===
Linnetz began his creative career as a child voice actor, most prominently providing the voice for the character "Tipo" in Disney's animated feature The Emperor's New Groove in 2000.

In 2015, Linnetz wrote, directed, and co-produced the short film Afterglow, starring Sawyer Spielberg and Mary Neely. The film was selected as a Vimeo Staff Pick and showcased at several international short film festivals.

=== Fashion ===
In November 2018, Linnetz launched ERL under the support of Comme des Garçons. The brand is based in his Venice Beach studio and draws from West Coast skate and surf culture, filtered through high-concept visual storytelling.

In 2021, rapper A$AP Rocky wore a custom ERL quilted look to the Met Gala.

In May 2022, Linnetz became the first American invited by Kim Jones to co-design a Dior Men's collection. The Dior x ERL capsule debuted with a runway presentation in Venice Beach, California.

In June 2022, Linnetz received the Karl Lagerfeld Award at the 2022 LVMH Prize.

In June 2023, Linnetz was named Guest Designer for the 104th edition of Pitti Immagine Uomo in Florence, Italy. It marked ERL's first full runway presentation. The collection reimagined Californian youth culture through the lens of Renaissance grandeur and theatrical surrealism.

=== Fine art and exhibitions ===
In 2017, Linnetz directed the short film You're In in collaboration with Comme Des Garçon and the Andy Warhol Foundation.

In 2019, Linnetz was featured in The Big Flat Now at Galerie Crone in Vienna, alongside Rosemarie Trockel, Jonathan Castro, Thomas Lohr, Mike Meiré, and Sterling Ruby.

In 2021, Linnetz was featured in the Metropolitan Museum of Art Costume Institute exhibition In America: A Lexicon of Fashion.

In 2024, Linnetz held his first solo exhibition, Monuments, at Jeffrey Deitch Gallery in Los Angeles. The installation featured sculptural reinterpretations of iconic American imagery.

=== Visual and creative direction ===
Linnetz has worked as a creative director, photographer, and visual collaborator for a wide range of major artists, global brands, and publications. His artist and celebrity collaborations include Lady Gaga, Grimes, Shawn Mendes, Justin Bieber, Selena Gomez, Hailey Bieber, Kim Kardashian, Kanye West, and A$AP Rocky. He has produced campaigns and visual content for brands such as Apple, Adidas, Tesla, Burberry, Bvlgari, Guess, Coca-Cola, Skims, and McDonalds.

Music videos include "Fade" (starring Teyana Taylor) for Kanye West featuring Post Malone, and "Nervous" for Shawn Mendes. On stage, he served as creative director for Lady Gaga's Las Vegas residency Enigma, and has provided live creative direction for Kanye West, Normani, Bad Bunny, Justin Bieber. In September 2020, Linnetz shared the previously unreleased music video for the Tyga song "Feel Me" through his Instagram account three years later after it was filmed in 2017, ultimately being scrapped after Tyga's breakup with Kylie Jenner. It features both Jenner and her older sister Kim Kardashian, partners of Tyga and Kanye West at the time, respectively.

Linnetz's photography has appeared on covers and in editorial features in numerous publications, including Vogue, GQ, Interview, DUST, Purple, 032c, Vogue Italia, Hypebeast, Highsnobiety, and Kaleidoscope. Notable shoots include Pharrell Williams, The Rock, and John Mulaney for the 2024 GQ "Man of the Year" issue, Hailey Bieber for Vogue, and numerous covers for Interview including The Weeknd and Selena Gomez.

== Awards and recognition ==
- 2023 – Guest Designer, Pitti Uomo
- 2022 – LVMH Prize for Young Designers – Karl Lagerfeld Award
- 2021 – CFDA Emerging Designer of the Year – nomination
- 2021 – GQ Breakthrough Designer of the Year
