= Ann Mather =

English business executive

- Born: 10 April 1960 (age 66); Stockport, United Kingdom
- Education: University of Cambridge
- Known for: CFO at Pixar (1999–2004)
- Board member of: Netflix; Bumble; Blend; Aible

Ann Mather (born 10 April 1960) is an English business executive. She is on the boards of directors of Netflix, Bumble, Pattern, Aible, and Blend. Her prior board experience includes Alphabet, Airbnb, Arista Networks, MGM Studios and Zappos. Mather was executive vice president and chief financial officer of Pixar Studios from September 1999 to April 2004, reporting to Steve Jobs.

== Early life ==
Mather was born in 1960. She attended the University of Cambridge in the United Kingdom, where she earned her M.A. degree with a major in geography and land economy.

== Career ==
After graduation, Mather moved to London, UK, where she started her career in the auditing firm KPMG. Following KPMG, she went to work for Paramount Pictures in 1984. While at Paramount from 1984 to 1988, she worked in London, Amsterdam and New York City. From 1992 to 1993 she worked for Disney in Paris to help start the international theatrical distribution arm in Europe. Prior to joining Disney, she was with Alico (a division of AIG, later acquired by MetLife). She held various executive positions at the Walt Disney Studios in Los Angeles from 1993 to 1999, including senior vice president of finance and administration for its Buena Vista International Theatrical Division. Right after leaving Disney, Mather was executive vice president and chief financial officer at Village Roadshow Pictures.

In 1999, Ann Mather was named executive vice president, chief financial officer, and company secretary of Pixar; a position she held from September 1999 to April 2004. After Pixar, she joined the board of Google and the boards of other public and private companies in the media and technology space.

== Board memberships ==
Mather is chairman of Bumble, and chairman of the audit committee of the board of directors of Alphabet, Netflix and Blend. Mather is also a director at Aible.

She previously was a director of Airbnb, Arista Networks, Zappos.com (acquired by Amazon.com in 2009), Shopping.com (acquired by eBay in 2005) as well as of Central European Media Enterprises, Shutterfly, Moneygram and Glu Mobile (from September 2005 to 10 February 2021). She was chairman of MGM Studios/lead independent director from 2010 to 2019.
