= Kareem Rahma =

American comedian and artist

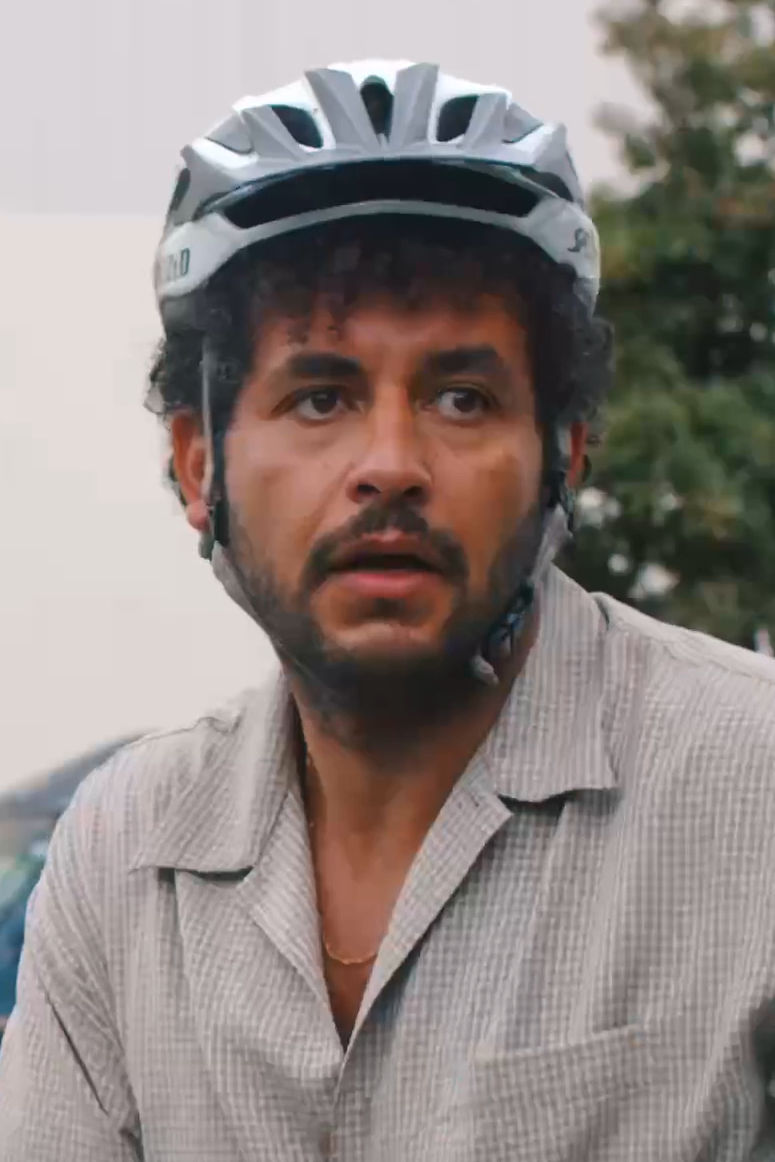
- Rahma in the 2022 short film Breakfast at the Bodega
- Born: July 15, 1986 (age 40); Cairo, Egypt
- Education: University of Minnesota (BA)
- Known for: SubwayTakes
- Spouse: Karina Muslimova (m. 2026)
- Children: 1

Kareem Sayed Rahma (Note: Egyptian Arabic: كريم رحمة) (born July 15, 1986) is an Egyptian-American comedian, artist, and media entrepreneur. Rahma is one of the founders of Nameless Network, a media company started by a group of former Vice employees. Rahma is a senior advisor to the film production company XTR. Previously, he worked at The New York Times. He has since gained wider recognition for his ongoing internet interview series, Subway Takes.

He has been nominated for one Emmy Award in 2026: Outstanding Short Form Comedy, Drama Or Variety Series. He has also been nominated for three Webby awards including Best Individual Performance, Best Longform Comedy, and Best Short Form Comedy.

== Biography ==
Rahma was born in Cairo and raised in Mendota Heights, Minnesota. In 2008, he received his bachelor's degree in journalism from the University of Minnesota, Twin Cities. He attended the master of business communication program at the University of St. Thomas.

== Career ==
After college, Rahma worked as Head of Audience Development at Vice Media Group which he described as "kind of like a marketing role, kind of like a digital role, it's kind of a content role, it's kind of a little bit of everything". In 2021, Rahma and Andrew Kuo co-founded the podcast company SomeFriends, which is focused on elevating BIPOC stories and talent, with the mission of entertaining everybody.

As Growth Editor at The New York Times, Rahma produced the outlet's first vertical video, a profile of Ryder Ripps that was available through Snapchat. After leaving the Times, Rahma (along with Alexandra Serio and Max Nelson) started a Kickstarter project called NYC.TV to bring public access TV online. This project brought short documentary films to The New York Times website in a project called Made With Kickstarter. The effort eventually led to the Nameless Network.

Rahma left The New York Times to pursue his "dream of entrepreneurship" in a venture which was a "Vice meets Vox meets NowThis news". It was in this role that Rahma realised: "I was not a good entrepreneur, not a good business person I should say. Good entrepreneur. Not a good business man."

Rahma created "Museum of Pizza", a pop-up immersive art exhibition focused on pizza. In 2010, he launched SheWearsYourTee.com, a marketing effort wherein Tanaya Henry became a walking billboard.

=== Entertainment career ===
Rahma is known for combining branded marketing and creative works. He has served as producer and executive producer for several films, including Miracle Fishing: Kidnapped Abroad and Ferguson Rises, both of which premiered at Tribeca Film Festival.

In 2020, he published a collection of poetry called We Were Promised Flying Cars, a book of haiku about the future. The book, which has been described as dystopian, was promoted through a series of Cameo appearances by celebrities, including Gilbert Gottfried and Anthony Scaramucci.

In 2020, he developed and produced "The Revolution Will be Televised", a video installation piece about police violence in the wake of George Floyd's murder. The video piece was projected onto the side of the Mill City Museum for several nights in June 2020.

Since 2022, Rahma has run a popular series, Keep the Meter Running, in which he interviews taxi drivers and visits their favorite spots in the city.

Also in 2022, Rahma starred in Nicolas Heller's short film Out of Order, which debuted at the 2022 Tribeca Festival. In 2025, he appeared in two episodes of the series Poker Face as a new tenant in Charlie's building.

==== Or Something (2025) ====
Or Something is a feature film co-written and co-starring Rahma and filmmaker Mary Neely. Premiering in New York City at The Downtown Festival in 2024, the film unfolds over a single day as two friends wander through the city in a continuous conversation about work, identity, and connection. The world premiere screening was followed by a conversation with Jeremy O. Harris.

Rahma conceived the project following the premiere of his earlier comedy short Out of Order (directed by New York Nico at the Tribeca Festival). Wanting to depart from overt comedy, Rahma cited the 1995 French film La Haine as an influence, collaborating with Neely after she responded to his social-media post about making a dialogue-driven New York story.

Rahma described Or Something as “a timeless and beautiful piece of cinema” made on a limited budget, emphasizing his punk-rock, DIY ethos toward filmmaking.

==== Keep the Meter Running (2022–present) ====
Rahma’s Keep the Meter Running debuted on TikTok in 2022 as a “hyperlocal, hyperpersonal” travel series exploring New York City through its taxi drivers. Each episode begins with Rahma instructing a cab driver, “Take me to your favorite place—and keep the meter running.” Together they visit restaurants and neighborhoods representing the driver’s heritage, including Ghanaian, Pakistani, and Caribbean eateries.

Described by Vanity Fair's Yohana Desta as reminiscent of Anthony Bourdain: Parts Unknown, the show pairs humor with human connection. Rahma concludes each ride by paying the full fare, sometimes several hundred dollars, and tipping generously, a gesture widely praised by viewers and drivers alike.

The series gained millions of views and has been recognized for its warmth, spontaneity, and documentary value in portraying the lives of immigrant New Yorkers.

==== Subway Takes (2023–present) ====
Launched in 2023, Subway Takes is a viral interview series created and hosted by Rahma, filmed on the New York City subway. Each episode features Rahma asking a passenger or celebrity, “So, what’s your take?” Guests—ranging from ordinary commuters to figures such as Cate Blanchett, Ramy Youssef, and David Byrne—offer a brief opinion, to which Rahma responds either “100 percent agree” or “100 percent disagree.”

The show’s signature microphones disguised as MetroCards, its unfiltered spontaneity, and Rahma’s empathetic humor earned comparisons to The Tonight Show and Humans of New York.

Profiles in The New Yorker, Rolling Stone, and W Magazine praised the project as "wholesome, relatable comedy" and "a snapshot of New York humanity". Despite occasional political moments such as an unreleased Vice President Kamala Harris segment, Rahma has emphasized that the show’s goal is connection rather than controversy.

==== Tonight's Special (2025) ====
In 2025 Rahma partnered with comedian Johnny Gaffney and director John Connor Hammond for Tonight's Special, a hybrid stand-up special released on YouTube's Omeleto channel.

Set in Brooklyn's iconic Kellogg's Diner, the project combines elements of live stand-up, ensemble comedy, and narrative film. The special features Rahma, Gaffney, Sahib Singh, Nina Tarr, Jason Choi, Andrew Casertano, and Janeane Garofalo.

According to Rahma, the show aims to "reimagine the comedy special" by blending cinematic storytelling with the spontaneity of live performance. Broadway World and V13 Media described Tonight's Special as a "one-of-a-kind comedy experience" that captures the energy and eccentricity of late-night New York.

==== Kareem Rahma & Tiny Gun (2024–present) ====
Kareem Rahma & Tiny Gun is Rahma's rock band formed with guitarist Tyler McCauley, drummer Dale Eisinger (YVETTE), guitarist Joe Tirabassi (Darlings), and bassist Matt Morello (Mr. Dream).

Atwood Magazine described the group's music as "raw, physical, and very New York", citing tracks such as "No Worries If Not" and "Baby I Could Never Win". Rahma emphasized that the project channels his lifelong devotion to "fun, fun, fun", while tackling themes of identity, rebellion, and humor.

== Awards ==
- In 2025 he received a Carnegie Corporation of New York Great Immigrant Award.
- He was featured as one of "7 People Who Made New York City a Better Place" by The New York Times
- He was named in Time Magazine's 2025 TIME100 creator's list.
- In 2024 he was featured on The Hollywood Reporter’s A-List of Top 50 Most Influential Influencers.

== Personal life ==
Rahma is married to Karina Muslimova. The couple welcomed a daughter in February 2024. He is Muslim.
