= Whitney Wolfe Herd =

Founder and CEO of Bumble (born 1989)

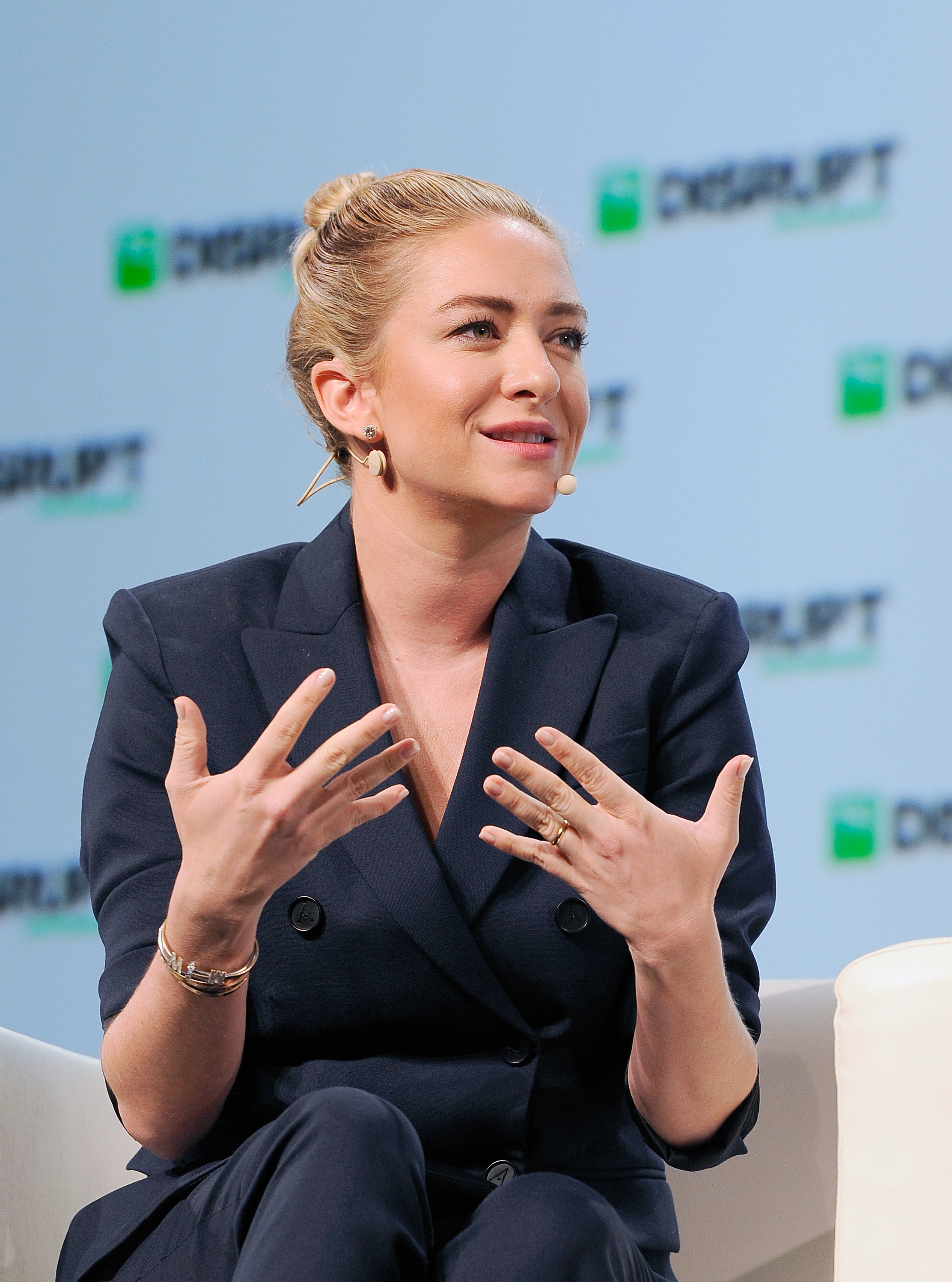
- Whitney Wolfe Herd in 2018
- Born: Whitney Wolfe; July 1, 1989 (age 37); Salt Lake City, Utah, U.S.
- Education: Southern Methodist University (BA)
- Occupations: Entrepreneur; business executive
- Known for: Founder and CEO of Bumble; Co-founder of Tinder
- Spouse: Michael Herd (m. 2017)
- Children: 3

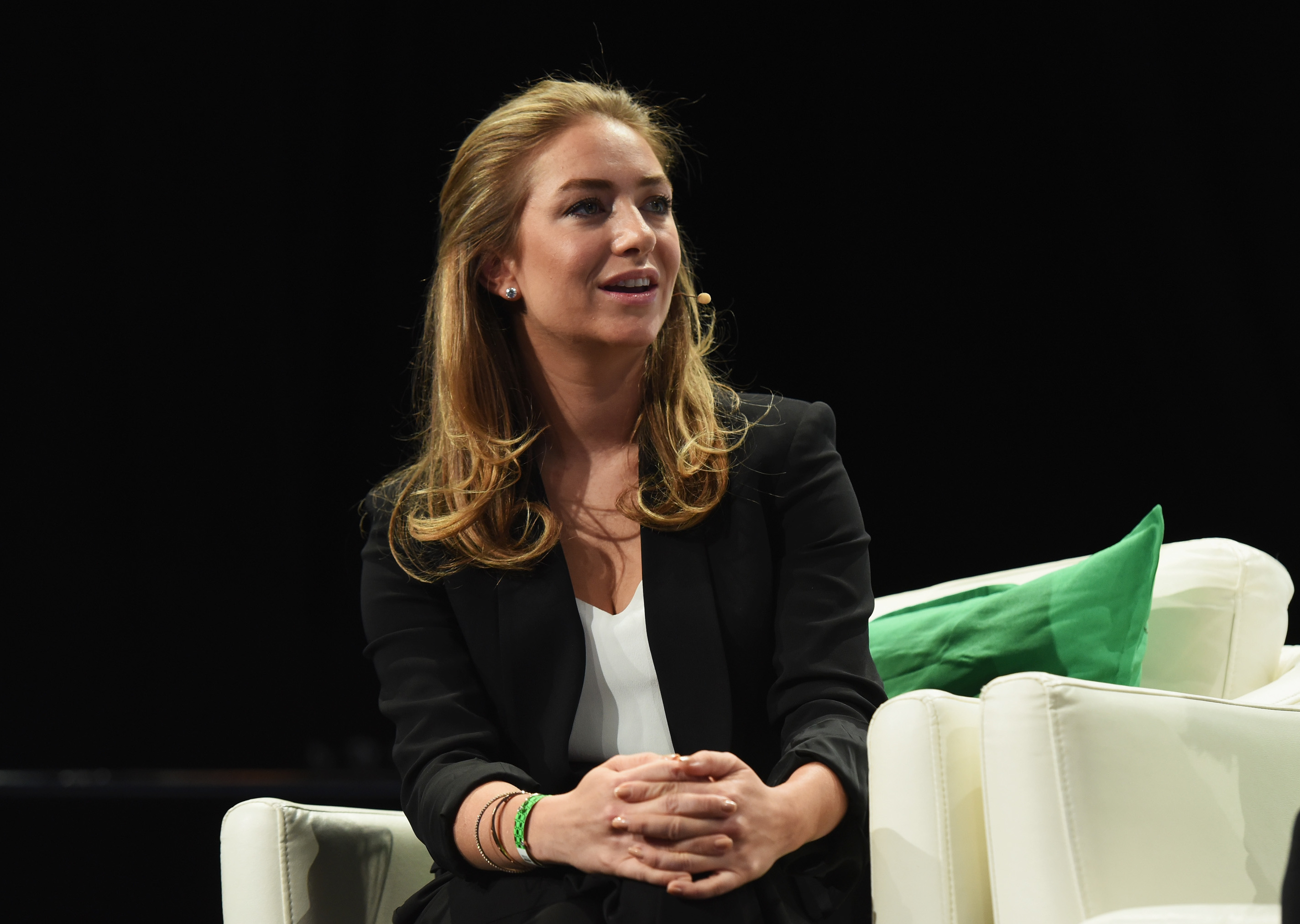
At a tech conference in 2016

Whitney Wolfe Herd (born July 1, 1989) is an American entrepreneur most notable as the founder, executive chair, and CEO of Bumble. She is a co-founder of Tinder and was previously its Vice President of Marketing.

Wolfe became the world's youngest female billionaire when she took Bumble public in 2021; she was also the youngest woman to take a company public in the United States, at age 31.

== Early life and education ==
Whitney Wolfe was born in Salt Lake City, Utah, to Kelly and Michael Wolfe.

Wolfe attended Judge Memorial Catholic High School. For college, she attended Southern Methodist University, where she majored in international studies and was a member of Kappa Kappa Gamma sorority.

While in college at the age of 20, she partnered with celebrity stylist Patrick Aufdenkamp to launch a non-profit organization, the Help Us Project, which sold bamboo tote bags to benefit areas affected by the Deepwater Horizon oil spill. The bags received national attention after celebrities, including Rachel Zoe and Nicole Richie, were photographed with them. Soon after, she launched a second venture with Aufdenkamp — a clothing line named Tender Heart.

After graduating, Wolfe Herd worked with orphanages in Southeast Asia.

== Career ==
=== Early career ===
In 2012, at age 22, Wolfe joined Cardify, a startup led by Sean Rad at the Hatch Labs business incubator. The project was later abandoned, but Wolfe joined the development team of Tinder (initially called MatchBox) with Rad and Christopher Gulczynski.

Before the app's launch, Wolfe was named vice president of marketing for Tinder. She reportedly came up with the name of the app, taking inspiration from the flame logo and the idea of tinder – easily combustible material used to start a fire. She has also been credited with fueling the app's initial popularity on college campuses and growing its user base.

Wolfe resigned from Tinder in April 2014. In September of that year, she received a more than $1 million settlement from her lawsuit against the company for sexual discrimination and sexual harassment after dating a Tinder co-founder who became "verbally controlling and abusive".

=== Bumble Inc. (2014–present) ===
After leaving Tinder, Wolfe started sketching out a female-only social network centered around compliments, which she then called Merci.

Badoo founder Andrey Andreev encouraged her to start a new dating app and brought her on as a partner in his company, MagicLab, later renamed Bumble Inc. Andreev retained 79% ownership in the company for an investment of $10 million, along with additional investments, consulting services, and use of Badoo's infrastructure; Wolfe served as CEO and received a 20% ownership stake. In December 2014, Wolfe moved to Austin, Texas to continue work on the app.

By December 2015, Bumble had reached more than 15 million conversations and 80 million matches.

During this time, Wolfe received several distinctions and honors in the media. In 2014, she was named one of Business Insider's 30 Most Important Women Under 30 In Tech. In May 2016, she was featured as one of Elle's Women in Tech. She was also named to the Forbes 30 Under 30 lists in both 2017 and 2018.

In 2018, she was featured as one of InStyle’s "50 Women Who Are Changing the World" and Time named her to the Time 100 list.

In April 2019, Bumble released the first print issue of Bumble Mag in partnership with Hearst.

In November 2019, Andreev sold a majority stake in Bumble Inc. to The Blackstone Group. Whitney Wolfe Herd received an ownership stake of approximately 19% and was named CEO of the company, then valued at $3 billion with an estimated 75 million users.

In 2020, Bumble Inc. replaced MagicLab as the parent company of both Bumble and Badoo. At the time, Bumble had more than 100 million users worldwide.

In February 2021, Bumble Inc. became a public company via an initial public offering. Wolfe Herd's 18-month-old son was on her hip as she rang the Nasdaq bell. With this IPO launch, she became the world's youngest female billionaire as well as the youngest woman to lead an initial public offering in the United States, at age 31.

In 2021, Wolfe Herd was named to Bloomberg's 50 Most Influential ranking. In 2022, Forbes listed Wolfe Herd at number 33 of its top 100 "America's richest self-made women".

In November 2023, Wolfe Herd announced she would enter the role of executive chair in January 2024, with Lidiane Jones stepping into the position of CEO of Bumble.

In May 2024, Wolfe Herd noted the potential for using artificial intelligence to assist in online dating.

In January 2025, Bumble announced that Wolfe Herd would return as CEO in mid-March, replacing Jones, who was stepping down for personal reasons. Wolfe Herd owns approximately 23 million shares of Bumble Inc.

== Personal life ==
In December 2013, she met oil and gas heir Michael Herd on a skiing trip in Aspen, Colorado. They married in 2017 in Positano, Italy. They have two sons, born in 2019 and 2022. The family lives in Austin, Texas.

The 2025 film Swiped is based on Wolfe Herd’s life and stars Lily James.

=== Advocacy ===
In March 2019, Wolfe Herd testified before the Texas House Criminal Jurisprudence committee about the prevalence of unsolicited explicit photos sent to female users on dating applications.
