= Andrey Andreev =

Russian-British entrepreneur (born 1974)

- Андрей Андреев
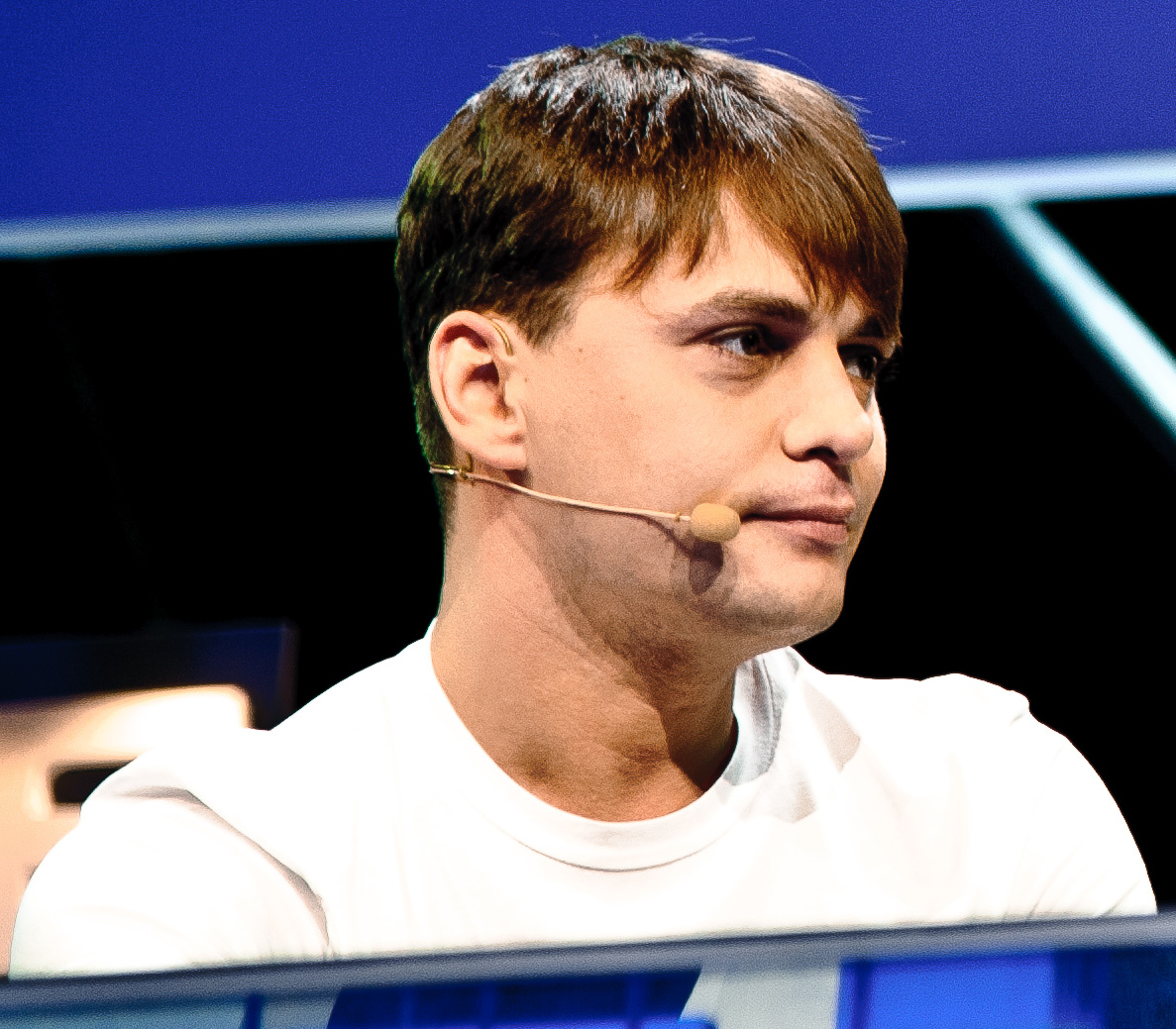
- Andreev at LeWeb in 2011
- Born: Andrey Vagnerovich Ogadzhanyants; 3 February 1974 (age 52); Moscow, Russian SFSR, Soviet Union
- Citizenship: British
- Occupation: Entrepreneur
- Known for: Badoo, Bumble

Andrey Andreev (Russian: Андрей Андреев, romanized: Andrey Andreyev; born Andrey Vagnerovich Ogadzhanyants Russian: Андрей Вагнерович Огаджанянц, romanized: Andrey Vagnerovich Ogadzhanyants; 3 February 1974) is a Russian-born British tech entrepreneur. He is known for founding the dating and social networking apps Bumble and Badoo, amongst others.

In 2019, Andreev sold his 79% stake in the apps' holding company, MagicLab (now Bumble Inc.), to Blackstone Inc. at a $3 billion valuation. In 2020, he founded social audio app Stereo. His previous ventures include SpyLog, Begun, and Mamba.

== Early and personal life ==
Andreev was born and raised in Moscow, Russia. In interviews, Andreev discussed an early interest in communication technology; he built a homemade radio as a preteen and the first person he spoke to was from New York.

In 2005, he moved to London, England, settling in Covent Garden. He became a British citizen in 2008.

Andreev lists cooking as one of his greatest passions and contributes dishes to the menus of his favorite restaurants. The sweet onion soup 'Andreï Style' at two-Michelin-starred L'Atelier de Joël Robuchon in Covent Garden, London, is named after him.

In 2018, Andreev made the Forbes' global list of billionaires for the first time. As of February 2026, his net worth was estimated at $2.1 billion.

He was played by Dan Stevens in the 2025 movie Swiped.

== Career ==
=== Early entrepreneurship ===
In 1992, after dropping out of a management course at the University of Moscow within a year of enrollment, Andreev moved to Valencia, Spain. He began startups and sold them for a profit. Two such ventures were Virus (1995 to 1997), an online Russian business selling computers, and SpyLog (1999 to 2001), software for web owners that tracks visitors.

In 2002, Andreev founded the digital advertising firm, Begun. In 2003, he sold the majority share of the company to Russian investment firm Finam Holdings and sold his remaining stake in 2004.

In 2004, Andreev founded the freemium, desktop-based dating site, Mamba. In its first year of operation, Mamba grew to more than 4 million users. In 2006, he sold his stake in the company for an undisclosed amount.

=== Badoo ===
In 2006, Andreev launched Badoo, a social networking and photo-sharing app. Initially developed to compete with Facebook, Andrey decided to pivot to dating after the release of the iPhone. The company experienced rapid growth throughout Europe and Latin America, growing to nearly 12 million users within the first year.

In an article in 2011, Wired described Badoo as a 'mass phenomenon' in Brazil, Mexico, France, Spain, and Italy. By 2019, Badoo had 425 million registered users globally and operated in 190 countries.

According to a 2018 Forbes investigation, thirteen employees reported a toxic culture at Badoo's London headquarters. This included circulation of pornography of an employee and a culture of parties with prostitutes and illegal drug consumption, photos of which were shared via internal emails. Forbes accused Andreev of knowledge of the events via email, but not participation in them. Additionally, female employees were sexually harassed and assaulted and described tolerating this to achieve career progression. Forbes additionally reported that parts of this culture were beginning to change, including diversity and inclusion training and cessation of naming technical updates after pornography performers.

In a 2017 interview, Andreev claimed that Badoo had invented the popular dating application "swipe" feature. Andreev also introduced industry-standard paid features such as 'rise up' and the 'lookalike' feature that allows users to search for others who have similar characteristics to their favorite celebrity. In an October 2017 interview with Shortlist, Andreev stated his philosophy and management style is, "to make people happy", describing Badoo's company culture and the perks they offered including food and parties.

In April 2019, Andreev committed 100% of Badoo's revenue to restore the Notre Dame Cathedral in Paris following the fire.

=== Bumble ===
In 2014, Andreev contacted former Tinder marketing executive Whitney Wolfe about working together. Andreev initially offered Wolfe a role as Chief Marketing Officer at Badoo, but she refused. He persuaded her to move back into the dating space by offering her funding and access to Badoo's team. In December 2014, they launched Bumble.

Speaking to The Guardian, Wolfe named Andreev as her biggest mentor in business and that he, "took the chance on her when no one else would", and that "without him, the Bumble journey wouldn’t have been possible."

Per their agreement, Andreev oversaw the company's operations and leveraged Badoo's infrastructure and engineering resources. He provided US$10 million in funding and owned 79% of the company. Wolfe was founder and CEO, and owned 20%. Bumble shared infrastructure with Badoo at its London office.

Bumble was valued at more than $1 billion in November 2017.

=== MagicLab ===
Andreev launched MagicLab, a holding company that builds and owns dating and social networking apps Badoo, Bumble, Lumen, Chappy, and Hot or Not in partnership with their founders. In November 2019, he sold his shares to Blackstone Inc. at a $3 billion valuation for the company. In 2020, MagicLab was renamed Bumble Inc. after the transaction.

=== Stereo ===
In 2020, after the sale of MagicLab to Blackstone, Andreev launched the social audio app Stereo. The app allows users to interact with live talks via hosting and listening capabilities. The company has offices in London and Los Angeles, with 20 former MagicLab employees involved.
