= The Lost Husband =

2020 American romance film

- Film poster
- Directed by: Vicky Wight
- Screenplay by: Vicky Wight
- Based on: The Lost Husband by Katherine Center
- Produced by: Leslie Bibb; Bridget Stokes; Vicky Wight
- Starring: Leslie Bibb; Josh Duhamel
- Cinematography: Aaron Kovalchik
- Edited by: Suzanne Spangler
- Music by: Sherri Chung
- Production company: Six Foot Pictures
- Distributed by: Quiver Distribution; Redbox Entertainment
- Release date: April 10, 2020
- Running time: 109 minutes
- Country: United States
- Language: English

The Lost Husband is a 2020 American romantic drama film written and directed by Vicky Wight and starring Leslie Bibb and Josh Duhamel. It is based on Katherine Center's 2013 novel of the same name. The film was released to video on demand on April 10, 2020 by Quiver Distribution and Redbox Entertainment.

== Plot ==
Libby, a single mother, and her two children, Abby and Tank, move to her Aunt Jean's goat farm in central Texas looking for a fresh start. Aunt Jean instructs James O'Connor, her farm manager, to teach Libby the ropes of keeping up the farm. Libby is not thrilled about the idea, but accepts because she needs a job. Slowly, Libby and the children start getting used to their new life on the farm.

Libby develops her farm skills and begins bonding with James. The children also bond with him, who enjoys playing with Tank and teaching Abby how to defend herself from a bully at her new school who picks on her for her limp, which she got in the car accident that killed her father. Abby gets suspended from school for punching him and, although Libby is upset with James for teaching her karate, she realizes Abby trusted James to tell about the bullying issues while she had been too afraid to talk about it with Libby and adding to her stress.

Later in the film Abby is suspended again for using curse words on the bully, who had hit her in the head. James drives Libby to school to pick Abby up, and when he runs into the bully, he threatens him.

The family also meets and bonds with Jean's boyfriend Russ McAllen, and his granddaughter Sunshine. One night, Sunshine takes Libby to an abandoned house which she says belongs to Jean, but she has not lived there since her husband Frank died. Sunshine suggests Libby try to communicate with her dead husband.

Although Libby does not take the idea of talking with the dead too seriously, she does have a sentimental and raw moment delivering a monologue as if she were talking to Danny. The fire they had made suddenly goes out, leaving Libby thinking maybe he was in fact able to hear her. Throughout the next days we slowly see Libby acquire a sense of closure about her husband's death.

During Jean's birthday party, more is learned about James. After five years of marriage, his wife fell for another man and asked for a divorce. A few months after the divorce, she had a stroke and required full-time care from a nurse. James had stepped in to help her constantly, as her new boyfriend had left her as soon as things got hard.

One day, Libby decides to visit the big abandoned house again and finds a picture of her as a baby with Jean and Frank. She confronts Aunt Jean about it, finding out that Marsha had abandoned her as a newborn and left her at that house at the care of her grandparents. However, due to their delicate health, it was Jean who had cared for her until Marsha came back four years later for the grandmother's funeral and took Libby away.

Libby drives to Marsha's home to confront her about it. Marsha tries to defend herself by saying she was only 18 at the time and needed time to mature, and that it was always her intention to get Libby back. However, Libby does not believe her and claims that when Marsha saw how happy Libby, Jean, and Frank were as a family, she took Libby back out of jealousy and spite. Libby declares she never wants to see her again, and leaves.

Libby goes back to the farm and asks Jean to let her restore the house, so she can live there with her children, assuring her that she will continue to take care of the farm. As much as she has lost during the past year, Libby has finally found a place that feels like home.

In the end scene, we see Libby fixing the house when James comes by to tell her he had been helping his ex-wife move in with her parents, so they could take care of her. Bringing closure to that chapter in his life, he declares he is back and ready to continue working on the farm. They kiss, ending the film.

== Cast ==
- Leslie Bibb as Libby Moran
- Josh Duhamel as James O'Connor
- Nora Dunn as Jean
- Isiah Whitlock Jr. as Russ McAllen
- Sharon Lawrence as Marsha
- Kevin Alejandro as Danny
- Herizen F. Guardiola as Sunshine
- Callie Hope Haverda as Abby Moran
- Roxton Garcia as Tank Moran
- Stone Garcia as Jimmy
- Georgia King as Jessica
- Carly Pope as Lanie

== Reception ==
As of October 2021, 55% of the 22 reviews compiled by Rotten Tomatoes are positive, and they have an average score of 5.8/10. The site's critical consensus reads, "It won't set hearts a-flutter for anyone who isn't a dedicated romantic, but audiences in the mood for love might like The Lost Husband." Tara McNamara of Common Sense Media awarded the film three stars out of five. Brian Tallerico of RogerEbert.com awarded the film two and a half stars.
