= SubwayTakes =

Internet talk show

- Genre: Talk, comedy, current events
- Format: video
- Country of origin: United States
- Language: English

Cast and voices
- Hosted by: Kareem Rahma

Production
- Length: varied

Publication
- Original release: July 31, 2023
- Provider: YouTube

Related

YouTube information
- Channel: SubwayTakes with Kareem Rahma
- Years active: 2023–present
- Subscribers: 970 thousand
- Views: 634 million
- Last updated: May 17, 2026

SubwayTakes, also Subway Takes, is an internet talk show hosted by comedian and media personality Kareem Rahma. Similar to the "man on the street" style of video, the show features interviews by Rahma of civilians and celebrities in the New York City Subway, using a microphone clipped to a MetroCard, in which the interviewees present and defend a unique or controversial opinion, called a "take".

== Background ==
SubwayTakes is an internet talk show co-founded by Kareem Rahma and Andrew Kuo. The show is hosted by Rahma, who uses a MetroCard with a microphone clipped to it to interview people on a subway. Rahma prompts the interviewee with "So what's your take?", after which they must "defend" their take in the face of Rahma's agreement or disagreement.

SubwayTakes includes branded content and has featured takes paid for by Google, Microsoft, Hulu, StreetEasy and H&M. Rahma and his guests have had brands including H&M, Urban Outfitters, KOTN, and J. Crew sponsor their outfits. Rahma worked closely with Google on the take about "Android Users as Better Lovers": "I said let's bring her back and let's incorporate any message you want to do into this video. And so we developed a take together with the brand, with the talent." Rahma has described SubwayTakes' approach to branded content, saying, "It seems like brands have a really cool time and they trust us to do our thing. So any brand that comes to us, we will figure it out. Some just want us to do whatever we want and they just want the collab post [...] Others want product placement."

SubwayTakes has expanded to Chicago with their series, L Takes, and to London in the form of Tube Takes.

== History ==
SubwayTakes began in 2023. According to The New York Times, Rahma and Kuo created the show "almost as a whim", but it also served as a gamble to "need to turn this into something that might actually [financially] benefit [them]".

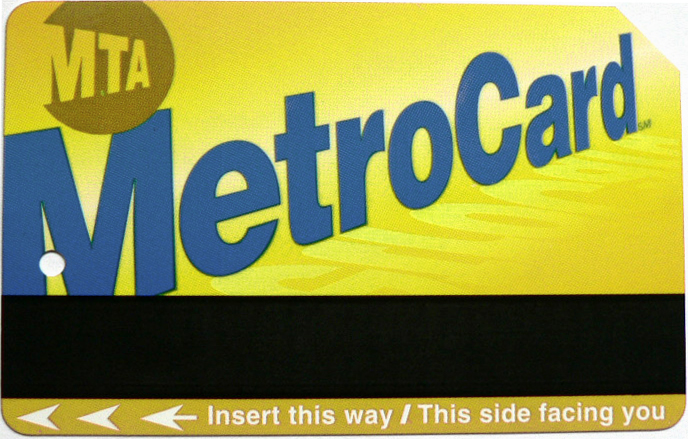
The MTA MetroCard that is used to clip to the mic when filmed in New York City

In early 2024, SubwayTakes doubled the number of episodes that they produced per week from two to four.

In August 2024, SubwayTakes was invited to interview presidential candidate Kamala Harris and her running mate Tim Walz. During Rahma's interview of Harris, Harris surprised Rahma when she diverted from the pre-approved take against removing shoes on airplanes to a "Bacon is a spice" take. Rahma, who is Muslim and cannot eat pork due to his religious beliefs, asked if she could do the pre-approved take. But, after being advised by a staffer, Harris moved to a pro-anchovies-on-pizza take. Rahma later expressed apprehension of both takes. After Walz's interview was published, Harris's campaign apologized for the bacon take and offered to do a reshoot, which Rahma declined.

SubwayTakes partnered with Talkhouse Network to release a long-form version of SubwayTakes in February 2025. The podcast was named SubwayTakes Uncut.

In an April 2026 SubwayTakes Uncut episode with Julian Casablancas, lead singer of the Strokes and the Voidz, Casablancas criticized "American Zionists" for benefiting from "white privilege" and then "talk[ing] like they are Black people during slavery," to which Rahma said he agreed while denouncing the slaughter of Palestinians in the Gaza war. In his column "Antisemitism Decoded" in the Jewish-American news outlet The Forward, writer Arno Rosenfeld focused on this incident as the primary window for what he described as contemporary "antisemitism". Casablancas also compared the October 7 attacks on Israel to Native American uprisings and revolts during slavery as a response to theoretical counter.
