= Badoo =

Dating-focused social networking service

- Website type: Dating
- Available in: 47 languages
- Headquarters: London, United Kingdom
- Country of origin: United Kingdom
- Owners: Bumble Inc. (formerly MagicLab)
- Creator: Andrey Andreev
- Parent: Badoo Trading Limited
- Website: badoo.com
- Commercial: Freemium
- Registration: Required
- Launched: November 14, 2006; 20 years ago
- Current status: Active

Badoo is an online dating-focused and social networking application. Founded by Andrey Andreev in 2006, Badoo originally launched as a web product. It has headquarters in London. In 2012, the app was launched in the United States and later became a brand of Bumble Inc.

As of 2025, Badoo operates in 190 countries and is available in 47 languages, making it the world's most widely used dating network. The app is available on iOS, Android, Google Play, and the web. Badoo operates on a freemium model, whereby the core services can be used without payment.

== History ==
First logo, used from November 2006–April 2017

Second logo, used from April 2017–June 2019

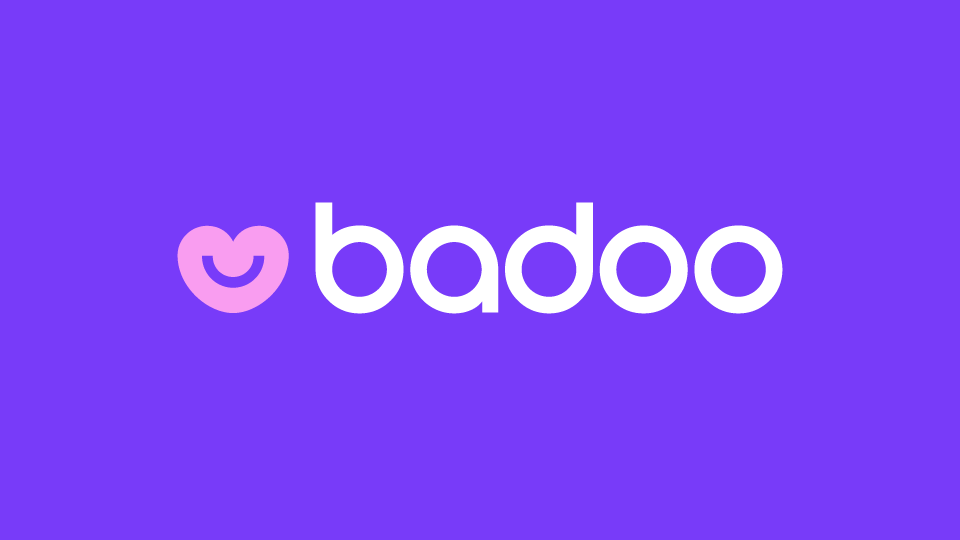
Third logo, used from June 2019–February 2022

Fourth logo, used from February 2022–November 2023

Fifth logo, used from November 2023–2026

Badoo was founded by Andrey Andreev and launched in London on 14 November 2006. It has since ranked among the most popular dating websites.

In 2007, Badoo raised $30 million in funding. In January 2008, Finam Capital paid $30 million for a 10% stake in Badoo for expansion in Russia. Badoo also reached 13 million users in 2008.

The official launch of Badoo in the U.S. was on March 23, 2012, with Nick Cannon introducing the service in the United States.

In 2014, Badoo’s CEO Andrey Andreev contacted Bumble’s Whitney Wolfe Herd to form a partnership: Andreev received 79% ownership in the company for an initial investment of $10 million, along with additional investments; Wolfe Herd served as founder, CEO, and 20% owner. As part of the agreement, the new company would also utilize Badoo's infrastructure and Andreev's consulting. Wolfe Herd said the partnership was key due to Andreev's "knowledge and infrastructure".

In 2016, Badoo was the most downloaded dating app in 21 countries.

In April 2017, Badoo launched a newly redesigned app and brand, as well as the tagline "Bigger than Dating". Andreev discussed this redesign in an interview with Business Insider's James Cook in the same month.

Andreev created Magic Lab in 2019 as the parent company of both Bumble and Badoo. In November 2019, Andreev sold his majority stake in Bumble and Badoo to Blackstone Inc. in a deal that valued the companies at $3 billion.

In 2020, Bumble Inc. replaced MagicLab as Badoo’s parent company, with Badoo becoming a subsidiary product.

Badoo launched its “Let’s Fix Dating” global marketing campaign in 2022.

== Features ==
Badoo has several features that enable users to meet people. When first signing up, individuals select whether they want to “match” with new people in order to date, chat or make new friends. Users can chat via in-app messaging, upload photos and videos, as well as share their interests to find any friends in common.

The main features include:

- Discover: Users can see and contact people who live in their area, as well as their location
- Encounters: Another free feature, where users swipe right (yes) or left (no) on other users' profiles based on search criteria (i.e. distance, age, interests). Users are able add their personal interests on their own profile and can search for compatible matches using advanced search filters, such as dating intentions. Users can add a “mood” to their profile and also see other users’ moods
- In-App Video Chat and Calls: In August 2017, Badoo launched its video chat function that allows users to connect real-time, once they've exchanged messages

Safety features include:

- Photo Verification: The company has also developed a photo verification process, where users upload a photo of themselves mimicking a specific pose.
- Selfie Request: A feature used to ensure users are real and verified. Such features include the 'selfie request' button, through which women can request a man they're speaking to send a 'selfie' to prove they are the same person as in the pictures. This 'selfie request' feature is only available to female account holders; it is unavailable to male Badoo users
- Private Detector: Launched in 2020, this features uses AI to identify potentially offending photos, automatically blurring them and providing a user warning for “inappropriate content”
- Message Detector: ‘Rude Message Detector’ automatically flags any discriminatory or overtly sexual messages. This features uses machine learning AI to distinguish between “banter” and verbal abuse
- Screenshot Block: In 2021, Badoo released its Screenshot Block feature, intended to discourage sharing private information and photos without permission. Android users could no longer take screenshots of the app, whereas iOS users got a warning message
- Deception Detector: In 2024, Deception Detector was added to identify spam and fake profiles using AI. The machine learning model is capable of blocking 95% scam accounts automatically

Badoo is a freemium service, where the basic service is free for everyone but users have an option to pay for premium features. Such features include, ‘Rise Up’, which allows users to place their profile at the top of search results for matches in their respective area. Users can also pay to have their profile photo more widely visible across the site.

== Reception ==
In a peer-reviewed study by Cambridge University in 2009, it was given the lowest score for privacy among the 45 social networking sites examined.

In 2011, The Economist dubbed Badoo “a nightclub on your smartphone” and Wired described Badoo as a "mass phenomenon" in Brazil, Mexico, France, Spain, and Italy. That same year, Finnish newspaper Iltalehti reported that numerous Badoo profiles were created without people's consent, and Badoo was asked to adjust its approach after going viral on Facebook through popular social games and quizzes.

A 2012 CNET review by Rafe Needleman noted that, while the site was advertised as a way to meet local friends with shared interests, it was more like a photo-based dating site. He also said the way it matches users was "obscure".

According to Google's transparency report on the requests for search removals stemming from the "right to be forgotten" ruling, Badoo had the eighth-highest number of URLs removed from Google Search in 2014, with Facebook, YouTube, Google Groups and Twitter receiving a higher number of these requests.

In 2018, Badoo was the subject of a Forbes investigative report, finding that thirteen Badoo employees reported a culture of workplace afterparties involving use of recreational drugs and prostitutes, along with several instances of sexual assault and harassment. Consequently, MagicLab hired Doyle Clayton, an employment law firm, to internally investigate these allegations. Following a six-month investigation, MagicLab announced that it would reform its workplace policies to “enforce appropriate employee conduct”, “make it easier for whistleblowers to report misconduct”, and improve diversity and inclusion training.

== See also ==
- Comparison of online dating services
- Timeline of online dating services
