= Bumble =

American social media company (founded 2014)

- Developer: Bumble Inc.
- Release: December 2014; 11 years ago
- Type: Online dating, social networking
- Website: bumble.com

Bumble is an American mobile app for online dating and social networking. It was founded by Whitney Wolfe Herd and was launched in December 2014. Bumble is operated by Bumble Inc., which also owns Badoo.

In 2025, the app had 2.4 million paying users. It is one of the most popular dating applications in the United States.

Profiles of potential matches are displayed to users, who can "swipe left" to reject a candidate or "swipe right" to indicate interest; if two users both indicate interest in each other, communication can begin.

== History ==
The Bumble app was founded by Whitney Wolfe Herd, shortly after she left Tinder, and Andrey Andreev, founder of Badoo. The name Bumble was inspired by the matriarchal structure of bee societies, where “the woman is in charge” and the community is built on respect— two values the company aimed to bring into the user experience it created. The app was launched in December 2014. It used infrastructure in Badoo's London headquarters.

In August 2015, Wolfe Herd stated that within the app's first eight months, it saw 5 million unique conversations initiated.

In March 2017, Bumble had more than 800 million matches and 10 billion swipes per month and was the second most popular Lifestyle app in the Apple App Store.

In December 2018, Bumble launched in India. It acquired over 1 million users in India in the first four months of its launch. Actress Priyanka Chopra is an investor in Bumble.

By July 2020, Bumble had been downloaded over 100 million times. In 2022, Bumble began offering free courses from Bloom, an online provider of support for sexual assault survivors.

Wolfe Herd announced she would be stepping down as Bumble's CEO in January 2024, and the former Slack CEO, Lidiane Jones, would assume the role. In February 2025, Bumble announced that it would discontinue the Fruitz and Official apps by mid-2025 to concentrate on its core brands, Bumble and Badoo."

In 2025, Bumble has decided to unify its friendship service into a standalone BFF app in the United States, which was previously known as Bumble For Friends app and BFF Mode.

In June 2026 the company's stock had fallen significantly and it began courting offers for a buyer. By October 2026, the company was in advanced talks to go private, to be purchased by Itasca Holdings for $1 Billion.

In August 2026, Bumble changed its rule to permit men to initiate conversations on the app.

== Operation ==
In December 2025, The Observer reported that Bumble relies on a legacy technology stack that was first built in 2005 due to Bumble's partnership with Badoo. The stack includes an in-house payment system and physical servers maintained by Bumble employees. Following her return as Bumble CEO, Wolfe Herd ordered a rebuild of Bumble's technology in a project known as "Bumble 2.0", in which the Bumble app would be rewritten from scratch.

=== Matching users ===
Users swipe right to "like" a potential match and left to reject them. In matches between a man and a woman, the woman must initiate the conversation with their match or the matches disappear within 24 hours unless the woman has set an opening question, to which the man can respond. In a same-sex match, either person can reach out first or set an opening question. In 2024, this system was changed so that women no longer have to make the first move during matches.

Users can sort conversations, make calls, and send photo messages.

Through BFF mode, introduced in March 2016, users can match with platonic friends of the same sex, in the same way as matching for dates.

If a user is messaged after matching with a potential partner and does not respond within 24 hours, the match disappears; this requirement was implemented in April 2016 to combat ghosting. In August, 2026, the requirement was extended to 72 hours. Before the update, men were allowed unlimited time to respond to a message from women. An update was also launched for same-sex matches, with either party allowed to initiate and the other having to respond within 24 hours.

Over time, the app introduced a wider range of gender identity options for users to identify as genderqueer or transgender.

In August 2024, 61% of Bumble users were men and 37% of users were female. That month, Bumble began developing a chatbot to act as a wingman and help users with flirting.

=== Content moderation ===
Starting in October 2016, the app banned mirror selfies, obscured faces, and photos of users in underwear among others.

In August 2017, Bumble partnered with the Anti-Defamation League to remove users who display hate speech or symbols in their profiles.

In March 2018, Bumble banned photos of users posing with guns following the Parkland high school shooting.

In 2023, the Bureau of Investigative Journalism found that many content moderators working for Bumble suffered from mental health issues, including anxiety, depression, and PTSD associated with their work, with concerns about professional mental health support, productivity targets, and understaffing.

Fake profiles and photos using artificial intelligence are prohibited and may be reported. In April 2019, Bumble launched Private Detector, an image classifier that uses artificial intelligence to automatically detect and blur nude images. It allows users to decide if they want to view, block or report the unsolicited image. Bumble made the tool open source in October 2022. In February 2024, Bumble introduced Deception Detector, a machine learning model that detects fake user profiles. Of those accounts identified as spam/scam profiles, Bumble Inc.'s testing showed that Deception Detector was able to block up to 95% these accounts automatically. That March, Bumble collaborated with Phaedra Parks, Parvati Shallow and Peter Weber of the Peacock reality show The Traitors to launch the feature.

=== User verification ===
Originally, Bumble users were required to log in via Facebook when signing up. Following the Facebook–Cambridge Analytica data scandal, Bumble added an option to sign up using only a phone number. For users who sign up with Facebook, information from their account is used to build a profile with photos and basic information, including the user's college and job.

Bumble launched a photo verification tool in September 2016 to ensure that users of the app were the same people in their profile pictures. To be verified, users are asked to submit a selfie of them performing a specific pose; the picture is reviewed by a real person who ensures the user is the person in the profile pictures. Bumble was the first dating app to include photo verification in the US. In 2025, the app also included an option to become ID-verified.

=== Filters ===
In 2020, Bumble announced a temporary feature that allowed users to expand their distance filters to match with anyone in the same country. Previously, the app only allowed people to connect within a 100-mile (160 km) range. Daters could also add a "virtual dating" badge to their profile to indicate that they are willing to date over video calls.

On January 15, 2021, Bumble temporarily suspended the option to filter matches by political preference to "prevent misuse". The move came after several women allegedly used Bumble to gather information from people involved in the January 6 United States Capitol attack, and then forwarded that information to the FBI. Bumble was criticized by many of its users for being perceived to "protect terrorists" by suspending the filter. Bumble announced that it would be reinstating the option to filter by political preferences later that day.

=== Paid features ===
In August 2016, Bumble introduced paid features including Beeline, a list of users who have liked the user; Rematch, which keeps expired matches in a user's queue for 24 additional hours; and Extend, which allows users unlimited 24-hour extensions for matches.

=== Other features ===
In June 2016, the app began allowing users to connect their Spotify accounts to their Bumble profiles to show their music interests.

In 2017, the company launched a career networking app, Bumble Bizz. It also uses a woman-first interface.

In September 2018, a "snooze" feature was added to allow users to pause activity and avoid using the app for some time.

In June 2019, Bumble introduced in-app voice and video calls. Bumble's vice president of strategy reported "an 84 percent increase in video calls that were placed between users" during the COVID-19 pandemic.

Another feature allows women to share details about their dates, including: who they're meeting, and the time and location of the meeting, with a contact for safety reasons.

=== Security vulnerabilities ===
In June 2021, Stripe software engineer Robert Heaton found a security vulnerability in Bumble that allows an attacker to obtain the exact location of its users via trilateration. Bumble fixed the vulnerability three days later and paid Heaton a bug bounty of $2,000.

In August 2024, researchers at KU Leuven in Belgium found that several dating apps, including Bumble, had vulnerabilities that would allow bad actors to obtain users' locations via trilateration.

In January 2026, Bloomberg News reported that Bumble was hit by cyberattacks, along with Crunchbase and Match Group. Bumble said the intruders did not get into its member database, accounts, direct messages or profiles.

== Advocacy ==
=== Feminism ===
Bumble has been described as a "feminist Tinder". Its founder has confirmed this identity, calling the app "100 percent feminist," although she has attempted to distance the app from Tinder in interviews. Wolfe Herd shared in an interview with Vanity Fair the concept behind the app:

"If you look at where we are in the current heteronormative rules surrounding dating, the unwritten rule puts the woman a peg under the man—the man feels the pressure to go first in a conversation, and the woman feels pressure to sit on her hands... If we can take some of the pressure off the man and put some of that encouragement in the woman's lap, I think we are taking a step in the right direction, especially in terms of really being true to feminism. I think we are the first feminist or first attempt at a feminist dating app."

In June 2016, Bumble blocked a user for sexist behavior after he had an outburst at a female user who asked him what he did for a living.

In August 2018, Bumble launched the Bumble Fund to support women-led startups. Following the testimony of Christine Blasey Ford against Brett Kavanaugh, Bumble ran the "Believe Women" ad campaign and donated to RAINN.

Bumble launched a three-year partnership with the National Domestic Violence Hotline in 2020.

=== Cyberflashing ===
Bumble was the first dating app to explicitly moderate for unsolicited nude images, known as cyberflashing. In 2019, the app launched Private Detector, a feature that uses artificial intelligence to automatically detect and blur nude images. In October 2022, Bumble released an open-source version of Private Detector model.

In 2019, Bumble pushed for passage of House Bill 2789 in Texas, a law that makes electronic transmission of sexually explicit material a punishable offense, after users of Bumble complained about receiving unsolicited nude images. Bumble influenced Virginia to pass Senate Bill 493, which prescribes civil penalties for an adult who knowingly sends another adult sexually explicit images without their consent in April 2022.

Bumble launched the #CyberFlashingIsFlashing ad campaign in the UK to support the Online Safety Act 2023, which was passed in March 2022.

In 2024, Bumble backed the CONSENT Act, a federal bill which "aims to provide protection for recipients of sexually explicit images, including images manipulated by artificial intelligence or machine learning."

=== Reproductive rights ===
In September 2021, Bumble set up a relief fund for those affected by the Texas Heartbeat Act. In response to the decision in Dobbs v. Jackson Women's Health Organization, which overturned Roe v. Wade, Bumble made additional donations to the American Civil Liberties Union of Texas and Planned Parenthood.

Bumble led an amicus brief in both Zurawski v. State of Texas (2023) and Moyle v. United States (2024), arguing in favor of reproductive rights.

== Reception ==
=== Feminist label ===
In August 2017, the neo-Nazi website The Daily Stormer encouraged its readers to harass Bumble's staff to protest the company's support of women's empowerment.

In February 2023, writer Sangeeta Singh-Kurtz wrote that "it often seems like that feminist twist is more marketing fodder than meaningful change to how our apps run our love lives."

In a 2025 interview with The New York Times, Wolfe Herd stated that she perceived Bumble as a "love company":

"I think we're just back to connection and we're back to relationships. I'm staying out of all the fodder and all the ickiness of the world and I just want to focus on love. I genuinely just want to drive a love company. That might sound cheesy and ridiculous, but that's where I'm at."

=== Lawsuits ===
In March 2018, Match Group sued Bumble, arguing that it was guilty of patent infringement and of stealing trade secrets from Tinder. In June 2020, an undisclosed settlement was reached between Match Group and Bumble to settle all litigation.

In 2018, a Californian man sued Bumble, alleging that Bumble allowing women to message first amounted to gender discrimination under the Unruh Civil Rights Act. Bumble settled the lawsuit in 2021, agreeing to introduce an update allowing men to express interest in other users through emojis.

In 2020, Bumble agreed to pay $22.5 million in a settlement over plaintiffs' claims that the company's auto-renewal processes were unfair and that it charged consumers without their consent.

In 2024, men’s rights activist Alfred Rava sued Bumble, alleging discrimination against men and perpetuating sexual stereotypes. Bumble has filed a motion to dismiss the lawsuit, as Rava has filed hundreds of frivolous lawsuits challenging gender-based policies, including ladies’ nights at bars and women-only networking events.

=== Anti-celibacy advertising ===
In May 2024, Bumble faced major backlash after launching a marketing campaign that entailed putting up billboards with captions such as: "You know full well a vow of celibacy is not the answer". Users accused the campaign of shaming women who were not sexually active. Bumble responded with a public apology, wherein the company said it would remove the ads and donate to the National Domestic Violence Hotline.

== See also ==
- Comparison of online dating services
