= Bateman's principle =

Biological principle about the differential reproductive success in males versus females

Bateman's principle, in evolutionary biology, states that the variability in reproductive success (or reproductive variance) is greater in males than in females. It was first proposed by Angus John Bateman (1919–1996), an English geneticist and botanist. The principle is based on the observation that, while males can produce millions of sperm cells with little effort, females must invest higher levels of resources in order to nurture a relatively small number of egg cells. Bateman's paradigm thus views females as the limiting factor in reproduction over which males compete in order to copulate.

Although Bateman's principle has served as a cornerstone for the study of sexual selection for many decades, it has been controversial. One study refers to the paper in which Bateman presented his ideas and experimental results as "classic, but divisive" and also describes it as presenting "concepts that remain influential and debated in sexual selection." However, some scientists have criticized Bateman's experimental and statistical methods or have produced conflicting evidence. Others have defended the validity of the principle and have produced evidence in support of it. A historical review of critiques of Bateman’s principle states that “biologists are now divided into two groups: those who praise Bateman as one of the founding fathers of the discipline of behavioural ecology, and those who claim his paper was fatally flawed.”

== History ==
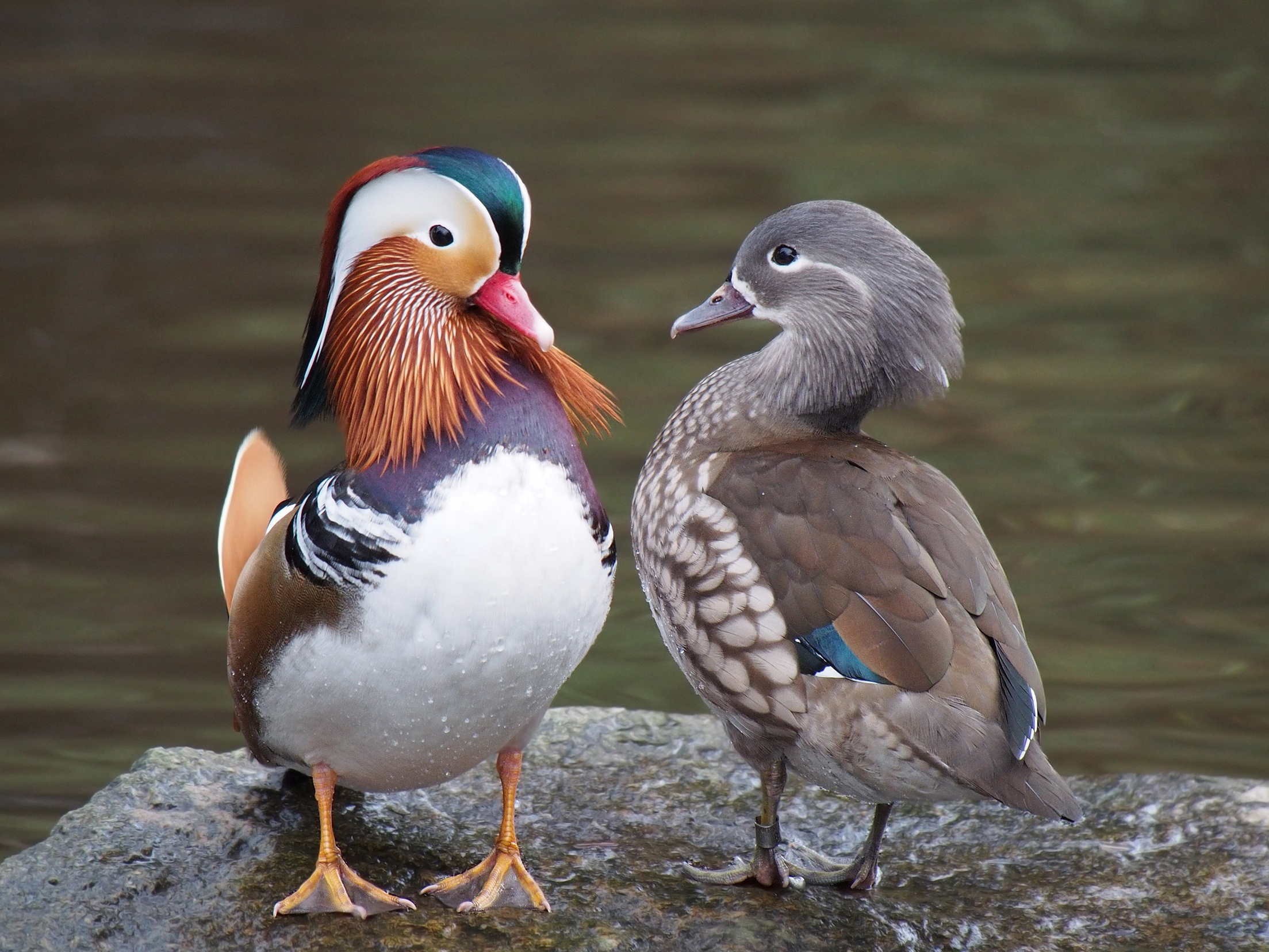
Mandarin ducks, male (left) and female (right), illustrating the dramatic difference in plumage between sexes, a manifestation of sexual dimorphism

Bateman contributed to the literature on sexual selection only once in his lifetime in a paper published in 1948. Bateman's paper was an attempt to refine Darwin's theory of sexual selection, which he saw not as flawed, but as incomplete. Darwin attributed the exaggerated attributes of some species' males (such as physical ornaments — colors, large antlers — that do not enhance odds of survival) to differential sexual selection operating on males. He attributed this development of traits that might lower survival rates to males being generally more "eager" than females to engage in sexual activity, though "he was at a loss … to explain this sex difference."

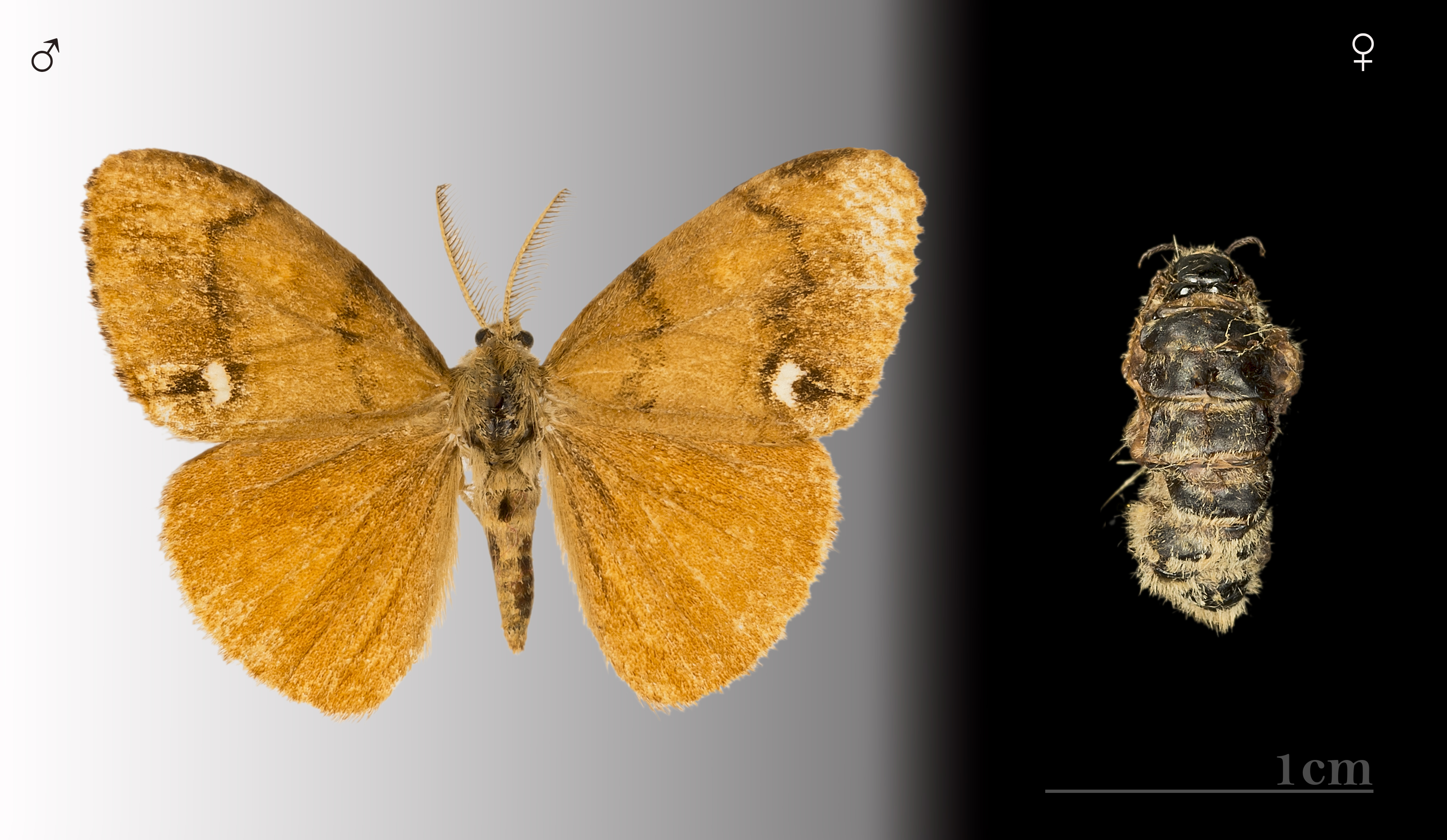
Orgyia antiqua: male with developed wings (left) and female with vestigial wings (right)

Bateman's study was an attempt to add greater scientific rigor to Darwin's original insight and to explain the different roles played by males and females in many mating systems. He did this by studying reproduction in a small population of fruit flies, Drosophila melanogaster. He felt that if he were to provide a concrete demonstration of how sexual selection played out in the reproductive success of certain species, he could refine Darwin's ideas.

Although subsequent authors have attributed a wide range of ideas to Bateman, his basic principle can be expressed in three simple statements. The first is that male reproductive success increases with the number of mates they copulate with, while female reproductive success does not. The second is that male reproductive success will show greater variance than female reproductive success. The third is that sexual selection will have a greater effect on the sex with greater variance in reproductive success.

A female lizard defending her clutch against an egg-eating snake

After publication, Bateman's paper fell into relative obscurity until interest in it was revived by Robert Trivers in a paper published in 1972. Triver's insight was that a key factor in determining in the intensity of sexual selection and sexual dimorphism across species was differences between males and females in the amount of parental investment required to produce and nurture offspring. Trivers adopted a broad definition of parental investment, which included gamete production, incubation or gestation and the parental care required to raise young offspring. Trivers theorized that sexual selection should be more intense in the sex that expends fewer resources on parental investment (which, in many species, are males).

Subsequent research in this area makes frequent reference to both Bateman and Trivers and established both as influential scientists in the field of evolutionary biology.

== Bateman's concept ==
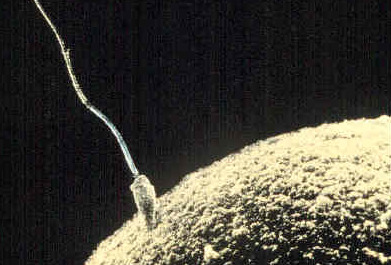
A sperm cell fertilizing an egg cell. Bateman focused on the differential resource costs of producing male versus female gametes.

The starting point for the theory underpinning Bateman's principle is the idea that, in a 'typical' species, it is the females who have to make larger investments in order to produce each offspring. In an original, but quite narrow insight, Bateman attributed the origin of the unequal investment to the differences between males and females in cost differences of gamete production: sperm are cheaper to produce than eggs, which are larger and more nutrient-rich than sperm cells. Under a schematic representation of a typical mating system, a single male can fertilize all of a female's eggs, whereas a female will not produce more offspring by mating with more than one male. A male's fertility is therefore closely related to the number of times he is able to mate with receptive females over his lifetime. In contrast, a female's potential reproductive success is limited by how many eggs she can produce (Bateman also allowed that milk production in mammals also increased reproduction costs for females).

Thus, female reproductive capacity is the scarce resource over which males must compete for access in most mating systems. According to Bateman's principle, this generally results in sexual selection, in which males compete with each other for mating opportunities, while females become choosy and prefer to mate with males that they perceive as having the most to offer in terms of improving the fitness of their offspring.

== Bateman's experiment ==
Female (left) and male (right) D. melanogaster

Bateman conducted the first experimental study comparing reproductive success in males and females in 1948. A total of six series of experiments were conducted with the fruit fly Drosophila melanogaster, using three to five individuals of each sex and a total of 215 males and 215 females for the six experiments. Each adult was heterozygous for a dominant phenotypic mutation (this allowed him to determine parentage by looking at the physical characteristics of the offspring). Each trial ran for three or four days. Bateman also varied the age of the flies depending on the experiment, with an age gap between one and six days total.

Bateman never actually counted the flies' copulations and instead formulated his results by looking at the flies' offspring. This was possible because, as noted above, the flies used were from several inbred strains, which meant both parents could be identified by their offsprings' specific inbred strain. In the absence of genetic testing, Bateman was using the only feasible technique given the technology available at the time. Bateman inferred the number of involved mates based on the number of offspring that were later found to have mutations from both a male and a female – that is, he knew the number of offspring produced by each individual fly as well as the partners with which the individual had produced these offspring. These were used as a proxy for calculating mating success of each individual fly. The difficulty with this methodology was that if a female Drosophila had copulated with five males and only one larva survived, Bateman would not be able to account for the other four copulations.

Analysis of the data collected in sets one through four showed that the males' reproductive success, estimated as the number of sired offspring, increased at a steady rate until a total of three mates was reached. Bateman kept the sex ratio of males to females completely even throughout his trials. But after surpassing three mates, male reproductive success began to fall. Female reproductive success also increased with the number of mates, but much more gradually than that of the males. The second series of data collected in sets five and six produced a dramatically different outcome. Male reproductive success increased at a steady and steep rate, never dropping. Female reproductive success, on the other hand, plateaued after a single mate.

Bateman focused mainly on the second set of data (sets five and six) when discussing his results. His conclusion was that the reproductive success of females does not increase with additional mates, as one fit mate was enough to successfully complete fertilization, whereas male reproductive success increased strongly. The is often referred to as Bateman's gradient (that is, the statistical relationship between mating success and reproductive success).

Bateman's experimental results gave rise to the following conclusions:

- The number of offspring is more variable in male fruit flies than in females.
- The number of sex partners is more variable in male fruit flies than in females.
- Some of the six series of experiments show that, for males, the number of offspring increases steadily with the number of mates, but, for females, the number of offspring reaches a plateau with only one mate.

== Criticisms of Bateman's methodology ==
In 2007, Snyder and Gowaty published an in-depth analysis of the data in Bateman's 1948 paper. They found sampling biases, mathematical errors, and selective presentation of data. In 2012 and 2013, Gowaty, Kim, and Anderson repeated Bateman's experiment in its entirety, staying as close to Bateman's published methodology as possible. They found that upon combining certain fly strains with one another, the offspring were unable to survive to adulthood. Thus, Bateman's results regarding the number of individuals not having mated was too high. This was valid for both the males and females. A further source of error is that chromosome effects caused a greater percentage of mutations in males (than in females) to be lethal before reaching sexual maturity.

Gowaty explored the reason for the premature death of the Drosophila. She began doing so by running monogamy trials between different strains of flies and found that 25% of the offspring died due to becoming double mutants. Bateman thought his work fit within the lines of Mendel's laws of genetics, while Gowaty proved otherwise. The 1948 experiments inferred reproductive success based on the number of adults living by the end of the trial. In reality, many factors were left out of the equation when calculating reproductive success as a function of the number of mates, thereby undermining the accuracy behind Bateman's results. Gowaty was not able to confirm Bateman's conclusions and found no evidence for sexual selection in the experiment.

Other analyses of Bateman's experimental design and statistical technique identified further shortcomings. Birkhead wrote a 2000 review arguing that since Bateman's experiments lasted only three to four days, the female fruit fly, Drosophila melanogaster, may not have needed to mate repeatedly, as it can store sperm for up to four days; if Bateman had used a species in which females had to copulate more often to fertilize their eggs, the results might have been different.

A 2012 review by Zuleyma Tang-Martínez concluded that various empirical and theoretical studies, especially Gowaty's inability to replicate the results of Bateman's original experiment, pose a major challenge to Bateman's conclusions, and that Bateman's principle should be considered an unproven hypothesis in need of further reexamination. According to Tang-Martínez, "modern data simply don't support most of Bateman's and Trivers's predictions and assumptions."

== Criticisms of Bateman's principle on other grounds ==
Since the renewal of interest in Bateman's principle in the 1970s, it has received considerable critical attention. Sutherland argued that males' higher variance in reproductive success may result from random mating and coincidence. Hubbell and Johnson suggested that variance in reproductive success can be greatly influenced by chance differences in lifespan and by lengths of post-mating latency (period of sexual inactivity). In 2005, Gowaty and Hubbell published a simulation study showing that variance in mating success can be due to the time available for mating as well as fitness characteristics of available mates. They argued that there are cases in which males can be more "choosy" (that is, selective) than females, whereas Bateman suggested that his paradigm of female choosiness would be "almost universal" among sexually reproducing species. Critics proposed that females might be more subject to sexual selection than males, but not in all circumstances.

== Studies supporting Bateman's principle ==
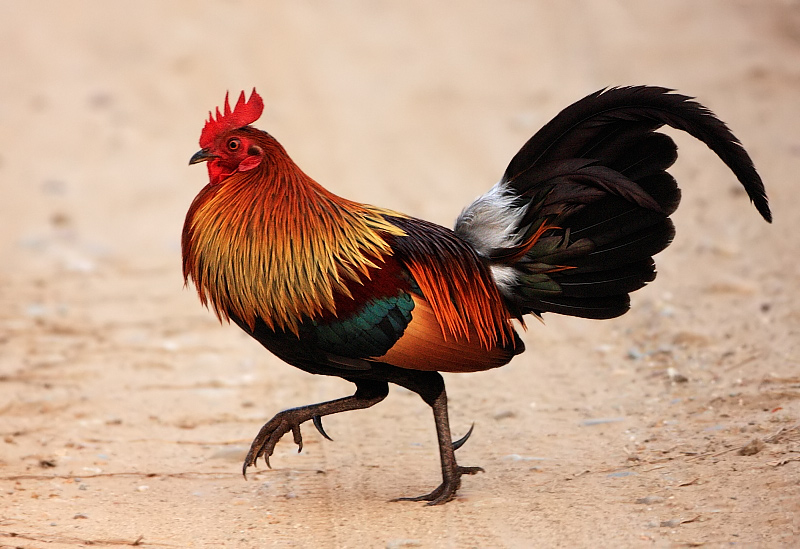
Male red junglefowl

Despite the difficulties of replicating Bateman's experimental results, support for his principle has been found in some studies examining the relationship between the number of mates and the reproductive success of males and females. Julie Collet conducted an experiment with a population of red junglefowl. A total of thirteen replicate groups of three males and four females were monitored for ten days. The results "confirmed Bateman's principle by showing that males are strongly sexually selected to remate [that is, to have numerous copulations]."^{:208} However, inferring mating success from data on genetic parentage overestimates the strength of sexual selection. The study shows that unfertilized or failed matings need to be factoredin; traditional methods of calculating the Bateman gradient (that is, univariate regressions relating only mating success to reproductive success) overestimate the value of the Bateman gradient via an omitted variable bias.

In 2013, Fritzsche and Arnqvist tested Bateman's principle by estimating sexual selection between males and females in four seed beetles. They used a unique experimental design that showed sexual selection to be greater on males than on females. In contrast, sexual selection was also shown to be stronger for females in role-reversed species. They suggested that the Bateman gradient is typically the most accurate and informative measure of sexual selection between different sexes and species.

A 2016 meta-analysis of mating systems in polygamous animals demonstrates that "across the animal kingdom, sexual selection, as captured by standard Bateman metrics, is indeed stronger in males than in females and that it is evolutionarily tied to sex biases in parental care and sexual dimorphism."

== Subsequent research on the diversity of mating systems ==
Life cycle of the seahorse - an example where males provide most of the parental care.

Far from confirming Bateman's narrow focus on cost differences of producing male and female gametes, much of the subsequent research inspired by his work sheds light on the diversity of mating and parenting systems among species with sexual reproduction. These systems vary in numerous respects, including: external fertilization versus internal fertilization; dioecy versus hermaphroditism; female promiscuity and cryptic female choice; types of investment required by species; and differences in sexual roles in terms of the amount and type of parental investment. Subsequent research has therefore presented challenges for Bateman's principle without minimizing the value of his initial contribution as a frame for further research into evolutionary biology.^{:206}

For example, some studies have documented species where parental roles were reversed. These include species such as pipefish (seahorses), phalaropes and jacanas in which the males perform most of the parental care. In these species, the females are highly ornamented and territorially aggressive, while males are 'cryptic' in the sense that they use physical and chemical means to control success of fertilization by females. In these species, the typical fundamental sex differences are reversed: females have a faster reproductive rate than males (and thus greater reproductive variance), and males have greater assurance of genetic parentage than do females. Consequently, reversals in sex roles and reproductive variance are broadly consistent with Bateman's principle, and with Robert Trivers's parental investment theory.

== See also ==
- Variability hypothesis
- Cinderella effect
- Coolidge effect
- Hypergamy
- Parental investment
- Paternal care
- Anisogamy

== Sources ==
- Ridley, Mat (2002), The Red Queen: Sex and the Evolution of Human Nature
- Baker, Robin (2003), Sperm Wars: The Science of Sex
- Bateman, A.J. (1948), "Intra-sexual selection in Drosophila", Heredity, 2 (Pt. 3): 349–368, doi:10.1038/hdy.1948.21, PMID 18103134
- Berglund, A.; Widemo, M.S.; Rosenqvist, G. (2005), "Sex-role reversal revisited: choosy females and ornamented, competitive males in a pipefish", Behavioral Ecology, 16 (3): 649–655, doi:10.1093/beheco/ari038
- Birkhead, T. (2001), Promiscuity: An Evolutionary History of Sperm Competition, Cambridge: Harvard University Press, ISBN 978-0-674-00666-9
- Brooker, MG; Rowley, I; Adams, M; Baverstock, PR (Mar 1990), "Promiscuity: An inbreeding avoidance mechanism in a socially monogamous species?", Behavioral Ecology and Sociobiology, 26 (3): 191–199, Bibcode:1990BEcoS..26..191B, doi:10.1007/BF00172086, S2CID 34870402
- Darwin, C.R. (1871), The Descent of Man and Selection in Relation to Sex, Hurst and Co
- Emlen, S.T.; Oring, L.W. (1977), "Ecology, sexual selection, and the evolution of mating systems", Science, 197 (4300): 215–223, Bibcode:1977Sci...197..215E, doi:10.1126/science.327542, PMID 327542
- Flinn, Mark (2004), "Sexual selection: monkeys, apes, and humans", Lecture notes for Anth 1500, University of Missouri-Columbia, archived from the original on 2008-01-17
- Hewett, Caspar (2003), Theory of Sexual Selection - The Human Mind and the Peacock's Tale, The Great Debate
- Huxley, J.S. (1938), "The present standing of the theory of sexual selection", in de Beer, G.R. (ed.), Evolution: Essays on aspects of evolutionary biology, Oxford: Clarendon Press, pp. 11–42
- Judson, Olivia (2002), Dr. Tatiana's Sex Advice To All Creation, New York: Metropolitan Books, ISBN 978-0-8050-6331-8
- Knight, J (Jan 2002), "Sexual stereotypes", Nature, 415 (6869): 254–7, Bibcode:2002Natur.415..254K, doi:10.1038/415254a, PMID 11796975, S2CID 4337214
- Knowlton, N. (1982), "Parental care and sex role reversal", in King's College Sociobiology Group (ed.), Current problems in sociobiology, Cambridge, UK: Cambridge University Press, ISBN 978-0-521-24203-5
- Méry, F; Joly, D (Feb 2002), "Multiple mating, sperm transfer and oviposition pattern in the giant sperm species, Drosophila bifurca", Journal of Evolutionary Biology, 15 (1): 49–56, doi:10.1046/j.1420-9101.2002.00364.x, S2CID 85151408
- Pruett-Jones, S; Tuttle, EM (Feb 2007), "Fairy-wren sperm counts: a correction", Animal Behaviour, 73 (3): e1–e2, doi:10.1016/j.anbehav.2006.10.003, S2CID 53189441
- Thornhill, Randy (2008), The Evolutionary Biology of Human Female Sexuality
- Williams, GC (1966), Adaptation and natural selection: a critique of some current evolutionary thought, Princeton, N.J: Princeton University Press, ISBN 978-0-691-07900-4
- Wolff, JO; Macdonald, DW (Mar 2004), "Promiscuous females protect their offspring", Trends in Ecology & Evolution, 19 (3): 127–33, doi:10.1016/j.tree.2003.12.009, PMID 16701243
