= Parental care in birds =

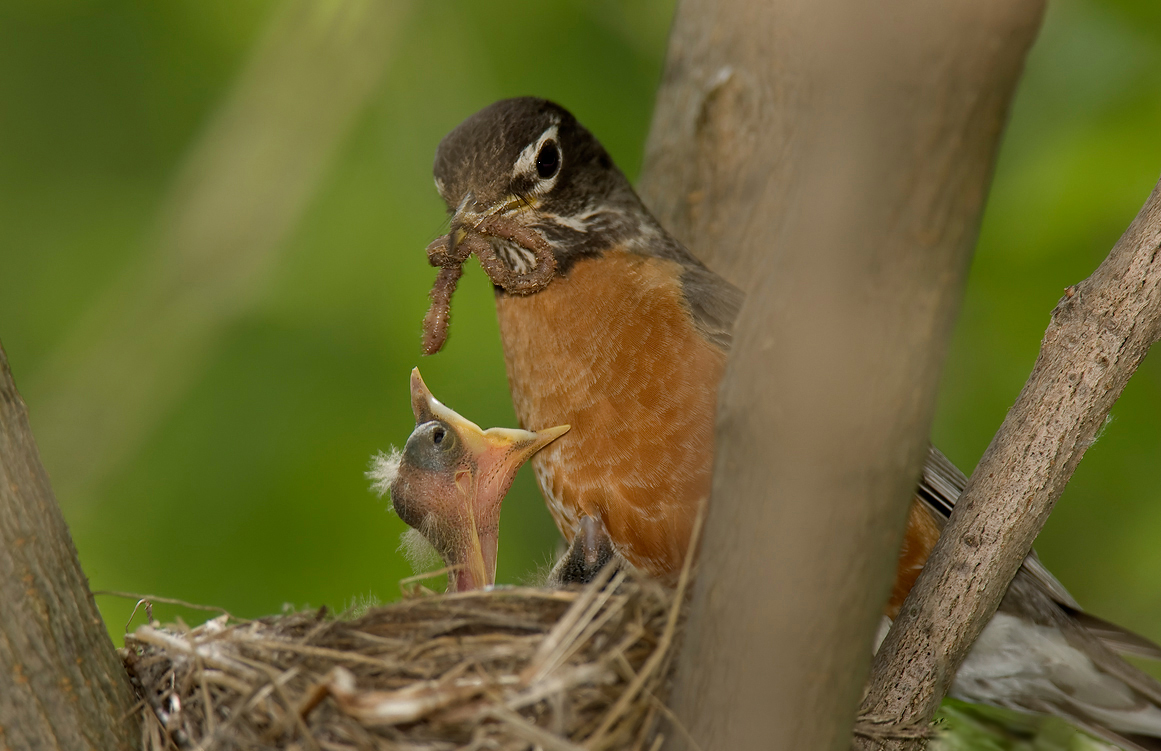
An American robin (Turdus migratorius) feeding its chick a worm.

Parental care refers to the level of investment provided by the mother and the father to ensure development and survival of their offspring. In most birds, parents invest profoundly in their offspring as a mutual effort, making a majority of them socially monogamous for the duration of the breeding season. This happens regardless of whether there is a paternal uncertainty.

== Origin ==
Birds originated from earlier theropod dinosaurs and underwent body miniaturization over a 50 million year period. Changes in anatomy are rearrangement of body mass, adults retain juvenile traits including large brain mass and eyes despite a smaller snout (paedomorphism), and aerial abilities. (Michael S. Y. Lee, Andrea Cau, Darren Naish, and Gareth J. Dyke)

The Archaeopteryx was the first fossil bird recorded with evolved feathers. The forelimb in the Archaeopteryx could have been used for parental care of offspring because enlarged feathers were possibly used to shield offspring from the suns' rays and for flight. (Carey, J.R., and Adams. J (2001)) Older potential avialans have since been identified, including Anchiornis, Xiaotingia, and Aurornis.

Kavanau (1987) was the first to find that unique bi-parental care seen in modern birds probably evolved from extinct birds. They developed the ability to provide protection, escorting, nurturing and egg guarding abilities for their young. Evolution of homeothermy and flight most likely occurred in bi-parental birds with precocial chicks. Kavanau said extant birds (David J. Varricchio) evolved and learned flight through evolution to access ground nests faster. (Kavanau)

Van Rhijn (1984, 1990), Handford and Mares (1985), and Elzanowski (1985) were the first to announce the earliest form of parental care as being mono-parental male care.

Wesolowsi (1994) contradicted Kavanau's reasoning by saying flight evolved due to parental care not reproduction as previously thought. While flight was being enhanced in evolutionary stages, lack of parental care meant that the increasing number of large eggs required a higher level of investment. This created young that were able to take flight shortly after hatching which is known as precocial, in the form of unassisted paternal (male only) care. The next stage of evolution replaced this with bi-parental care (with a few exceptions). Ligon (1999) suggested with Vehrencamp (2000) that male incubation existed first and later gave way to shared and finally female only incubation.

A possible evolutionary timeline by Kavanau suggests that basal theropod dinosaurs evolved into birds that evolved unique bi-parental care, after which avian birds evolved homeothermy and flight.

Burley and Johnson (2002), Tullberg et al. (2002), Prum (2002), and Varricchio et al. (1999) questioned the male evolutionary shift from no care to male care. They proposed like Kavanau's model that parental care came first leading to bi-parental care in extant birds.

The origin of parental care in birds is still a controversial topic today. (Tomasz Wesolowski)

== Different modes of parental care ==
=== Bi-parental care ===
Bi-parental care is the most common form in birds, especially in passerines. A mating pair equally contributes to feeding and guarding the offspring. It occurs in approximately 85% of bird species. The hatchling benefits from the mutual care at the cost of the parents' future reproductive success. Each parent tries to find a mate who will not desert the nest and has high qualities that showcase their parental skills (e.g. ornamental cues). The good parent hypothesis states that birds can invest more energy towards their own survival rate by choosing an ideal mate.

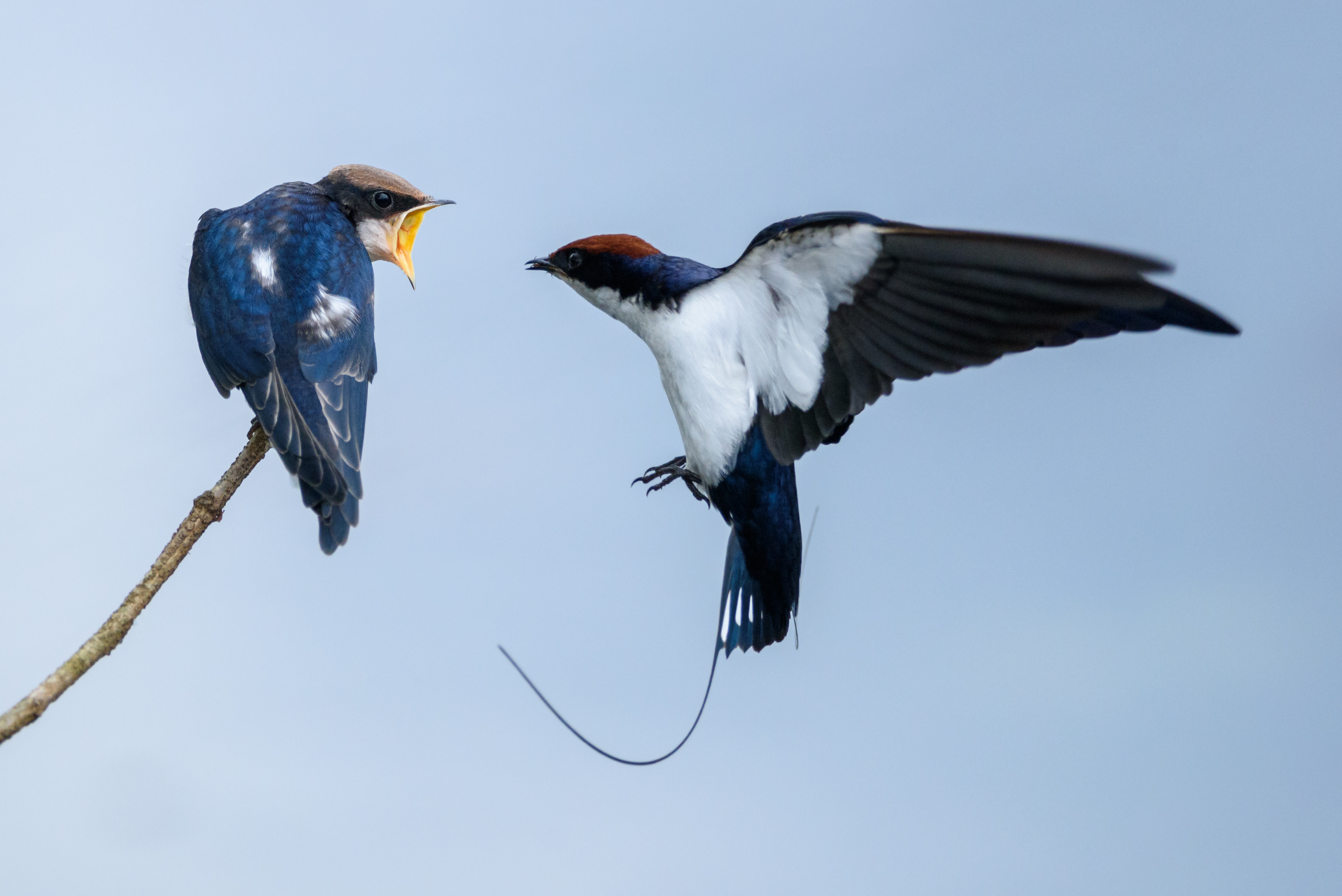
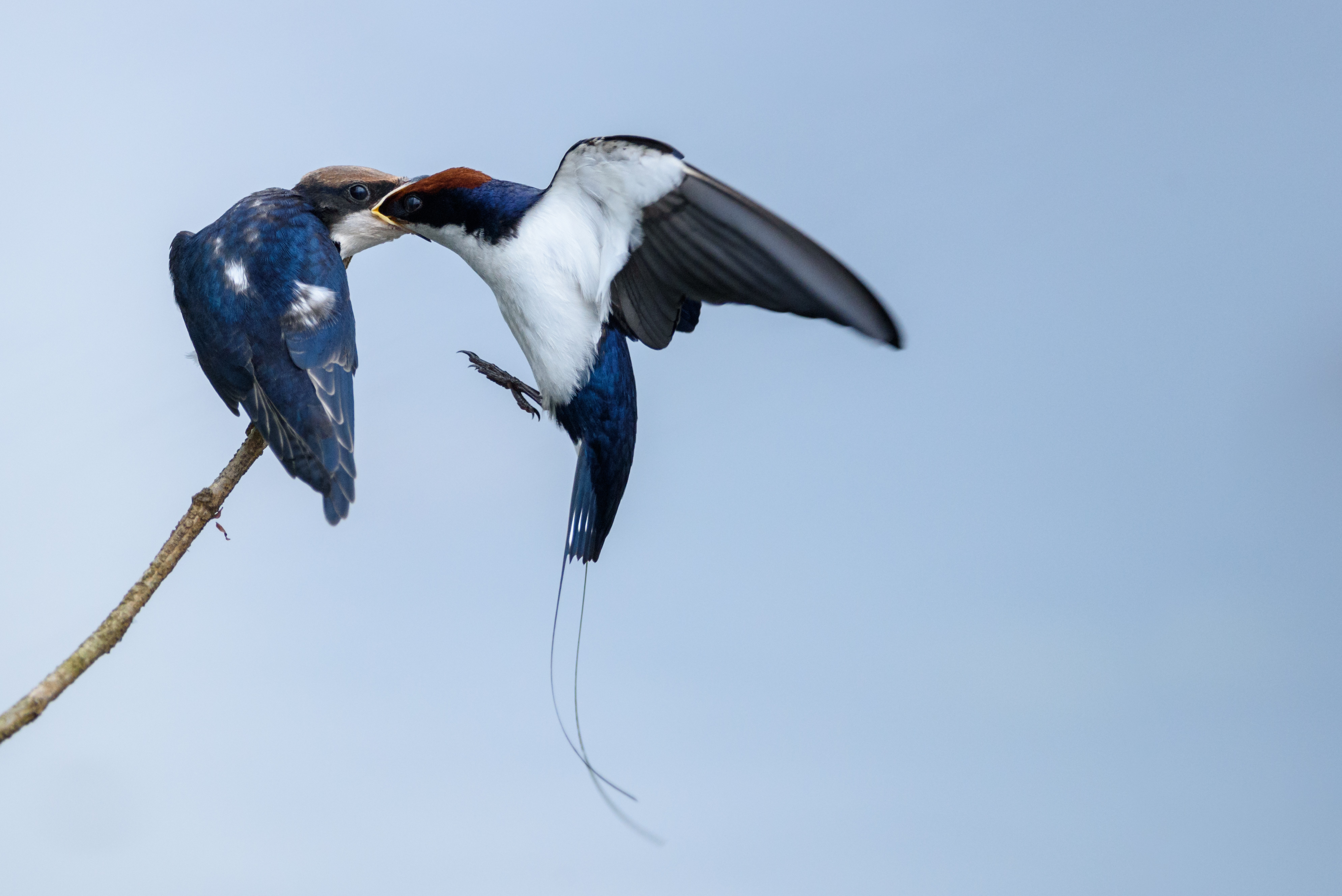
Wire-tailed swallow feeding the offspring

Evolution in potential mates to advertise their parental strengths through ornamental cues (e.g. a yellow chest patch in Iberian rock sparrows) are based on the differential allocation hypothesis. This hypothesis states that the bigger the ornamental cue a mate has, the more investment is put towards the offspring. As a result of bi-parental care, the offspring are usually stronger than birds which are only cared for by one parent in Iberian rock sparrows. (Vicente García-Navas)

==== Maternal vs paternal care ====
In bi-parental care, the male provides food and the female is a caretaker. Both ensure the survival of the offspring. The female may care for her young by covering them to keep them warm, shielding them from the sun or from rain and guarding them from predation. The male may also feed the female, who in turn regurgitates the food to the chicks. In female red-eyed vireos the roles are reversed. Nonbreeding adults or juveniles in acorn woodpeckers contribute the care through collaboration with the parents. (Paul R. Ehrlich, David S. Dobkin, and Darryl Wheye)

=== Mono-parental care ===
Male only care occurs in only 1% of bird species (approximately 90 species). Female only care occurs in 8% of species (approximately 772 species). (Andrew Cockburn) A hypothesis states that the parent that invests less reproductive effort in comparison to its mate, will have a higher chance of deserting because it loses less if successful offspring are not produced. However, in some birds (such as the snail kite found in South America, the Caribbean and Florida), the male and the female sometimes compete over which one will desert the nest regardless of which one has invested more into the reproductive effort. (Robert Trivers (1972))

=== Parental care in polyandrous species ===
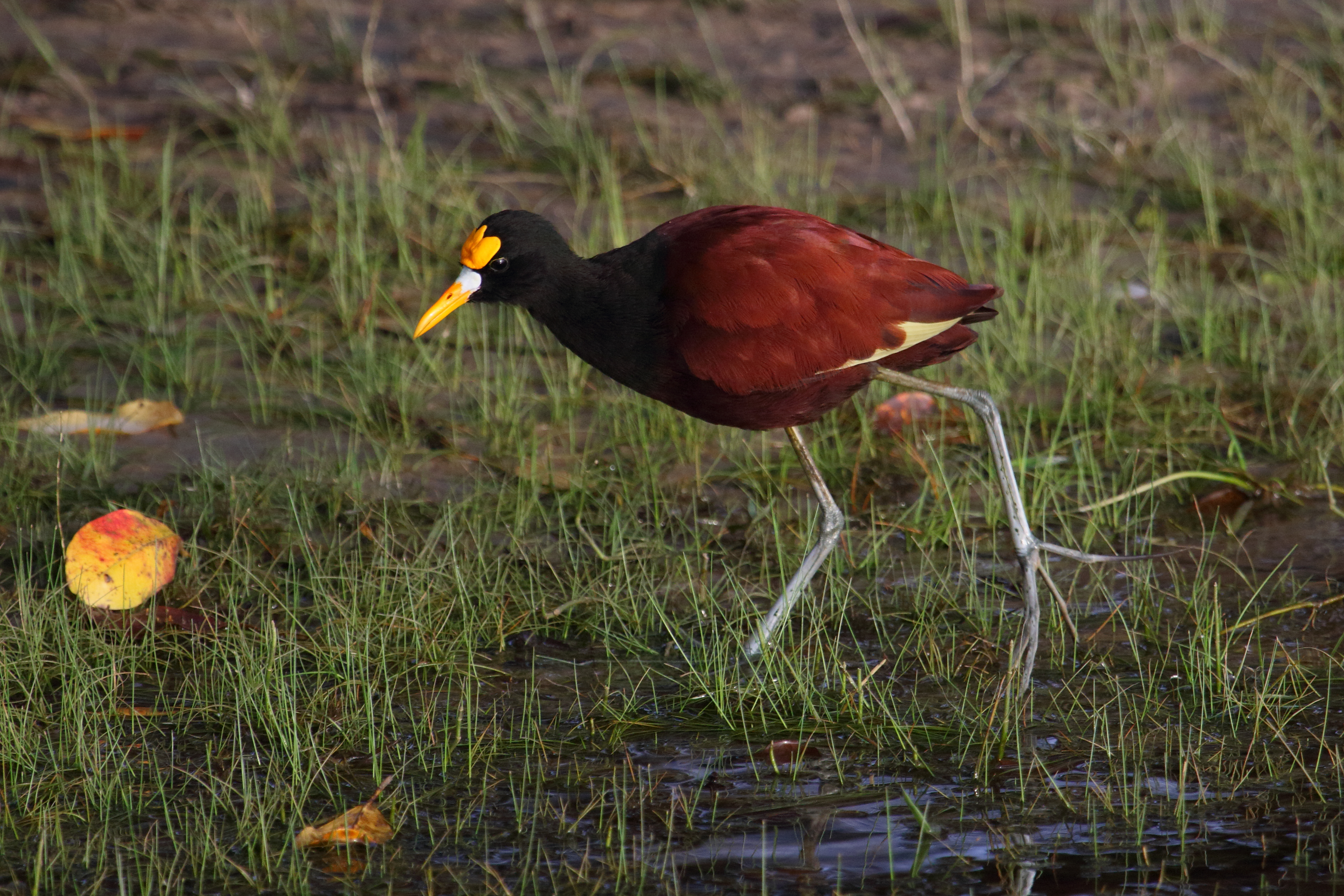
The northern jacana, a polyandrous species.

Polyandry care occurs in roughly 9% of bird species (approximately 852 species). (Andrew Cockburn) The two forms of polyandry are sequential and simultaneous polyandry. Sequential polyandry refers to the mating strategy females use in certain situations. First, they will mate with one male and raise the offspring for a short period of time. Then they will mate with another male and care for that clutch resulting in more genetic diversity and quantity of the offspring per season. Females never incubate offspring alone unless the male has been killed. Some examples of birds which practice sequential polyandry include spotted sandpipers and red-necked phalaropes. Temminck's stint, little stint, mountain plover, and sanderling share in common that the females lays a clutch of eggs and the male incubates them. Second clutches are incubated by the female herself.

In polyandry, one female mates with multiple males (and one male only mates with one female) and is a unique mating system which occurs in less than 1% of all bird species. Parental roles are reversed and cause males to provide most of the care given to offspring. Parental roles also cause a reverse in phenotypic differentiation (genetics) resulting in more colorful and larger females compared with males.

Two main types of polyandry exist: simultaneous polyandry and sequential polyandry. An even rarer subtype called cooperative simultaneous polyandry also exists in some species.

In simultaneous polyandry, the female will dominate a certain territory which contains several small nests with two or more males, who take care of the offspring. Parental roles are unique, since females compete for the males, who do most of the parental care work. Northern jacanas practice simultaneous polyandry.

The females will mate with the males in her territory, often on the same day. In return, the females will help defend the territory. No copulation occurs during the incubation period and during the first six weeks after the offspring are hatched. If the eggs are lost, the female will mate with the males once again. This can lead to competition in some species.

In cooperative simultaneous polyandry, multiple males mate with a single female and a clutch of mixed eggs (belonging to multiple males) is cared for by the whole group. Species that exhibit this behavior include certain types of Acorn woodpeckers and Harris's hawks.

In sequential polyandry (the most common form of polyandry) a female mates with a male and lays her eggs. This female then departs, leaving the male to care for the clutch while she repeats the process with another male. Species which exhibit this behavior include certain types of red and red-necked phalaropes, and spotted sandpipers which breed in South America. (Paul R. Ehrlich, David S. Dobkin, and Darryl Wheye)

== Factors affecting parental care ==
=== Ecological conditions ===
The male to female ratio has an effect on the type and amount of care provided. With an increase in available mates in some birds (such as the rock sparrow), female desertion rate increases leading to more mono-parental care. When female rock sparrows were exposed to an abundant number of male mates approximately 50% of the females deserted their first nest when the hatchlings were on average 14.3 days old. The fathers successfully took over all parental duties (Pilastro).

=== Female birds can determine the sex of their chicks ===
Female birds are able to produce more of a certain sex of birds that are more likely to survive under extreme conditions. In birds, the females' egg determines the sex of the offspring, not the male's sperm. In zebra finches, a study showed the effect of food on sex ratio production. For females, egg production is a metabolically exhausting and nourishment draining process. It was found that the sex of an egg right after it has been laid and the amount of nutrients made available to a growing embryo can be determined as well. Bigger eggs mean bigger young that have a higher survivability rate.
In a study of zebra finches, it was determined that those which were fed a lower quality diet laid eggs that were lighter and less nutrient-rich than those zebra finches which were fed a higher quality diet. Therefore, those fed a lower quality diet produced more sons, while those fed a higher quality diet produced more daughters (bigger, more nutrient-rich eggs) because, in nature, female offspring need more nourishment than males to survive and grow. Males need less nourishment because they do not lay eggs. Since zebra finches can increase the survivability rate of their species, this can be seen as a "pre-birth parental care" adaptation. (Nicholas B. Davies)

=== Timing and temperature (homeothermy) of reproduction ===
Most birds reproduce earlier if spring comes earlier. Climate change makes it difficult to notice a connection between temperature and the time of reproduction. Visser et al. (2009) has attempted to find this connection with a 6-year-long experiment in great tits (Parus major). If spring comes three weeks early, birds are more likely to reproduce earlier. This is due to earlier development of breeding plumage and other cues. Visser found this to be the case in both wild and captive birds. Higher early spring temperatures also lead to higher levels of parental care, stemming from more commitment and less chance of desertion by either parent. Because parents find mates to reproduce with earlier, this can be seen as a pre-birth parental care adaptation due to less desertion.

== Benefits and costs of parental care ==
Parental investment is any form of investment made by a parent that increases an offspring's rate of survival (reproductive success) at the expense of the parent or parent's ability to divert investment towards a new brood. The cost must yield sufficient benefits to ensure current and future breed survival. If parents invest too much parental care into the current brood their future brood will be at risk or cease to exist entirely. An ideal level of parental investment that will ensure the survival and optimal quality of both broods exists. David Lack (1958)

The brood size (number of eggs laid per clutch) is another factor which effects quality and survival rate. To increase reproductive success over a mate's lifetime a parent must spread parental investment effectively between a current and a future brood. G.C. Williams (1966)

If there is a higher level of feeding in birds such as the collared flycatchers (Ficedula albicollis), then there is an increase in parental investment during the mating season. However the reproductive success of the future brood will decrease. (Gustafsson & Sutherland, 1988) The cause might be that effort reserved for reproduction is diminished by a need to maintain the immune system this leads to a physiological condition hindering breeding. (Sheldon & Verhulst, 1996; Norris & Evans, 2000)

In most bird species, females invest in parental care more than males at the expense of reproductive success. If both parents contribute to young feeding and guarding at the same rate, the parents reproductive success increases while together. Desertion by any mate would be a setback because parental investment would be diverted to finding a new mate. A male often deserts first because internal fertilization allows the male to impregnate and leave. Males rely heavily on the quantity of offspring for reproductive success.

A hypothesis was tested in South America to see if species of birds would respond more aggressively to an adult predator (a hawk) than their Northern counterparts because they care more about future reproductive success due to a smaller brood size. On the other hand, those in North America respond more aggressively to an offspring predator (a jay) because they care more about their current brood due to a larger brood size. (Cameron Ghalambor and Thomas Martin (2001))

Often parents change the level of parental care provided to manage the cost and benefits of parental care. Passerine species in North America have a large brood size containing 4–6 offspring and a 50% adult survival rate, and those in South America have a smaller brood size containing 2–3 offspring and a 75% adult survival rate. An increase in parental investment (shown by the number of trips made) also increases the threat of predation. The number of visits decreased in the presence of predators of adult birds and predators of offspring was noted in 5 species of birds in the same study. A comparison was made between the same species in the North and South (bunting, thrush, warbler, flycatcher and the wren).

Parents can also vary parental investment to meet a current brood requirements. In 2011, the hihi (Notiomystis cincta) species were fed a sugary solution to make their mouths redder. Redder mouths acted as an ornamental cue signaling healthier offspring for a potential mate. The experiment showed that those fed the sugary solution had an increased chance to create an additional future clutch during the same mating season. (Rose Thorogood and colleagues (2011))

=== Evolutionary advantages ===
==== Female birds can alter offspring development by altering the steroids in eggs ====
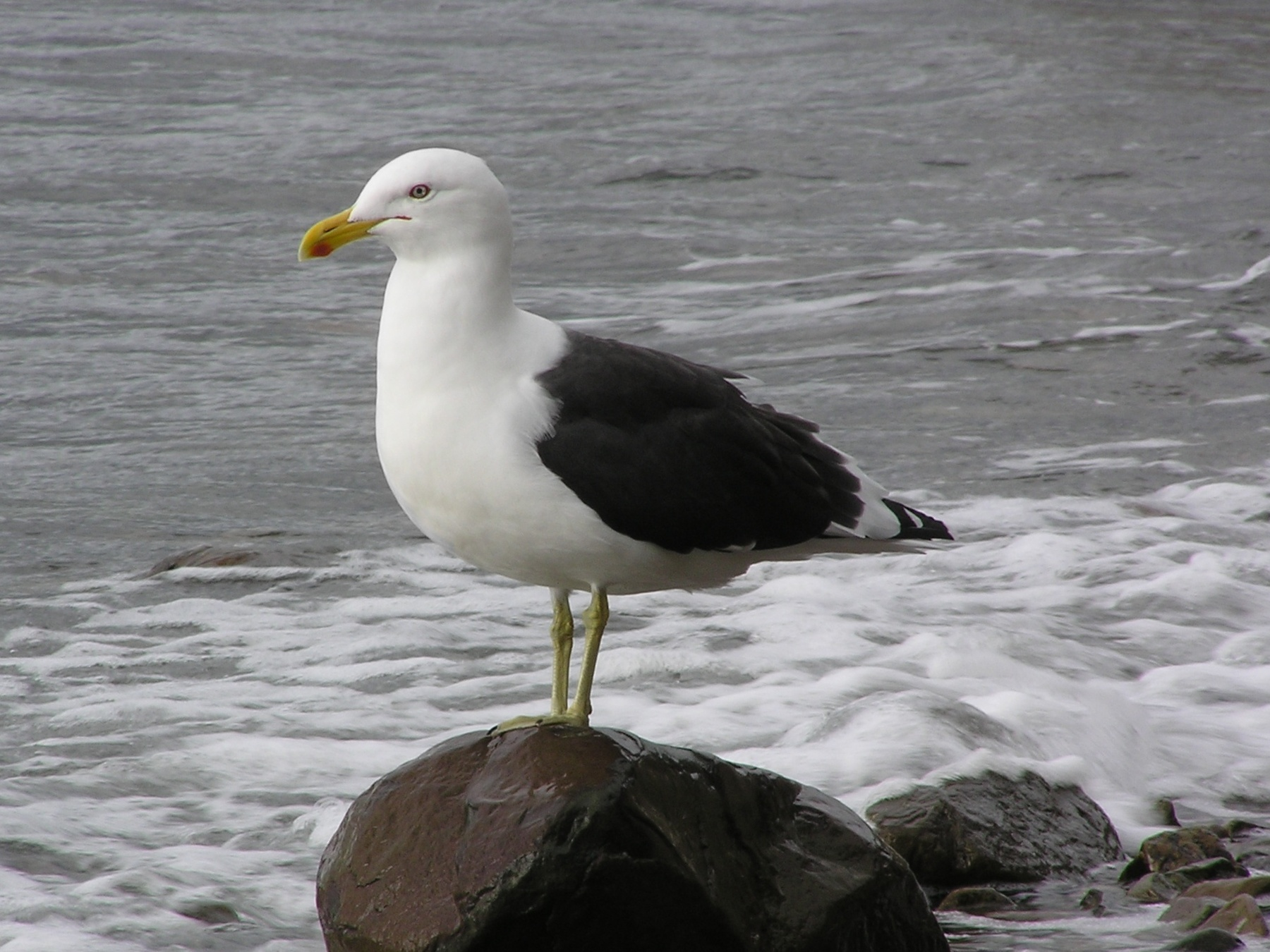
A lesser black-backed gull

In black-backed gull (Larus fuscus) females which were supplementally fed and had higher body condition produced eggs with a lower level of androgens (such as testosterone). (Verboven et al. (2003)) This suggests that females with a lower body condition (which correlates with poor conditions) presumably increase chick quality or chick survival by depositing larger quantities of androgen in their eggs. Though themselves associated with tradeoffs, yolk steroids may help compensate for hostile conditions and serve as a prenatal form of parental investment.

=== Anatomical and physiological advantages ===
Upon closer observation of the yolk in some bird eggs antibodies of mostly IgY (or IgG). The growing bird fetus uses up the yolk which contains IgY. Upon hatching, the young chick starts to create his own IgY but the mothers antibodies will still influence development and growth rate. This IgY is extremely important to avoid problems occurring from a depressed immune system. In case of surgical bursectomy of a mother bird the helper T cells which normally attack pathogens become depressed. The young birds are at risk of disease and may have a lower survival rate depending on environmental conditions (Grindstaff 2003). Carotenoids in egg yolk are responsible for the red or yellow color. They protect the underlying fetus's tissues from the free radicals in the environment. Protection against damage caused by lipids in birds is enhanced by vitamin E and other antioxidants that are infused with the carotenoids and yolk. These same antioxidants also prevent the destruction of maternal antibodies (IgY) which are extremely important to survival rate and can be seen as a form of pre-birth parental care. (Grindstaff)

== Methods of providing care ==
=== Iberian rock sparrows ===
There is a clear distinction between the roles of both parents in the Iberian rock sparrow. The female incubates the eggs for 11–14 days before they hatch. Then the female feeds the offspring while the male teaches them to fly and leave the nest, usually within 18 days of birth. The male also feeds the offspring a little less than half the time, easing the burden on the female. Rock sparrows mostly bring one food item per trip, other times guarding the nest. It was commonly observed that this species comes to the nest to guard its young when they are not bringing food, often as a tactic for deterring predators. Rock sparrows raise their heads to display their yellow patch and make a noise when guarding. (Rikón, Amanda Garcia Del)

=== Shorebirds ===
Shorebird chicks are precocial, with parents offering low parental investment, but still fulfilling offspring requirements through collaborated polygamy. Future reproductive success is dependent on changes in parental investment, where low investment results in higher mating opportunities and high investment results in lower mating opportunities (lower future reproductive success). The sexual conflict hypothesis fits both results more than the parental investment hypothesis. (Gavin H. Thomas, Tamás Székely)

== Correlation between ornamental cues and parental care ==
=== Iberian rock sparrows (Petronia petronia) ===
There is a positive correlation between ornamental cues and the parental care invested in Iberian rock sparrows (Vincente Garcia-Navas). Males show more parental effort if their female mate has a larger yellow chest patch. Also, larger nestlings were produced by males with larger yellow breast patches. There is also a connection between a larger yellow breast patch and higher parental effort, but only in the case of males. Males which mated with females with a bigger yellow breast patch had a higher rate of visiting their offspring. Bigger males bred later and fed their young more than their smaller counterparts. Larger males are not in a hurry to mate because they are in better condition and can weigh their options. (Rikón, Amanda Garcia Del)

=== Common yellowthroats (Geothlypis trichas) ===
Two pair species of common yellowthroats were analyzed from Wisconsin and New York for the effect of ornamental cues on parental care. Males possess a black face mask and yellow (breast, throat, and belly) patch which is usually completely absent in females. In both U.S. states, yellowthroat males with a larger patch had a lower parental investment towards their young however the ornament involved varied. In Wisconsin males with a larger face mask showed lower parental care and their yellow patch had no effect on parental care. In New York, males with a larger yellow patch showed lower parental care and their larger face mask had no effect on parental care. (Alonzo, Suzanne H.) Females in Wisconsin were not affected by a larger black face mask in providing parental care and likewise females in New York were not affected by yellow patch size, conflicting with the good parent hypothesis (larger ornamental cues lead to higher parental care). The trade-off hypothesis matches the results which says larger ornamental cues on males leads to less parental investment because their effort is diverted to finding more mates for future reproductive success or holding on to territories.

=== Pied flycatchers ===
Older male Pied flycatchers with large badge sizes had a harder time establishing a territory when compared with those with smaller badge sizes. However, younger males with large badge sizes which got hold of territory provided less parental care (feeding) than those with smaller badge sizes and females. Total parental investment and future reproductive success between both groups of males was unaffected, because females adjusted their parental investment to accommodate the male. Large badge size leads to an increase in male to male competition because they divert their parental investment towards showing off their badge during the mating season.

== Exceptions ==
Some birds, such as Cowbirds, rather than raise their own young, are brood parasites that force or trick another species into raising their young for them. Charles Darwin hypothesized these birds evolved from ones that did raise their own young.

== See also ==
- Mate desertion
