= Parental investment =

Parental expenditure that benefits offspring

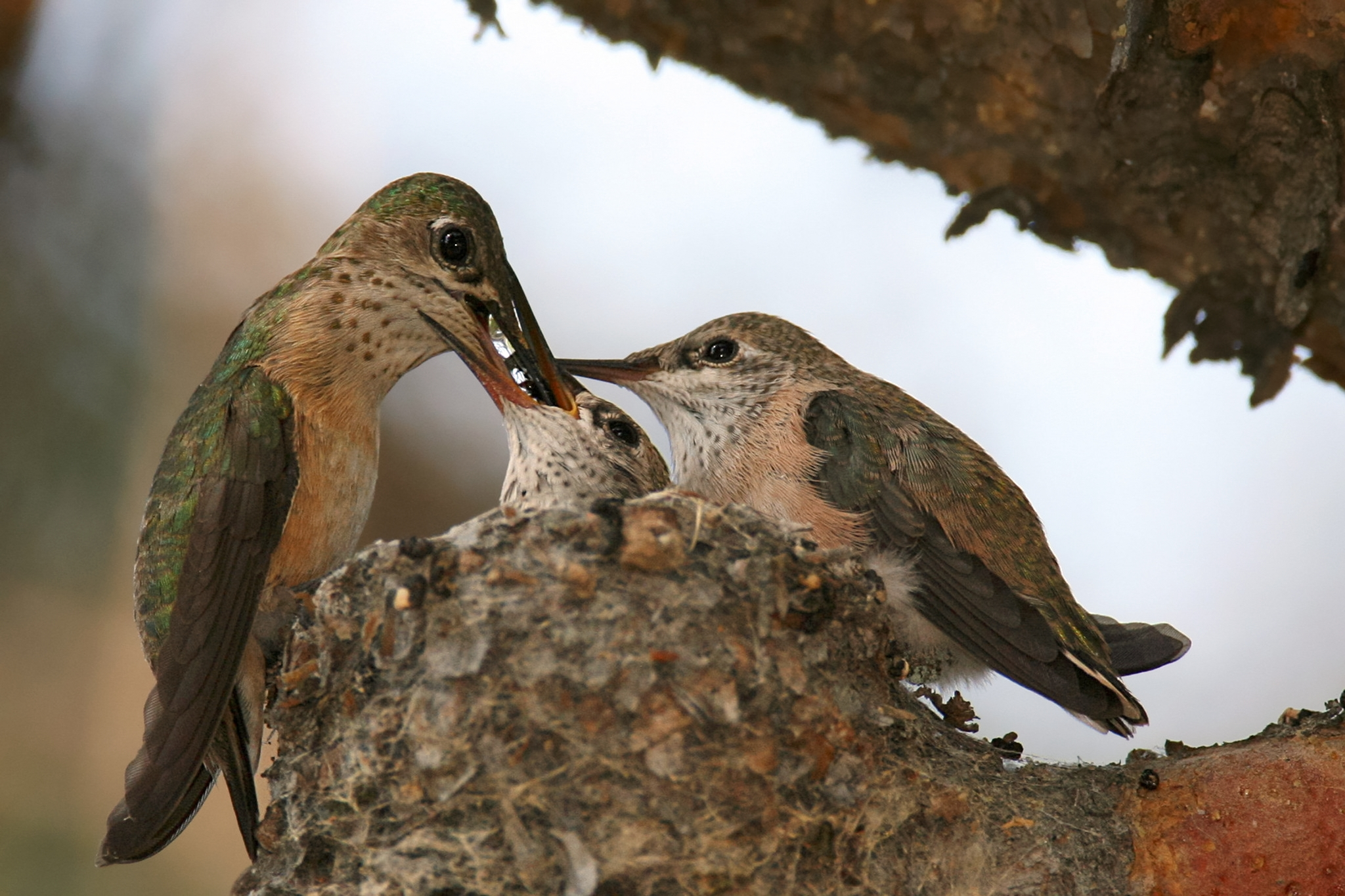
A female calliope hummingbird (Selasphorus calliope) feeding her chicks

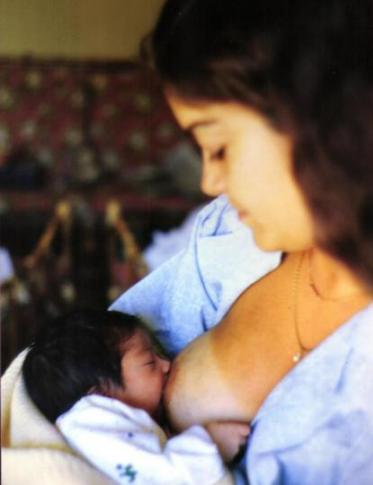
A human mother feeding her child

Parental investment, in evolutionary biology and evolutionary psychology, is any parental expenditure (e.g. time, energy, resources) that benefits offspring. Parental investment may be performed by both males and females (called biparental care), females alone (exclusive maternal care) or males alone (exclusive paternal care). Care can be provided at any stage of the offspring's life, from prenatal (e.g. egg guarding and incubation in birds, and placental nourishment in mammals) to postnatal (e.g. food provisioning and protection of offspring).

Parental investment theory, a term coined by Robert Trivers in 1972, predicts that the sex that invests more in its offspring will be more selective when choosing a mate, and the less-invested sex will have intra-sexual competition for access to mates. This theory has been influential in explaining sex differences in sexual selection and mate preferences throughout the animal kingdom and in humans.

== History ==
Sexual selection is an evolutionary concept that has been used to explain why in some species males and females behave differently in selecting mates. In 1930, Ronald Fisher wrote The Genetical Theory of Natural Selection, in which he introduced the modern concept of parental investment, introduced the sexy son hypothesis, and introduced Fisher's principle.

In 1948, Angus John Bateman published an influential study of fruit flies in which he concluded that because female gametes are more costly to produce than male gametes, the reproductive success of females was limited by the ability to produce ovum, and the reproductive success of males was limited by access to females. In 1972, Robert Trivers continued this line of thinking with his proposal of parental investment theory, which describes how parental investment affects sexual behavior. He concluded that whichever sex has higher parental investment will be more selective when choosing a mate, while the sex with lower investment will compete intra-sexually for mating opportunities. In 1974, Trivers extended parental investment theory to explain parent–offspring conflict, the conflict between the amount of investment that is optimal from the parent's perspective, versus from the offspring's perspective.

== Parental care ==
Parental investment theory is a branch of life history theory. The earliest consideration of parental investment is given by Ronald Fisher in his 1930 book The Genetical Theory of Natural Selection, wherein Fisher argued that parental expenditure on both sexes of offspring should be equal. Clutton-Brock expanded the concept of parental investment to include costs to any other component of parental fitness.

Male dunnocks (Prunella modularis) tend to not discriminate between their own young and those of another male in polyandrous or polygynandrous systems. They increase their own reproductive success through feeding the offspring in relation to their own access to the female throughout the mating period, which is generally a good predictor of paternity. This indiscriminate parental care by males is also observed in redlip blennies (Ophioblennius atlanticus).

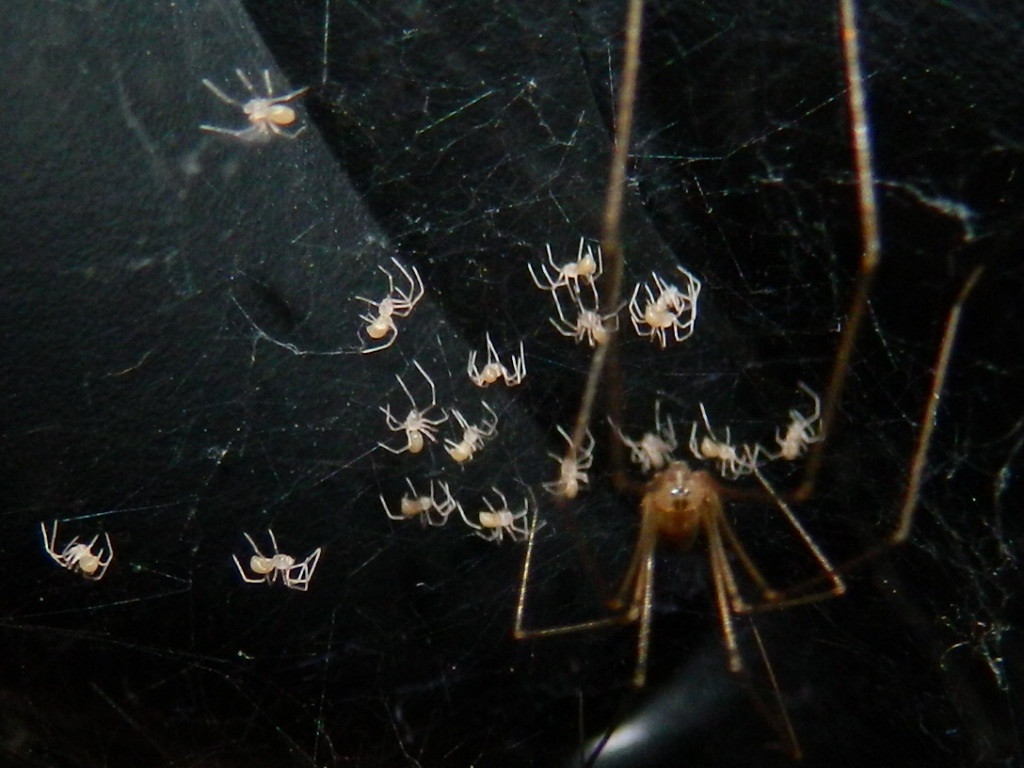
A cellar spider (Pholcidae) defending spiderlings

In some insects, male parental investment is given in the form of a nuptial gift. For instance, ornate moth (Utetheisa ornatrix) females receive a spermatophore containing nutrients, sperm and defensive toxins from the male during copulation. This gift, which can account for up to 10% of the male's body mass, constitutes the total parental investment the male provides.

In some species, such as humans and many birds, the offspring are altricial and unable to fend for themselves for an extended period of time after birth. In these species, males invest more in their offspring than do the male parents of precocial species, since reproductive success would otherwise suffer.

A female lizard defending her clutch against an egg-eating snake

The benefits of parental investment to the offspring are large and associated with the effects on condition, growth, survival, and ultimately the reproductive success of the offspring. For example, in the blunthead cichlid (Tropheus moorii) a female has very high parental investment in her young because she mouthbroods the young and while mouthbrooding, all nourishment she takes in goes to feed the young, effectively starving the mother. In doing so, however, the young are larger, heavier, and faster than they would have been without the parental care. These benefits are very advantageous since it lowers their risk of being eaten by predators and size is usually the determining factor in conflicts over resources. However, such benefits can come at the cost of parent's ability to reproduce in the future e.g., through increased risk of injury when defending offspring against predators, loss of mating opportunities whilst rearing offspring, and an increase in the time interval until the next reproduction.

A special case of parental investment is when young require nourishment and protection, but the genetic parents do not actually contribute in the effort to raise their own offspring. For example, in buff-tailed bumblebee (Bombus terrestris), oftentimes sterile female workers will not reproduce on their own, but will raise their mother's brood instead. This is common in social Hymenoptera insects due to haplodiploidy, whereby males are haploid and females are diploid. This ensures that sisters are more related to each other than they ever would be to their own offspring, incentivizing them to help raise their mother's young over their own.

Overall, parents are selected to maximize the difference between the benefits and the costs, and parental care will be likely to evolve when the benefits exceed the costs.

== Parent-offspring conflict ==
Reproduction is costly. Individuals are limited in the degree to which they can devote time and resources to producing and raising their young, and such expenditure may also be detrimental to their future condition, survival, and further reproductive output. However, such expenditure is typically beneficial to the offspring, since it enhances their condition, survival, and reproductive success. These differences may lead to parent-offspring conflict. Parents are naturally selected to maximize the difference between the benefits and the costs, and parental care will tend to exist when the benefits are substantially greater than the costs.

Parents are equally related to all offspring, and so in order to optimize their fitness and chance of reproducing their genes, they should distribute their investment equally among current and future offspring. However, any single offspring is more related to themselves (they have 100% of their DNA in common with themselves) than they are to their siblings (siblings usually share 50% of their DNA), so it is best for the offspring's fitness if the parent(s) invest more in them. To optimize fitness, a parent would want to invest in each offspring equally, but each offspring would want a larger share of parental investment. The parent is selected to invest in the offspring up until the point at which investing in the current offspring is costlier than investing in future offspring.

In iteroparous species, where individuals may go through several reproductive bouts during their lifetime, a tradeoff may exist between investment in current offspring and future reproduction. Parents need to balance their offspring's demands against their own self-maintenance. This potential negative effect of parental care was explicitly formalized by Trivers in 1972, who originally defined the term parental investment to mean "any investment by the parent in an individual offspring that increases the offspring's chance of surviving (and hence reproductive success) at the cost of the parent's ability to invest in other offspring".

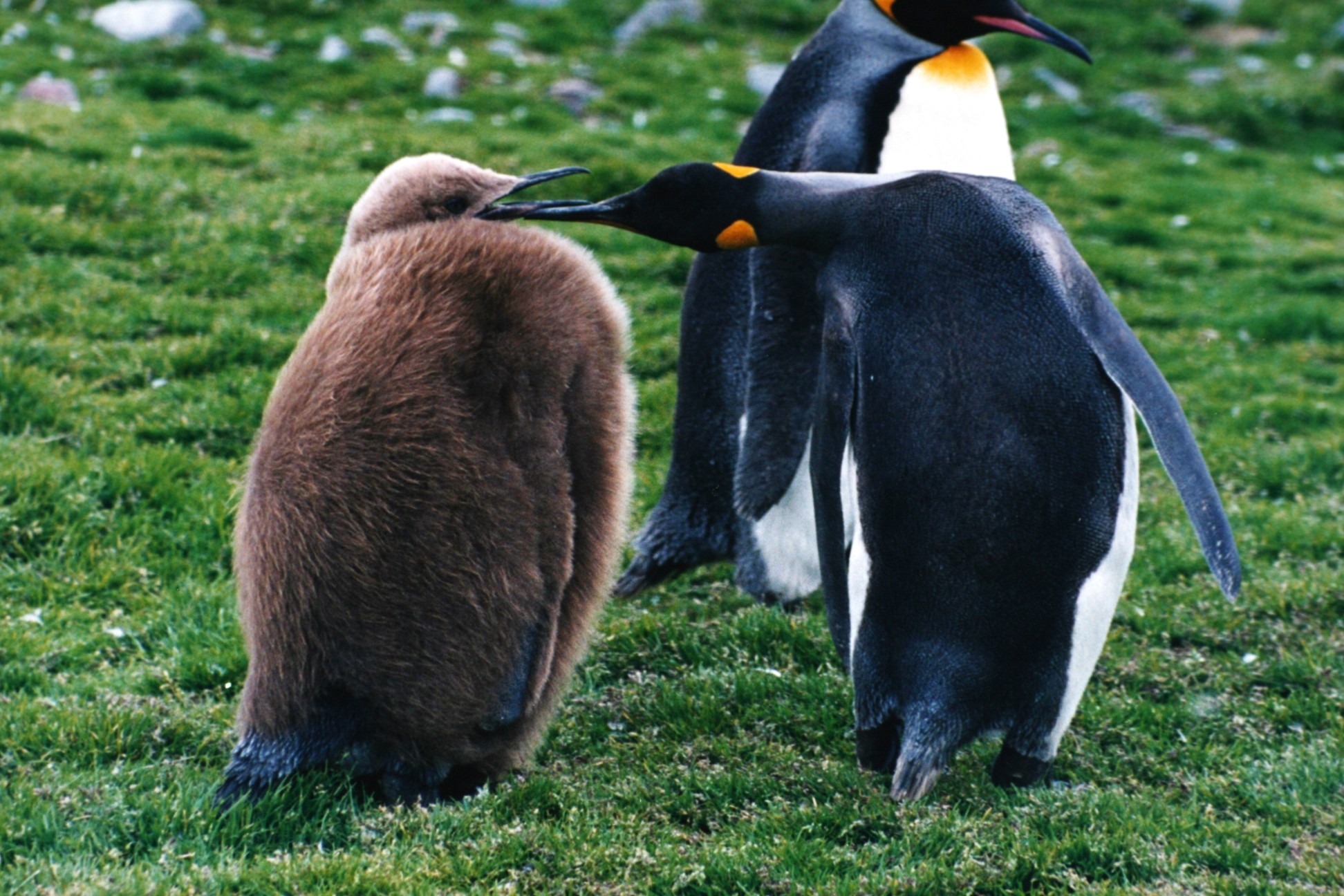
King penguin (Aptenodytes patagonicus) and a chick

Penguins are a prime example of a species that drastically sacrifices their own health and well-being in exchange for the survival of their offspring. Their parental behavior, one that does not necessarily benefit the individual, but the genetic code from which the individual arises, can be seen in the king penguin (Aptenodytes patagonicus). Although some animals do exhibit altruistic behaviors towards individuals that are not of direct relation, many of these behaviors appear mostly in parent-offspring relationships. While breeding, males remain in a fasting-period at the breeding site for five weeks, waiting for the female to return for her own incubation shift. However, during this time period, males may decide to abandon their egg if the female is delayed in her return to the breeding grounds.

It shows that these penguins initially exhibit a trade-off of their own health, in hopes of increasing the survivorship of their egg. But there comes the cost for the male penguin costs outweigh successful raising the young. Olof Olsson investigated the correlation between how many experiences in breeding an individual has and the duration an individual will wait until abandoning his egg. He proposed that the more experienced the individual, the better that individual will be at replenishing his exhausted body reserves, allowing him to remain at the egg for a longer period of time.

The males' sacrifice of their body weight and possible survivorship, in order to increase their offspring's chance of survival is a trade-off between current reproductive success and the parents' future survival. This trade-off makes sense with other examples of kin-based altruism and is a clear example of the use of altruism in an attempt to increase overall fitness of an individual's genetic material at the expense of the individual's future survival.

=== Maternal-offspring conflict in investment ===
The maternal-offspring conflict has also been studied in animals species and humans. One such case has been documented in the mid-1970s by ethologist Wulf Schiefenhövel. Eipo women of West New Guinea engage in a cultural practice in which they give birth just outside the village. Following the birth of their child, each woman weighed whether or not she should keep the child or leave the child in the nearby brush (leading to the death of the child). Likelihood of survival and availability of resources within the village were factors that played into this decision of whether or not to keep the baby. During one illustrated birth, the mother felt the child was too ill and would not survive, so she wrapped the child up, preparing to leave the child in the brush; however, upon seeing the child moving, the mother unwrapped the child and brought it into the village, demonstrating a shift of life and death. This conflict between the mother and the child resulted in detachment behaviors in Brazil, seen in Scheper-Hughes work as "many Alto babies remain[ed] not only unchristened but unnamed until they begin to walk or talk", or if a medical crisis arose and the baby needed an emergency baptism. This conflict between survival, both emotional and physical, prompted a shift in cultural practices, thus resulting in new forms of investment from the mother towards the child.

=== Alloparental care ===
Alloparental care also referred to as 'Allomothering,' is when a member of a community, apart from the biological parents of the infant, partake in offspring care provision. A range of behaviors fall under the term alloparental care, some of which are: carrying, feeding, watching over, protecting, and grooming. Through alloparental care stress on parents, especially the mother, can be reduced, therefore reducing the negative effects of the parent-offspring conflict on the mother. The apparent altruistic nature of the behavior may seem at odds with Darwin's theory of natural selection, as taking care of offspring which are not one's own would not increase one's direct fitness, while taking time, energy and resources away from raising one's own offspring. However, the behavior can be explained evolutionarily as increasing indirect fitness, as the offspring is likely to be non-descendent kin, therefore carrying some of the genetics of the alloparent.

== Offspring and situation direction ==
Parental investment behavior enhances the chances of survival of offspring, and it does not require underlying mechanisms to be compatible with empathy applicable to adults, or situations involving unrelated offspring, and it does not require the offspring to reciprocate the altruistic behavior in any way. Parentally investing individuals are not more vulnerable to being exploited by other adults.

== Trivers' parental investment theory ==
Parental investment as defined by Robert Trivers in 1972 is the investment in offspring by the parent that increases the offspring's chances of surviving and hence reproductive success at the expense of the parent's ability to invest in other offspring. A large parental investment largely decreases the parents' chances of investing in other offspring. Parental investment can be split into two main categories: mating investment and rearing investment. Mating investment consist of the sexual act and the sex cells invested. The rearing investment is the time and energy expended to raise the offspring after conception. In most species, the female's parental investment in both mating and rearing efforts greatly surpasses that of the male. In terms of sex cells (egg and sperms cells), the female's investment is typically a larger portion of both genetic material and overall virility, while typically males produce thousands of sperm cells on a daily basis. Trivers' believed that this theory explained sexual jealousy. A criticism of the theory comes from Thornhill and Palmer's analysis of it in A Natural History of Rape: Biological Bases of Sexual Coercion, as it seems to rationalize rape and sexual coercion. Thornhill and Palmer claimed rape is an evolved technique for obtaining mates in an environment where women choose mates. As PIT claims males seek to copulate with as many fertile females as possible, the choice women have could result in a negative effect on the male's reproductive success. If women did not choose their mates, Thornhill and Palmer claim there would be no rape. This ignores a variety of sociocultural factors, such as the fact that not only fertile females are raped; 34% of underage rape victims are under 12, which means they are not of fertile age, thus there is no evolutionary advantage in raping them. 14% of rapes in England are committed on males, who cannot increase a man's reproductive success as there will be no conception. Trivers' theory does not account for women having short-term relationships such as one-night stands, and that not all men behave promiscuously. An alternative explanation to parental investment theory and mate preferences would be Buss and Schmitt's sexual strategies theory.

=== Human parental investment ===
Human women have a fixed supply of around 400 ova, while sperm cells in men are supplied at a rate of twelve million per hour. Also, fertilization and gestation occur in women, investments which outweigh the man's investment of a single effective sperm cell. Furthermore, for women, one act of sexual intercourse could result in a 38-week commitment of human gestation and subsequent commitments related to rearing, such as breastfeeding. From Trivers' theory of parental investment, several implications follow. The first implication is that women are often but not always the more investing sex. The fact that they are often the more investing sex leads to the second implication that evolution favors females who are more selective of their mates to ensure that intercourse would not result in unnecessary or wasteful costs. The third implication is that because women invest more and are essential for the reproductive success of their offspring, they are a valuable resource for men; as a result, males often compete for sexual access to females.

=== Males as the more investing sex ===
For many species the only type of male investment received is that of sex cells. In those terms, the female investment greatly exceeds that of male investment, as previously noted. However, there are other ways in which males invest in their offspring. For example, the male can find food as in the example of balloon flies. He may find a safe environment for the female to feed or lay her eggs as exemplified in many birds.

He may also protect the young and provide them with opportunities to learn as young, as is the case with many wolves. Overall, the main role that males overtake is that of protection of the female and their young. That often can decrease the discrepancy of investment caused by the initial investment of sex cells. There are some species such as the Mormon cricket (Anabrus simplex), pipefish (Syngnathinae), and Panamanian poison arrow frog males invest more. Among the species where the male invests more, the male is also the pickier sex, placing higher demands on females. For example, the female that they often choose usually contain 60% more eggs than rejected females.

=== International politics ===
Parental investment theory is not only used to explain evolutionary phenomena and human behavior but describes recurrences in international politics as well. Specifically, parental investment is referred to when describing competitive behaviors between states and determining aggressive nature of foreign policies. The parental investment hypothesis states that the size of coalitions and the physical strengths of its male members determines whether its activities with its foreign neighbors are aggressive or amiable. According to Trivers, men have had relatively low parental investments, and were therefore forced into fiercer competitive situations over limited reproductive resources. Sexual selection naturally took place and men have evolved to address its unique reproductive problems. Among other adaptations, men's psychology has also developed to directly aid men in such intra-sexual competition.

One essential psychological developments involved decision-making of whether to take flight or actively engage in warfare with another rivalry group. The two main factors that men referred to in such situations were (1) whether the coalition they are a part of is larger than its opposition and (2) whether the men in their coalition have greater physical strength than the other. The male psychology conveyed in the ancient past has been passed on to modern times causing men to partly think and behave as they have during ancestral wars. According to this theory, leaders of international politics were not an exception. For example, the United States expected to win the Vietnam War due to its greater military capacity when compared to its enemies. Yet victory, according to the traditional rule of greater coalition size, did not come about because the U.S. did not take enough consideration to other factors, such as the perseverance of the local population.

The parental investment hypothesis contends that male physical strength of a coalition still determines the aggressiveness of modern conflicts between states. While this idea may seem unreasonable upon considering that male physical strength is one of the least determining aspects of today's warfare, human psychology has nevertheless evolved to operate on this basis. Moreover, although it may seem that mate seeking motivation is no longer a determinant, in modern wars sexuality, such as rape, is undeniably evident in conflicts even to this day.

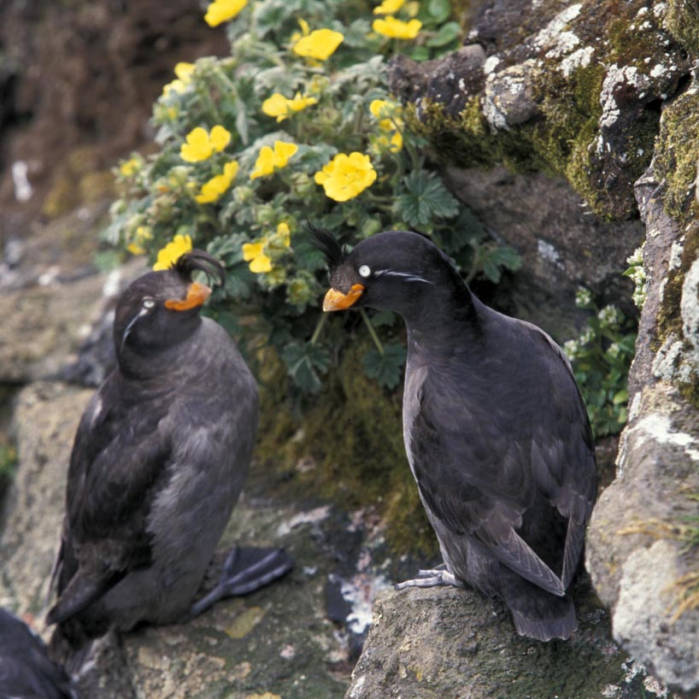
Pair of crested auklets (Aethia cristatella)

== Sexual selection ==
In many species, males can produce a larger number of offspring over the course of their lives by minimizing parental investment in favor of investing time impregnating any reproductive-age female who is fertile. In contrast, a female can have a much smaller number of offspring during her reproductive life, partly due to higher obligate parental investment. Females will be more selective ("choosy") of mates than males will be, choosing males with good fitness (e.g., genes, high status, resources, etc.), so as to help offset any lack of direct parental investment from the male, and therefore increase reproductive success. Robert Trivers' theory of parental investment predicts that the sex making the largest investment in lactation, nurturing, and protecting offspring will be more discriminating in mating; and that the sex that invests less in offspring will compete via intrasexual selection for access to the higher-investing sex (see Bateman's principle).

In species where both sexes invest highly in parental care, mutual choosiness is expected to arise. An example of this is seen in crested auklets (Aethia cristatella), where parents share equal responsibility in incubating their single egg and raising the chick. In crested auklets, both sexes are ornamented.

== Parental investment in humans ==
Humans have evolved increasing levels of parental investment, both biologically and behaviorally. The fetus requires high investment from the mother, and the altricial newborn requires high investment from a community. Species whose newborn young are unable to move on their own and require parental care have a high degree of altriciality. Human children are born unable to care for themselves and require additional parental investment post-birth in order to survive.

=== Maternal investment ===
Trivers (1972) hypothesized that greater biologically obligated investment will predict greater voluntary investment. Mothers invest an impressive amount in their children before they are even born. The time and nutrients required to develop the fetus, and the risks associated with both giving these nutrients and undergoing childbirth, are a sizable investment. To ensure that this investment is not for nothing, mothers are likely to invest in their children after they are born, to be sure that they survive and are successful. Relative to most other species, human mothers give more resources to their offspring at a higher risk to their own health, even before the child is born. This is associated with the evolution of a slower life history, in which fewer, larger offspring are born after longer intervals, requiring increased parental investment.

The placenta attaches to the uterine wall, and the umbilical cord connects it to the fetus.

The developing human fetus––and especially the brain––requires nutrients to grow. In the later weeks of gestation, the fetus requires increasing nutrients as the growth of the brain increases. Rodents and primates have the most invasive placenta phenotype, the hemochorial placenta, in which the chorion erodes the uterine epithelium and has direct contact with maternal blood. The other placental phenotypes are separated from the maternal bloodstream by at least one layer of tissue. The more invasive placenta allows for a more efficient transfer of nutrients between the mother and fetus, but it comes with risks as well. The fetus is able to release hormones directly into the mother's bloodstream to "demand" increased resources. This can result in health problems for the mother, such as pre-eclampsia. During childbirth, the detachment of the placental chorion can cause excessive bleeding.

The obstetrical dilemma also makes birth more difficult and results in increased maternal investment. Humans have evolved both bipedalism and large brain size. The evolution of bipedalism altered the shape of the pelvis, and shrunk the birth canal at the same time brains were evolving to be larger. The decreasing birth canal size meant that babies are born earlier in development, when they have smaller brains. Humans give birth to babies with brains 25% developed, while other primates give birth to offspring with brains 45-50% developed. A second possible explanation for the early birth in humans is the energy required to grow and sustain a larger brain. Supporting a larger brain gestationally requires energy the mother may be unable to invest.

The obstetrical dilemma makes birth challenging, and a distinguishing trait of humans is the need for assistance during childbirth. The altered shape of the bipedal pelvis requires that babies leave the birth canal facing away from the mother, contrary to all other primate species. This makes it more difficult for the mother to clear the baby's breathing passageways, to make sure the umbilical cord is not wrapped around the neck, and to pull the baby free without bending its body the wrong way.

The human need to have a birth attendant also requires sociality. In order to guarantee the presence of a birth attendant, humans must aggregate in groups. It has been controversially claimed that humans have eusociality, like ants and bees, in which there is relatively high parental investment, cooperative care of young, and division of labor. It is unclear which evolved first; sociality, bipedalism, or birth attendance. Bonobos, our closest living relatives alongside chimpanzees, have high female sociality and births among bonobos are also social events. Sociality may have been a prerequisite for birth attendance, and bipedalism and birth attendance could have evolved as long as five million years ago.

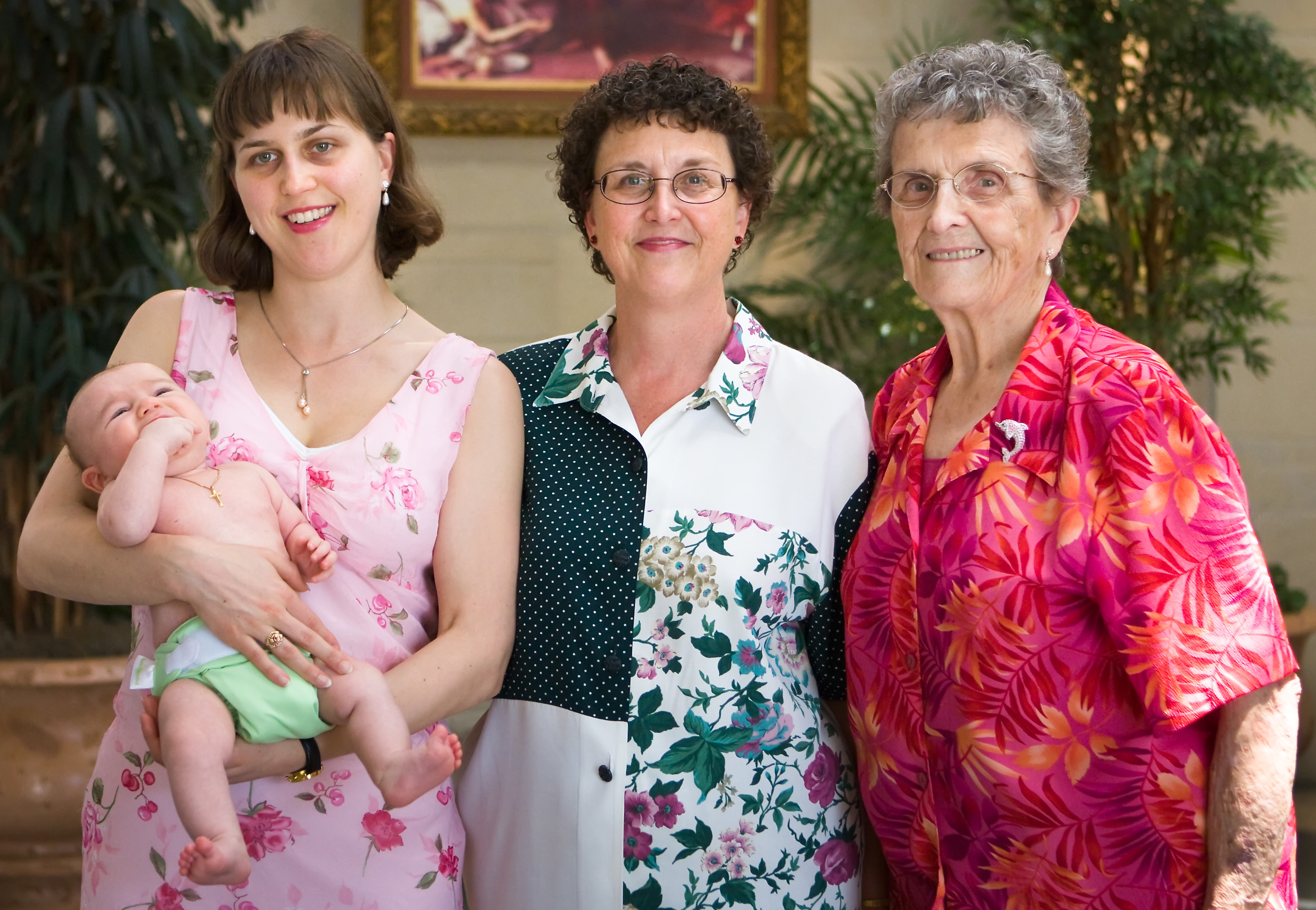
A baby, mother, grandmother, and great-grandmother. In humans, grandparents often help to raise a child.

As female primates age, their ability to reproduce decreases. The grandmother hypothesis describes the evolution of menopause, which may or may not be unique to humans among primates. As women age, the costs of investing in additional reproduction increase and the benefits decrease. At menopause, it is more beneficial to stop reproduction and begin investing in grandchildren. Grandmothers are certain of their genetic relation to their grandchildren, especially the children of their daughters, because maternal certainty of their own children is high, and their daughters are certain of their maternity to their children as well. It has also been theorized that grandmothers preferentially invest in the daughters of their daughters because X chromosomes carry more DNA and their granddaughters are most closely related to them.

=== Paternal investment ===
As altriciality increased, investment from individuals other than the mother became more necessary. High sociality meant that female relatives were present to help the mother, but paternal investment increased as well. Paternal investment increases as it becomes more difficult to have additional children, and as the effects of investment on offspring fitness increase.

Men are more likely than women to give no parental investment to their children, and the children of low-investing fathers are more likely to give less parental investment to their own children. Father absence is a risk factor for both early sexual activity and teenage pregnancy. Father absence raises children's stress levels, which are linked to earlier onset of sexual activity and increased short-term mating orientation. Daughters of absent fathers are more likely to seek short-term partners, and one theory explains this as a preference for outside (non-partner) social support because of the perceived uncertain future and uncertain availability of committing partners in a high-stress environment.

=== Investment as predictor of mating strategies ===
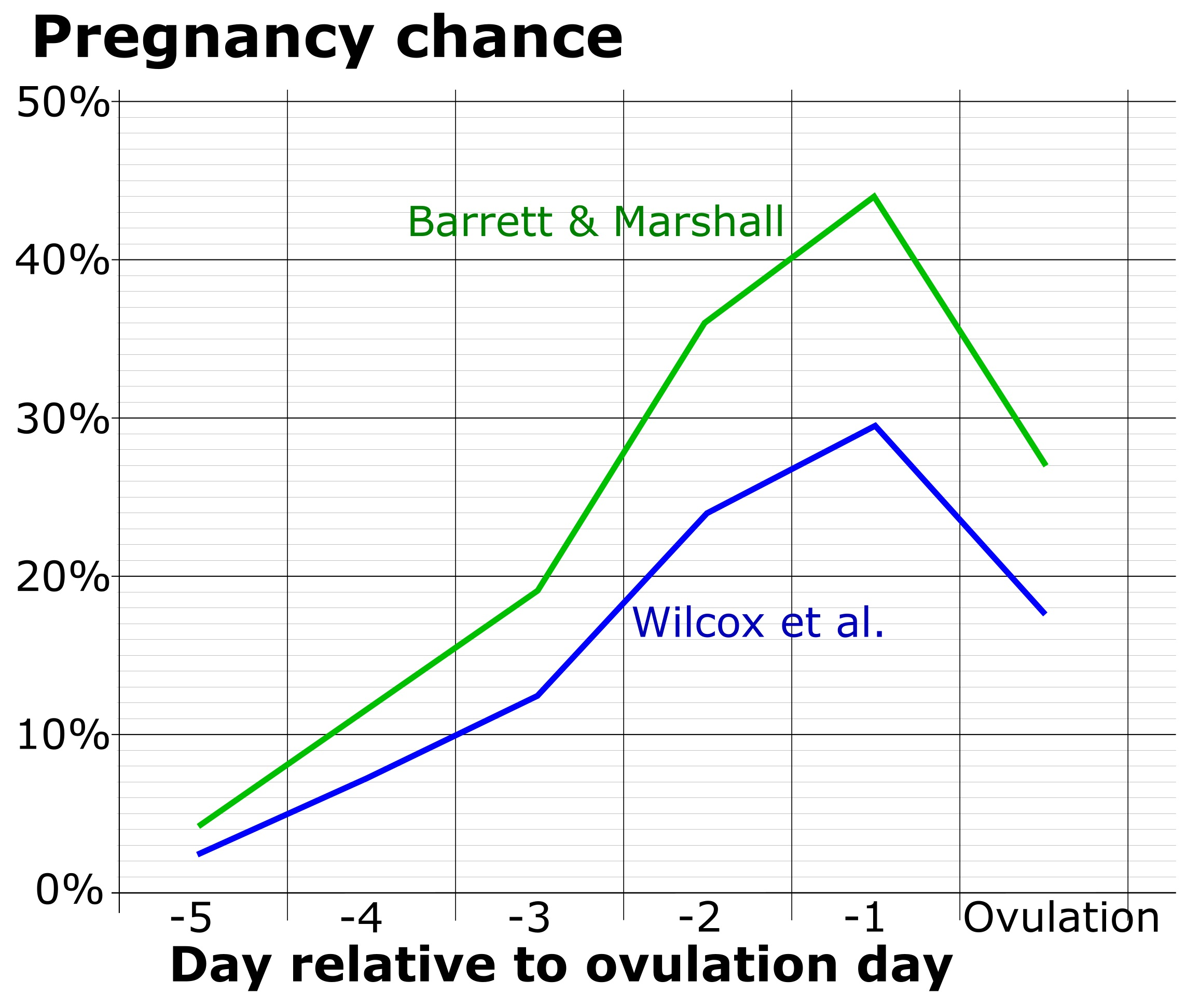
Chance of fertilization by menstrual cycle day relative to ovulation, with data from two different studies

==== Concealed ovulation ====
Women can only get pregnant while ovulating. Human ovulation is concealed, or not signaled externally. Concealed ovulation decreases paternity certainty because men are unsure when women ovulate. The evolution of concealed ovulation has been theorized to be a result of altriciality and increased need for paternal investment—if men are unsure of the time of ovulation, the best way to successfully reproduce would be to repeatedly mate with a woman throughout her cycle, which requires pair bonding, which in turn increases paternal investment.

==== Mating orientations ====
Sociosexuality was first described by Alfred Kinsey as a willingness to engage in casual and uncommitted sexual relationships. Sociosexual orientation describes sociosexuality on a scale from unrestricted to restricted. Individuals with an unrestricted sociosexual orientation have higher openness to sex in less committed relationships, and individuals with a restricted sociosexual orientation have lower openness to casual sexual relationships. However, today it is acknowledged that sociosexuality does not in reality exist on a one-dimensional scale. Individuals who are less open to casual relationships are not always seeking committed relationships, and individuals who are less interested in committed relationships are not always interested in casual relationships. Short- and long-term mating orientations are the modern descriptors of openness to uncommitted and committed relationships, respectively.

Parental investment theory, as proposed by Trivers, argues that the sex with higher obligatory investment will be more selective in choosing sex partners, and the sex with lower obligatory investment will be less selective and more interested in "casual" mating opportunities. The more investing sex cannot reproduce as frequently, causing the less investing sex to compete for mating opportunities. In humans, women have higher obligatory investment (pregnancy and childbirth), than men (sperm production). Women are more likely to have higher long-term mating orientations, and men are more likely to have higher short-term mating orientations.

Short- and long-term mating orientations influence women's preferences in men. Studies have found that women put great emphasis on career-orientation, ambition and devotion only when considering a long-term partner. When marriage is not involved, women put greater emphasis on physical attractiveness. Generally, women prefer men who are likely to perform high parental investment and have good genes. Women prefer men with good financial status, who are more committed, who are more athletic, and who are healthier.

Some inaccurate theories have been inspired by parental investment theory. The "structural powerlessness hypothesis" proposes that women strive to find mates with access to high levels of resources because as women, they are excluded from these resources directly. However, this hypothesis has been disproved by studies which found that financially successful women place an even greater importance on financial status, social status, and possession of professional degrees.

==== Polygyny ====
Decreased polygyny is associated with increased paternal investment.

=== The demographic transition ===
The demographic transition describes the modern decrease in both birth and death rates. From a Darwinian perspective, it does not make sense that families with more resources are having fewer children. One explanation for the demographic transition is the increased parental investment required to raise children who will be able to maintain the same level of resources as their parents.

== Criticisms and limitations ==
Repetition of the foundational research carried out by Angus Bateman in the 1940s has been unable to reproduce the original results. After rerunning the experimentation, Gowaty, Kim and Anderson concluded there was "relatively weak evidence for his [Bateman's] conclusions that (i) sexual selection acted primarily on males through female choice and male competition and profligacy in mating, and (ii) some males mated more frequently than others, producing higher V_{RS} [variance in reproductive success] among males than among females".

Studies have also identified methodological weaknesses and referential problems in the original research, and, analyzing Bateman's notes, Thierry Hoquet, Bridges and Gowaty concluded that Bateman's "laboratory data are inconsistent with "Bateman's Principles"".

According to Tang-Martinez and Ryder, Bateman's own work and some of that following his have "suffered from ... simplification". Fuentes says the simplification of Bateman's data resulted in an "incomplete and biased understanding of his original findings". Recognising value in Bateman's work, Tang-Martinez and Ryder say an over-reliance on Bateman's predictions hinder understanding about aspects of animal behaviour. Similarly, Gowaty, Kim and Anderson say the predominance of "Bateman's Principles" potentially obscures "reasonable alternative hypotheses explaining" variance in number of mates and variance in reproductive success.

Kokko and Jennions, reviewing Trivers' work, identify several problems in his account of sex role evolution: "a poorly substantiated claim that past investment is the main determinant of the current benefits that each sex can gain from providing additional parental care" (which, according to them, falls foul of the Concorde Fallacy); "an implicit assumption that the best evolutionary response to competition is to invest more heavily into traits that increase competitiveness" - which also conflicts with observations that many males do not do this. The authors says problems within Trivers' work have been repeated in subsequent studies by others based on the former's.

Monique Borgerhoff Mulder says anthropologists are uncomfortable with Trivers-Bateman predictions of parental investment theory when applied to humans because human mating systems are "highly variable, and the costs and benefits of different mating preferences are likely to be locally contingent". Writing in 2004, Borgerhoff Mulder described Trivers' work as a "powerful but somewhat blinding formula" from which scholars were gradually diversifying.

== See also ==
- Cinderella effect
- Cost of raising a child
- Kin selection
- Mate desertion
- Parental care in birds
- Precociality and altriciality
- r/K selection theory
