= Zuleyma Tang-Martínez =

Biologist

- Education: Saint Louis University (BS); University of California, Berkeley (MS, PhD); University of British Columbia
- Scientific career
- Workplaces: University of Missouri–St. Louis
- Doctoral students: Danielle N. Lee

Zuleyma Tang-Martínez (born in Venezuela, March 9, 1945) is a Venezuelan emeritus professor of biology at the University of Missouri–St. Louis. Earlier in her career (up until the early 1990s) she published under her former married name, Zuleyma Tang Halpin.

== Early life and education ==
Tang-Martínez was born in Venezuela on March 9, 1945. She and her family lived in ethnically segregated camps that were operated by an American oil company. Her father was a company accountant, permitting Tang-Martínez to be among the very few Venezuelans to be raised and attend school in the American camps. In 1960, she was sent by her parents to attend a Catholic, all-girls, boarding high school in Tampa FL because the oil camp schools did not go beyond the 8th grade. She completed high school in 1963; the nuns at the high school convinced her to go to college as a pre-med student, despite the fact that her parents had planned only on her finishing high school – as she was the first in her family to complete a high school education. She received her bachelor's degree cum laude from Saint Louis University, graduating in 1967 with a degree in biology. She moved to the University of California, Berkeley for her graduate studies, earning a master's degree in 1970 (specializing in cancer research) and a PhD in 1974 in Zoology (specializing in animal behavior). Tang-Martínez was a postdoctoral researcher at the University of British Columbia. For her dissertation she developed the habituation-discrimination technique in order to study individual discrimination by odors in the Mongolian gerbil Meriones unguiculatus.

== Career ==
Tang-Martínez was appointed assistant professor at the University of Missouri–St. Louis in 1976, the institution where she spent the rest of her career. She was very active in professional societies, especially with the American Society of Zoologists (now the Society for Integrative and Comparative Biology) where she was elected as chair of the Division of Animal Behavior. In the Animal Behavior Society, her primary scientific organization, she served as chair of the Animal Care Committee, the Latin American Affairs Committee, and the Diversity Committee. In 1991 she was elected to the 4-year presidential sequence, serving as ABS president from 1993 to 1994.

She studied social behavior, communication, and kin recognition of animals, as well as various aspects of dispersal, particularly with regards to how social structure impacts the genetics of populations. In 1987 she co-edited Mammalian Dispersal Patterns: The Effects of Social Structure on Population Genetics with Diane Chepko-Sade. More recently, she has challenged the theory of Angus John Bateman and Robert Trivers that male fruit flies behave more promiscuously due to their ability to produce millions of small sperm, and that this explains universal differences between male and female sexual behavior. She has argued against the universal application of Bateman's principle particularly with regards to the stereotypes of male and female sexual behaviour in humans. Her research was discussed in Angela Saini's Inferior: How Science Got Women Wrong and the New Research That's Rewriting the Story. She described the relationship between sociobiology and feminism as 'complex and multidimensional'. Tang-Martinez and her students studied a broad range of topics and species, including the social systems of rodents (gerbils, voles, hamsters, black-tailed prairie dogs, eastern chipmunks, deer mice, and capybaras), as well as other mammals ( e.g., raccoons, otters). Examples of her research include using habituation-discrimination to study the ability of voles and other mammals to detect individually-distinct odors.

Tang-Martinez became associate professor in 1982 and full professor in 1994. She was director of women's studies between 1989 and 1990, and interim chair of her biology department in 1990. She has been concerned about students as higher education becomes more corporate. In 1993 she became president of the Animal Behavior Society. During her term in the presidential sequence of ABS (a 4-year commitment), she created the ethnic diversity fund, which supports scientists from underrepresented groups to attend academic conferences. She also founded the Latin American Affairs Committee and served as its first chair. Currently (2020) she is the Animal Behavior Society historian and serves as an ex-officio member on the executive committee of the society. In her duties as historian, she organized the first-ever symposium on the history of animal behavior, which was subsequently published as a special issue in the society journal, Animal Behaviour (vol. 164).

She retired in September 2011 and was made Founders Professor of Biology. In 2014 she edited (jointly with Ken Yasukawa) the first volume of the series Animal Behavior: How and Why Animals Do The Things They Do. She remains part of a National Science Foundation proposal to develop the next generation of animal behavioural scientists (as Co-PI of "Weaving the Future of Animal Behavior").

=== Awards and honours ===
- 1995 Scientists of Color, University of California at Berkeley O'Neil Ray Collins Distinguished Minority Scientist
- 1995 St. Louis Educational Equity Coalition Educational Equity Award for Higher Education
- 2002 Alzheimer's Association of St. Louis, Volunteer of the Year Award for contributions to public policy
- 2006 Animal Behavior Society Exceptional Service Career Award
- 2009 Animal Behavior Society Quest Award
- 2011 Animal Behavior Society, elected a Fellow
- 2011 Hispanic Business magazine, selected as one of the top 100 most influential Hispanics in the US and one of the top 8 most influential academics
- 2022 Animal Behavior Society, Exemplar Award
- 2022 Inaugural speaker for Animal Behavior Society JEDI Plenary Lecture Series.

== Personal life ==
Tang-Martínez married her long-term partner, Arlene Zarembka, in Canada in 2005. In 2014, she and Arlene campaigned for marriage equality as a plaintiffs in a successful lawsuit demanding that the state of Missouri recognize their Canadian marriage. She is an advocate for Hispanics, other under-represented groups, and women in the sciences. She also is very civically involved: she serves as a commissioner on the St. Louis County Older Adults Commission, is a volunteer with the Alzheimer's Association of Greater St. Louis, serves on the research ethics committee of the Knight Alzheimer's Disease Research Center at the Washington University in St Louis Medical school (for the "Adult Children" research project of the ADRC), is a member of a dialogue group, Shalom Amigos (American Jews, Latin American Jews, and non-Jewish Latinos), and serves on the board of directors of the UMSL Retiree Association. She also has been a co-founder of two political groups in St. Louis (Privacy Rights Education Project or PREP founded in 1986 – now called PROMO and currently the primary state-wide LGBT advocacy group in Missouri) and MOmentum: Missouri Moving Forward, founded directly in response to the 2016 election.
