= Lee sisters =

American civil rights activists

The Lee sisters (Ernestine, Ruth Elaine, Sandra, Brenda, Peggy Jane, Joan and Susan Lee) are American civil rights activists who inspired the desegregation movement in Memphis in the 1960s.

== Early life and activism ==
The Lee sisters (Ernestine, Ruth Elaine, Sandra, Brenda, Peggy Jane, Joan and Susan) are the seven daughters of Robert and Alversa Williams Lee. Their mother's father, Dennis Williams, was born into slavery in Lauderdale County, Tennessee. At the time, Memphis was segregated, and young people were losing.

The eldest sister, Ernestine, attended LeMoyne–Owen College, and became involved with social justice whilst still a junior at high school. She was first arrested in 1960, when she joined friends from college to visit white-only libraries. For the following six years, the Lee sisters became more involved with the civil rights movement. Ernestine and the other Lee sisters organised several sit-ins in white-only libraries, lunch-counters and theatres. It has been said that their dedication inspired the desegregation movement in Memphis, Tennessee. They attended several marches, including the March on Washington for Jobs and Freedom, the Selma to Montgomery marches and the March Against Fear. In 1965, Jet magazine reported that members of the Lee family had been arrested seventeen times in the fight for racial justice; making them America's most arrested family. That year they were honored by the NAACP. (National Association for the Advancement of Colored People)

Elaine also studied at LeMoyne–Owen College, and after graduating in 1966 became a teacher. She became concerned that African-American children growing up in Memphis were not aware of their Elaine and Joan established Heritage Tours in 1983, an organisation who arrange tours centred on the history of the civil rights movement. Heritage Tours was the first African-American owned tour company in Tennessee. Together Elaine and Joan erected a monument to the African slaves who died between1852 and 1865. They founded the Slave Haven Underground Railroad Museum, which teaches people in Memphis about Black history. They were involved with establishing the Ida B. Wells Society. Peggy Jane trained in law and worked as an attorney in Memphis.

== Recognition and honours ==
In 2017 the African American Museum of Memphis erected a historical marker to honour the efforts of the Lee sisters. When asked about her involvement, Elaine said “I felt that we had a certain amount of power because we were on the side of right,”. The sisters were included the Memphis Women's Legacy Trail.

The Lee sisters are the aunts of Danielle N. Lee, a biology professor and science communicator at Southern Illinois University Edwardsville.
