= Danielle N. Lee =

American biologist

- Education: Tennessee Tech (BS) University of Memphis (MS) University of Missouri–St. Louis (PhD)
- Known for: The Urban Scientist (blog)
- Scientific career
- Fields: Behavioral ecology; Urban ecology; Mammalogy
- Workplaces: Southern Illinois University Edwardsville; Cornell University; Oklahoma State University
- Thesis: Individuals Differences in Exploratory Behavior of Prairie Voles, Microtus ochrogaster (2010)
- Doctoral advisor: Zuleyma Tang-Martínez
- Other academic advisors: Alexander G. Ophir
- Website: about.me/DNLee

Danielle N. Lee is an American assistant professor of biology at Southern Illinois University Edwardsville, best known for her science blogging and outreach efforts focused on increasing minority participation in STEM fields. Her research interests focus on the connections between ecology and evolution and its contribution to animal behavior. In 2017, Lee was selected as a National Geographic Emerging Explorer. With this position Lee traveled to Tanzania to research the behavior and biology of landmine-sniffing African giant pouched rats.

== Early life and education ==
Danielle N. Lee was born originally from South Memphis, Tennessee and she earned her bachelor's degree from Tennessee Technological University in 1996. While she intended to go into veterinary medicine, after being rejected from veterinary school four times, she began studying olfactory behavior in meadow voles and found her passion to pursue academic research. In 2000, Lee earned her MS from the University of Memphis, and in 2010 Lee graduated from the University of Missouri–St. Louis with a Ph.D. in Biology. In her thesis, Lee proposed a new system of describing animal personality traits from more subjective, emotional descriptors, to observational adjectives.

== Research and career ==
As of 2017, Lee teaches mammalogy and urban ecology at Southern Illinois University Edwardsville. Her research specializes in rodent behavior in both urban and rural settings. Her current focus of study is the African giant pouched rat, examining the extent to which they exhibit behavioral syndromes and the potential role of genetics in these behavioral differences. Lee has expanded her research to examine behavioral differences of small rodents across urban gradients in the St. Louis Metropolitan region. In 2012, Lee traveled to and lived in Tanzania to collect data about the African giant pouched rat for the "Wild Life of Our Homes" project. Centering on female rat biology, Lee aims to increase research about female biology that has been understudied in the animal kingdom.

== Advocacy and public service ==
From 2006 to 2011, Lee published the blog Urban Science Adventures! before joining the Scientific American Blog Network, where she wrote The Urban Scientist blog from 2011 to 2016. Through her posts, Lee covered her experience as a research scientist, issues relating to STEM diversity, and urban ecology (what she calls "science you can see in your backyard"). Her blog aimed to connect the scientific community with under-served and underrepresented populations, primarily African-American youth, through scientific explanations that were easily understandable.

Lee's outreach efforts focus on sharing science with the general public and the under-served, particularly through outdoor experiences and social media outlets. Lee founded the National Science and Technology News Service, a now-defunct media advocacy group focused on increasing interest in STEM and science news coverage within the African-American community. She has received many honors for her efforts to increase minority participation in STEM fields, and was named a top TED fellow 2015. Lee also avidly uses Twitter as a platform to share her science and outreach, and has been recognized as a top scientist to follow on Twitter.

For the show and podcast the Story Collider Lee explained that she has had to work 'twice as hard' as a woman of color in science; in 2013, Lee was invited to contribute to the science website Biology Online by a pseudonymous editor named "Ofek". When Lee declined to contribute to the website without compensation, Ofek allegedly responded by asking whether Lee was "an urban scientist or an urban whore". Lee rebuked Ofek on The Urban Scientist; however, the editor-in-chief of Scientific American, Mariette DiChristina, quickly removed Lee's response from the network. Although the removal of the blog post was allegedly due to legal concerns, Scientific American was widely seen as censoring Lee, causing outrage. Ultimately, Ofek was fired by Biology Online because of the incident.

In June 2020, Lee was a contributor to the #ShutDownSTEM and #ShutDownAcademia initiative, organized around the Black Lives Matter protests and demonstrations following the murder of George Floyd. The group called for STEM and other academic departments across the United States to hold all daily activities, including teaching, research work, and service responsibilities, on June 10, 2020, in order to reflect on how racism and privilege may affect those in their academic spaces; participate in local protests, and; learn about the history of anti-Black violence and racism.

On January first of 2023, Lee started the Urban Biomonitoring: A Collaborative Environmental Assessement Program with Local High School Students, which was a collaborative project that allowed for the inclusion of high school experience. This project helped to assess the environment while presenting high school students with hands-on experience. The assessment ended on December thirty-first 2025, and was successful in its goal to give high school students more experience opportunities.

== Selected awards and honors ==
- White House Champions of Change – STEM Access & Diversity
- 2009: Diversity Scholar, American Institute of Biological Sciences
- 2014: EBONY POWER 100 – Social Media Influencer
- 2014: The Grio 100's Class of 2014 - Science & Technology Leader
- 2015: TED Fellow
- 2017: National Geographic Emerging Explorers
- 2018: Plenary Speaker at annual British Ecological Society meeting

== Selected works and publications ==
- Ferkin, M. H., Lee, D. N., Leonard S. T. (2004). "The reproductive state of female voles affects their scent marking behavior and the responses of male conspecifics to such marks". Ethology. 110:257-272. doi:10.1111/j.1439-0310.2004.00961.x.
- Lee, D. N. (2020). "Diversity and inclusion activisms in animal behaviour and the ABS: a historical view from the U.S.A.". Animal Behaviour. 164: 273–280. doi:10.1016/j.anbehav.2020.03.019.
- Schell, C. J., Guy, C., Shelton, D. S., Campbell-Staton, S. C., Sealey, B. A., Lee, D. N., Harris, N. C. (2020). "Recreating Wakanda by promoting Black excellence in ecology and evolution". Nature Ecology and Evolution. 4 (10): 1285–1287. Bibcode:2020NatEE...4.1285S. doi:10.1038/s41559-020-1266-7. PMC 7861874. PMID 32710013.

== Personal life ==
Lee is related to the Memphis-based civil rights activists The Lee Sisters.
