= The Folly of Fools =

2011 book by Robert Trivers

- Author: Robert Trivers
- Publication date: October 25, 2011
- ISBN: 0-465-02755-5

The Folly of Fools: The Logic of Deceit and Self-Deception in Human Life (2011, Basic Books, ISBN 0465027555) by Robert Trivers is a book that examines the evolutionary explanations for deceit and self-deception. Trivers focuses primarily on humans but he includes examples from many other organisms as well. Trivers' starting point is to illustrate that self-deception is something of an evolutionary puzzle. While the evolutionary benefits to deceiving other organisms are obvious at first glance it seems highly counter-intuitive to think that it could ever be in the evolutionary interest of an organism to deceive itself.

In the book Trivers discusses the evolutionary reasons for animals engaging in self-deception. He provides numerous examples of this both at the individual level and at the societal level, eventually discussing examples of self-deception in the history of the United States and Israel.

The essence of his analysis is that "the primary reason we fool ourselves is to fool others". Humans are exceptionally good at picking up various verbal and physical cues (e.g., speech intonation, eye movements,...) that indicate when another human is practicing deception. There are many situations such as playing "chicken" and seeing who will back down first, where it can actually benefit an organism to deceive itself, by so doing the organism can better deceive others.

== Reception ==
Richard Dawkins greeted the book with great praise, saying:

This is a remarkable book, by a uniquely brilliant scientist. Robert Trivers has a track record of producing highly original ideas, which have gone on to stimulate much research. His Darwinian theory of self-deception is arguably his most provocative and interesting idea so far. The book is enlivened by Trivers’ candid personal style, and is a pleasure to read. Strongly recommended.

Other reviewers were more moderate. John Horgan in the New York Times was mostly positive in his evaluation of the ideas and evidence that Trivers put forward but said of Trivers' writing style:

Trivers is not an elegant stylist like Dawkins, Wilson or Pinker. His technical explanations can be murky, his political rants cartoonishly crude.
