= Mate desertion =

Mate desertion occurs when one or both parents abandon their current offspring, and thereby reduce or stop providing parental care. Often, by deserting, a parent attempts to increase breeding opportunities by seeking out another mate. This form of mating strategy behavior is exhibited in insects, birds and mammals. Typically, males are more likely to desert, but both males and females have been observed to practice mate desertion.

== Evolutionary theory ==
=== Conflict driving mate desertion ===
Mate desertion involves the decision by an already-mated individual to either continue providing parental care or to desert. In making this decision, a parent must balance investment in terms of current and future reproductive success, choosing the optimal strategy, or one that provides the greatest net benefit towards lifetime reproductive success. Current success is measured by the number of surviving offspring, whereas future success is measured by the potential to successfully produce offspring in future seasons. These trade-offs between costs and benefits are further reflected in the two major conflicts driving mate desertion: 1) parent-offspring conflict over the level of parental investment that a parent should provide and 2) sexual conflict between mates over who should provide care and how much care should be provided.

According to evolutionary biologist Robert Trivers, parental investment is defined as “any investment by the parent in an individual offspring that increases the offspring's chance of surviving (and hence reproductive success) at the cost of the parent's ability to invest in other offspring.” This investment includes investing in gametes and feeding and protecting young, which is also known as brooding. Often, the amount of parental investment necessary to maximize fitness differs between parent and offspring, thereby creating parent-offspring conflict. While increasing parental investment increases the current offspring's likelihood to survive and reproduce, this investment comes at the expense of the parent's ability to invest in future offspring. Therefore, when uniparental care is equally effective as biparental care, natural selection will favor mate desertion, allowing the deserter to either remate or conserve resources for future reproduction.

However, the decision of which mate deserts first and when creates varying reproductive outcomes for both males and females, leading to sexual conflict over parental investment. This occurs because the deserted organism pays all costs of parental care while the deserter not only shares the benefits of the reproductive success of the current offspring, but also gains benefits from additional mating opportunities. Theoretically, both males and females would be expected to evolve adaptations in response to this sexual conflict, which would ultimately lead to sexually antagonistic coevolution between male and female traits.

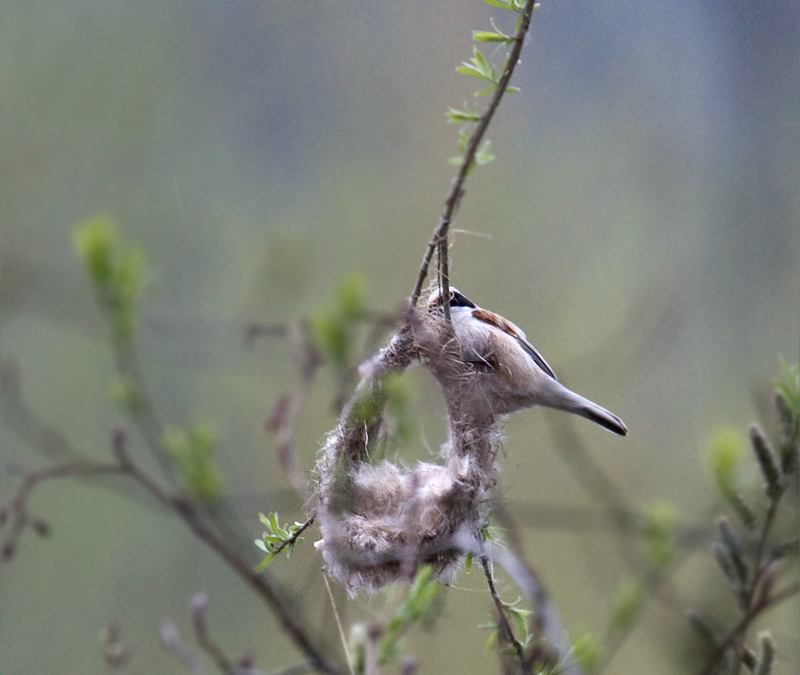
Elaborate nest of a penduline tit

In penduline tits (Remiz pendulinus), uniparental care is dominant, and either sex is capable of desertion during the egg laying period. Typically, females care 50–70% of the time, males care 5–20% of the time, and both parents desert 30–40% of the time, condemning the offspring to death. In this system, males build elaborate nests and usually desert once these nests have been filled with the females' eggs.

As a result, in response, females have adopted two counter-adaptive behaviors that function to deceive the male regarding the clutch's progress. Females conceal their eggs by burying them and aggressively attack males who approach the nest during the egg laying period. Studies have shown a high correlation between length of time a male stays before deserting and number of days a female keeps her eggs buried. This relationship suggests that egg burial has evolved as an adaptive female behavior that attempts to control information males use to decide whether or not they should desert.

=== Response to desertion ===
After one partner deserts, the remaining partner has three options. First, it may attempt to raise the young on its own. This usually occurs when the investment required by one parent to successfully raise the current offspring to maturity is less than that needed to produce new offspring. As a result, the remaining partner is forced into a situation Trivers' coined as “cruel bind.” Here, the deserter effectively forces its partner to stay, gaining the benefit of the deserted parent's continued investment at the cost of additional mating opportunities for the deserted parent.

Second, if the cost of raising offspring alone is high and the cost of remating is low, the deserted individual may choose to desert the offspring as well and attempt to breed again. In some cases, the second deserter may even take part in filial cannibalism, reaping its lost investment by eating its own offspring as nourishment. For example, in scissortail sergeant fish (Abudefduf sexfasciatus), male parental care is dominant, and males undergo brood cycling in which they alternate between mating and parental phases. When broods are artificially reduced early in the breeding phase, male scissor-tail sergeants are more likely to cannibalise eggs and return to the mating phase, primarily because reduced broods indicate decreased current reproductive success.

Lastly, a deserted individual may also attempt to trick another mate into helping provide care for its young, circumventing its cruel bind. For instance, a female who cuckolds a male, deceiving him into raising another male's offspring, benefits by reducing the amount of care she must provide and by conserving resources for future reproduction. In response, the evolution of counter-adaptations that allow males to guard against female deception would be expected, as it is evolutionarily maladaptive for an organism to invest in unrelated offspring.

== Patterns of mate desertion ==
=== Explanations ===
Two explanations have been proposed as evidence for why mate desertion by males is more commonly observed in nature. First, costs in lost mating opportunities are higher in males than in females. Because males have greater variance in reproductive success, their lifetime reproductive success depends more on number of mating opportunities, and thus they often benefit more from desertion. Second, mode of fertilization often influences degree of parental care, which in turn influences which sex will desert. Generally speaking, male parental care is predicted by external fertilization, and female parental care is predicted by internal fertilization. This pattern of parental care is best explained by the “Association Hypothesis," which argues that association with embryos predisposes a sex for parental care.

For example, in species where mate desertion by males is prominent, females reproduce through internal fertilization and are thus responsible for carrying the eggs. While this intimate connection allows the female to offer better care for her offspring, the male's comparative separation makes him much less likely to be able to adequately care for his young. Furthermore, inherent to internal fertilization is the fact that it is impossible for females to desert because they are the sex bearing offspring. Under this theory, females are often not in a position to leave their young, while males can leave and have much less to offer by sticking around. Conversely, in organisms that practice external fertilization—including certain species of fish—males are often the primary caretakers for young.

=== Factors influencing mate desertion ===
Natural selection tends to favor desertion when costs are low and benefits are high. Benefits include increased mating opportunities in the same breeding season and reduced energetic costs associated with parental care, whereas costs include decreased mating opportunities and reduced future reproductive success. Both the timing and probability of mate desertion have been shown to be influenced by a variety of factors. For instance, desertion by either sex is favored when remating opportunities are high, food for young is abundant, predation is low, current offspring are older, require little parental investment and are smaller than average size, and the deserter's contribution to parental care is low.

Another factor that has been shown to influence probability of mate desertion is a biased operational sex ratio, which is defined as the ratio of sexually active males to sexually active females. In convict cichlid fish, males are more likely to desert when there is a female-biased sex ratio, as males have a higher chance of remating and increasing reproductive success. Furthermore, probability of male desertion in this particular species is also increased where there is low predation (high predation leads to biparental care for offspring survival), mature offspring, and smaller than average offspring size. In another population of cichlids (Aequidens coeruleopunctatus), brood reduction leading to earlier male mate desertion has also been observed, and here, by deserting, not only does the male save energy, but he also increases his chance of breeding and thus his reproductive success as well.

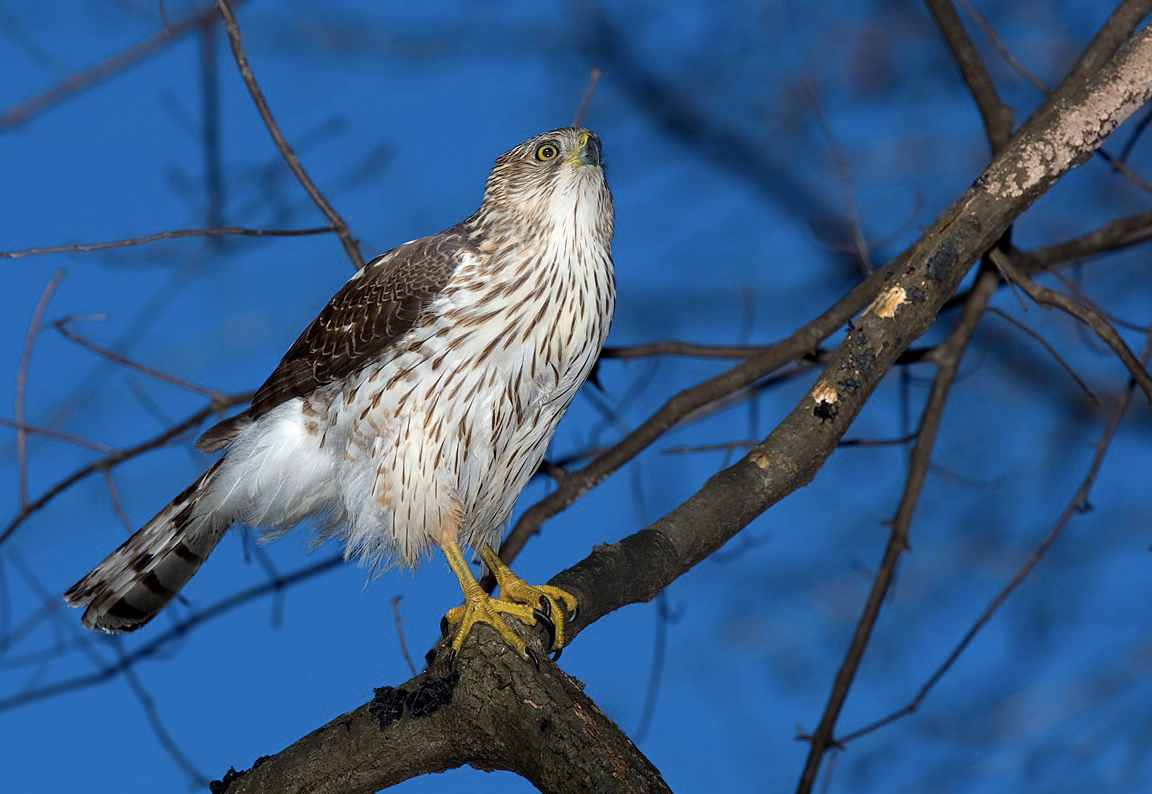
Cooper's hawk

Similarly, in Cooper's hawks, female desertion of offspring has been found to be closely related to both the likelihood of offspring survival and future reproductive success. Females in weak physical condition are more likely to abandon offspring to complete migration, increasing breeding chances and opportunities for the following year. In Whiskered terns, the majority of deserters are female and is related to provisioning rate: females providing more food were less likely to desert.

In mammals, aardwolves have been shown to practice male mate desertion in response to female promiscuity. Lastly, ambisexual mate desertion, in which both sexes desert at nearly equal frequencies, has been observed in snail kites. Mate desertion by either sex depends on food supply, in that snail kites are more likely to desert when snails are abundant and rate of nesting success is high. Thus, mating strategies exhibited by snail kites are somewhat plastic, depending on varying environmental conditions.

== Game theory ==
=== Lazarus's model of mate desertion ===
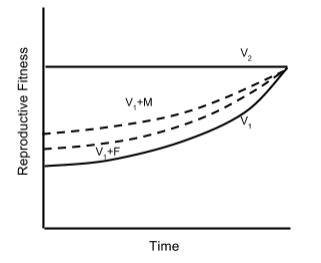
Case 1. Because V_{2} > V_{1}+(M or F), neither parent gains any reproductive advantage by deserting their mate. For both parents, reproductive fitness equals V_{2}. V represents reproductive success (see text for more details).

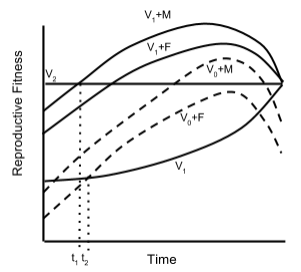
Case 2. At t_{1}, the male benefits from deserting the brood because V_{1}+M > V_{2}. At this point, the female's fitness equals V_{1}. At t_{2}, the female benefits from deserting the brood because V_{0}+F > V_{1}. At this point, the male's fitness equals V_{0}+M, and the female's fitness equals V_{0}+F. V represents reproductive success (see text for more details).

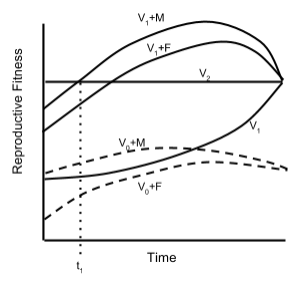
Case 3. At t_{1}, the male benefits from deserting the brood because V_{1}+M > V_{2}. At this point, the female's fitness equals V_{1}. After this, the female cannot improve her fitness past V_{1} by deserting, so she chooses to stay and provide care. V represents reproductive success (see text for more details).

Game theory helps explain when parents are more or less likely to desert their offspring by taking into account the costs and benefits associated with these decisions. John Lazarus developed a well-known game theory model for mate desertion, in which different outcomes are predicted using a payoff matrix. In this particular model, the benefits of desertion depend both on the ability of the deserter to gain additional mating opportunities and on the deserted partner's strategy.

Lazarus's model of mate desertion defines conditions that lead to three possible cases: 1) both parents stay, 2) both parents desert, or 3) one parent stays and one parent deserts. If both parents stay with the offspring, then neither gains the benefits from deserting their mate. If both parents desert, each individual will do so at a time offering them maximal benefit based on when the other parent leaves. If only one parent deserts, then the deserter will leave at a time when benefits are high and costs are low. Variables are used to describe the different fitness levels achieved by each parent.

- V_{0}: reproductive success obtained when no parents care for the young.
- V_{1}: reproductive success obtained when only one parent cares for the young (for the purpose of simplicity, model assumes that V_{1} is the same for both male-only and female-only care)
- V_{2}: reproductive success obtained when both parents care for the young
- M: male's benefit from deserting
- F: female's benefit from deserting

In case one, both parents choose to stay. For either the male or the female, the total payoff for the deserter (V_{1}+M or V_{1}+F) is less than the reproductive success obtained when both parents provide care (V_{2}). Therefore, neither benefits from deserting.

Case two arises when both parents desert. Normally, the payoff for desertion is higher for one sex than the other. This model assumes that males benefit more from desertion than do females (M>F), though this is not the case for all species. When the payoff a male receives by deserting (V_{1}+M) exceeds the reproductive success of providing care (V_{2}) for the young, he should desert. At this point, the male's reproductive success is V_{1}+M, and the female's reproductive success is V_{1}. Eventually the payoff for a female deserting (V_{0}+F) will exceed the benefits of caring alone (V_{1}). At this point, she is also expected to desert, leaving the brood with no parental care.

Lastly, case three occurs when one parent deserts, and the other stays. In this model, because of the assumption that M>F, the male will desert first when the payoff of deserting (V_{1}+M) is greater than the benefits of investing in offspring (V_{2}). At this point, the male's reproductive success is V_{1} + M, and the female's reproductive success is V_{1}. However, in contrast to case two, the female will never benefit by deserting because the payoff (V_{0}+F) never exceeds the benefits obtained by caring alone (V_{1}). Consequently, in situations where the female's benefits of deserting are low, she will remain to raise her brood, maximizing her reproductive success.
