= Robert Trivers =

American biologist (1943–2026)

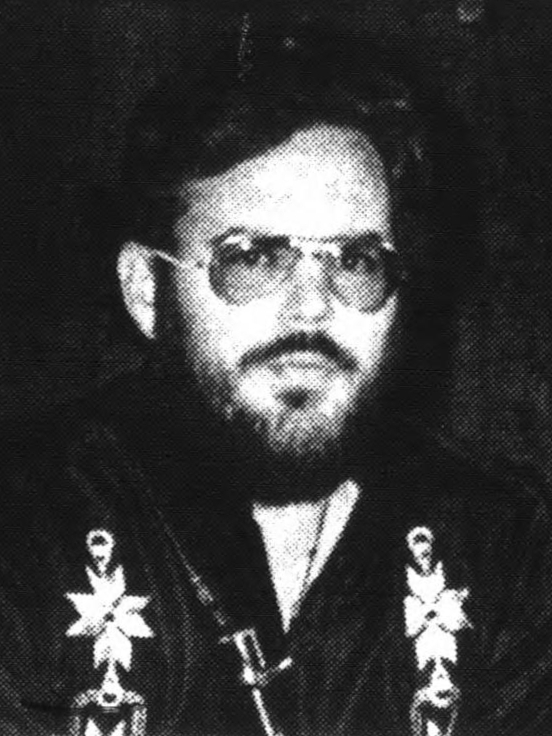
- Trivers in 1978
- Born: Robert Ludlow Trivers; February 19, 1943; Washington, D.C., U.S.
- Died: March 12, 2026 (aged 83); Mount Vernon, New York, U.S.
- Education: Harvard University
- Known for: Evolutionary biology, Animal behavior, Sociobiology
- Spouses: Lorna Staple (1974–1988); Debra Dixon (1997–2004)
- Children: 5
- Awards: Crafoord Prize (2007)
- Scientific career
- Fields: Biology
- Workplaces: Rutgers University
- Thesis: Natural Selection and Social Behavior (1972)
- Doctoral advisor: Ernest Williams
- Website: roberttrivers.com

Robert Ludlow Trivers (/ˈtrɪvərz/; February 19, 1943 – March 12, 2026) was an American evolutionary biologist and sociobiologist who profoundly influenced both fields. Trivers proposed the theories of reciprocal altruism (1971), parental investment (1972), facultative sex ratio determination (1973), and parent–offspring conflict (1974). He has also contributed by explaining self-deception as an adaptive evolutionary strategy (first described in 1976) and discussing intragenomic conflict.

== Background ==
Robert Trivers was born in Washington, D.C., on February 19, 1943, the son of Mildred Trivers, a poet and Howard Trivers. His father was an American academic and US State Department diplomat who played a key role in the denazification of post-war Germany, taking part in negotiations at the Potsdam Conference, 1947 Moscow Conference, and the 1949 Paris Conference, later involved in developing US policy related to the 1956 Hungarian Uprising and the Cuban Missile Crisis in 1962. Growing up in a diplomatic household, Robert Trivers attended schools in Berlin, Copenhagen and Washington D.C, before attending Phillips Academy in Massachusetts and going on to study American History at Harvard.

Trivers was open about his diagnosis of bipolar disorder, which was first misdiagnosed as schizophrenia when he had a manic episode at Harvard, requiring hospitalisation for several months and treatment with first generation antipsychotics. During his recovery, he developed an interest in psychology and social biology, although initially he chose not to pursue this, applying to law school at Harvard and Yale; he was rejected from both, in part due to his mental health.

Trivers spent around 13 years living on and off in Jamaica, and was married twice to Jamaican women. He had 4 children with his first wife, Lorna Stable, and one with his second wife, Debra Dixon. As of 2026, he had 10 grandchildren and one great grandson.

He met Huey P. Newton, Chairman of the Black Panther Party, in 1978 when Newton applied while in prison to do a reading course with Trivers as part of a graduate degree in History of Consciousness at UC Santa Cruz. Trivers and Newton became close friends: Newton was godfather to one of Trivers's daughters. Trivers joined the Black Panther Party in 1979. He and Newton published an analysis of the role of self-deception by the flight crew in the crash of Air Florida Flight 90. Trivers was "ex-communicated" from the Panthers by Newton in 1982 for "his own good".

Trivers died in Mount Vernon, New York, on March 12, 2026, at the age of 83.

== Career ==
Trivers studied evolutionary theory with Ernst Mayr and William Drury at Harvard from 1968 to 1972, when he earned his PhD in biology. At Harvard, he published a series of some of the most influential and highly cited papers in evolutionary biology. His first major paper as a graduate student was "The evolution of reciprocal altruism", published in 1971. In this paper, Trivers offers a solution to the longstanding problem of cooperation among unrelated individuals and by doing so overcame a crucial problem for how to police the system by proposing how natural selection could evolve ways to detect cheaters.

His next major work, "Parental investment and sexual selection", was published the following year. Here Trivers proposed a general framework for understanding sexual selection that had eluded evolutionary thinkers since Charles Darwin. Arguably his most important paper, it arose from watching male and female pigeons out the window of his third floor apartment in Cambridge, Massachusetts, and by his reading a 1948 paper by Angus Bateman ("Intra-sexual selection in Drosophila") which demonstrated that sex differences in the intensity of selection in fruit flies were based on their ability to obtain mates. The primary insight of Trivers was that the key variable underlying the evolution of sex differences across species was relative parental investment in offspring.

He was on the faculty at Harvard University from 1973 to 1978, where he continued his work, publishing influential papers on facultative sex ratio determination (1973), and parent–offspring conflict (1974). He also contributed by explaining self-deception as an adaptive evolutionary strategy (first described in 1976) and discussing intragenomic conflict. After this work, he then moved to the University of California, Santa Cruz where he was a faculty member 1978 to 1994. He was a Rutgers University faculty member from 1994 until 2015. In the 2008–09 academic year, he was a Fellow at the Berlin Institute for Advanced Study.

Trivers was awarded the 2007 Crafoord Prize in Biosciences for "his fundamental analysis of social evolution, conflict and cooperation".

=== Association with Jeffrey Epstein ===
In the 2010s, through his Biosocial Research Foundation, Trivers accepted multiple payments from notorious sex offender Jeffrey Epstein. In 2015, years after Epstein's conviction, Trivers defended Epstein's reputation by minimising his crimes and saying that he already served his prison sentence and settled lawsuits against him. Of Epstein's assaults on underage girls, Trivers told a reporter, "By the time they're 14 or 15 they're like grown women were 60 years ago, so I don't see the acts as so heinous." In 2017, Trivers described his relationship with Epstein as "valuable mostly because he is extremely bright, open-minded and widely travelled... he gives me consistent, warm support without me having to write endless applications for grants, and trusts me to put it to good use".

In 2026, the White House published a 2018 e-mail from Trivers to Epstein in which he described trans women as providing "the best of both worlds" to men whose "fantasy is to suck a man's dick" but who were otherwise "completely heterosexual". Trivers stated that people were now "pushing" for hormone replacement therapy earlier, claiming that hormones would be given to three-year-olds and saying he "would be frightened to do that" to his own child.

=== Rutgers 'Human Aggression' class ===
In 2014, Rutgers University suspended Trivers with pay for refusing to teach a class on 'Human Aggression' that had been assigned to him. Trivers told the class that he knew nothing about the subject and that he would do his best to learn the subject along with them with the help of a guest lecturer. Rutgers suspended Trivers for refusing to teach and for involving the students in the controversy. In an interview with the student newspaper The Daily Targum, Trivers described himself as "one of the greatest social theorists in evolutionary biology alive, period", and stated that the assigned subject was out of his area of expertise, adding "You would think the university would show a little respect for my teaching abilities on subjects that I know about and not force me to teach a course on a subject that I do not at all master."

== Significant publications ==
=== Papers ===
- Trivers, R. L. (1971). "The Evolution of Reciprocal Altruism". The Quarterly Review of Biology. 46 (1): 35–57. doi:10.1086/406755. JSTOR 2822435. S2CID 19027999.
- Trivers, R. L. (1972). Parental investment and sexual selection. In B. Campbell (Ed.) Sexual selection and the descent of man, 1871-1971 (pp 136–179). Chicago, Aldine.
- Trivers, RL; Willard, DE (1973). "Natural selection of parental ability to vary the sex ratio of offspring". Science. 179 (4068): 90–2. Bibcode:1973Sci...179...90T. doi:10.1126/science.179.4068.90. JSTOR 1734960. PMID 4682135. S2CID 29326420.
- Trivers, R. L. (1974). "Parent-Offspring Conflict". American Zoologist. 14 (1): 249–264. doi:10.1093/icb/14.1.249.
- Trivers, R. L.; Hare, H. (1976). "Haploidploidy and the evolution of the social insect". Science. 191 (4224): 249–63. Bibcode:1976Sci...191..249T. doi:10.1126/science.1108197. PMID 1108197.
- Trivers, R. L. (1991). Deceit and self-deception: The relationship between communication and consciousness. In: M. Robinson and L. Tiger (eds.) Man and Beast Revisited, Smithsonian, Washington, DC, pp. 175–191.

=== Books ===
- Trivers, R. L. (1985) Social Evolution. Benjamin/Cummings, Menlo Park, CA.
- Trivers, R. L. (2002) Natural Selection and Social Theory: Selected Papers of Robert L. Trivers. (Evolution and Cognition Series) Oxford University Press, Oxford. ISBN 0-19-513062-6
- Burt, A. & Trivers, R. L. (2006) Genes in Conflict : The Biology of Selfish Genetic Elements. Belknap Press, Harvard. ISBN 0-674-01713-7
- Trivers R, Palestis BG, Zaatari D. (2009) The Anatomy of a Fraud: Symmetry and Dance TPZ Publishers ISBN 978-0-615-28756-0
- Trivers R (2011) The Folly of Fools: The Logic of Deceit and Self-Deception in Human Life Basic Books ISBN 978-0-465-02755-2
- Trivers R (2015) Wild Life: Adventures of an Evolutionary Biologist. Plympton. ISBN 978-1938972126
