= Mate choice in humans =

Desirable qualities in partners

Mating preferences are qualities that one desires in a romantic or sexual partner. Research across many domains, such as evolutionary biology, psychology, and anthropology, shows that humans display both widely shared (consensual) preferences – like preferences for kindness, intelligence, and health – as well as sex-differentiated preferences shaped by ancestral selection pressures. These preferences are understood within the framework of sexual selection (first proposed by Charles Darwin in 1871) and more contemporary theories that draw on evolutionary explanations, cultural variation, and evidence from actual mating behaviors. These theories account for the variation in desires for certain traits, the divergence of preference between men and women, and the adoption of short-term vs long-term mating strategies. Together, these approaches explain the origins, adaptive functions, and real-world outcomes of human mate preferences.

== Influences on human mating preference ==
A study of 37 cultures showed that, generally, culture plays a substantial role in forming human mating preference, accounting for 14% of variance across the study, with sex also having an effect on preference, although a smaller one (2.4%) than culture.

The study by Buss et al. indicated the largest difference between cultures affecting mating preference was modern versus traditional attitudes towards mating. It also indicated that sex has an effect on a few mate preferences - for example, appearance and "resource potential" - but little effect on most others.

=== Sexual selection ===
One of the earliest theories posited to explain mate preferences was Darwin's theory of sexual selection. This theory came about when he noticed that certain characteristics (most famously, the feathers of a male peacock) appeared to have no survival value. Unsatisfied with his theory of natural selection as the primary driver of evolution, he proposed that sexual selection was at play. Namely, Darwin suggested two mechanisms of this evolutionary process.

The first mechanism, intrasexual selection, describes the competition with same-sex others for access to mates. This can include directly antagonistic interactions, such as physical contests and fights, or indirect interactions like competition for territory or high status positions. As a result of success in such competitions, the victors are able to mate, meaning that their heritable traits are passed down to offspring with greater frequency. Those who lost do not gain access to mates and have less reproductive success. Over many generations, this differential reproductive success causes the qualities that contribute to winning these competitions (like upper body strength, formidability, or intelligence, for example) to become more common in the population. This pattern shapes preferences because individuals who choose mates with successful, competitive traits have a greater chance of producing children who survive and are reproductively successful themselves. As a result, preferences for such advantageous traits are passed down along with the traits themselves.

The second mechanism, intersexual selection (also called epigamic selection), represents one sex's propensity to prefer and, in turn, select specific members of the opposite sex that embody preferred characteristics. Because desired qualities (like physical attractiveness or intelligence, for instance) are notably heritable, individuals who select mates who display such qualities are more likely to have children who also possess them. Over time, this process increases the frequency of preferred traits in the population and also strengthens the preferences themselves (offspring inherit both the desired traits and the preference for them). Thus, this preferential mate choice directly influences one's reproductive success.

Both processes work together to select for qualities that enhance an individual's reproductive success, favoring characteristics that improve mating opportunities (even if those characteristics do not directly improve survival) and, importantly, shaping what we deem to be preferable in a mate. These mechanisms have been substantiated across virtually every species that reproduces sexually, highlighting sexual selection theory as a pervasive evolutionary force.

=== Parental investment ===
Research on human mating strategies is guided by the theory of sexual selection, and in particular, Robert Trivers' concept of parental investment. Trivers defined parental investment as "any investment by the parent in an individual offspring that increases the offspring's chance of surviving (and hence reproductive success) at the cost of the parent's ability to invest in other offspring." The support given to each offspring typically differs between the father and mother. Trivers posited that it is the differential parental investment between males and females that drives the process of sexual selection. In turn, sexual selection leads to the evolution of sexual dimorphism in mate choice, competitive ability, and courtship displays (see secondary sex characteristics). Females have a higher minimal investment in offspring than males. Minimum parental investment is the least required care for successful reproduction. In humans, females have a higher minimum parental investment. They have to invest in internal fertilization, placentation, and gestation, followed by childbirth and lactation. While human males can invest heavily in their offspring as well, their minimum parental investment is still lower than that of females.

This same concept can be looked at from an economic perspective regarding the costs of engaging in sexual relations. Females incur the higher costs, as they carry the possibility of becoming pregnant among other costs. Conversely, males have comparatively minimal costs of having a sexual encounter. Therefore, evolutionary psychologists have predicted a number of sex differences in human mating psychologies.

=== Sex ratio ===
Human mating is dependent on the operational sex ratio. The local operational sex ratio has been shown to have an impact on mating strategies. This is defined as the ratio of marriage-age males to marriage-age females, with a high ratio representing more males and a low ratio representing more females in the local area. When there is an imbalance of sexes, the rare sex typically has more choice, while the plentiful sex has to compete more strategically for the rare sex. This leads to the plentiful sex competing on specific areas that the rare sex finds attractive. Additionally, the plentiful sex will adopt more of the rare sex's mating strategy. In a population with a low sex ratio, females will adopt a more short-term mating strategy and will compete more intensely on things like physical attractiveness. On the other hand, in a society with a high sex ratio, males will adopt a more long-term strategy to attractive females. (See going steady.) For example, in the major metropolitan areas of China, females are generally in short supply and as such are more likely to be fulfilled should they find a mate while many men are simply left out of the dating market. On the other hand, on the Island of Manhattan and in some Western university campuses, females are in excess and as such they compete intensely for male attention, giving rise to hookup culture and short-term mating websites such as Tinder.

In 2005, the evolutionary psychologist David Schmitt conducted a multinational survey of sexual attitudes and behaviors involving 48 countries called the International Sexual Description Project (ISSR). Schmitt assessed relationships between several societal-level variables and average scores on the Sociosexual Orientation Inventory questionnaire. One variable that was shown to significantly predict a nation's average SOI score was the Operational Sex Ratio (OSR). This prediction was confirmed; OSR was significantly positively correlated with national SOI scores. Another variable that Schmitt predicted would influence SOI scores was the need for biparental care. In societies where extensive care from both parents is needed to ensure offspring survival, the costs of having sex with an uncommitted partner are much higher. Schmitt found significant negative correlations between several indices of need for biparental care (e.g. infant mortality, child malnutrition, and low birth-weight infants) and national SOI scores.

=== Parasite stress on mate choice ===
The parasite-stress theory, otherwise known as pathogen stress, states that parasites or diseases put stress on the life development of an organism, leading to a change in the appearance of their sexually attractive traits. The initial research on the Hamilton–Zuk hypothesis (see indicator traits) showed that, within one species (brightly colored birds), there was greater sexual selection for males that had brighter plumage (feathers). In addition, Hamilton and Zuk showed that, comparing across multiple species, there is greater selection for physical attributes in species under greater parasitic stress. This has influenced research regarding human mate choice.

In societies with a high prevalence of parasites or pathogens, members would derive greater evolutionary advantage from selecting for physical attractiveness/good looks in mate choice compared to that derived by members of societies with lower prevalence. Humans could use physical attractiveness to determine resistance to parasites and diseases, which are believed to lower their sufferers' ability to portray attractive traits from then on and limit the number of high-quality pathogen-resistant mates. In cultures where parasitic infection is especially high, members could use cues available to them to determine the physical health status of the potential mate. Regardless of the wealth or ideology, the females in areas that are more at risk or have higher rates of parasites and diseases would weigh masculinity more highly when rating potential mates.

- Scarification: In pre-industrial societies, body markings such as tattoos or scarifications are predicted to have been a way in which individuals could attract potential mates, by indicating the reproductive quality of a person. Meaning, scars on the body could be viewed by prospective mates as evidence that a person has overcome parasites and is thus more attractive to potential mates. Research investigating this hypothesis (Singh and Bronstad 1997) found that in instances of increased pathogen prevalence, the only anatomical area with evidence of scarification in females was found on the stomach, with no evidence found for male scarification.
- Masculinity: In societies where there are high levels of parasites or diseases, the females, as the overall health of members decreases, are predicted to increasingly emphasize masculinity in their mate preferences. Women look for signs of masculinity in areas such as the voice, face and body shape of males. The face, in particular, may hold several cues for parasitic resistance and has been the subject of most attractiveness research.
- Polygamy: Tropical areas were originally associated with polygynous societies as a result of the surrounding environment being both ecologically richer and homogeneous. However, whilst tropical areas were associated with polygamy, pathogen stress is predicted as a better indicator of polygamy and has been positively correlated with it. Furthermore, over the course of human evolution, areas which had high levels of parasite-stress may have shifted the polygamy threshold and increased the presence of certain types of polygamy in a society.

==== Criticisms ====
Gangested and Buss (2009) say that research indicates that parasite stress may have only influenced mate choice through females searching for "good genes" which show parasite resistance, in areas which have high prevalence of parasites. John Cartwright also points out that females may be simply avoiding the transmission of parasites to themselves rather than it being them choosing males with good genes and that females look for more than just parasite-resistant genes.

=== Determination of mate value ===
An individual's mate value corresponds to the likelihood of his or her future reproductive success, determined by ability of said individual to produce healthy offspring in the future, based on his or her age and sex. Mate value is determined by sexual selection, that is, what each sex considers to be desirable in a mate. Over evolutionary time, the individuals with higher mate values generally have greater reproductive success. These qualities that comprise mate value evolved into what is considered physically attractive, meaning individuals with a high mate value are perceived to be more attractive by the opposite sex than those with low mate value. Furthermore, individuals with a high mate value can afford to be stricter in mate selection and may reproduce more often than those with a low mate value. Biological sex differences suggest that there are differences between the sexes in mate value as well.

Mate value is perceived through signals and cues. Signals are characteristics that have been selected for because they offer reliable changes in receiver behavior that lead to higher reproductive success for the receiver. Conversely, cues have not been selected for to carry meaning, but instead are byproducts. But with sexual selection, cues can become signals over time. Costly signals are ones that require intense effort for the signaler to send. Because they require high investment, costly signals are typically honest signals of underlying genetic qualities.

== Preference ranking across cultures and sexes ==
While there are differences across cultures and sexes, within both domains there is a high degree of similarity in the ordering of preferred characteristics in a mate. Buss et al.'s study of 37 cultures showed "strong commonalities" between the cultures, which "transcended particular samples", with nearly all placing "tremendous value of the mate characteristics of dependability, emotional stability, kindness-understanding, and intelligence". Similarly, across male-female sex difference there was a "high degree of similarity in their preference ordering". Buss further reported a considerable degree of overlap between male and female preference "in spite of mean differences", and said that earning potential and physical appearance, while being preferences more common in different sexes, were not the highest ranked preference in either. Rather, across sexes the characteristics of "kindness-understanding" and intelligence ranked higher than those of power and attractiveness, suggesting "species-typical mate preferences may be more potent than sex-linked preferences".

== Consensual mate preferences ==
During human evolution, there was a selection pressure to pursue mates who had traits that could yield reproductive success. Those who successfully mated with reproductively fit individuals passed their genes onto the next generation with greater frequency. This sexual selection strengthened the presence of the reproductively beneficial traits themselves as well as the preference for them. The resulting consensual mate preferences refer to the widely shared, cross-cultural judgments regarding the desirable mate qualities that most people, regardless of sex or culture, tend to value.

=== Emotional and cultural qualities ===
Traits such as kindness, dependability, intelligence, and honesty are highly valued among men and women alike. These traits are cues to adaptive behaviors that would likely benefit one's partner and family.

==== Kindness and empathy ====
Kindness, the quality of being nice or friendly, is consistently ranked as one of the top priorities in a mate. Displays of kindness and empathy may indicate a tendency to cooperate with others and place a partner's needs relatively high in processes of decision-making. In addition, kindness can signal greater parenting ability.

==== Intelligence ====
Intelligence is also consistently ranked by men and women as a top priority for a mate. Greater cognitive ability can help partners figure out the complex challenges that may arise when making decisions, managing a household, raising children, and solving everyday problems.

==== Dependability ====
Dependability is preferred by men and women because it communicates a partner's likelihood of maintaining commitment throughout the relationship as well as remaining steady and reliable during difficult times.

==== Social status ====
Many people prefer a mate who maintains a high social status within their community. A mate who is highly respected by others in their social network would be able to gain access to resources and, in turn, confer upon their family.

==== Love ====
Love, the deep emotional bond that underpins long-term romantic relationships, is consistently valued across cultures. It is a human universal and has been suggested to act as a commitment device designed to promote stable pair bonding, cooperation in parenting, and reproductive success.

==== Honesty ====
A mate's honesty is highly valued and preferred by both men and women. Honesty, or the tendency to tell the truth, is a trait that can signal loyalty in many important domains. Honest behavior can reflect the general propensity to act transparently instead of manipulating or exploiting others.

==== Humor ====
Humor, the quality of being funny or entertaining, is widely desired among men and women. Research suggests that humor functions as an honest signal of cognitive capacity, creativity, and social intelligence – qualities that reflect fitness.

=== Physical qualities ===
==== Physical attractiveness and symmetry ====
Physical attractiveness is highly desired among men and women because it functions as a cue to fertility and health. Moreover, a very attractive mate would likely produce offspring that are also attractive, enhancing their fitness. Though men tend to prioritize and prefer physical attractiveness more so than women, it is still a quality that is highly desired by both sexes.

Symmetry is one of the many aspects that factors into attractiveness for both men and women. Both facial and bodily symmetry are considered to be very attractive because they essentially act as a certificate of good health and reproductive potential (developmental stability, genetic diversity, and parasite resistance, for example). Fluctuating asymmetry, or deviation from perfect bilateral evenness, can indicate poor genetic quality and is thus deemed undesirable in a mate. Preference for symmetry in a mate is observed cross-culturally, indicating its robustness as a cue to good health.

Research shows that physically attractive individuals have better sex lives. Symmetry in particular is a good predictor of the number of sex partners one has. Furthermore, more symmetrical men tend to have their first intercourse at an earlier age than do less symmetrical men.

==== Good health ====
A healthy appearance is very desirable in a mate because it can indicate a resilient body that is free from chronic illness/disease with a low exposure to pathogens. Health is an important mate preference, as poor health can be passed onto offspring or to a partner and consequently decrease fitness. Because aspects of health are genetically influenced, it is imperative that one chooses a healthy mate in order to increase the fitness of progeny, both directly and indirectly.

Visible indicators of health include bilateral symmetry, skin condition, and sexual dimorphism. For example, clear skin tone and complexion is broadly considered to be desirable in a mate, functioning as a signal of health and high quality genetics. The presence of sexually dimorphic traits also indicates health, as both estrogen and testosterone (hormones that produce sexually dimorphic traits) are known immunosuppressants. Because these hormones temporarily reduce immune function, only individuals with robust underlying health can afford to produce and maintain strongly sex-typical traits. Thus, a person with sexually dimorphic traits (like a small chin in females or a large jaw in males) signals good health – only those with high genetic quality would be able to develop such masculine or feminine qualities.

=== MHC-correlated mate choice ===
Major histocompatibility complex (MHC) or, in humans, human leukocyte antigen (HLA) produces proteins that are essential for immune system functioning. The genes of the MHC complex have extremely high variability, assumed to be a result of frequency-dependent parasite-driven selection and mate choice. This is believed to be so it promotes heterozygosity improving the chances of survival for the offspring.

==== Odor preferences ====
In humans, there is evidence that women will rate men's odor as more pleasant if the odor has MHC-dissimilar antigens, which is proposed as a way of avoiding inbreeding and increasing heterozygosity. However, women on contraceptive pills rate the odor of MHC-similar men as being more pleasant, it is unknown why women on contraceptive pills rate smell in this way. It was found that when processing MHC-similar smells were processed faster. Contrary to these findings, other studies have found that there is no correlation between attraction and odor by testing males' odor preferences on women's odors. The study concludes that there is no correlation in attraction between men and women of dissimilar HLA proteins. Research completed on a Southern Brazilian student population resulted in similar findings that found significant differences in the attraction ratings of giving to male sweat and MHC-difference.

==== Facial preferences ====
Human facial preferences have been shown to correlate with both MHC-similarity and MHC-heterozygosity. Research into MHC-similarity with regards to facial attractiveness is limited. One study found that women may prefer mates with MHC-similar faces, despite evidence that they prefer men with dissimilar body odors. While facial asymmetry hasn't been correlated with MHC-heterozygosity, the perceived healthiness of skin appears to be. It appears to be that only MHC-heterozygosity and no other genetic markers are correlated with facial attractiveness in males and it has been shown that so far that there is no correlation that has been found in females. Slightly different from facial attractiveness, facial masculinity is not shown to correlate with MHC heterogeneity (a common measure of immunocompetence).

==== Criticisms ====
A review article published in June 2018 concluded that there is no correlation between HLA and mate choice. In addition to assessing previous studies on HLA-Mate choice analysis to identify errors in their research methods (such as small population sizes), the study collects a larger set of data and re-runs the analysis of the previous studies. By using the larger data set to conduct analysis on 30 couples of European descent, they generate findings contrary to previous studies that identified significant divergence in the mate choice with accordance to HLA genotyping. Additional studies have been conducted simultaneously on African and European populations that only show correlation of MHC divergence in European but not African populations.

=== Explanations for consensual preferences ===
==== Relationship satisfaction ====
One prominent theory as to why these preferences are rated as very desirable and important for many people is their association with relationship satisfaction. This theory posits that some qualities (such as kindness or empathy) greatly contribute happiness within the relationship. Unkind or unempathetic partners may decrease relationship satisfaction and, as a result, increase the likelihood of relationship dissolution. Other trivial qualities (such as good housekeeping skills) are deemed less important in a relationship simply because they don't have a significant effect on relationship satisfaction or maintenance.

==== Evolutionary biology ====
Another theory as to why some qualities are consistently desired among men and women is the traits' association with reproductive investment capability. Essentially, this theory states that mate qualities like physical attractiveness or intelligence are considered important and desirable because they are more greatly correlated with parental investment abilities than are traits like good housekeeping skills. As a result, minor traits (such as good housekeeping skills) are not widely desired or prioritized. Ancestral humans who prioritized mate preferences that served proximate cues to reproductive investment capabilities were able to have more offspring and thus propagate their genes with a greater frequency.

Both of these theories are not incompatible. They likely, in fact, work together to strengthen the importance of certain mate preferences from two different angles.

==== Assortative mating ====
Human mating is inherently non-random. Despite the stereotype that "opposite" people attract one another, humans generally prefer mates who share the same or similar traits, such as genetics, quantitative phenotypes like height or body-mass index, skin pigmentation, the level of physical attractiveness, disease risk (including cancers and mental disorders), race or ethnicity, facial features, socioeconomic factors (such as (potential) income level and occupational prestige), cultural backgrounds, moral values, religious beliefs, political orientation, (perceived) personality traits (such as conscientiousness or extraversion), behavioral characteristics (such as the level of generosity or the propensity for alcoholism), educational attainment, and IQ or general intelligence. Furthermore, in the past, marriage across status lines was more common. Women typically looked for a man of high status (hypergamy), a sign of access to resources. Men, for their part, were usually willing to marry down the socioeconomic ladder (hypogamy) if the woman possessed domestic skills, or was young and good looking (proxies of fertility). In the modern world, people tend to desire well-educated and intelligent children; this goal is better achieved by marrying bright people with high incomes, resulting in the intensification of economic assortative mating. Indeed, better educated parents tend to have children who are not only well-educated but also healthy and successful. For this reason, when judging the value of a potential mate, people commonly consider the other person's grasp of grammar (a proxy of socioeconomic status of educational level), teeth quality (indicators of health and age), and self-confidence (psychological stability). Furthermore, the age gap between two partners has also declined. In other words, men and women became more symmetrical in the socioeconomic traits they desire in a mate. Among the aforementioned traits, the correlations in age, race or ethnicity, religion, educational attainment, and intelligence between spouses are the most pronounced, while height is one of the most heritable, with mating partners sharing 89% of the genetic variations affecting the preference for height.

Positive assortative mating raises the chances of a given trait being passed on to the couple's offspring, strengthens the bond between the parents, and increases genetic similarity between family members, whereupon in-group altruism and inclusive fitness are enhanced. That the two partners are culturally compatible reduces uncertainty in lifestyle choices and ensures social support. In some cases, homogamy can also increase the couple's fertility and the number of offspring surviving till adulthood.

On the other hand, there is evolutionary pressure against mating with people too genetically similar to oneself, such as members of the same nuclear family. Humans tend to maximize the genetic similarity of their mates while avoiding excessive inbreeding or incest.

Assortative mating is partly due to social effects, which can have a quantitatively discernible impact upon the human genome and as such has implications for human evolution even in the presence of population stratification. In a knowledge-based economy, educational and socioeconomic assortative mating contributes to the growth in household income inequality, as parents with higher incomes and levels of education tend to invest more in their offspring, giving them an edge later in life.

== Sex-differentiated mate preferences ==
In ancestral environments, men and women faced different selection pressures. Women are highly constrained in their reproductive output because they are limited by gestation and lactation, therefore having significant obligatory parental investment. Men do not have such constraints – they are only limited by the number of fertile mates they have access to and are thus able to sire several children in a year. These asymmetries in parental investment led to differing optimal strategies for maximizing fitness and reproductive success. As such, men and women evolved diverging mate preferences which remain prevalent to this day.

=== Mate preference priorities ===
Mate preference priorities are often measured using budget allocation, a method in which research participants are given a limited number of "dollars" they must distribute to various mate traits, a paradigm which forces them to make decisions about which characteristics are most important to them. This method generally yields two categories of preferences: necessities and luxuries.

==== Necessities ====
One study showed that, when given a small budget, people prioritize mate traits that were ancestrally significant for reproductive success. These traits are thought to be necessities, meaning they are considered essential in a mate.

===== Cross-cultural and sex-differentiated necessities =====
The traits that were viewed as necessities differed among men and women in both Eastern and Western samples.

- Western women placed a higher priority on a partner having good financial prospects, a sense of humor, and a desire for children.
- Western men viewed humor as a necessity.
- Eastern women and men saw good financial opportunities as a necessity in a partner.
- Eastern men rated a partner's religiosity as a necessity.

===== Consensual necessities =====
Despite the observed differences, men and women from various cultural backgrounds consistently placed a high value on kindness and physical attractiveness (though men did allocate a slightly higher amount toward attractiveness).

==== Luxuries ====
When given a large budget, participants allotted resources to traits considered luxuries – qualities that are desirable but nonessential in a partner.

===== Cross-cultural and sex-differentiated luxuries =====
- Western men tended to rate good financial prospects in a mate as a luxury.
- Eastern men and women viewed humor as a luxury.
- Eastern men and women, as well as Western men saw a partner's desire for children as a luxury.
- Eastern women and Western women and men saw religiosity in a mate as a luxury.

===== Consensual luxuries =====
Regardless of sex or cultural background, the participants in this study frequently rated creativity and chastity as luxuries.

=== Female mate choice ===
Although human males and females are both selective in deciding with whom to mate, females exhibit more mate choice selectivity than males, as is seen in nature. Relative to most other animals however, female and male mating strategies are found to be more similar to each other. According to Bateman's principle of Lifespan Reproductive Success (LRS), human females display lower variance in their LRS than males due to their high obligatory parental investment, that is a nine-month gestational period, as well as lactation following birth in order to feed offspring so that their brain can grow to the required size.

Human female sexual selection can be examined by looking at ways in which males and females are sexually dimorphic, especially in traits that serve little other evolutionary purpose. For example, male traits such as the presence of beards, overall lower voice pitch, and average greater height are thought to be sexually selected traits as they confer benefits to either the women selecting for them, or to their offspring. Experimentally, women have reported a preference for men with beards and lower voices.

Female mate choice hinges on many different coinciding male traits, and the trade-off between many of these traits must be assessed. The ultimate traits most salient to female human mate choice, however, are parental investment, resource provision and the provision of good genes to offspring. Many phenotypic traits are thought to be selected for as they act as an indication of one of these three major traits. The relative importance of these traits when considering mate selection differ depending on the type of mating arrangement females engage in. Human women typically employ long-term mating strategies when choosing a mate, however they also engage in short-term mating arrangements, so their mate choice preferences change depending on the function of the type of arrangement.

==== Short-term mating preferences ====
===== Function =====
Women may prefer to acquire a short term mate in some scenarios. There are 4 possible adaptive functions to preference for short-term mating strategies.

One explanation is that she may need to acquire immediate resources, and mating with a man (with the ability to confer benefits) would secure those resources (for her and her children).

Secondly, she may wish to participate in short-term mating in order to acquire good genes for her future child. This is known as the Good Genes Hypothesis. Some lines of evidence suggest that women prefer short-term mates when target mates have indicators of high genetic quality, such as facial symmetry, masculine features, and high physical attractiveness. This is partly explained by the fact that short-term mating is a profitable mating tactic for highly masculine men, and research has found correlations between high levels of masculinity and low levels of romantic/parental investment. Since men who have such cues of high genetic quality may be more inclined to engage in short-term mating, women who want to secure good genes for her offspring must also engage in short-term mating.

Another explanation is that she may be evaluating a short term mate for a possible long-term relationship.

Lastly, she might engage in short term mating during acts of infidelity. In this case, a short-term mating strategy functions as a means to mate switch, an outcome that may occur following an extrapair copulation. Four variants of mate switching have been identified.

- First, a woman may engage in short-term mating in order to acquire a backup mate, acting as a sort of mate insurance if something were to happen to her primary mate.
- Next, she may use short-term mating as a means to facilitate disinvestment in an existing mate.
- Thirdly, a woman could engage in short-term mating in order to acquire a mate who offers greater benefits and fewer costs than her current mate.
- Lastly, a woman may mate in the short-term as a means to evaluate her own mate value and determine whether or not more desirable mates exist in the mating market.

Women's mate choices will also be constrained by the context in which they are making them, resulting in conditional mate choices. Some of the conditions that may influence female mate choice include the woman's own perceived attractiveness, the woman's personal resources, mate copying and parasite stress.

David Buss outlines several hypotheses as to the function of women's short-term mate choices:

- Resource hypothesis: Women may engage in short-term mating in order to gain resources that they may not be able to gain from a long-term partner, or that a long-term partner may not be able to provide consistently. These resources may be food, protection for the woman and her children from aggressive men who may capture or sexually coerce them, or status, by providing the woman with a higher social standing. Women may also benefit from having several short-term mating arrangements through paternity confusion—if the paternity of her offspring is not certain, she may be able to accrue resources from several men as a result of this uncertainty.
- Genetic benefit hypothesis: Women may choose to engage in short-term mating arrangements in order to aid conception if her long-term partner is infertile, to gain superior genes to those of her long-term partner, or to acquire different genes to those of her partner and increase the genetic diversity of her offspring. This relates to what is known as the sexy son hypothesis; if a woman acquires genes from a high quality male, her offspring will likely have higher mate value, resulting in their increased reproductive success.
- Mate expulsion and mate switching: Women may engage in a short-term mating arrangement in order to cause an end to a long-term relationship; in other words, to facilitate a break-up. Women may also use short-term mating if their current partner has depreciated in value, and they wish to 'trade up' and find a partner that they believe has higher value.
- Short-term for long-term goals: Women may use short-term sexual relationships in order to assess a mate's value as a long-term partner, or in the hopes that the short-term arrangement will result in one that is long-term.

===== Masculine physical attractiveness =====
For women, short-term mating (i.e., engagement in low-commitment sexual acts, such as a one-night stand) could be extremely costly due to obligatory parental investment (e.g., gestation, lactation). Because of this, women who engage in short-term mating are motivated to pursue men who have high genetic quality. One indicator of high genetic quality is physical attractiveness and the presence of sexually dimorphic features. In short-term mating, women have exhibited stronger preferences for male physical attractiveness, such as facial symmetry and masculine features (e.g., large jaw, prominent eyebrows).

These sexually dimorphic features are highly desired because they function as an honest immunocompetence handicap signal. Masculinity acts as cue to testosterone exposure, which signals high genetic quality due to testosterone's immunosuppressant effects. Because testosterone suppresses the immune system, only men with good immune systems would be able to develop these masculine secondary sex characteristics. Therefore, women are attracted to such dimorphic features because they indicate high quality genes that would be passed onto offspring.

It is proposed that this preference for sexually dimorphic features is stronger in short-term mating strategies because the male's high genetic quality is traded off for parental investment. Some evidence backs this up, as researchers have found links between high levels of masculinity and low levels of investment. For instance, high testosterone men are less likely to get married, and when they do, they tend to have more marital problems and higher rates of divorce than low testosterone men.

===== Local pathogen threat =====
Local pathogen threat is a significant influence in female preference for a masculine partner. Because the presence of masculine features in men is indicative of a good immune system, exposure to pathogen cues is shown to be associated with stronger preferences for male facial masculinity among women. Across a variety of cultures, it has been found that pathogen load is positively correlated with importance of partner physical attractiveness. This is further supported by data that reports females more strongly prefer masculinity in places with poorer health statuses, such as high mortality and disease rates. It has also been found that women with high sensitivity to pathogen disgust exhibit stronger preferences for masculinity.

Indeed, it has been found that men who are more masculine tend to have a higher number of sexual partners. Research shows that men with broad shoulders relative to hips (a highly sexually dimorphic quality correlated with testosterone) tend to lose their virginity at a younger age, have more sex mates, have more affairs, and have more sex with other people's mates as compared to men with lower shoulder-to-hip ratios.

==== Long-term mating preferences ====
===== Resources and financial prospects =====
A man's reproductive investment is highly tied to his ability to attain and confer benefits for the family. Because women pay the enormous cost of pregnancy and child rearing, ancestral women needed to solve the problem of provisioning enough food for herself and her children. Given this, ancestral women would have placed extreme importance on a mate's ability to forage, hunt, and provide meat (i.e., give benefits to her and her offspring). Today, this translates to a man's ability to bring in economic resources and provide for the family monetarily. Monetary privilege allows access to resources that may provide material and social advantages to offspring. Indeed, many lines of evidence from various cultures suggest that, on average, women prefer men who possess economic resources and good financial prospects.

Multiple studies have shown that this preference occurs in real mating behavior: women are more likely to select mates who have greater ability to confer economic benefits. For example, speed dating studies have shown that women are more inclined to select mates who grew up in an affluent neighborhood and had higher levels of both education and income. Another study found that women in Kenya preferentially select mates who have lots of land. Indeed, married men consistently have higher levels of income than single men of the same age. In addition, one cross-cultural study found that inadequate economic support was a frequent cause of divorce as reported by females. Divorce due to a lack of economic support never occurred among males.

The provision of economic resources, or the potential to acquire many economic resources, is the most obvious cue towards the ability of a man to provide resources, and women in the United States have been shown experimentally to rate the importance of their partner's financial status more highly than men.

===== Emotional stability =====
If a woman's long-term partner is not emotionally stable or is not dependable then their provision of resources to her and her offspring are likely to be inconsistent. Additionally, the costs associated with an emotionally unstable partner such as jealousy and manipulation may outweigh the benefits associated with the resources they are able to provide.

===== Love =====
Romantic love is the mechanism through which long-term mate choice occurs in human females.

===== Ambition, industry, and social status =====
In line with female preference for a mate's economic resources and financial prospects, women cross-culturally have shown preference for a mate's ambition, industriousness, and social status. For example, one study found that women rated high-status men as significantly more attractive than lower-status men. These qualities would have, again, signaled the ability of a mate to provide for a woman and her offspring.

There is lots of evidence that this preference translates into real life mating behavior. For instance, mail-order brides from a variety of countries were more likely to select men who had higher levels of status and ambition. Another study found that women were more likely to seek out mates who owned a car and placed importance on their career.

===== Protection =====
Because ancestral women were more susceptible to dangerous others, they evolved preferences for mates that signal both the ability and willingness to protect. Qualities such as dominance, a larger body size, physical formidability, athleticism, and bravery are all highly valued among women. For example, women have shown strong preferences for males who are muscular and lean with a broad chest and V-shaped torso (broad shoulders relative to hips). Many lines of evidence show that women strongly prefer tall men over short men because they are seen as more dominant and physically formidable.

Tall men are more likely to date, get responses on dating ads, and acquire highly attractive partners. Also, men with a high shoulder-to-hip ratio are shown to have more sex partners. Moreover, men who are perceived as dominant copulate earlier in life than their counterparts.

===== Age =====
Cross-culturally, women have shown a strong preference for men who are older than themselves. One prominent reason for this is that older men typically have greater economic security and social status than younger men. Research has shown that women actually prefer a larger age gap than do men, with an average ideal preference of 3.42 years older. Older males have had more time to accrue resources.

Multiple studies have shown that age preferences are actualized in real-world relationships. For example, many women report having a partner older than themselves. Consistently across cultures and centuries, women date and marry men who are a few years older than themselves.

===== Costs =====
The primary cost of employing a long-term mating strategy among women is having to forgo short-term mating opportunities and the previously described benefits they might bring.

===== Benefits =====
There are many benefits of using a long-term mating strategy for women. Namely, a woman's long-term mate can secure status and resources for herself and her offspring. Also, having a long-term mate can ensure the physical protection of herself and her family. Lastly, employing a long-term mating strategy can ensure enhanced mating success of the offspring by means of the material and social benefits acquired from a father.

=== Male mate choice ===
==== Short-term mating preferences ====
===== Physical attractiveness =====
When finding a short-term mate, males highly value women with sexual experience and physical attractiveness. Men who are interested in a short-term sexual relationship are more likely to prioritise information about the body of potential partners, rather than their faces. When finding a female for a short-term relationship, compared with a long-term relationship, males are less likely to prioritise factors such as commitment.

===== Variety =====
Men have evolved stronger preferences for sexual variety than women, mostly due to the fact that parental investment is not nearly as costly for men. Men, then, should be highly motivated to acquire as many mates as possible – the only constraint to his reproductive success is the number of fertile mates he has access to. As a result, studies show that men, moreso than women, express a strong desire for short-term mates and want a greater number of sexual partners. Indeed, men in many countries maintain more permissive attitudes towards casual sex than do women. In comparison to women, men prefer to have sex sooner and are more willing to loosen their preference standards while seeking casual sex.

A preference for sexual variety is actualized in men's real mating behavior in several ways. For example, men tend to feel less sexual regret than women – they are less likely to be upset following a casual hookup. In addition, men are more likely than women to feel regret regarding missed sexual opportunities. Substantially more men than women will agree to have sex with a stranger, a finding that has been replicated across many countries. Cross-culturally, men solicit prostitutes far more than women do, with 99% of sex worker patrons being male. Moreover, men often report that their ideal outcome of a short-term mating experience is more sex, while women describe their ideal outcome to be a romantic relationship. On top of this, men have been shown to employ tactics of deception in order to obtain short-term sex, such as faking interest in a long-term romantic relationship. Furthermore, married men are more likely than married women to have affairs and with a greater number of partners. Findings in support of men's engagement in acts involving increased sexual variety have been replicated cross-culturally.

Men seeking short-term sexual relationships are likely to avoid women who are interested in commitment or require investment. In short-term sexual relationships, men are less choosy because of low parental investment. When looking for short-term sexual relationships, men may wish for there to be as little time as possible between each partner.

===== Lower standards =====
It has been reported that men are more likely to engage in a sexual relationship with women who have lower levels of intelligence, independence, honesty, generosity, athleticism, responsibility and cooperativeness, when this relationship is short-term. Men may be more accepting of lower standards, than what they usually prefer, because they are not entering a long-term relationship with this person.

===== Sexual experience =====
Many men assume that women who have engaged in sexual experiences beforehand are likely to have a higher sex drive than women who haven't. These women may also be more accessible and require less courtship.

===== Exploitability =====
Men who employ a short-term mating strategy are more attracted to women who possess indicators of sexual exploitability. Appearing to be immature, under the influence, flirtatious, sleepy, and wearing revealing clothing are preferred by men seeking casual sex because they are believed to be cues that a woman can be easily seduced. Men who desire a short-term mate are substantially more attracted to these qualities than men seeking a long-term mate. In fact, these sexual exploitability indicators are not preferred (and are found to be unattractive) by men employing a long-term mating strategy.

==== Long-term mating preferences ====
===== Reproductive value =====
Ancestral men who had successfully pursued a fertile mate passed down their genes with a higher frequency. As a result, men evolved preferences for cues that historically correlated with a woman's reproductive value. Reproductive value is not directly observable in women due to concealed ovulation, so it must be inferred through visible qualities. In fact, physical appearance contains lots of information about a person, like their age and health status. Most men today are attracted to women who signal high reproductive value, inferred through her age and physically healthy/attractive appearance.

===== Attractiveness =====
Indicators of relative youth and health are substantial predictors of female attractiveness judgments by men. Indeed, on average men report preferences for a long-term mate who is beautiful and neotonous.

Physical qualities considered attractive by men include traditionally feminine and youthful features, such as full lips, facial adiposity, small chin, thin jaws, high cheekbones, clear/supple skin, facial symmetry, and clear/large eyes. These feminine facial features are believed to be associated with high estrogen levels, a hormone that is linked to fertility and tends to decline with age.

Other physical qualities preferred by men are healthy hair, lively gait, bodily symmetry, and firm/symmetrical breasts.

One prominent mate preference among men is a low waist-to-hip ratio (hourglass figure). A low waist-to-hip ratio is highly important as it is one of the best visible cues to fecundity. In fact, it has been found that congenitally blind men show preference for a low waist-to-hip ratio in a mate, indicating that the hourglass figure is a robust indicator of reproductive value.

Observable characteristics of a woman can indicate good health and the ability to reproduce, qualities which are likely to be desired by a male. This may include smooth skin, absence of lesions, muscle tone, long hair and high energy levels. Women with darker features (lips, eyes, eyebrows) relative to their facial skin have been found to be more attractive, as this increases facial contrast (the same features appear to decrease male attractiveness).

A Waist-to-hip ratio of 0.7 is an indicator of fertility, lower long-term health risks and suggests that the woman isn't already pregnant. A male is likely to desire these qualities in a mate, as it will increase the chance of survival of any offspring the couple have together.

The pigmentation of nipples and breasts appears to be the most important quality of breast attractiveness. Men rated women with dark nipples and dark areola as significantly more attractive than those with light-colored nipples or areola. Breasts of medium cup size were found to be the most attractive, however authors noted that men focused primarily on the coloration of nipples and areola rather than breast size.

===== Youth =====
Numerous studies point to the fact that men prefer a mate who is younger than themselves. The ideal age for a mate according to one sample of men is approximately 2.66 years younger.

Many lines of evidence support the notion that men acquire mates who are physically attractive and youthful. Typically, men who are of high status are able to actualize their preferences and, in turn, secure the most attractive mates. Across different centuries and cultures, it has been found that men with high-income, high status jobs (kings, CEOs, famous actors and musicians, etc.) often acquire spouses and mistresses who are substantially younger and more physically attractive than the average woman.

In addition, cross-cultural marriage statistics throughout time show that women are typically younger than their partners by anywhere from 3 to 10 years. This age gap increases as men get older– the age of their mate becomes increasingly younger. Furthermore, data from foreign bride purchases showed that men tended to select considerably younger mates for marriage.

Other behavioral data also points to a preference fulfillment for younger mates among men. For example, in cultures that take part in bridewealth practices, the age of a potential wife impacts the amount of money spent, with younger wives getting higher amounts of money. It has also been shown that men tend to spend more money on engagement rings for younger brides. Research also indicates that mate guarding tactics are more strongly employed for younger women.

Both young and old men are attracted to women in their twenties. Faces that appear younger are usually rated as more attractive by males.

===== Fidelity =====
Sexual fidelity, or the propensity to remain sexually devoted to one's partner, is highly valued by men and regularly placed among their top priorities in a mate. Such loyalty indicates a woman's commitment to the relationship, reducing the likelihood of partner defection. Remaining sexually faithful is very desirable for men because it protects against the substantial fitness costs associated with betrayal, such as cuckoldry, thereby increasing paternity certainty.

===== Commitment =====
Humans have the ability to rely on biological signals of reproductive success and non-biological signals, such as the female's willingness to marry. Unlike many animals, humans are not able to consciously display physical changes to their body when they are ready to mate, so they have to rely on other forms of communication before engaging in a consensual relationship. Romantic love is the mechanism through which long-term mate choice occurs in human males. For long-term sexual relationships, men are usually equally choosy because they have a similar parental investment like the women, as they heavily invest in the offspring in form of resource provisioning.

A human male may be interested in mating with a female who seeks marriage. This is because he has exclusive sexual access to the female, so any offspring produced in the relationship will be genetically related to him (unless the female has sexual intercourse with another male outside of the marriage). This increases the likelihood of paternity certainty. With two married parents investing in the offspring, their chance of survival may increase; therefore the male's DNA will be passed on to the children of his offspring. Also, a male who is interested in committing to a female may be more attractive to potential mates. A male who can promise resources and future parental investment is likely to be more appealing to women than a male who is unwilling to commit to her.

- Facial symmetry: Symmetrical faces have been judged to signal good general health and the ability for a woman to withstand adverse environmental factors, such as illness.
- Femininity: A feminine face can be a signal of youth, which in turn signals strong reproductive value. As a woman gets older, her facial features become less feminine due to ageing. Femininity can also be linked to disease-resistance and high estrogen levels, which are factors that suggest reproductive value to a potential mate.

==== Long-term mating strategies for men ====
===== Costs =====
In line with the costs for women, a long-term mating strategy for men may be costly because he must relinquish other short-term sexual opportunities.

===== Benefits =====
There are many benefits to pursuing a long-term mating strategy for men. One benefit is that he may utilize a woman's lifetime reproductive means. In doing so, a man may gain paternity certainty. Furthermore, he may enhance the fitness of his offspring via parental investment and strengthen social power via his alliances with his partner's family. Given the fact that many women require commitment prior to engaging in a sexual relationship, a man may benefit from employing a long-term mating strategy by simply increasing the chance of attaining a mate at all.

=== Individual differences ===
==== Sociosexual Orientation Inventory ====
Just as there are differences between the sexes in mating strategies, there are differences within the sexes and such within-sex variation is substantial. Individual differences in mating strategies are commonly measured using the Sociosexual Orientation Inventory (SOI), a questionnaire that includes items assessing past sexual behavior, anticipated future sexual behavior, and openness to casual sex. Higher scores on the SOI indicate a sexually unrestricted mating strategy, which indicates an openness to casual sex and more partners. Conversely, lower scores on the SOI indicate a sexually restricted mating strategy, which a focus on higher commitment and fewer partners.

Several studies have found that scores on the SOI are related to mate preferences, with more sexually restricted individuals preferring personal/parenting qualities in a mate (e.g. responsibility and loyalty), and with less sexual restricted individual preferring qualities related to physical attractiveness and social visibility. Other studies have shown that SOI scores are related to personality traits (i.e. extraversion, erotophilia, and low agreeableness), conspicuous consumption in men as a means to attract women, and increased allocation of visual attention to attractive opposite-sex faces.

==== Short-term vs. long-term mating ====
Evolutionary psychologists have proposed that individuals adopt conditional mating strategies in which they adjust their mating tactics to relevant environmental or internal conditions, which is called strategic pluralism. The concept of sexual pluralism states that humans do not pursue the same mating strategy all of the time. There are different motivations and environmental influences that determine the mating strategy which a person will adopt. The long-term and short-term mating behaviors are triggered in the individual by the current strategy being pursued.

== Impact of and on culture ==
=== Adolescent behavior ===
Young males (who have the highest reproductive variance) take more risks than any other group in both experiments and observations. By undertaking risky endeavors, males are thought to signal the qualities which may be directly related to one's ability to provision and protect one's family, namely, physical skill, good judgment, or bravery. Social dominance, confidence, and ambition could help in competition among other males, while social dominance, ambition, and wealth might alleviate the costs of failure. In addition, traits like bravery and physical prowess may also be valued by cooperative partners due to their benefits in group-hunting and warfare, thereby increasing the potential audience for risk takers.

=== Cultural traditions and popular culture ===
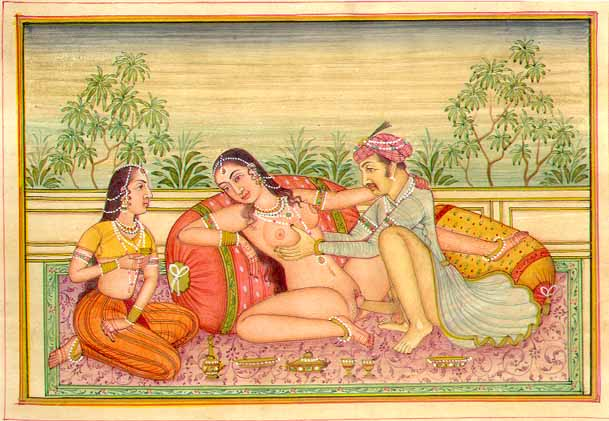
An illustration from the Kama Sutra, published in India in the 3rd century A.D.

It remains unclear how culture modulates sex differences in mate choice. Cultural variations in mate preference can be due to the evolved sex differences in a given culture. Since physical attractiveness is thought to signal health and disease resistance, evolutionary psychologists have predicted that, in societies high in pathogen prevalence, people value attractiveness more in a mate, and cross-cultural data substantiates this claim. Women in nations with high pathogen prevalence also show greater preferences for facial masculinity. Furthermore, since sexual contact with multiple individuals increases the risk of disease transmission, thereby increasing the costs of pursuing a short-term mating strategy, higher pathogen prevalence is associated with lower national SOI scores. Finally, several studies have found that experimentally manipulating disease salience has a causal influence on attractiveness preferences and SOI scores in predicted directions.

=== Consumer psychology ===
One way to signal one's socioeconomic status is conspicuous consumption, or when individuals purchase luxurious items which provide little to no utility over less costly versions, thereby prioritizing self-promotion over economic sense. For instance, in France, the hoarding of flour for cosmetic purposes was a common practice, even during times of food shortages, up until the French Revolution. It is a common behavior of class and often involves strategic planning to maximize the audience of the display and the strength of the signal. Most signaling explanations of conspicuous consumption predict the targets of the signal will predominately be potential mates. Among males, the information signaled is thought to go beyond genetic quality and signal the potential for investment, which can be attractive to those seeking both long-term and short-term mating strategies. Among females, a suggested to benefit from conspicuous consumption in mating contexts is its hypothesized ability to demonstrate the commitment of one's partner and signal one's mate quality to rivals, both of which may help in intrasexual competition and deter mate poaching.

== See also ==
- Assortative mating
- Sexual economics
- Sexual selection
- Sexual strategies theory
- Sexual value
- Evolutionary psychology
- Intersexual selection
- Parental investment theory
- Mate value
- Mate guarding
- Life history theory
- Good genes hypothesis
- Sexual dimorphism
- Facial symmetry
- Physical attractiveness
- Cross-cultural psychology
