= Sexual strategies theory =

Theory of human evolution

Sexual strategies theory (SST) is an evolutionary theory of human mating created by David Buss and David Schmitt in 1993. It defines the set of mating strategies that humans pursue, the adaptive problems that men and women face when pursuing these strategies, and the evolved solutions to these mating problems.

== Introduction ==
In 1993, David Buss and David Schmitt proposed sexual strategies theory as an extension of parental investment theory (1972) by Robert Trivers. Strategies are defined as behavioural solutions to adaptive problems. It does not imply conscious planning or awareness by the individual. Buss explained: "It may seem odd to view human mating, romance, sex, and love as inherently strategic. But humans, like other sexually reproducing species, do not choose mates randomly. We do not attract mates indiscriminately."

Before SST, human mating theories focused almost exclusively on long-term mating and neglected short-term mating as a common feature in most cultures. SST begins with two critical variables that influence mating behaviour. The first is the temporal dimension (time span), which ranges from short-term to long-term mating. Short-term mating involves relatively fleeting sexual encounters such as casual sex, one-night stands, and brief affairs. Long-term mating is a prolonged commitment to a partner that lasts years, decades, or a lifetime. Matings of intermediate duration, which may involve dating, "going steady", and brief marriages, fall between these points. The second variable is biological sex: whether one is male or female.

== Premises ==
SST has 12 core premises:

1. Humans have evolved multiple mating strategies.
2. Each strategy has specialised design features.
3. Men and women are strategically similar in some domains.
4. Men and women differ in strategies where they have recurrently faced different adaptive problems.
5. Sex differences in minimum obligatory parental investment and sexual selection have fashioned sex-differentiated forms of short-term mating.
6. Access to fertile women has historically been a key constraint on men's reproductive success, so selection has favoured a psychology of short-term mating specially designed to overcome this constraint.
7. Women obtain several key adaptive benefits from short-term mating.
8. Men and women have evolved long-term pair-bonded mating strategies that possess at least five common components. They are identifying potential partners who have: (a) a similar mate value as their own; (b) a willingness to commit over the long-term; (c) good long-term partner qualities including an altruistically skewed welfare trade-off ratio (WTR); (d) good parenting skills; and (e) are not encumbered by costly commitments.
9. There are male-specific challenges of long-term mating.
10. There are female-specific challenges of long-term mating.
11. The deployment of different sexual strategies is highly context dependent.
12. Sexual strategies are evolved solutions to common and sex-differentiated challenges of human mating.

== Contextual influences ==
Many factors influence mating strategies. When there is a female-skewed operational sex ratio, men tend to shift to brief encounters since they have more opportunities to satisfy their desire for variety. Conversely, when there is a surplus of men, both sexes shift towards a long-term mating strategy. A male surplus also predicts polyandry. The dark triad of personality traits—narcissism, Machiavellianism, and psychopathy—is associated with exploitative short-term mating tactics, deception, and coercion. When there is a greater prevalence of parasites, people place more importance on physical attractiveness since parasites are known to degrade physical appearance.

== Alternative explanations ==
Social role theory (or the social structural model) is a rival theory by Alice Eagly and Wendy Wood. According to Fletcher et al. (2019):

Unlike sexual strategies theory, the social structural model posits that evolutionary forces did not produce psychological adaptations in the mind or brain that direct the way in which women and men make decisions about sex and mating. Thus, sexual selection occurred below the neck. [...] Differences between these theories have led to some lively exchanges in the literature. Both theories have their limitations, but, given the evidence... we believe that sexual selection processes over the long course of evolution was likely to have molded both the body and the mind (or brain) in humans. Although culture certainly plays a major role in influencing sexual strategies, biological evolution has left its footprints all over both the intimate relationship body and mind.

Contrary to the predictions of social role theory, sex differences tend to be larger in more gender egalitarian cultures.

== Bibliography ==
- Buss, David M.; Schmitt, David P. (2018). "Mate Preferences and Their Behavioral Manifestations". Annual Review of Psychology 70: 23.1–23.34. doi:10.1146/annurev-psych-010418-103408.
