= Sexual jealousy =

Psychological concept

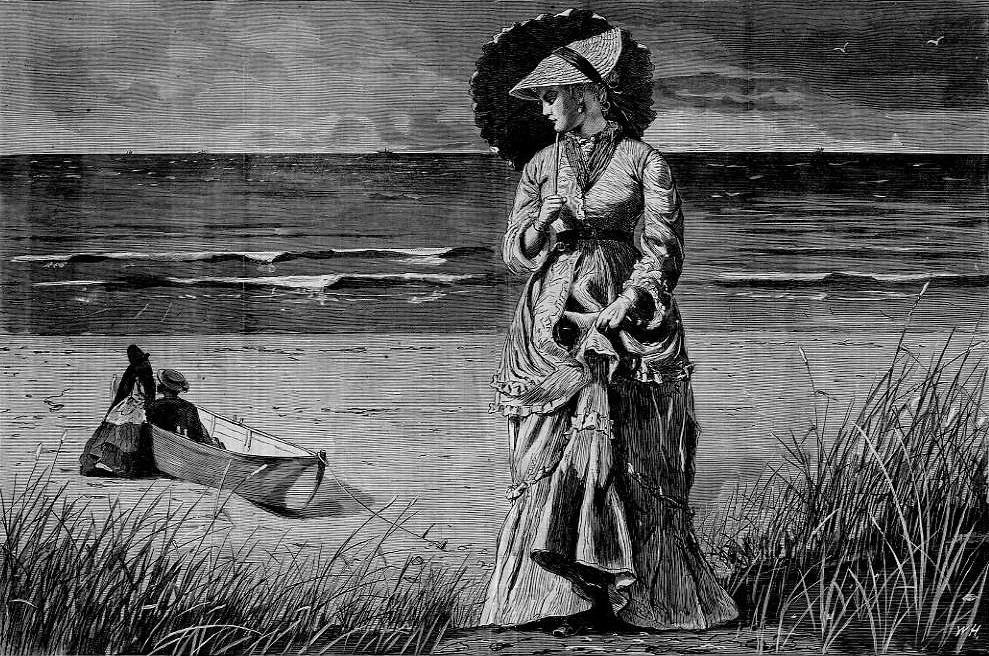
Two are Company, Three Are None, 1872, a wood engraving by Winslow Homer

Sexual jealousy is a special form of jealousy in sexual relationships, based on suspected or imminent sexual infidelity. The concept is studied in the field of evolutionary psychology.

== Basis ==
Evolutionary psychologists have suggested that there is a gender difference in sexual jealousy, driven by men and women's different reproductive biology. The theory proposes that a man perceives a threat to his relationship's future because he could be fooled into raising children that are not his own. In contrast, a woman risks losing to another the relationship and all the benefits that entails. Research has shown that men are impacted more by sexual infidelity, while women are more impacted by emotional infidelity.

An alternative explanation is from a social-cognitive perspective. Typically, men place importance on their masculinity and sexual dominance. When the male's partner commits sexual infidelity, these two components of his ego become severely threatened. Women are more emotionally invested in a relationship, and therefore experience a threat to their self-perception when a partner commits infidelity, more concerned with risk to the emotional content than the sexual.

Some research has suggested that there are no gender differences in sexual jealousy, concluding that males and females both equally experience distress over emotional and sexual infidelity. Sexual jealousy is cross-culturally universal but how it manifests itself may differ across cultures.

== Gender-specific behaviors ==
=== Female ===
Are You Jealous? by Paul Gauguin. Based on a real-life episode during Gauguin's stay on Tahiti, the painting shows two Tahitian women.

Psychologists have found that males react very strongly to sexual infidelity, whereas females are more likely to forgive a one-time sexual adventure if it does not threaten the male parental investment. Therefore, jealousy is likely to be evoked in females if they feel that their partner may leave them for another woman; this has been shown to be more likely to occur if the male commits emotional infidelity. Emotional infidelity occurs when one partner develops a meaningful, emotional attachment with someone outside of their primary romantic relationship.

==== Emotional jealousy ====
Many studies have shown that females tend to place a stronger emphasis on the emotional aspect of infidelity over the sexual aspect; it is this emotional infidelity that becomes the focus of female sexual jealousy. The most direct evidence for female's focus on emotional jealousy comes from Buss et al. (1992) who presented participants with scenarios in which they were asked to choose between a partner's sexual unfaithfulness and a partner's emotional unfaithfulness as the most distressing event. They found that more females than males reported a partner's emotional infidelity as the most distressing event. As well as using self-report measures, the researchers measured the participants' physiological responses (heart rate and electrodermal activity) to the scenarios; women were also found to be more physiologically upset to the idea of their partners committing emotional infidelity.

=== Male ===
Male sexual jealousy functions to defend paternity confidence, and is likely to have evolved through natural selection to prevent cuckoldry — a threat to males since they risk expending resources to support the biological offspring of others. The male reaction stereotypically manifests as the emotion of jealousy, using or threatening violence to protect sexual exclusivity, and thus the inclination to control women. This idea of males ensuring sexual exclusivity has also led to laws on adultery.

From an evolutionary perspective, sexual jealousy arises from this threat of investing in non-biologically related offspring and thus is most strongly felt over their mate's sexual infidelity than their emotional infidelity. It can take several forms in behaviour: aggression and violence, and possessiveness or controlling behaviour towards their mate. In some cases, sexual jealousy can lead to uxoricide. Threats to a relationship can arise from other sources too, such as the presence of rivals, cues to infidelity, and partner dissatisfaction with the relationship. Morbid jealousy is also concurrent with male sexual jealousy – an obsession with thoughts of a partner's suspected sexual infidelity. A 2012 meta-analysis found that sexual jealousy in males can also lead to emotions such as distress, hurt and disgust being experienced.

== Expression ==
=== Expression in females ===
==== Aggression ====
While most empirical research suggests that males are more likely to act aggressively in response to sexual jealousy, some studies have shown that females may also display aggression and violence.

Women have been found to report that their hypothetical sexual jealousy would manifest itself as anger and physical aggression towards the man. It has been suggested that this is because women are more empathetic towards the "victim", triggering strong aggression towards the unfaithful man. However, it is not known if these hypothetical reports would become actions in real life situations. On the other hand, research shows that women are as likely to be violent in intimate partnerships as men, in contrast to society at large.

Because it is the woman who ultimately chooses the mate, aggression caused by infidelity may be directed at the rival female. As a result, when a woman is around a suspected rival female, she may be more likely than a male counterpart to announce that her companion is "taken" and go out of her way to enhance her appearance to her spouse.

==== Self-blame ====
Following infidelity, women are more likely to focus their sexual jealousy on their own relationship and self-blame. They are also more likely to experience symptoms of depression following the infidelity. Evidence for the interpretation that in jealousy situations women focus more on their own functioning as a partner comes from research by Dijkstra and Buunk (2002). This research suggests that unlike men's jealousy, women's jealousy stems more from comparing their own qualities with those of the rival. The higher the level of social comparison, a personality characteristic referring to the tendency to compare one's characteristics with those of others, the more jealousy various rival characteristics evoked.

=== Expression in males ===
==== Mate guarding behaviour ====
One form of male sexual jealousy is mate guarding. This tactic is used to prevent partner infidelity and thus may be used when there are perceived threats in the environment. It results in several behaviours, and researchers have documented up to 19 tactics used. This includes (but is not exclusive to):

- Violence (or at least hostility) directed towards competitors,
- Taking up all of the mate's time so that they have no time to meet other potential mates,
- Emotionally manipulating their mate,
- Increase their possession signals with jewelry, clothing, cars, etc.,
- Enhancing their appearance (e.g. fixing their hair, clothing, etc.).

=== Attachment style ===
According to attachment theory, the quality of a child's interactions with caregivers during times of need shape their future interactions; this includes later relationships. Research has shown that insecure-avoidant individuals tend to report more sexual jealousy than those who are securely attached. This may be due to the fact that, in comparison to securely attached individuals, those who are insecurely attached tend to experience lower levels of trust, intimacy and stability in their romantic relationships. Evidence suggests that people who experience low self-esteem are much more afraid that their partner is dissatisfied and being unfaithful, which again increases the likelihood that they will experience sexual jealousy.

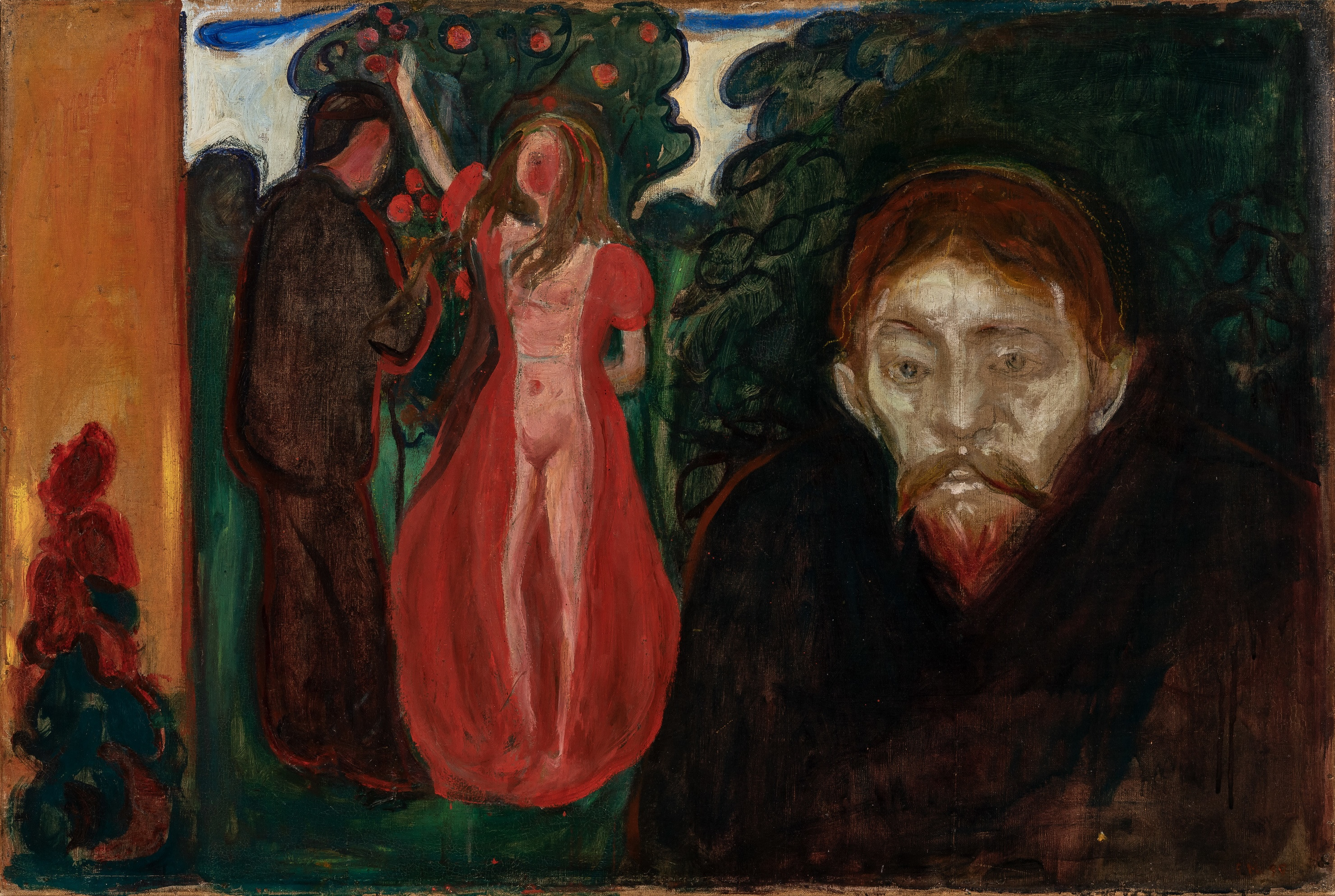
Jealousy by Edvard Munch

=== Sex drive ===
Sex drive, also known as libido, is the physiological need for sexual activity. Sex drive has been found to be a significant predictor of higher sexual jealousy in both men and women; those who had a higher sex drive showed greater distress at the idea of their partner committing sexual infidelity. This is consistent with other empirical research that has shown that individuals who value sexual gratification highly were more likely to be distressed by sexual infidelity. To explain this finding, researchers have suggested the key threat that sexual infidelity poses for individuals with a high sex drive is loss of access to sexual gratification, as their partner is granting sexual access to a third person.

=== Relationship quality ===
Research has shown that individuals who reported high jealousy scores had more stable and successful relationships than individuals who reported comparatively low jealousy scores. Furthermore, individuals in committed relationships tend to experience higher levels of jealousy than individuals in less committed relationships. To explain this, researchers have proposed that those in better quality, more committed relationships would have more to lose if their partner were to leave them for someone else, and therefore worry more about infidelity. Therefore, such individuals experience greater sexual jealousy if they feel the relationship is threatened.

== Explanations ==
Researchers have proposed a number of theories to explain sexual jealousy in both males and females. In addition, some of these explanations can be used to explain the sex differences in sexual jealousy and why there may be differences in the degree to which people experience jealousy.

=== Evolutionary psychology perspective ===
Evolutionary psychologists propose that the core function of sexual jealousy is to retain access to a valuable mate. This explanation is known as jealousy as a specific innate module, "JSIM". According to this perspective, sexual jealousy should be activated by threats to the relationship; in particular, threats of sexual infidelity by the female and threats that the male may share his resources (money, protection, or time) with another woman. For males, their biggest concern when they commit to a relationship is ensuring that any offspring produced is biologically theirs, therefore, sexual infidelity is a huge threat to them as there is then a chance that they are not the genetic parent. If a male raises a child that is not genetically his own, he has effectively wasted his resources raising another man's child who will not pass on any of his genes.

As women have genetic certainty when they bear a child, this is not a concern to them. However, they do face a different evolutionary problem. If the woman's partner becomes emotionally attached to another woman, there is a real chance that the male may share his resources with the other woman or leave their current relationship altogether. Either way, the female loses some of the male parental investment, and the loss of her mate's resources may significantly reduce the survival of herself and her offspring.

The evolutionary psychology perspective has been supported by a study conducted by David Buss. He observed that male sexual jealousy is triggered by sexual infidelity, whereas female sexual jealousy is triggered by emotional infidelity. The study concluded that sexual jealousy may be an adaptive function that is triggered in order to retain access to a valuable mate.

Researchers David Buss and Todd Shackleford propose and test several hypotheses about sexual jealousy:

1. Men will devote more resources to mate retention when their partner is younger than them than men whose partner is older than them. This hypothesis rests on the evolutionary principle of mate value. Younger women are likely to have more mate value because they are more fertile. Therefore, it is predicted that men are likely to engage in mate retention behaviours more often when their partner is younger rather than older than them.
2. Again based on the principle of mate value is the prediction that men will devote more resources to mate retention when their partner is perceived to be more physically attractive than when their partner is perceived to be less physically attractive. Females who are physically attractive have a higher mate value than those who are less physically attractive.
3. Women will allocate more resources to mate retention when their partner has a wealth of resources than women whose partners have few resources. This hypothesis also rests on the mate value principle. Men who have more resources and wealth have a higher mate value than those who do not.
4. If a man perceives his partner as having a higher mate value than him, then he is more likely to engage in efforts towards mate retention than men who perceive their partners as having a lower or equal mate value than them. This hypothesis rests on perceived mate value. If a male's partner has a higher mate value than him, she is more likely to be able to attract other men who may be of a similar mate value to her. As such, the male is at a greater risk of losing her to another man with a higher mate value.
5. Individuals who suspect their partners are being unfaithful are more likely to devote effort towards mate retention than those who do not suspect their partners are being unfaithful. This hypothesis relies on the perceived probability of infidelity. Men risk being cuckolded into raising children that are not genetically theirs, and women risk losing their mate's resources and time.

Their research provided evidence to support all above hypotheses except for hypothesis 5; this effect was unique to men only. This suggests that a woman who suspects her male partner of being unfaithful is not necessarily more likely to devote more effort to retaining them:

One could speculate that a partner's sexual infidelity signals less of a loss for women than for men given the reproductive logic of paternity uncertainty, but this explanation does not square with the findings that women become just as upset as men by a partner's infidelity, particularly when it represents a serious, emotionally involved relationship (Buss et al., 1992).

=== The double-shot hypothesis ===
This hypothesis contradicts the evolutionary perspective. It proposes that these gender differences in feelings of sexual jealousy stem from beliefs as opposed to being evolved traits.

The double-shot hypothesis (also known as the two-for-one hypothesis) suggests that women have a belief that men can have sexual relations without emotionally committing themselves. Women also believe that for men to have emotional commitment, sex is a prerequisite. Therefore, if men and women place importance on different aspects of relationship, this explains why they may also be upset by different types of sexual jealousy differently.

=== Social-cognitive perspective ===
As both forms of jealousy are threatening to men and women, the social-cognitive perspective suggests that there are no inherent, evolutionarily induced gender differences. Instead, both emotional and sexual jealousy are believed to occur when an individual believes that a rival is posing a threat to what one perceives to be a valuable interpersonal relationship. When the relationship or one's self-esteem is threatened, jealousy is evoked.

The perspective also provides explanations as to why men would be more upset by sexual infidelity than women. Men are socialized to be masculine, which includes having great sexual prowess. If a man's partner commits sexual infidelity, this brings into question his sexual prowess and therefore threatens his masculinity. This results a strong, negative reaction in response to the sexual infidelity, which does not tend to occur in response to emotional infidelity. In contrast, women are taught to be emotional nurturers in a relationship, therefore, if their partner commits emotional infidelity, this may threaten her sense of self more than if her partner commits sexual infidelity.

The social-cognitive perspective also proposes the transactional model of jealousy, which can be used to explain why there may be differences in the degree to which individuals experience sexual jealousy within genders, as well as between genders. This model examines how three variables – (1) arousability, (2) commitment and, (3) insecurity – moderate jealousy.

1. Individual differences in sexual jealousy are determined by the difference in levels of physiological arousal: individuals who are easily aroused have more intense jealous reactions than those with lower physiological arousal
2. Commitment refers to the degree of dedication a person has in the relationship: the more committed a person is to a relationship, the greater the threat of loss, which leads to greater feelings of jealousy
3. Insecurity refers to the perceived level of commitment of the partner: if we perceive our partner to be un-involved or disinterested in the relationship, we feel more insecure.

The degree to which these factors are experienced together determine the intensity of sexual jealousy felt by an individual.

== Culture ==
Sexual jealousy is cross-culturally universal in industrialised countries and affects both men and women. However, the extent of sexual jealousy varies across cultures. Sexual jealousy is strongly mediated by culture in both heterosexual and homosexual couples. It is said to be prevalent in males who are from patriarchal cultures (where heritability runs through the male side).

=== Evocation ===
There are cross-cultural differences in behaviours that evoke sexual jealousy. Specifically, one study focused on seven countries: Hungary, Ireland, Mexico, the Netherlands, the Soviet Union, the United States, and Yugoslavia. Different behaviours were found to elicit different extents of sexual jealousy. For instance, flirting, kissing and sexual involvement elicit sexual jealousy across all these nations. However, dancing, hugging and kissing evoke very different reactions across cultures. In the Soviet Union, the most sexual jealousy is seen across dancing, hugging, flirting and kissing behaviours. Yugoslavian participants display the most intense sexual jealousy to flirting behaviour but the least to kissing. Dutch participants show the least sexual jealousy to kissing, dancing and hugging behaviours.

=== In Western cultures ===
Societies that permit extra-marital sexual relations often discourage sexual jealousy. For example, in Denmark very low sexual jealousy rates are determined by the very low 10% disapproval of extra-marital sex. On the other hand, individuals in the American Midwest show high feelings of sexual jealousy which corresponds to the 90% disapproval of extra-marital sex.

American men also feel more sexual jealousy compared to German men when asked which would cause them more distress: i) a partner having formed a strong emotional attachment with another person or ii) a partner having passionate sexual intercourse with another person. Scenario i) measured emotional jealousy and scenario ii) measured sexual jealousy. The American men reported 33% greater sexual and emotional jealousy compared to German men.

Greater sexual jealousy seen in American men may be because in American culture, love, sex, family relationships and marriage are strongly connected. So when partners entangle with others, loss of love and relationship and therefore sexual jealousy, are all likely to be felt.

Additionally, in Western culture, women are more likely than men to trigger sexual jealousy. Inducing sexual jealousy is to increase their partner's attention towards them and counteract sexual and emotional jealousy.

However, Western culture now is mainly monogamous which is very different from the environments in which the majority of evolution thus far has occurred. Therefore, evolutionarily it is likely that different past cultures also showed differences in sexual jealousy.

=== In Asian or Eastern cultures ===
Cross-cultural comparisons between China and United States reveal that, regardless of nation, men show greater sexual jealousy than women. Females show significantly higher levels of emotional jealousy. In contrast, between the nations, both men and women from the United States show greater sexual jealousy than Chinese individuals.

In contemporary India, sexual jealousy is a primary cause of violence towards women compared to other causes. In an Indian sample, approximately fifty-one per cent of the violence towards women was due to sexual jealousy.

In history, between 1880 and 1925, there was a large number of suicides amongst Indian immigrants on plantations in Fiji that reports attributed to sexual jealousy. Sexual jealousy was high amongst these immigrants due to the disproportionate ratio of sexes: a high number of men to a low number of women. In suicide reports, sexual jealousy was described as a "racial trait" belonging to Indian men and was evoked when European men slept with Indian women during an era of European colonization of India.

== Explanations for cross-cultural differences ==
=== Evolutionary psychology model ===
The differences in feelings of jealousy across cultures support the evolutionary psychological model. Different weights are given to triggers of sexual jealousy depending on the culture. In liberal cultures, male mating effort is based on the number of women the male has copulated with. These men therefore invest less time in each woman and thus exhibit less sexual jealousy.

=== Paternity certainty ===
Paternity certainty is the extent to which a man knows or believes that a woman's child is his.

In polygamous societies, men feel greater sexual jealousy when there is low paternity certainty. This is because they do not want to risk wasting time, energy and resources on a child that is not theirs.

Socio-economic differences between cultures also affect paternity certainty. In a natural fertility country such as Namibia, 96% of males show sexual jealousy.

Additionally, there is greater likelihood of paternity loss and paternity uncertainty when there is a lack of contraceptives. This provides an explanation for why industrialised countries tend to show lower sexual jealousy compared to pre-industrialised countries.

== See also ==
- Compersion
- Mate guarding in humans
