= Eligibility =

Eligibility may refer to:

- The right to run for office (in elections), sometimes called passive suffrage or voting eligibility
- Desirability as a marriage partner, as in the term eligible bachelor
- Validity for participation, as in eligibility to enter a Competition
- Eligibility for the NBA draft
- Eligible receiver, gridiron football rules for catching a pass
- NCAA eligibility, requirements to play college sports in the National Collegiate Athletic Association
- FIFA eligibility rules, requirement to play for a national team in association football
