= Mate guarding in humans =

Behaviours used to retain a mate

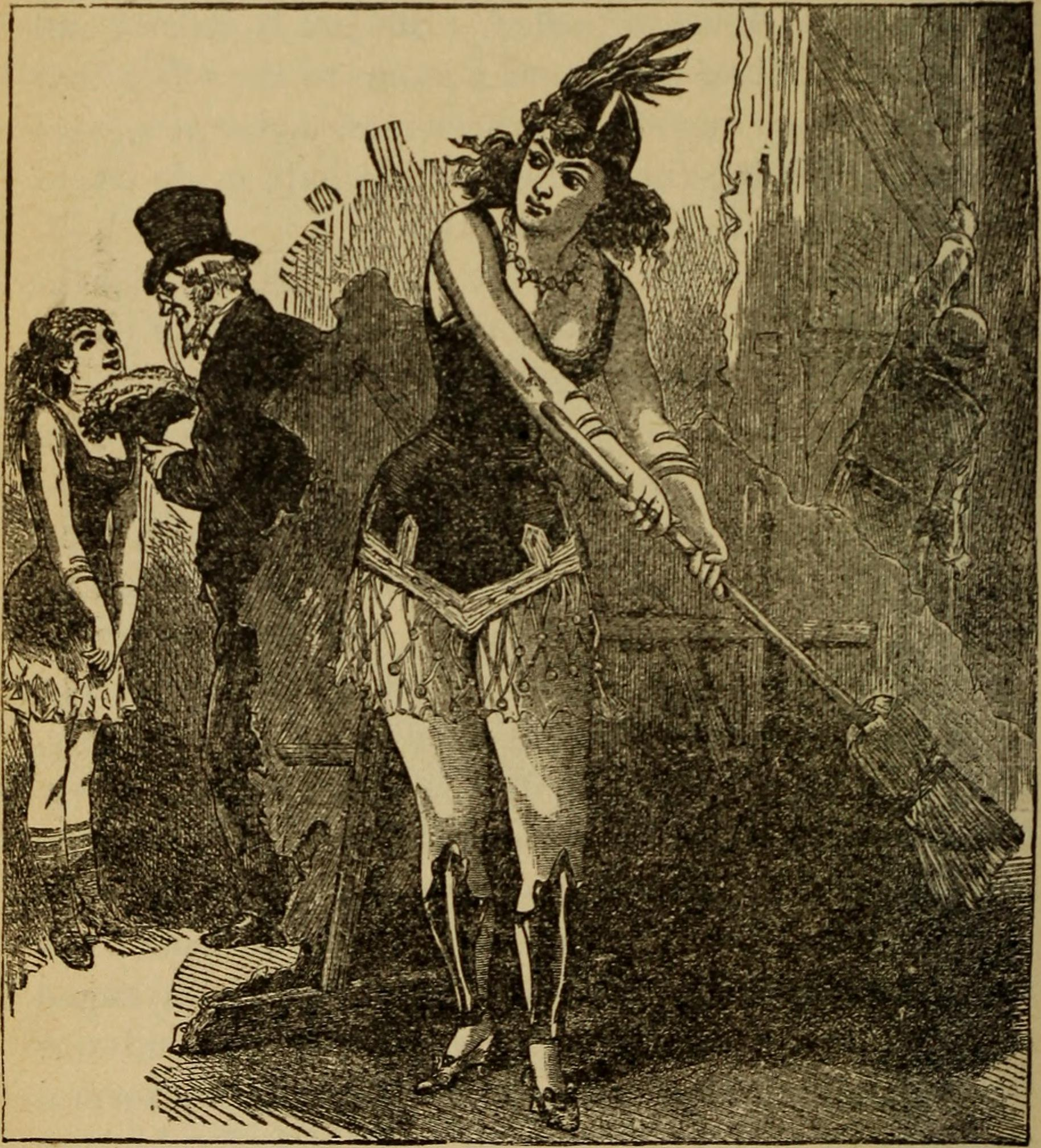
Female mate guarding in humans

Human mate guarding refers to behaviours employed by both males and females with the aim of maintaining reproductive opportunities and sexual access to a mate. It involves discouraging the current mate from abandoning the relationship whilst also warding off intrasexual (same sex) rivals. It has been observed in many non-human animals (see mate guarding and sperm competition), as well as humans. Sexual jealousy is a prime example of mate guarding behaviour. Both males and females use different strategies to retain a mate and there is evidence that suggests resistance to mate guarding also exists.

== Male ==
=== Circumstances of use ===
Male mate guarding is the act of guarding a potential partner from other competing males. Mate guarding behaviour in males is much more likely to be elicited by the threat of sexual infidelity in a female partner, in comparison to emotional involvement outside the mateship. According to a 2004 study across multiple countries, 62% of men have attempted to mate poach for a short-term relationship, as opposed to 40% of women. “In most world regions, women report less frequent poaching attempts for short-term and long-term relationships than men. (Hudek-Knezevic et al., 2022) Schmitt et al. (2004) report that, across countries, an estimated 62% of men and 40% of women have attempted to mate poach for a short-term relationship.” (Fisher M., Wade J., and Moran J., 2023).

For long-term poaching, the difference was smaller, but still existent nonetheless, with 60% of men and 53% of women having attempted to mate poach for a long-term relationship. “The sex difference was smaller for long-term mate poaching, but still present—60% of the men and 53% of the women.” (Schmitt & Buss, 2001). These results are similar to those found in a prior 2001 study among college-aged individuals, where 64% of college-aged men were found to mate poach, as opposed to 49% of college-aged women. Mate poaching attempts among older adults constituted 60% of men and 38% of women. “Schmitt and Buss (2001) found college-aged men (64%) are more likely than college-aged women (49%) to have attempted poaching a short-term mate. These rates are higher than those observed in older adults (60% of men, 38% of women).” (Fisher M., Wade J., and Moran J., 2023).

“The first scientific study of mate poaching (Schmitt & Buss, 2001) found that substantially more men (60%) than women (38%) admitted to having attempted to poach an already mated person for a sexual encounter.” (Tierney J., 2009). Another study sampling participants across ten different countries showed that 57% of men and 35% of women have attempted to mate poach. “Across ten world regions, 57% of men and 35% of women indicated they had engaged in an attempt at mate poaching.” (Hanson R., 2009). This especially raises concern primarily due to the risk female infidelity poses for male paternity, or 'genetic cuckoldry'.

In other words, as fertilisation takes place within females, males do not have paternal certainty in the way that females do (females can always be certain that the offspring is theirs, whilst a male cannot). There is supporting evidence for this cross-culturally in a varied range of countries such as China, Germany, Japan and Sweden. Moreover, in physiological tests such as skin conductance and heart rate, men show greater levels of distress when asked to imagine a partner having sexual intercourse with another person. Mate guarding tactics are more likely to be used if the partner is of high reproductive value e.g. if the female displays signs of high fertility such as youth and physical attractiveness.

=== Risks ===
If a male does not successfully prevent a rival's attempt at mating, there are many risks. If the female becomes fertilised, then the male loses the opportunity to reproduce with that partner for an extended period of time and his genes will not be passed on to the offspring. Moreover, the male may invest years of time, resources and energy into a child that is not genetically his own. If this becomes public knowledge, the individual may also face public humiliation, and as a result this could reduce his social status and affect his future chances to reproduce. There are also 'opportunity costs'; wherein the male could have been spending lost time pursuing alternative mating options.

Male mate guarding behaviour also needs to ensure that the female does not leave the mateship as this would reduce future chances the male may have to reproduce. Moreover, the male would also lose any maternal efforts the female would have invested in any potential offspring. Additionally, access to any social benefits or helping networks that the female brought to the relationship could be lost. Finally, the female could also use information, such as strengths or weakness, about the male to exploit him in the future.

=== Strategies ===
Mate guarding tactics employed by males tend to be hiding the female from intrasexual threats; this could be not bringing the mate to social events in which other competing males may be present. Another is to request that the female wear items that indicate possession, this could be a wedding ring or the male's jacket for example. Males may also demonstrate the quality of resources they have to offer (e.g. buying the mate gifts, or paying for a meal). Men are also more likely to employ threatening and violent behaviour towards intrasexual rivals.

== Female ==
Female mate guarding is the act of guarding a potential partner away from other competing females. It occurs when women mate with males that are seen as desirable due to their paternal value (see mate value), and are therefore more likely to attract other females. Despite women being 44% less likely than men to mate poach, one study showed that over 50% of females asked in a survey admitted to poaching for long-term relationships (see Human mate poaching), as well as 50% of men admitting that they were unfaithful when presented with a poaching female. It is therefore a balancing act between having close female friendships that can help with childcare, and the sharing of resources, but not letting friends become too close that they have easy access to poach successfully. Females have therefore come up with tactics to ward off any potential threats.

=== Avoidance ===
Female mate guarding concentrates on avoiding attractive, fertile females. Research suggests that females are more likely to avoid women that are attractive and exclude them from the group, as these women are interpreted as potential poachers.

Ovulating women are also seen as a threat. Research has shown that women subconsciously change their behaviour across their menstrual cycle, such as dressing more provocatively, which is noticed by men. In one study, men rated photos of ovulating (fertile) women as more attractive, compared to photos of women who were in the luteal (infertile) stage of the menstrual cycle. It is suggested that men are therefore more likely to pursue ovulating women, which become potential threats to their female mates.

Krems, Neel, Neuberg, Puts and Kenrick (2016) also found that women created larger social distance between themselves and a competing female, but only if she was ovulating and attractive. Similarly, this only occurred if the woman was partnered with a desirable mate. This is suggested to be because other females, especially those who are ovulating, are less likely to desire men that have limited resources.

=== Proximity ===
Across the world, it is common for people to sleep in the same bed as one another after copulation. Humans are more likely to engage in sexual activity at night, so therefore night-time brings the highest danger of infidelity. Due to females investing more in the relationship, women receive more benefits from sleeping with their mate during the night. Keeping close proximity with a partner acts as a mate guarding technique as it minimises the likelihood of unfaithfulness by the male, and also assures their partner of her fidelity. As a result of the paternal confidence, the male is also more likely to stay and provide resources. In one study it was found that 73.7% of participants said that females are more likely to want to sleep together after sexual intercourse. Mate guarding is a very likely explanation to this, but it may also have the benefits of increasing the female's protection, potentially from male poachers.

=== Failure to introduce ===
One way to overcome this issue is to avoid introducing threatening friends (potential mates of higher value) to desirable mates. In one study women were shown three pictures of the same female. In one picture the model was dressed conservatively, in the other two she was dressed provocatively, but in the third the model had been photoshopped to have a larger frame. All the women tested rated the thin, provocatively dressed women as the sexiest. Participants were also twice as likely to avoid introducing the model to their partners compared to the conservatively dressed model, who was rated as the least threatening. The authors interpreted these findings as, women who are dressed provocatively are seen as more promiscuous, so therefore are less likely to be introduced to partners due to the possibility of poaching. Not introducing an attractive female to a mate, minimises the likelihood that poaching will occur as it is a form of indirect aggression that minimises contact between a mate and a potential threat.

== Resistance ==
Responses to mate guarding, specifically female resistance to it, have also been observed in both humans and other animals. Responses to mate guarding by males has not been extensively studied. Resistance to mate guarding has been suggested to provide some benefits to partners who do so. In animals, particularly crustaceans, it is argued that resistance allows females to reduce the amount of time the male guards her, giving her more control over mating, as the benefits of mate guarding by males are not worth the costs of trying to overcome resistance from the female. It is therefore suggested that resistance to mate guarding in animals could be a mate choice strategy for female animals. Seeing as mate guarding serves to reduce mate choice, resistance may allow females to ensure they have access to resources from one mate and also look for higher genetic quality extra pair mates to ensure her children are more likely to survive and reproduce themselves. This is known as the female dual mating strategy theory and relates to sexual selection.

=== Tactics ===
Research suggests that female animals exhibit resistance to mate guarding behaviours. There have also been a few studies focusing on mate guarding resistance in female humans. There are numerous tactics that have been recognised as female mate guarding resistance strategies. These include:

- Covert tactics - e.g. hiding items from the partner or flirting/speaking to other men when the initial partner is not present
- Resistance to public displays of affection - e.g. not letting the partner act affectionately towards you in front of others i.e. holding hands or cuddling
- Reactions against rival - e.g. defending rival males when their partner confronted them for expressing an interest in the female
- High tech covert tactics - e.g. changing passwords or deleting online or virtual conversations with rivals over text or email
- Avoiding partners contact - e.g. ignoring calls or texts from the partner
- Resisting control - e.g. fighting about how controlling their partner is or wanting more independence in the relationship

=== Across the menstrual cycle ===
Female resistance to mate guarding has also been researched in the context of the menstrual cycle. Pillsworth, Haselton and Buss (2004) found that women are more likely to want to mate with males they are not currently pair bonded with during the ovulation period of their menstrual cycle. They also show higher mate guarding resistance in general during oestrus. This is supported by the finding that during ovulation women who are both single or in a monogamous partnership with a man are more likely to desire to go to social gatherings where they may meet alternative mates. This is said to support the female dual mating strategy theory, as during oestrus women may be seeking out mates with strong genes.

=== Partner qualities ===
Different qualities of the male partner have also been found to affect the existence of resistance to mate guarding in females. Research has found women with partners who have a low genetic quality, as defined by low sexual attractiveness in comparison to available resources, are more likely to show mate guarding resistant behaviours. This is supported as recent research by Abell and Brewer (2016) suggests that women who believe alternative mates compared to her pair bonded male are of a higher quality are also more likely to resist mate guarding too.

Women married to more possessive, controlling or jealous husbands are more likely to be unfaithful as well. Women who experience this type of behaviour from their partners are more likely to show mate guarding resistance particularly by using covert tactics.

=== Individual differences ===
There is also research into individual differences in female resistance to mate guarding. A recent study by Abell and Brewer (2016) has focused on Machiavellianism. They found that women high in this trait are more likely to resist mate guarding attempts and use covert tactics to do so. They suggest that this reflects the characteristics of machiavellianism – using glibness and manipulation to get what is wanted and it is argued that this is their way of controlling their partners. This is supported by the finding that females who are more controlling themselves will use more mate guarding resistant tactics too.

Women who have a more unrestricted sociosexual orientation index may also be more likely to resist mate guarding too. This type of sociosexuality is defined by more promiscuity and low levels of intimacy in relationships. Related to this, females who report less investment in their current relationship also exhibit more resistance to mate guarding by avoiding contact with their partner. This strategy along with resisting control has also been found to be more widely used for women who report less intimacy in their relationship.

There has been some research looking into attachment style and mate guarding resistance too. It has been found that women who show more avoidant attachment styles are more likely to resist their partners mate guarding attempts. They are most likely to use avoiding public displays of affection, covert tactics and resisting a partners control as resistance strategies. Those who express anxious attachment styles are more likely to resist mate guarding via covert methods.

== See also ==
- Human mating strategies
- Sperm competition
- Sexual jealousy
- Sexual selection
