= Resource acquisition ability =

Social psychology concept

Resource acquisition ability (RAA) is a term in social psychology and the sexual opposite of the reproductive value (RV), introducing an unintentional mechanism used by women when selecting a male partner. The RAA is focused on some factors:

- Genetic information
- Wealth
- Salary
- Social status
- Child care
- Personal history (i.e. crime affairs are not good for the RAA)
- Numerous other things

Unlike the reproduction value, the RAA is not a scale. Mainly because of the unindexable factors, this term is a bit more complex than the RV.

== See also ==
- Hypergamy
- Interpersonal attraction
