= Sexual economics =

Controversial hypothesis in evolutionary psychology

Sexual economics is a highly controversial field found within evolutionary psychology. The theory purports to relate to how male and female participants think, feel, behave and give feedback during sex-related or mating-related events. This theory states that the thinking, preferences and behavior of men and women follow the fundamental economic principles. It was proposed by psychologists Roy Baumeister and Kathleen Vohs.

Sexual economics theory enjoyed support from some in the fields of social psychology and evolutionary psychology, but some aspects of it have also been criticized by others for their reliance on outdated western stereotypes of gender that do not replicate cross-culturally.

== Definition and theory ==
Baumeister's proposal defines sex as a marketplace deal according to the highly controversial maxim (sometimes associated with a paraphrase of Donald Symons) that sexuality is "something that women have and men want". Baumeister claims that sex is a resource that women hold overall. According to this claim, women hold on to their bodies until they receive enough motivation to give them up, such as love, commitment, time, attention, caring, loyalty, respect, happiness and money from another party. On the other side, men are the ones who offer the resources that entice women into sex.

Sexual economics is based on social exchange theory: it alleges that people are willing to give up something if they can get in exchange what they believe will benefit them more. The theory rests on the belief that typically one party is more eager to exchange resources for what the other party holds, thus causing a bargaining power imbalance. At this point, the party who is less willing to exchange what they have has a higher control in this relationship. In the example of a sexual relationship, if one side wants to have sexual intercourse less than the other, he or she can hold out until a more attractive offer is made. In the classic formulation of this theory based on western gender and sexual stereotypes, women are constructed as having a lower libido than men, and therefore are the ones who "hold out" and extract resources from men as a form of manipulation. This apparent modern and western trend is retroprojected onto previous times and non-western societies by many evolutionary psychologists, despite little to no evidence justifying such retroprojection and a great deal of evidence against it.

In the view of Mark Regnerus, the economic perspective is clear. The behavior he analyzed in the market place states that the majority rule is a political principle that often works in human society, but sex is an exception and minority rules work are applicable.

== Difference of female and male sexual value ==
This theory rests on the controversial belief that sexual activity is "naturally" more desirable for males than females in human societies. In some primates, male aggression against females has the effect of controlling female sexuality for the male's reproductive advantage. Furthermore, the evolutionary perspective provides a hypothesis to help explain cross-culture variation in the frequency of male aggression against women. Variables include the protection of women by family or community, male alliances, and male strategies for protecting spouses and achieving adulterous mating and male resource control.

According to sexual economics theory, males and females are different both physically and physiologically. According to the model, men give women resources, and then women will allow sex to take place. Under the context of sex, the trade of sex and resources keeps happening (Baumeister alleges that female control of sexuality and male competition for mates are consistent traits through eras and cultures, in sharp contrast to the available ethnographic evidence), and society has acknowledged that female sexuality has more value than male sexuality. For instance, men and women in the west have different feelings about their virginity. Women are more likely to think of their virginity as a precious gift and cherish it, while men see their virginity as a shameful condition and want to get rid of it early in life. This is a culturally bound response, as in some societies virginity has little to no value and anxieties surrounding female sexuality do not apply. The sexual economics theory, however, generally fails to deal with ethnographic data which dispute its core premises, instead assuming itself to be correct based on self-report data from western societies and projecting this modern data onto previous societies and other time periods.

It is also claimed that prostitution (the exchange of sex for money or equivalent items) may be a threat to women's status because sex is mostly considered as part of an intimate relationship instead of a contract.

=== Virginity auction ===
A virginity auction is a controversial auction often published online. The person who tries to sell his/her virginity is often a young female, and the winning bidder will have the opportunity to be the first who have intercourse with the person. It is a controversial topic for multiple reasons, including questions over the ethics of leveraging virginity as a "prize" in a patriarchal society, as well as issues of authenticity. The person who auctions their virginity mostly do so for quick financial help. Sexual economics theorists attempt to use virginity auctions to prove that women use sex as a resource to trade financial help from men. While this would seem to indicate that such processes do occur in western culture, once again this theory faces severe criticism from anthropologists and sociologists who point to non-western counterexamples where virginity is not valued, or where men are expected to render sexual services to women in exchange for favors (such as the Kabyle Amazigh of North Africa).

=== Sugar baby ===
Sugar baby is another controversial case that exists in modern American society. A sugar baby and sugar daddy/mommy are in a beneficial relationship, which means sugar babies provide time and sexual services to please their partners, and sugar daddies/mommas give financial support back to sugar babies including helping them in student loans and also provide luxury lifestyles such as expensive items they couldn't afford on their own. According to the registered number on dating websites, sugar babies are mostly female and the number of sugar daddies is distinctly more than the number of sugar mommies. Supporters of sexual economics theory point to this discrepancy as evidence for the central theory that men "need" or desire sexual gratification more than women do, while critics note that in patriarchal societies where most wealth and access to resources are held by men, such transactional relationships are likely to develop.

== Societal outcomes ==
=== Domestic violence ===
Some examples have been given by proponents of sexual economics theory which they allege support their claims. In a violent relationship, women are often more likely to be victimized. In one study, the results showed that jealousy is the most frequently used explanation for domestic violence for women, but for men two emotions lead to violence. The first one involves destructive thoughts (also refers to "critical inner voice") dominant like "She's trying to fool you" or "You are not man enough if you don't control her in mind and body." The other element contains a detrimental illusion (also refers to "fantasy bond"), it brings a sense that another person constituted a whole within the subject, and is essential for their happiness.

Several advances in promoting equality between sexes have been made (such as abortion law modification in some areas), but most agrarian or industrialized societies are still patriarchal societies. Men are thought of as stronger than women, especially physically. The expectation of being masculine and more powerful than women could be destructive for men by leading to violence. Therefore, proponents of this theory claim that a woman who has a violent partner might choose to offer sex to comfort and mostly distract them from abusing her. In this case, trading sex is considered as one useful way for women to escape emotional and physical abuse from men in a violent relationship.

=== Adultery ===
The punishment for adultery is different between different genders in some countries. In some cultures, adultery is considered a crime, and although punishments for adultery such as stoning are also applied to men, the vast majority of the victims are women. In some cultures, the wives' adultery can be a viable reason if the husband wants to divorce, however, husbands' adultery cannot justify divorce. This is held up as evidence for sex being considered a female resource, although the copious number of cultures which lack clear evidence of a sexual "double standard" are generally either ignored or proclaimed (typically without supporting evidence) as actually containing said "double standard". David Barash, for instance, attempted to respond to Christopher Ryan's claims about sexual egalitarianism in hunter-gatherer societies by stating that the sexual double standard is a human universal, yet offered no documentation for this claim and did not engage with the past century of primary ethnographic sources which dispute it.

Proponents of the sexual economic theory highlight countries such as the Philippines, where the law differentiates based on gender: a woman can be charged as a criminal of adultery if she has had sexual intercourse with someone other than her husband, but a man can only be charged with crimes such as concubinage, either keeping his mistress at home, or co-habitating with her, or having sexual relationships under scandalous circumstances. The existence of many alternative patterns in pre-state societies is generally not mentioned by proponents of the sexual economic theory.

=== Pornography ===
In some countries, there is a significant difference between men and women in the consumption of pornography. Some researchers have attempted to provide evidence for sexual differences in libido by pointing out that men are more likely to view pornography compared to women, and there are more male users on pornography websites than female users. Pornhub, as one of the biggest pornography websites in the world, reported of the year at the end of 2019 that there were 32% female users in 2019, while 68% of Pornhub users were male, which means the number of male users was two times more than female users worldwide. While at first blush this finding seems to promote the universality of sexual economics, those using the pornography argument for higher male libido as compared to women typically neglect to mention that there is significant variation between countries, with some nations having significantly more female than male Pornhub users, as well as the fact that even in western nations, the gap is closing rapidly. They also struggle to account for the huge female overrepresentation in non-visual forms of erotica, such as erotic novels.

=== Human trafficking ===
Human trafficking is a global issue and has consistently existed for centuries, nevertheless, it entered public consciousness around the beginning of the twenty-first century. Human trafficking is the process of enslaving people and exploiting them. Sex trafficking is one of the most common types of human trafficking. According to the data derived by The United Nations Office for Drugs and Crime in 2016, 51% identified victims of human trafficking were women, children made up 28% and 21% were men. 72% of those who were exploited in the sex industry were women, while 63% of identified traffickers were men. Most victims are placed in abusive and coercive situations, but escaping is also difficult and life-threatening for them.

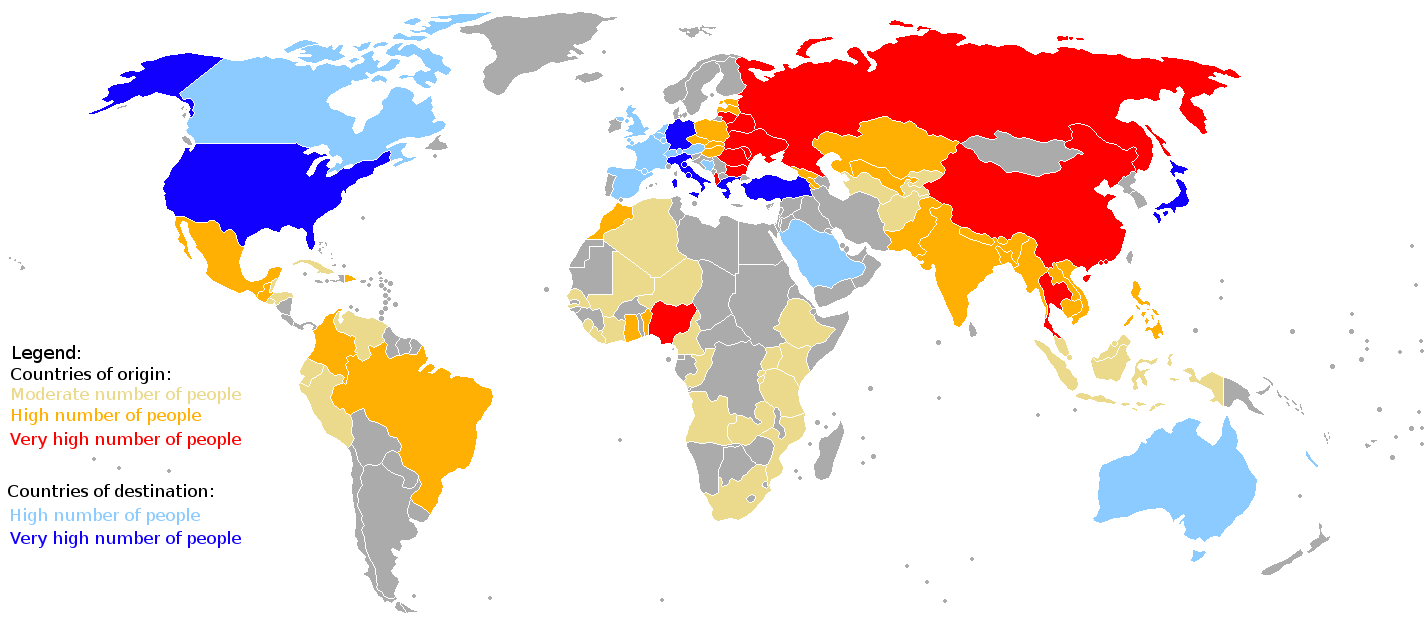
global human trafficking from countries of origin and destination Countries of origin Yellow: Moderate number of persons Orange: High number of persons Red: Very high number of persons Countries of destination Light blue: High number of persons Blue: Very high number of persons

According to The International Labor Organization, 4.5 million people are affected by sex trafficking in the world. Sex trafficking victims are often caught by various prosecuted criminal activities such as illegal prostitution. Besides the law, problems like long-lasting problems such as disease (AIDS), malnutrition, psychological trauma, addiction to drugs, and social ostracism against this group of people should be addressed as well.

=== Sex bribery in the work place ===
Sex bribery is defined as a "form of quid pro quo harassment in a sexual relationship with the declared or implicit condition for acquiring/retaining employment or its benefit" in an employment setting. A common example of sex bribery might come down to sexual activity or sexually related behavior accompanied by a reward such as a promotion opportunity or raise in payment. In a workplace, attempted coercion of sexual activity may under the threat of two major types of punishment: negative work performance feedback/evaluation and withheld chances of promotions and raises.

According to the 2016 Personal Safety Survey, around 55% of women over 18 have experienced sexual harassment in their lifetime, including receiving indecent phone calls, texts, emails; indecent exposure; inappropriate comments about the person's body and sex life; having unwanted touching, grabbing and kissing; and exposing and distributing the person's text, pictures, and sexual videos, without the person's permission. It is a serious, widespread problem, and the person who has a sexual harassment experience can feel stressed, anxious and depressed, sometimes withdrawing socially, becoming less productive, and losing confidence and self-esteem.

The modern phenomenon of higher female as opposed to male victimization from sexual harassment is sometimes used as a justification for essentialist views of sex differences in sexuality (such as by Donald Symons who argued in his 1979 book The Evolution of Human Sexuality that "only men rape", a claim which is now universally condemned), but most social scientists (especially those writing from a third- or fourth-wave feminist framework) dispute this, pointing to institutionalized patriarchy as a more reasonable culprit than "male nature".

== Criticism: anthropology, sociology, and philosophy ==
The sexual economics theory has been highly controversial from the start, due to its basis in a biologically deterministic worldview and its overreliance on Roy Baumeister's theoretical framework as well as highly questionable self-report survey data. Sexual economics presupposes a highly reductionist understanding of both sexuality and economics, and (like many theories in evolutionary psychology) a retroprojection of highly culturally-bound western phenomena as some sort of "universal human norm". The basic framework that later developed into the sexual economics theory originated with neo-Darwinian anthropologists such as Donald Symons, whose claims about human sexuality and especially female sexuality are extremely controversial and widely criticized.

While writers like Donald Symons and David Buss have attempted to universalize their findings, and even purported to find cross-cultural support for theories such as "sex is something that women have and men want", their research suffers from a multitude of both philosophical and empirical weaknesses. For instance, their samples neglect to include matrilineal or matrilocal societies, where sex differences in behavior are typically either minimized or reversed. Generally speaking, most samples which indicate the finding that men are more sexually motivated than women are from societies which are historically highly patriarchal, and hold (or held until recently) a highly negative attitude towards premarital sex, especially in women. Such societies tend to be large, populous states as opposed to smaller-scale foraging and horticultural societies, which are usually more liberal towards sexuality. These studies almost always rely on quantitative self-report surveys, which are plagued with problems such as social desirability bias (maximized for women in cultures which have traditionally valued virginity), sampling issues and (in non-western cultures specifically) resistance or hostility to reveal personal information to outsiders. Cultural anthropologists working with Boasian methodology with an emphasis on participant observation and non-judgmental, emic evaluation of other societies have long warned of the dangers of reliance on quantitative methodology such as surveys (or any research method using a primarily etic perspective) for adequately capturing the internal beliefs and behaviors of other cultures.

There is a sharp contrast between the assumed "universality" of male and female differences in sexual motivation reported by Buss, Symons, Baumeister and others utilizing self-report survey data, and the findings of traditional cultural anthropologists collecting data through classic methods of ethnographic fieldwork. One major issue with the core claim of sexual economics theory is that it is philosophically and epistemically a western concept to its core, to the extent that most non-western societies have typically viewed male and female sexual drives as either the same or else characterized by higher female than male libido Historical studies have outlined a specific time and philosophical background when the modern western conception of "horny" male and coy female became dominant, pointing out that prior to the 18th century these ideas were not even widely believed in the west. Since there were no neuroscientific breakthroughs which occurred between 1700 and 1800, the change in opinion (and the source of the modern western belief that men have a higher sex drive than women) was ideological, not scientific in nature, related to the construction of a bourgeois morality which relegated women to a role as moral guardians who remained at home while men went out and "sowed their wild oats" (the so-called cult of domesticity). Today, westerners continue to follow this paradigm and assume its validity a priori, despite lack of neuroscientific documentation indicating that men are biologically more hard-wired toward seeking sexual pleasure and a host of competing theories for this apparent "sex difference".

The belief that men are more promiscuous on average than women is common in the general culture and has even been taken up by some sociologists, despite the obvious mathematical problems: given a relatively similar number of males and females in a given human population, the amount of heterosexual sex promiscuity should average out to be more or less the same for both sexes. Self-report data typically finds that men report significantly larger numbers of lifetime sexual partners on average than women, which is a mathematical impossibility due to the near-equal distributions of the sexes in the population. Therefore, it is highly likely that biased and dishonest reporting is occurring, with more men inflating their number of sex partners and more women underreporting theirs. Studies using bogus pipelines to adjust for social desirability bias have found that women are just as likely as men to have sex with multiple partners and even to masturbate. Even if one were to steelman the sexual economics theorists by pointing out that sexual behavior may not reflect men's inborn higher sexual motivation, one would still be forced to deal with cross-cultural evidence from non-patriarchal and non-restrictive societies like the Mosuo or the Trobriand Islanders whose "sexual economies" are fundamentally different from the model presupposed by this theory.

== See also ==
- Hypergamy
- Sexual capital
- Mate value
- Mate choice in humans
- Social exchange theory
