= Hypergamy =

Practice of a person marrying a spouse of higher social status

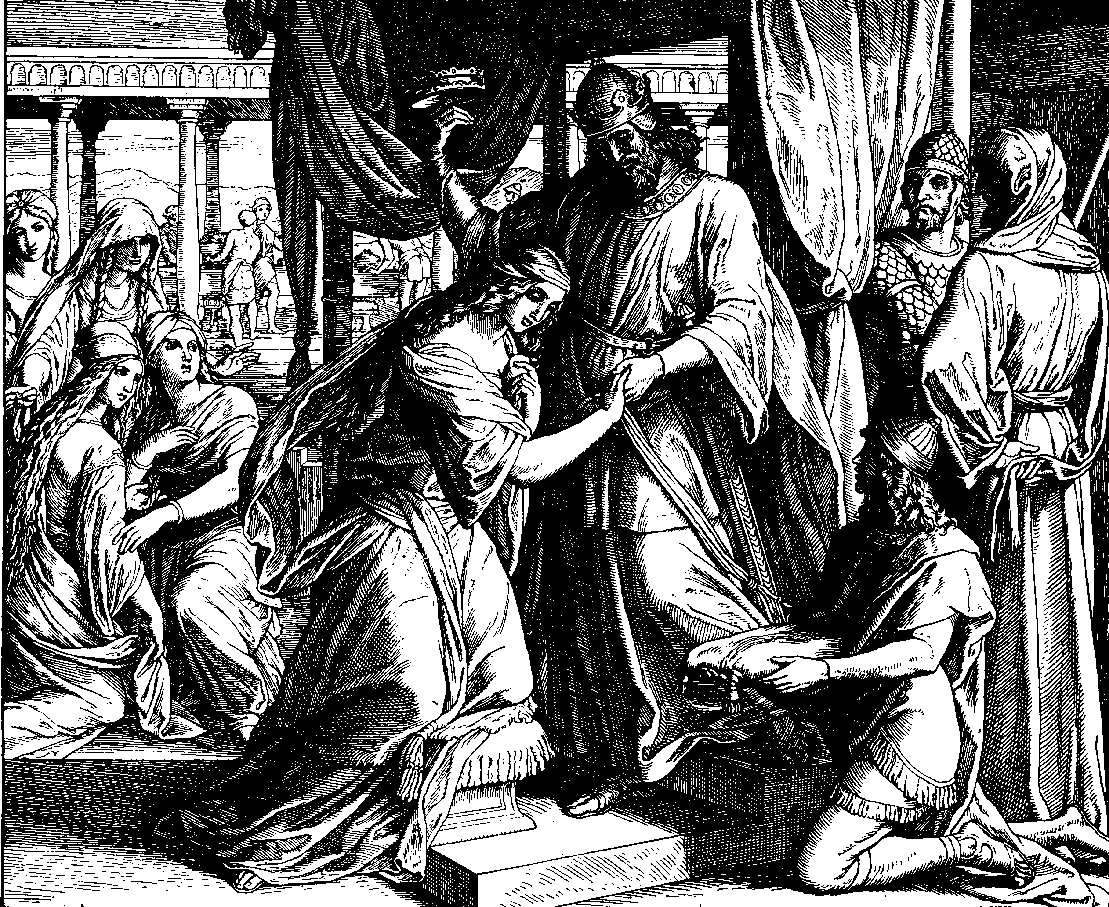
Esther is crowned in this 1860 woodcut by Julius Schnorr von Karolsfeld.

Hypergamy

In social science, hypergamy (colloquially referred to as marrying up or dating up) originally referred to marrying or dating someone of higher socioeconomic class; today more commonly (especially colloquially and in evolutionary psychology) however, it refers to partnering with someone of higher general/composite mate value.

The antonym hypogamy refers to the inverse, a preference for dating or marrying someone of lower mate value or socioeconomic class. The term hypergyny can also be used to describe the practice of women marrying up. Concepts such as hypergamy, hypogamy, and hypergyny could be considered special cases of mésalliance.

== History ==
References to Hindu law books from the Indian subcontinent in the 19th century include the Sanskrit terms anuloma and pratiloma, respectively, for the concepts of hypergamy and hypogamy.

The early Christian Church, through voices such as St. Basil the Great, sought to limit the effects of hypergamous customs, notably the large age gap that may have resulted from hypergamous mate selection. This guideline was not a part of church canon but some orthodox or Coptic churches recommend respective gaps of around 4–8 years or 1–15 years, with narrower age gaps recommended for younger couples.

In some incel and manosphere circles, hypergamy has been invoked to explain the belief that women disproportionately prefer wealthy or conventionally attractive men. Before the 2014 Isla Vista attacks, the perpetrator Elliot Rodger posted a diagram depicting women abandoning most men in favor of a small number of desirable men; its final panel portrayed the rejected men as dead following a violent "revolution". David Futrelle writing in the feminist site We Hunted the Mammoth described the diagram as Rodger’s adaptation of a manosphere meme about supposed female hypergamy. Rodger expressed a similar belief in his manifesto, writing that attractive women selected "brutal" men rather than men whom he considered more deserving, and he attributed women’s rejection of him to their freedom to choose sexual partners.

== Definitional distinction ==
=== Classical: simple and demographic variable-based ===
In classical anthropology and sociology, hypergamy was historically (and sometimes still is) defined as a macro-level structural practice in which an individual (typically a woman) marries a spouse of higher social caste, socioeconomic class, or educational attainment. Demographic research indicates that as female educational attainment and workforce participation surpassed men's in many developed nations during the late 20th and early 21st centuries, structural educational hypergamy declined significantly. Consequently, macro-level mating patterns shifted toward assortative mating (educational homogamy), where individuals predominantly partner with spouses of similar educational and socioeconomic backgrounds.

=== Modern: multi-dimensional and evolutionary psychology-based ===
Modern social science (particularly evolutionary psychology, sexual economics and social exchange theory), and also modern informal discourse, broaden the concept of hypergamy beyond classical socioeconomic metrics to encompass multi-dimensional mate value trade-offs and compensatory exchange models. Under economic and social exchange models of marriage (such as those developed by Gary Becker), couples who appear homogamous in formal education or income level may still exhibit hypergamous dynamics through compensatory off-setting exchanges, such as:

- Compensatory financial transfers: Any kind of net financial expenditure, provisioning, or lifestyle support by a higher-earning or higher-resourced partner can create functional hypergamy within unions that are nominally equal in educational background. These expenditures most commonly consists of women trading romantic or sexual interest for financial security, social standing and financial transfers from men.
- Immigration benefits: In international marriage markets and cross-border unions, romantic or sexual interest (particularly from physically attractive people) is often exchanged for legal permanent residency, or citizenship rights (e.g., a "green card" or visa status) where women are more common than men to be on the receiving end of such legal rights.

Sociologists note that while formal demographic hypergamy has decreased at the population level in favour of homogamy, multi-dimensional hypergamy and resulting trade-offs continue to operate within mate selection markets.

In addition, non-formal hypergamic factors such as physical attractiveness are now also discussed and considered a part of hypergamic selectivity.

== Common hypergamic factors ==
=== Physical attractiveness ===
In the context of evolutionary psychology and digital sociology, hypergamy by physical attractiveness refers to the tendency of individuals to seek partners who are perceived as more physically attractive than themselves. With the advent of big data from online dating platforms, researchers have begun to quantify these patterns, observing distinct disparities in how men and women evaluate and pursue attractiveness.

Quantitative data from various dating platforms suggests a significant skew in how attractiveness is appraised. Data released by OkCupid indicated that while men tended to rate women on a traditional normal distribution (bell curve) of attractiveness, women rated approximately 80% of men as "below average" in physical appeal.

Research into the intersection of race and physical attractiveness in online dating often highlights the persistence of specific demographic preferences. Studies published in journals such as Psychological Science and various sociological reviews have noted that in Western heterosexual dating markets, white men often receive a disproportionate amount of interest and higher attractiveness scores compared to other ethnic groups. Specifically, data-driven analyses suggest that most attractive white men often occupy the "top tier" of the digital dating hierarchy, receiving the highest volume of positive signals from a broad spectrum of female users, which researchers interpret as a convergence of hypergamy and existing social hierarchies. Sociologists argue that these preferences are influenced by "sexual racism" or "racialized erotic capital", where Eurocentric beauty standards elevate the perceived desirability of certain groups.

=== Income expenditure and financial provisioning ===
In evolutionary psychology and relationship sociology, researchers distinguish between a potential partner's income capacity and their actual financial expenditure or resource transfer within a relationship. While income measures resource potential, empirical studies indicate that willingness to invest resources—demonstrated through direct courtship spending, gift-giving, and ongoing financial provisioning—serves as an independent factor in hypergamic selectivity.

Sociological and economic analyses of household resource allocation indicate that net expenditure patterns in heterosexual relationships frequently display gendered asymmetries. Under social exchange theory and intra-household financial models, men disproportionately absorb courtship costs, shared recreational expenses, and living expenses, even in relationships where both partners earn comparable nominal incomes. As a result, researchers observe that hypergamic trade-offs extend beyond earnings brackets to include net expenditure hypergamy, wherein one partner acts as the primary financial contributor to joint consumption regardless of income parity.

=== Level of income ===
In a 2016 paper that explored the income difference between couples in 1980 and 2012, researcher Yue Qian noted that the tendency for women to marry men with higher incomes than themselves persists in the modern era.

The observed gender cliff in the distribution of women's share of household income at 50% can be explained by income hypergamy preferences by both men and women, together with the gender pay gap.

=== Level of education ===
A study found traditional marriage practices in which men "marry down" and women "marry up" in education do not persist in countries where women have higher educational attainment.

== Evolutionary explanation of female hypergamy ==
From an evolutionary perspective (specifically, parental investment theory), the difference in the percentage of males that females find physically attractive enough to have as mates allows females, as a group, to be the more selective sex. This, in turn, allows them to choose partners based on those partners’ ability and willingness to allocate resources toward them and any potential offspring. Especially in early courtship, financial spending functions as a costly signal, differentiating individuals who hold wealth from those willing to convert wealth into relational commitment and resource sharing.

In 2008, economist Gilles Saint-Paul proposed a mathematical model that purports to demonstrate that human female hypergamy occurs because women have greater lost mating opportunity costs from monogamous mating (given their slower reproductive rate and limited window of fertility compared to men), and thus must be compensated for this cost of marriage. At the end of his introduction, Saint-Paul states his model is consistent with statistics published by Bertrand et al. (2013) but also notes that in US Bureau of Labor Statistics (BLS) data gathered the same year "aggregate evidence is not so clear-cut."

== General differences by sex ==
Studies of mate selection in dozens of countries around the world have found men and women report prioritizing different traits when it comes to choosing a mate, with both groups favouring attractive partners in general, but that men tend to prefer women who are younger while women tend to prefer richer men, in higher socioeconomic standing or physically attractive. They argue that as societies shift towards becoming more gender-equal, women's mate selection preferences shift as well. Some research provides support for that theory, while other research contradicts it.

== Quantitative measurement ==
=== General mate value hypergamy ===
One study found that women are more selective in their choice of marriage partners than are men.

=== Demographic (level of income and level of education) hypergamy ===
In Britain, marrying up has decreased significantly since the 1950s. It is becoming less common for women to marry older men, because current socioeconomic dynamics allow women more autonomy. Hypergamy does not necessitate the man being older; rather, it requires him to have higher socioeconomic standing.

A 2012 analysis of a survey of 8,953 people in 37 countries, which found that the more gender-equal a country, the likelier male and female respondents were to report seeking the same qualities in each other rather than different ones.

One study did not find a statistical difference in the number of women or men "marrying-up" in a sample of 1,109 first-time married couples in the United States.

=== Physical attractiveness hypergamy ===
Observational data from mobile dating applications demonstrate distinct gender asymmetries in mate selectivity when users evaluate photo-based profiles. In an empirical study analyzing user activity on Tinder, Tyson et al. (2016) found that men and women employ contrasting strategies during initial visual screening. Female users exhibit strong selectivity, liking only a small fraction of male profiles, which results in a relatively high match rate of approximately 10%. In contrast, male users adopt a non-selective strategy by swiping right broadly across profiles, yielding a match rate of roughly 0.6%. Consequently, on photo-based platforms, female selectivity functions as a strict initial gatekeeping mechanism, whereas male swiping strategy relies on broader preference.

== Feminist analysis ==
Feminist analysis of hypergamy says the practice needs to be understood in the context of a system: men choose attractive and young partners due to fertility and reproductive success, and women choose partners with material resources simply because they make life more comfortable. Feminist historians say lower-status families participate in hypergamy because it is felt that the best possible use of a daughter is for her to increase the status of her natal family by marrying up. Hypergamy allows higher-status men maximum choice in mate selection, and, as historically practiced in India, results in the man's family gaining wealth through the transfer of dowry from the bride's family. Overall, hypergamy has the potential to advantage lower-status women economically and socially the most, since they marry into a higher status and the dowry becomes part of their marital wealth. This occurs at the cost of less-desirable, higher-status women (since higher-status men are removed from their mating pool, and lower-status men are already excluded by social constraints and economic disincentives). Lower-status men are disadvantaged the most (since lower-status women are removed from their mating pool, and higher-status women are already excluded by social constraints and economic incentive structures). The overall effect is that all women have a chance to marry into a high(er)-status, whereas lower-status men do not. Thus, feminist analysis concludes that hypergamy can be explained without requiring evolution to explain it.

Because a hypergamous marriage is unequal, hypergamy has been criticized for reinforcing and perpetuating gender inequality in society overall, for example when highly educated women married to high-income men decide to stay home to raise children rather than pursue their own careers.

== Usage in the manosphere ==
According to academics Matthew L. Meier and Kellen Sharp, the incel subculture within the manosphere utilise the concept of hypergamy to justify their misogynistic worldview that women are "evolutionarily programmed" to "marry up", and that incels additionally compile material that they call "evidence-based misogyny" to attempt to justify their misogynistic interpretation of hypergamy.

== See also ==
- Ageism
- Age disparity in sexual relationships
- Blackpill
- Breadwinner model
- Dating
- Dating preferences
- Eligible bachelor
- Erotic capital
- Evolutionary psychology
- Exogamy
- Men's rights movement
- Gold digging
- Height discrimination
- Homogamy (sociology)
- Mating system
- Physical attractiveness
- Polygamy
- Polygyny threshold model
- Prostitution
- Resource acquisition ability
- Sexual capital
- Sexual economics
- Sexual selection
- Social psychology
- Social status
- Socioeconomics
- Trophy wife
- Utilitarianism

== Sources ==
- Eckland, Bruce K. (1971). "Theories of Mate Selection". In Adams, Bert N.; Weirath, Thomas (eds.). Readings on the Sociology of the Family. Chicago: Markham. ISBN 0-8410-4025-7.
