= Eligible bachelor =

Bachelor considered to be a desirable husband

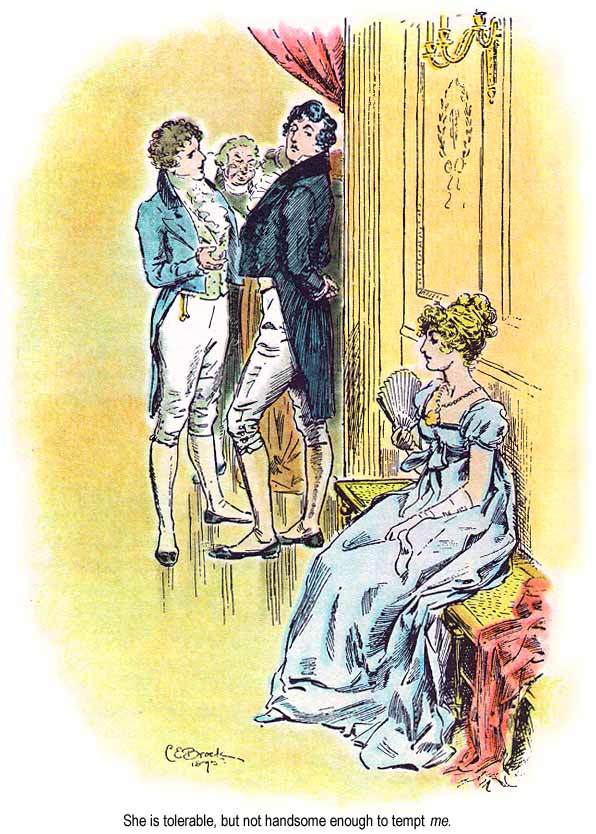
Jane Austen's novels often contain an eligible bachelor, such as Fitzwilliam Darcy.

An eligible bachelor is a bachelor considered to be a particularly desirable potential husband, usually due to his wealth, high social status, or other specific personal qualities such as physical attractiveness and sex appeal.

In the United Kingdom, the heir to the throne or someone close in succession is often considered to be the nation's, or the world's most eligible bachelor, due to their social status, as has happened with former bachelors King Charles and his son, Prince William.

Jane Austen's novels are often concerned with the heroine's relationship with an eligible bachelor. Jane Austen's Emma particularly concerns a woman's attempt to obtain a husband for her friend by embellishing the truth. The gentleman in that case sees it as an example of the matchmaker's creativity and falls in love with her.

== Homosexuals as apparent eligible bachelors ==
During the 1950s and 1960s, Rock Hudson was hailed as an eligible bachelor. In the past, if a man chose to remain an eligible bachelor for long, he may have been suspected of being homosexual. The euphemism "confirmed bachelor" has fallen from common usage, as past life patterns involving marriage, divorce, and prolonged bachelorhood have been altered for men since the advent of the sexual revolution.

== Sociology ==
Robin Lakoff argues that the term indicates an inequality between men and women, as an "eligible bachelor" chooses to be a bachelor, whereas an "eligible spinster" does not have a choice. Lakoff believes this use of language fosters, and grows from, sexual discrimination. Lakoff states "women are given their identity in our society by virtue of their relationship with men, and not vice versa."

== See also ==
- Courtship
- Hypergamy
- Social status
- Romance novel
- Essentialism
- Bateman's principle
