= Mate guarding =

Reproductive behavior in animals

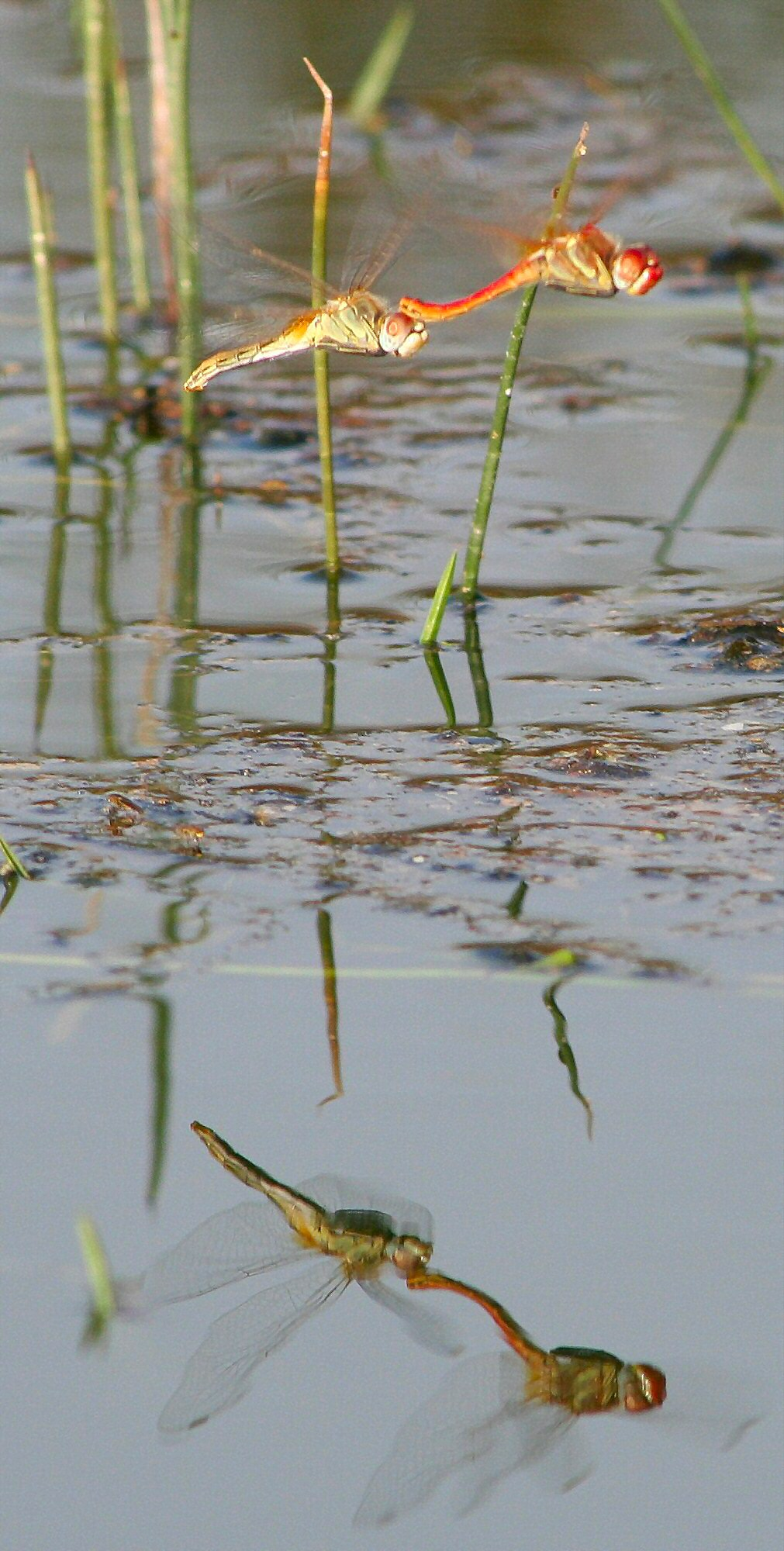
A male red-veined darter (Sympetrum fonscolombii) clasping a female behind the neck after copulation to prevent other males from mating and to increase the chances of successful paternity

Mate guarding is a competitive reproductive behaviour, primarily exhibited by males, to monopolize a mate and ensure exclusive paternity by guarding, dissuading, or physically blocking rivals from copulating with the female. Mate guarding behaviour can be pre- or post-copulatory.

Mate guarding has similar aims and may overlap with but is distinct from territoriality where mating exclusivity is achieved by expelling rivals from an area and monopolizing resources, and sperm competition.

== Fitness ==
While increasing the probability of paternity by reducing possibilities for secondary matings and sperm competition, mate guarding has fitness costs; guards spend energy, they can be injured in fights with rivals, they lose opportunities to feed, and lose additional mating opportunities.

Depending on the mechanism employed, a female being guarded may lose opportunities to seek additional mating which would increase her fitness by diversifying paternity, be injured in rival male fights, and have her movement inhibited, but benefit from being defended from predation, receiving male assistance, and protection from injurious harassment by competing males.

== Mate guarding strategies ==
- Physical guarding through displays or force - In many species of birds, males closely accompany fertile females during breeding seasons.
- Frequent copulation
- Prolonged copulation - Male dragonflies often stay attached to females after copulation.
- Chemical deterrence and mate behavior modulation - The noctuid moth Heliothis virescens practices chemical mate guarding. Male H. virescens, who prefer virgin females, mark females they mate with chemical compounds after copulation that render them less attractive to males. The pheromone separately functions as an anti-aphrodisiac to discourage female mating for up to two days.
- Mating plugs - a physical obstruction is placed in the female's reproductive tract after mating to block rival sperm fertilization.

== See also ==
- Territoriality - a sexual strategy to preserve exclusivity of mating opportunities through control of land and resources
- Mate guarding in humans
