= Mate value =

Sum of desirable traits in a potential mate

Mate value is derived from Charles Darwin's theory of evolution and sexual selection, as well as the social exchange theory of relationships. Mate value is defined as the sum of traits that are perceived as desirable, representing genetic quality and/or fitness, an indication of a potential mate's reproductive success. Based on mate desirability and mate preference, mate value underpins mate selection and the formation of romantic relationships.

Mate value can predict availability of mates, for example, a higher mate value means one is desirable to more individuals and so can afford to be more choosy in mate selection. Thus, one's own mate value can influence trait and mate preferences, it has been shown that an individual will show preference for another who has a similar mate value, to avoid rejection. Specifically, one could infer that one's own mate value has a direct impact upon partner choice through the biological market theory. Here, it is believed that 'high-market' (more attractive individuals), are able to translate mate preference into actual choice, primarily due to the fact they have more to offer, such as positive health markers, consequently affecting reproductive success Ultimately, mate value has been suggested as a 'determining factor in mate choice', consequently influencing the reproductive success of an individual.

Factors such as attractiveness can influence perceived mate value. It has been suggested that preferences dictate an individual's mate value, leading to the prioritising of certain characteristics by some and not others. This results in potential mates having different (subjective) mate values dependent on the mate-seekers's preferences.

Further influences of mate value may include cultural effects, sex differences and evolutionary impacts.

== Evolution ==
Evolutionary theory has provided evidence suggesting that individuals aim for the highest mate value possible, in both others and themselves. Mate values that have continuously been seen as preferential include fertility, reproductive ability, health, age, intelligence, socioeconomic status, the ability to provide resources, parenting skills, kindness, and willingness and ability to invest in offspring. However, all individuals are different and therefore value characteristics in different ways leading to a time-consuming search, especially if looking for a mate based on one's own mate value. These individual differences of mate value have great evolutionary importance for survival, mating and reproductive success. Despite this, Buss et al. (2001) show how various mate values have increased and decreased in preference over time. With the expanded availability of reliable birth control and contraception, chastity has become a less favoured mate value whereas dependable character, emotion stability and maturity have stayed highly desired.

In the book The Adapted Mind: Evolutionary Psychology and the Generation of Culture (1995), Ellis conveys which features women link to high mate value. These characteristics include; economic status, willingness to invest in relationships, security, control of resources, physical maturity and strength, physical dominance and height. Natural selection has accentuated these preferences, leading to the evolution of mate values in relation to what females find desirable in their male counterparts.

== Cross-cultural differences ==
Cross-cultural influences in regards to mate value is another factor that have been studied extensively. When looking at body attributes of women such as waist–hip ratio (WHR), there has been research looking into the variation in preference. Douglas and Shepard (1998) found that Peruvian Tribe men had a preference for a high WHR in comparison to the Western preference of a low WHR, leading the authors to speculate that "many ‘cross-cultural’ tests in evolutionary psychology may have only reflected the pervasiveness of western media." Another study looked at artists' representations of males and females in sculptures. When comparing Indian, African, Greek and Egyptian WHR, they all vary across the cultures. However, one common feature across all the cultures is that women are always depicted with a lower WHR than men.

Another study, by Buss et al. (1990), looked at mate preferences in 37 different cultures and found that Indians, Chinese, Arabs and Indonesians place a huge emphasis on chastity, whereby both males and females place high importance on finding a mate who has not engaged in previous sexual experience. Saying this, Buss et al. (2001) also found that certain traits such as financial prospects and attractiveness remained relatively stable across cultures. While there is some evidence for the importance of WHR and other physical attractiveness, Wetsman and Marlowe (1999) looked at research from a Tanzanian tribe and found that WHR was not considered an important measure of attractiveness and therefore mate value.

== Sex differences ==
Mate value has been seen to differ between males and females. Various studies have been conducted to determine what these are, and the extent to which they exist. Researchers have found that men place a much bigger emphasis on the reproductive capacity of a mate in order to ensure they are able to produce offspring. This reproductive capacity may be determined by focusing on the youth and attractiveness of a woman. The same study also found that women place a greater importance on financial prospects, status and other qualities that are needed for the long-term survival of the offspring when selecting a mate.

Ben Hamida, Mineka and Bailey (1998) have also looked into sex differences in mate preference. It seems that men tend to select traits such as attractiveness, youth and body shape and size, suggesting a preference for uncontrollable qualities. This however differs from what women focus on, which are traits that are thought to be controlled, such as status, ambition, job prospects and physical strength.

Furthermore, women are more interested in the ability to provide resources in men. Trivers (1972) suggested that this was the case due to the higher obligatory biological parental investment. Parental investment refers to how many resources, physical and emotional, that a parent expends on their offspring. As females carry the offspring throughout pregnancy as well as physically giving birth to them, they have the higher obligatory investment in the offspring than males do. Consequently, they require a mate with attributes that means they will be able to support and provide for the offspring once it has been born. Women, therefore, aim to have partners that are willing to invest into them and their offspring.

Although there are differences in mate values between males and females; Buss (1989) also found that traits such as intelligence and health are rated equally in terms of importance by both men and women. This suggests that although there are obvious differences, there are also inherent similarities between the two.

== Attractiveness ==
When looking at what affects mate value, attractiveness and body features seem to be a consistent indicator with certain characteristics predicting an increased mate value. Fink and Penton-Voak (2002) found that the symmetry of a face is one method used to determine a person's attractiveness. People tend to value a high level of similarity when considering a potential mate. Another study looked at the effects of self-perceived attractiveness on mate preference and found that females who consider themselves above average attractiveness tended to prefer mates of a higher masculinity.

The Waist–hip ratio (WHR) of women is a feature that can be used to measure mate value. When males look for a long-term partner, they are looking for a healthy female with good reproductive value, and WHR is a good measure of both. There is also a strong preference for bigger breasts, as well as a low WHR when considering both short and long-term partners. When females look for potential male mates, they look at different features to men. It seems that averageness and texture of the face play an important part in attractiveness of men. When looking at short-term mates, male attractiveness is rated higher than when looking for long-term mates, where other factors such as resources and financial prospects are more highly valued.

== Sexual strategies ==
Sexual strategies theory, as defined by Buss and Schmitt, focuses on the strategies implemented by both men and women in acquiring mates. From an evolutionary perspective and Parental Investment Theory, males are identified as showing preference for short-term mates, with the sexual strategy aimed to increase the number of offspring they produce, whilst providing limited parental investment. On the other hand, females display preferences for long-term mates and are choosier in their mate, due to the raised parental investment (pregnancy) and want to enhance the reproductive success of their offspring.

Research has proposed that mate value will influence the strategies used by individuals, stating that individuals with high mate value are able to implement their preferred sexual strategy in comparison to those with lower mate value. For example, men demonstrate preferences for short-term mates; those of higher mate value will be perceived as more desirable, associated with preferred traits such as status and resources. Thus, males of greater perceived mate value are more likely to fulfil the evolutionary preference for multiple short-term mates. Muehlenbein (2010) states "men of high-mate value and women of low mate-value will pursue short-term mating strategies." In essence, those of lower mate value are perceived as less attractive by potential mates, and as a result are less successful in mate selection and retaining mates. Both males and females wish to obtain the highest quality of mate. Strategies such as mate guarding are often implemented to ensure investment and interest of mate is continued.

Furthermore, short-term mating is a suggested technique in order to access a potential partner's mate value; a strategy implemented by the younger population prior to producing offspring. However, a change in strategy from short-term to long-term will occur when a potential partner has a desirable mate value.

== Mate guarding ==
Mate value is also closely linked to mate guarding. Since physical attractiveness is an important component of mate value, there is a clear association between greater physical attractiveness, therefore high mate value, and high mate guarding. Buss (2002) explains that if a partner's mate value is higher than one's own, there is a greater likelihood that competitors will be interested in their partner. This increased perception of threat from others, will lead to more intense mate guarding. A study by Holden et al. (2014), looked at the effect of husbands' self-esteem, and perceived mate value of their wives, on mate guarding. These researchers posited that husbands with lower self-esteem will exhibit mate guarding behaviors. Therefore, mate guarding increases when one's own perceived mate value is low and one's partner's is high. The threat of rivals and the possibility of infidelity causes individuals to guard their mates more closely to maintain their relationship.

== Self-esteem ==
From an evolutionary perspective, research states that self-esteem (SE) is a tool which individuals use to calculate their own mate value for long-term relationships.

The selection of mates and the possibility of the rejection and acceptance is closely associated with an individual's self-esteem. Zeigler-Hill & Shackelford (2015), state that this is due to individuals placing importance on their different values (own mate value), i.e. how attractive they believe they are as a potential partner. Supporting the Sociometer model of self-esteem, Leary et al. (1995), concluded that social inclusion or exclusion corresponded to the participants' level of self-esteem. For example, those who are rejected will experience a lower self-esteem. Kavanagh et al. (2010), also tested the concept of acceptance and rejection; concluding that levels of self-esteem can alter mating aspirations and mate choice.

Research by Brase & Guy (2004) looked specifically at factors affecting an individual's self-esteem with regards to mate value. It was found that factors such as age, sex and marital status were closely associated with an individual's estimate of own mate value. Consequently, individuals attempted to raise their perceived own mate value, demonstrating mate value to be a great predictor of self-esteem. Increased levels of received parental investment in childhood is also associated with increased self-reported mate value in adults, possibly mediated by increased self-esteem.

=== Sex differences ===
Zeigler-Hill et al. (2015) state that both sexes experience lower self-esteem when rejected, particularly when traits deemed important by themselves and others, are devalued. However, noticeable sex differences have been highlighted by researchers, Penke & Denissen (2008) indicated that self-esteem was more closely associated with self-perceived mate value in males. Research concluded that, unlike women, males' own mate value had a great effect on their self-belief, however only if they had experienced successful short-term mating previously.

The work of Penke & Denissen (2008) was not applicable to those in a long-term relationship. Shackelford (1998) looked at individuals in a marital context and results showed that a husband's self-esteem was negatively correlated with a women's infidelity and complaints, whereas a women's self-esteem was positively correlated with ratings of physical attractiveness. Additionally, Berscheid & Walster found that men with lower self-esteem tended not to approach women perceived as physically attractive, supporting the relationship between self-esteem and perceived mate value.

== Aggression ==
Physical attractiveness, being one of the most important signals of mate value, has contributed towards the display of aggression amongst men and women. The high mate value associated with attractiveness has been shown to be a positive predictor of aggression. Men and women feel like they need to exhibit aggression in order to compete more successfully (i.e. intimidate their rivals) and as a result, reducing their competitors' mate value. In this way, aggression can help to minimize a threat and reduce another's mate value in order to improve one's own self-image and increase self-esteem.

A study by Webster and Kirkpatrick (2006), suggested that aggression may occur in order for individuals to protect their higher status and establish who is the stronger mating competitor between themselves and those that they deem to be of less competition due to their lower mate value. Buss (2003) demonstrated that males who tend to use aggression within their relationships, and resort to spousal battering, are males who are of lower mate value than their partners. Due to their lower mate value, these males feel a greater amount of fear about a partner being disloyal and potentially cheating, leading them to become more aggressive. Nevertheless, Archer and Thanzami demonstrated that it was males who perceived themselves to be more attractive who were also more physically aggressive. This finding is perhaps more in line with the sexual selection based notion that, overall, males tend to exhibit more aggression.

== See also ==
- Sexual capital
- Sexual economics
- Assortative mating
- Mate choice in humans
