= Neumania papillator =

Scientific classification
- Kingdom: Animalia
- Phylum: Arthropoda
- Subphylum: Chelicerata
- Class: Arachnida
- Order: Trombidiformes
- Family: Unionicolidae
- Genus: Neumania
- Species: N. papillator

Binomial name
- Neumania papillator Marshall, 1922

Species of mite

Neumania papillator is a water mite in the genus Neumania and is known in behavioural ecology as an example of sensory exploitation - males of this species hijack existing female sensory abilities for their own gain in courtship.

== Description ==
Neumania papillator was first described by Ruth Marshall in 1922, the specific epithet papillator was applied due to its prominent papilla. John C. Conroy provides a technical description of the species in A Revision Of The Species Of The Genus Neumania Sensu Stricto In North America, With Descriptions Of Seven New Species (Third Part) (see References), and notes that whilst the species was originally recorded in Wisconsin, Louisiana, Tennessee and Pennsylvania he could not identify the precise location of the recorded Wisconsin population: he could not see the "Lauderlae Lakes" on any maps. It is listed as one of the species present in the "Maritime Atlantic Ecozone". The holotype collected by Marshall at this location on 13 August 1913 is currently held at the Field Museum of Natural History, as is the female allotype also collected by Marshall on 9 August 1915.

Neumania papillator is soft bodied, covered with small spines and has six legs. John C. Conroy examined 13 males and 43 females, and recorded mean male lengths of 0.46 mm (range: 0.397-0.504 mm) and mean female lengths of 0.563 mm (range: 0.525-0.641 mm); Ruth Marshall's original description differed slightly with males and females recorded as 0.6 and 0.78 mm respectively. It has been recorded at a depth of 5 metres. Larvae of the Eastern forktail damselfly (Ischnura verticalis), larvae of skimmer dragonflies in the genus Libellula and adult water mites of the genus Limnesia have all been observed preying on N. papillator.

== Behaviour ==
Both sexes of Neumania papillator are ambush predators - perching among the fronds of the aquatic vegetation, they hunt copepods (small crustaceans) which pass by in the water column. When hunting N. papillator adopts a characteristic stance termed the 'net stance' - their first four legs are held out into the water column, with their four hind legs resting on aquatic vegetation. This allows them to detect vibrational stimuli produced by swimming prey and thus orient towards and then clutch at the prey. During courtship, males actively search (swimming/walking) for females - if a male finds a female, he slowly circles around her whilst trembling his first and second leg near the female. Males and females do not directly copulate; sexual reproduction involves the male depositing six to eighteen spermatophores onto the substrate in front of the female - if the female is sexually receptive she rubs the ventral (front) surface of her abdomen (her venter) over the spermatophore, and later transfers these to her genital aperture.

=== Courtship behaviour ===
Dr. Heather Proctor (formerly at the University of Toronto, now at the University of Alberta) studied the courtship behaviour of Neumania papillator, and noticed that male leg trembling caused females (who were in the 'net stance') to orient towards and then often clutch the male. This did not damage the male or deter further courtship; the male then deposited spermatophores and began to vigorously fan and jerk his fourth pair of legs over the spermatophore, generating a current of water that passed over the spermatophores and towards the female, for about 60 seconds. Sperm packet uptake by the female would sometimes follow. Proctor hypothesised that the vibrations the trembling male legs made were done to mimic the vibrations that females detect from swimming prey - this would trigger the female's prey-detection response causing females to orient and then clutch at males, mediating courtship. If this was true and males were exploiting female predation responses, then hungry females should be more receptive to male trembling - Proctor found that unfed captive females did orient and clutch at males significantly more than fed captive females did, consistent with the sensory exploitation hypothesis. Further evidence for the sensory exploitation hypothesis resulted from a cladistic analysis comparing 28 characters between other water mites of the family Unionicolidae and identified the most likely evolutionary scenario (the fewest reversal of character states and the fewer parallel evolution of character states (homoplasies)) for the origin of both the trembling behaviour and the 'net stance'. If male courtship trembling behaviour only ever evolved after the net stance evolved in the species analyzed, then this support the idea that trembling was an exploitation of a preexisting female sensory system. The cladograms generated showed two equally plausible evolutionary histories: the 'net stance' and trembling either evolved concomitantly in the common ancestor of Neumania and Unionicola (a closely related mite in the same family (confamilial)) or net stance evolved and then trembling evolved twice afterwards. The former scenario is ambiguous and is not evidence for or against the sensory exploitation hypothesis, whilst the latter supports it.

Water mite eyes cannot form images, so Proctor suggests that males benefit from females reorientation and clutching to detect when he is directly in front of the female and should deposit spermatophores; it may also prevent males depositing spermatophores responding to residual chemical stimuli left by a female on a now empty perch (trembling was observed at recently deserted perches but never spermatophore deposition). The fanning of water over the spermatophores towards the female probably serves to move pheromones from the male to the female - this phenomenon is known in many other non-copulating arthropods, and Proctor observed that females only cease predatory behaviours and initiate courtship behaviours after receiving the chemical signals.

There is no evidence that males deposited spermatophores preferentially based on female virginity or on female hunger level, though virgin females do remain with courting males for longer than non-virgin females. When multiple males were with one female no antagonism is displayed between males in the trembling stage of courtship - but as soon as one male deposits spermatophores, often a second male tramples on the spermatophores and then attempts to interfere with the other male's fanning - the latter an attempt to stop pheromones from the fanning male's spermatophore from reaching the female.

=== Sex ratios ===
Water mite sex ratios are often biased towards females in the wild - but Proctor found a disharmony between sex ratios of Neumania papillator in the field and in laboratory conditions, with male biased sex ratios in the field and female biased sex ratios in the laboratory. Possible explanations for the male-biased field sex ratio were differential predation (predators eating females more than males proportionally) or it could have been caused by susceptibility to starvation, however these were refuted experimentally: invertebrate predators preferred males to females, and starved males died on average 40 days before starved females. The sex ratio at 'emergence' (the transition from deutonymphs (juveniles) to tritonymph (preadult resting stage) was female-biased, hence the discord could not be explained by any bias at emergence either.

Proctor identified three remaining possible explanations for the differing sex ratios:

1. Differing depth preferences between the sexes combined with only sampling shallow regions; this could possibly be potentiated by female mites preparing for overwintering by burying themselves within the substrate.
2. Sweeping the net when collecting may bias the sampled sex ratio, if it is the case that when disturbed, females are more likely to cling strongly to aquatic plants whilst males are more likely to swim
3. If sex determination is environmental, then variation in light and/or temperature between the field and laboratory could produce the observed discord

However Proctor noted that only hydryphantid mites (a subfamily of mites from the superfamily Stygothrombioidea (suborder Prostigmata)) have been observed burying themselves in the substrate to prepare for overwintering, that laboratory experiments found no evidence for sex-based disturbance responses and that environmental sex determination has not yet been observed in arachnids.
