= Mating =

Process of pairing in biology

In biology, mating refers to the pairing of either opposite-sex or hermaphroditic organisms for the purpose of sexual reproduction. For most species, mating is between two individuals of opposite sexes; however, for hermaphroditic species, copulation is not required because the parent organism is capable of self-fertilization (autogamy). The basis of this is a process called fertilization, which is the fusion of two gametes. One gamete from the female (egg) and one gamete from the male (sperm) is used for fertilization. Copulation is the union of the sex organs of two sexually reproducing animals for insemination and subsequent internal fertilization. Mating may also lead to external fertilization, as seen in amphibians, bony fishes and plants. The term mating also applies to similar processes in fungi and unicellular protists.

Additionally, in ethology "mating" refers to the sexual activity between two individuals (referred to as "mates") regardless of their sex.

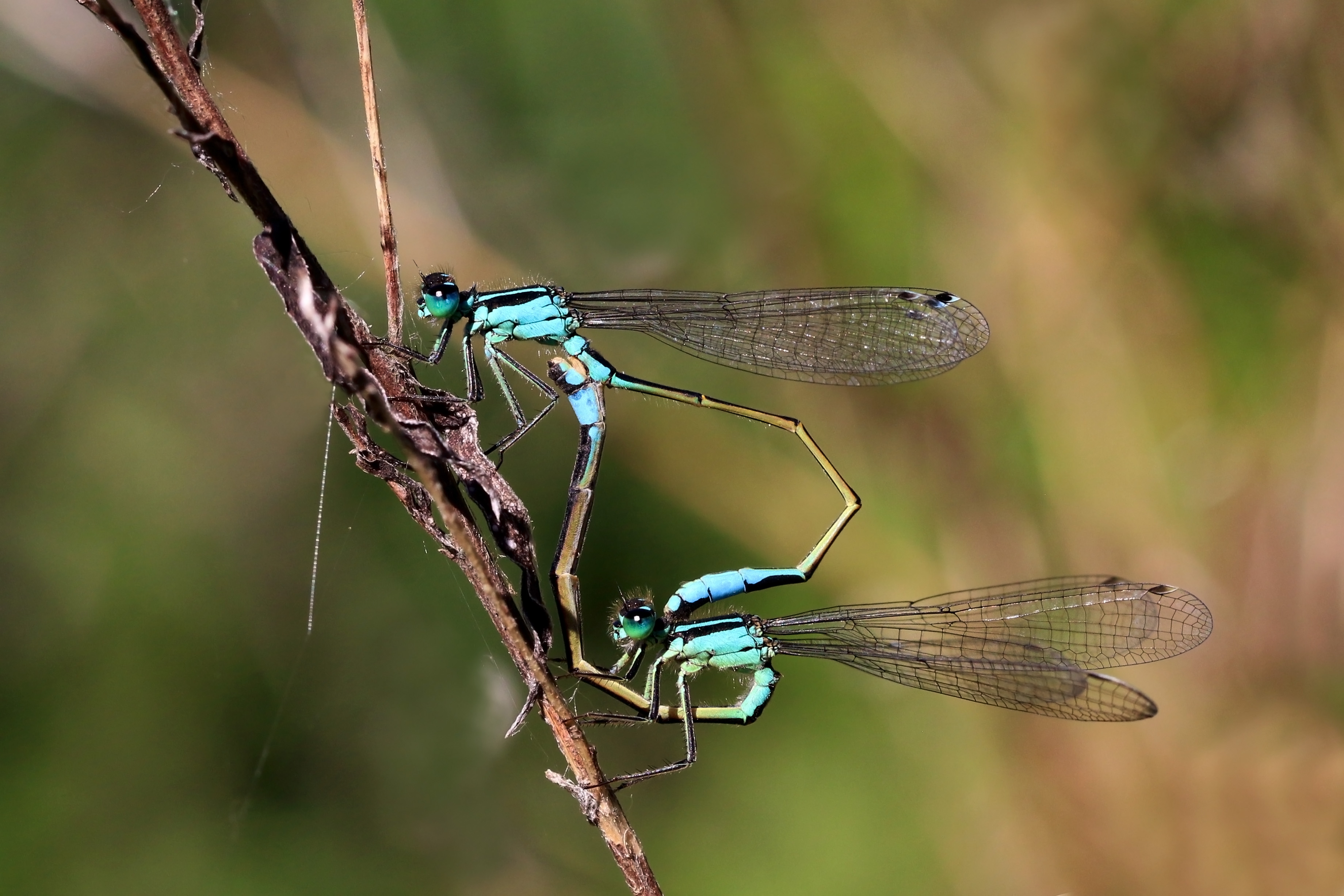
Blue-tailed damselflies (Ischnura elegans) mating

== Animals ==
Animals have multiple different mating strategies, or different ways that copulation can occur. These include random mating, disassortative mating, or assortative mating. Some animals will choose a mate based on their expressed phenotype, or the way they look. The human practice of live mating and artificially inseminating domesticated animals is part of animal husbandry. There are various types of mating strategies used for these animals such as pen mating (when a female is moved into a pen with a male) or paddock mating (where one male is let loose in the paddock with several females). Current agriculture practices are utilizing artificial insemination more to avoid using live mating. Mammals perform copulation via penile-vaginal penetration and ejaculation of semen.

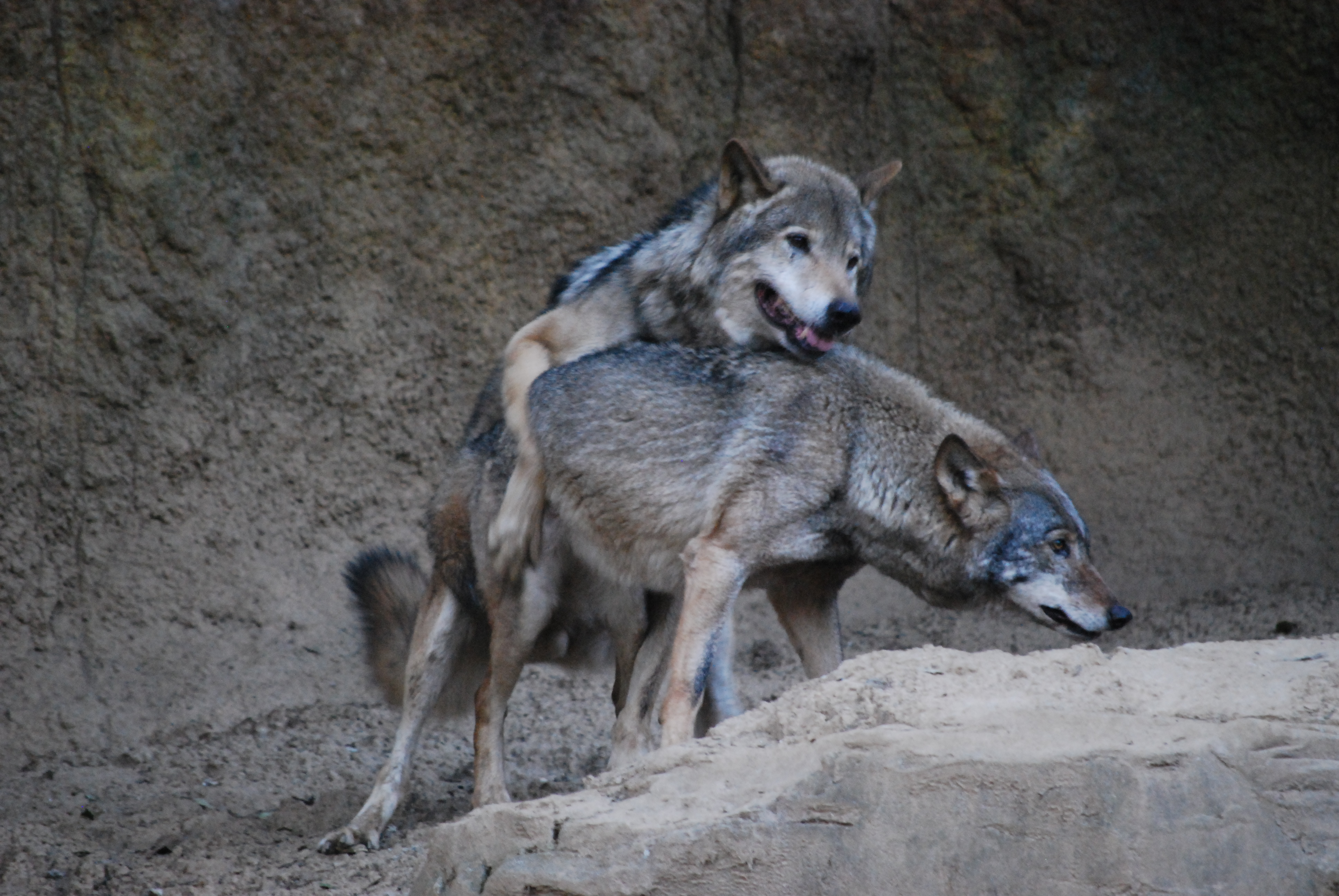
Gray wolves mating

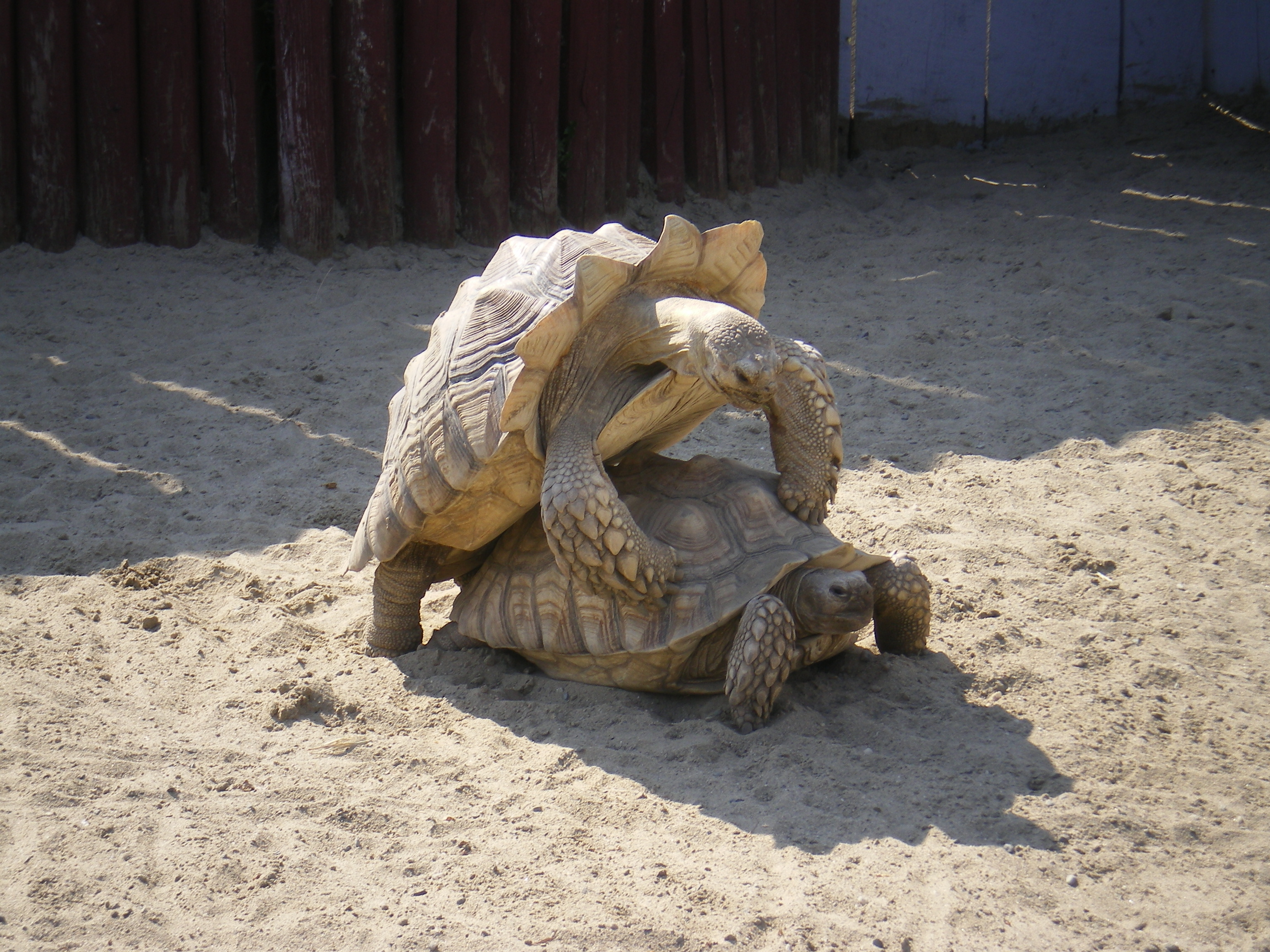
African spurred tortoises mating

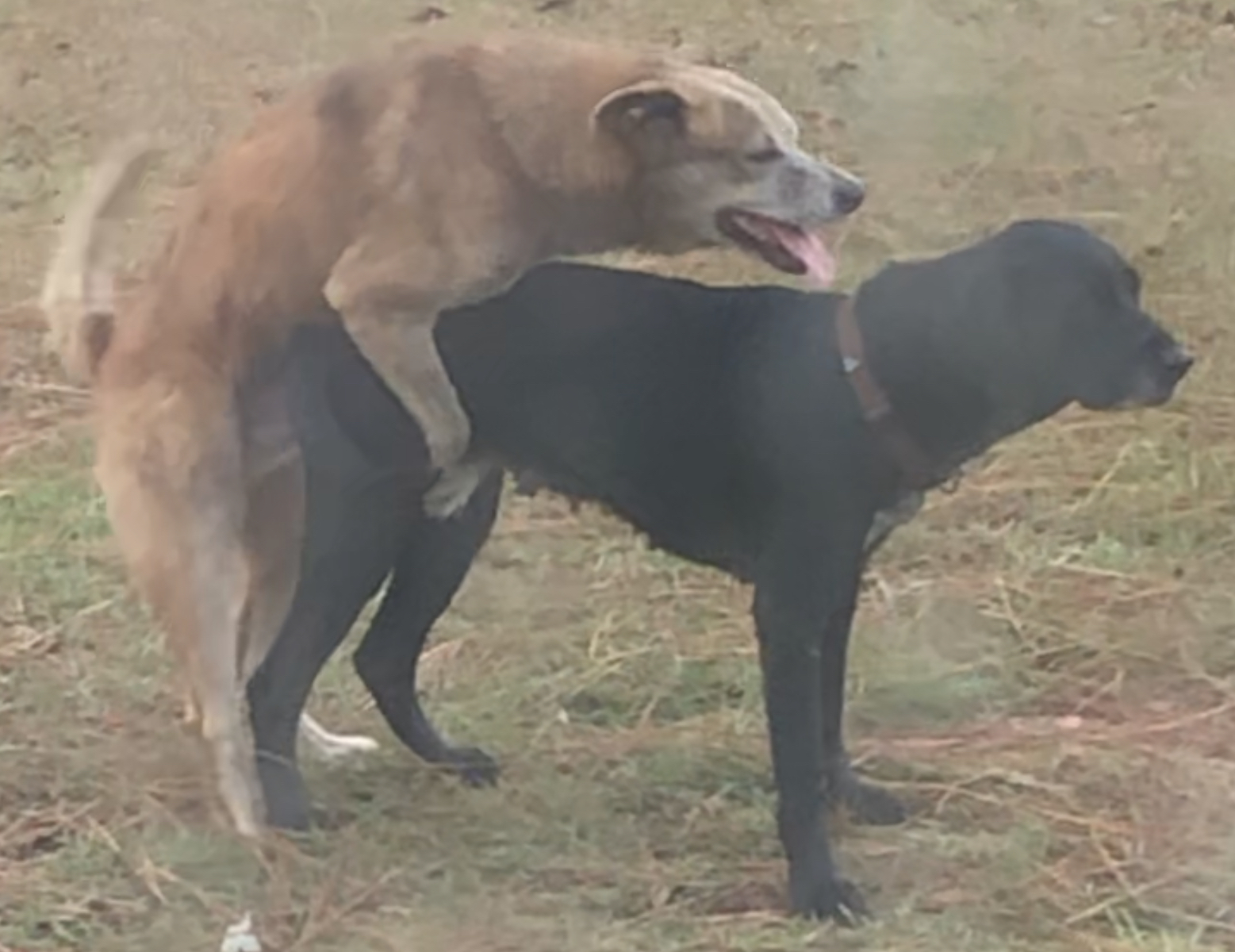
Dogs mating

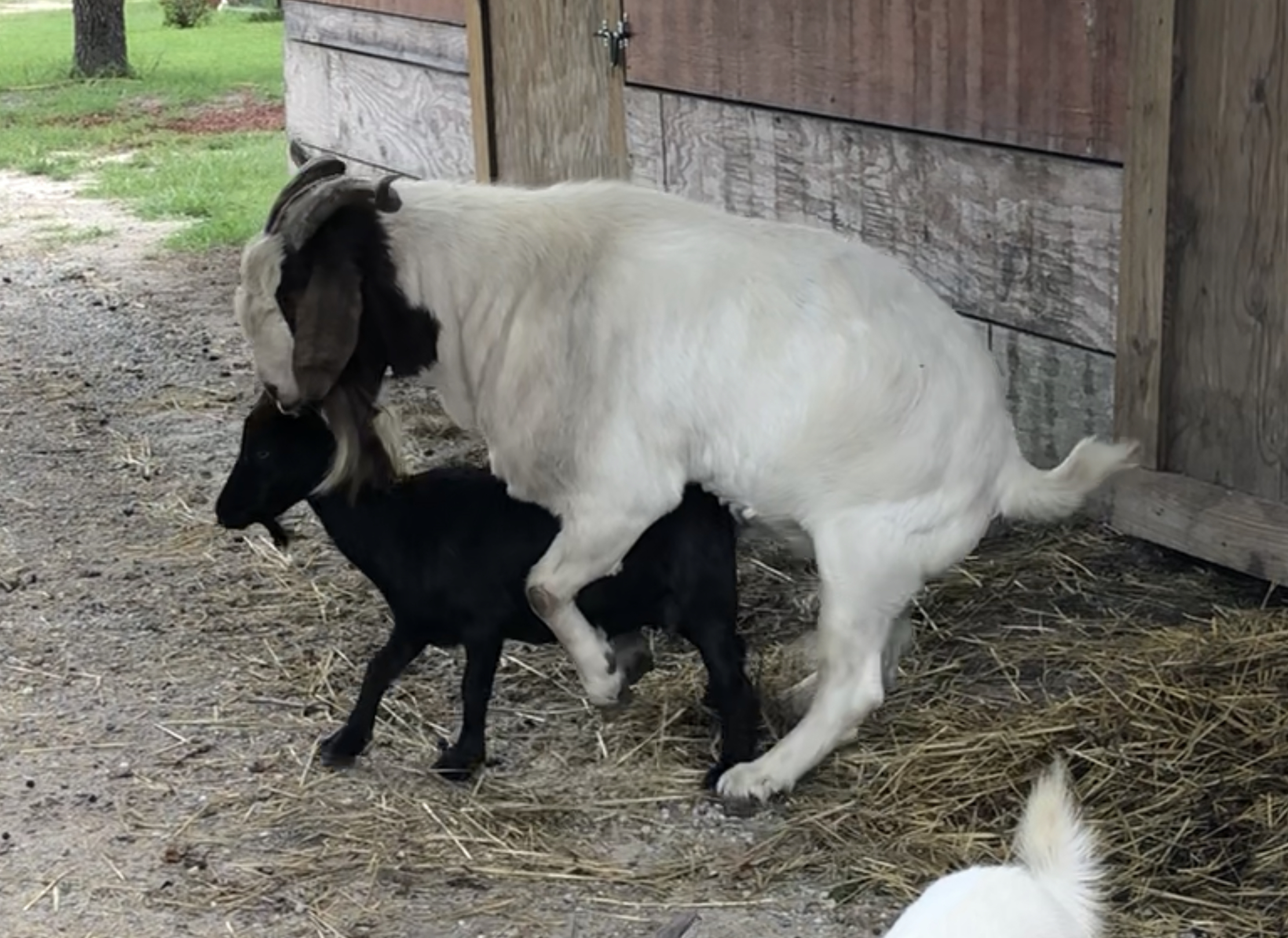
Goats mating

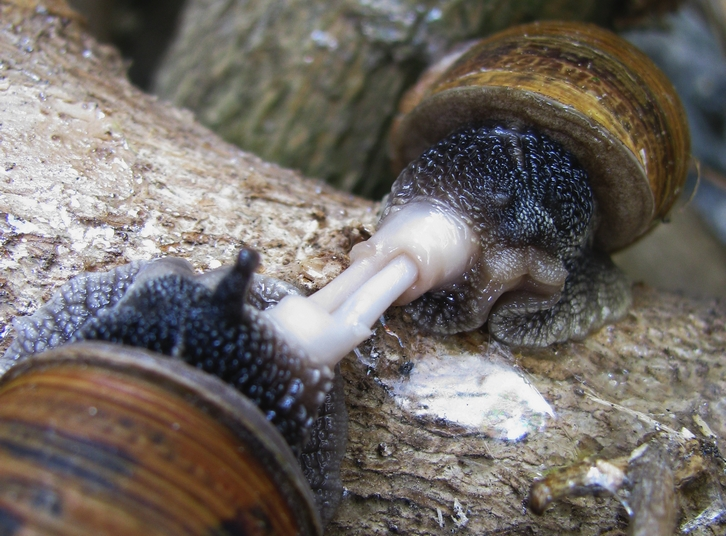
Hermaphroditic snails mating

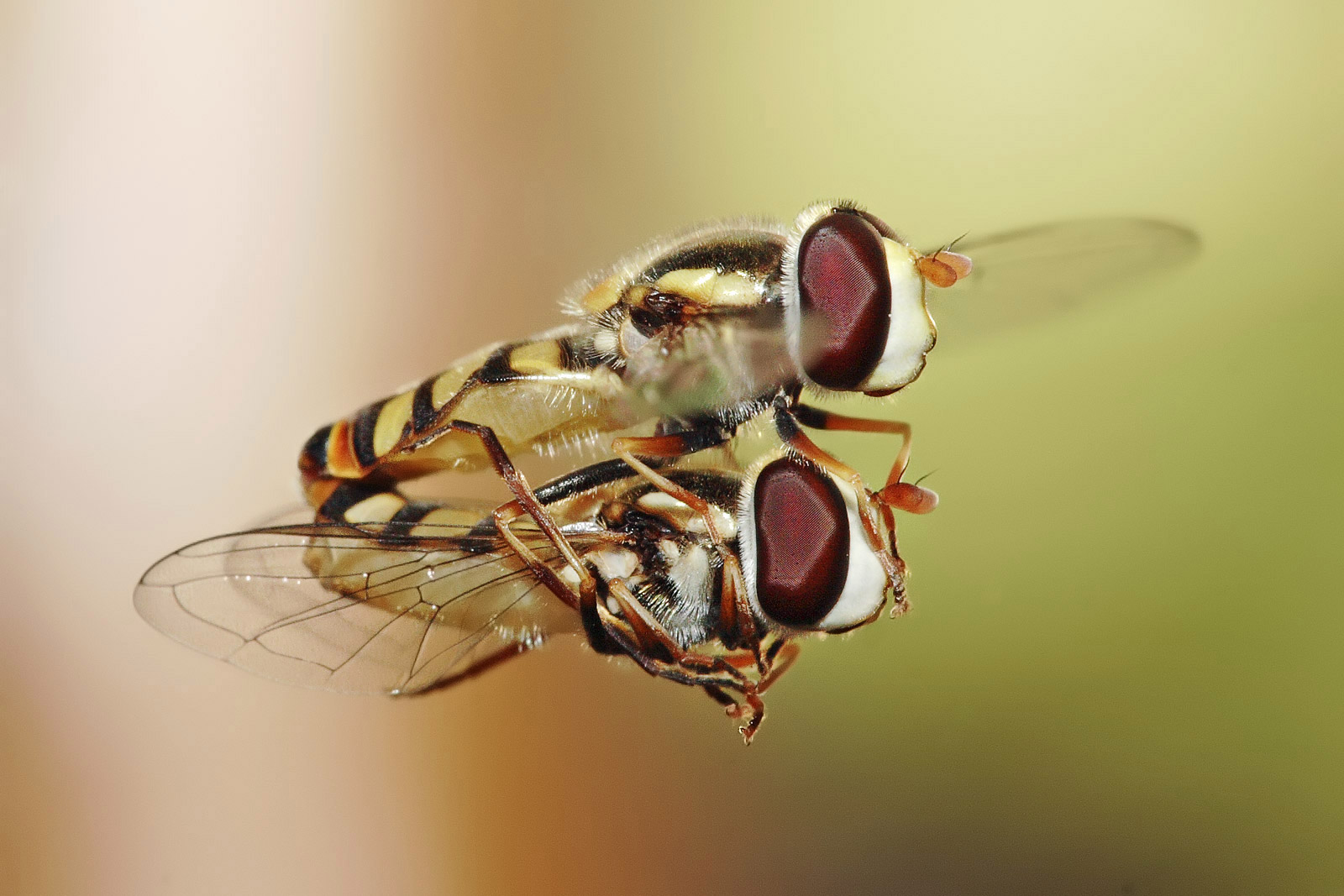
Hoverflies mating in midair

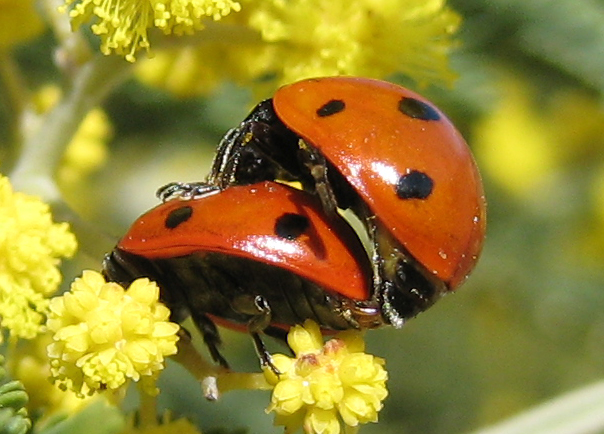
Ladybugs mating

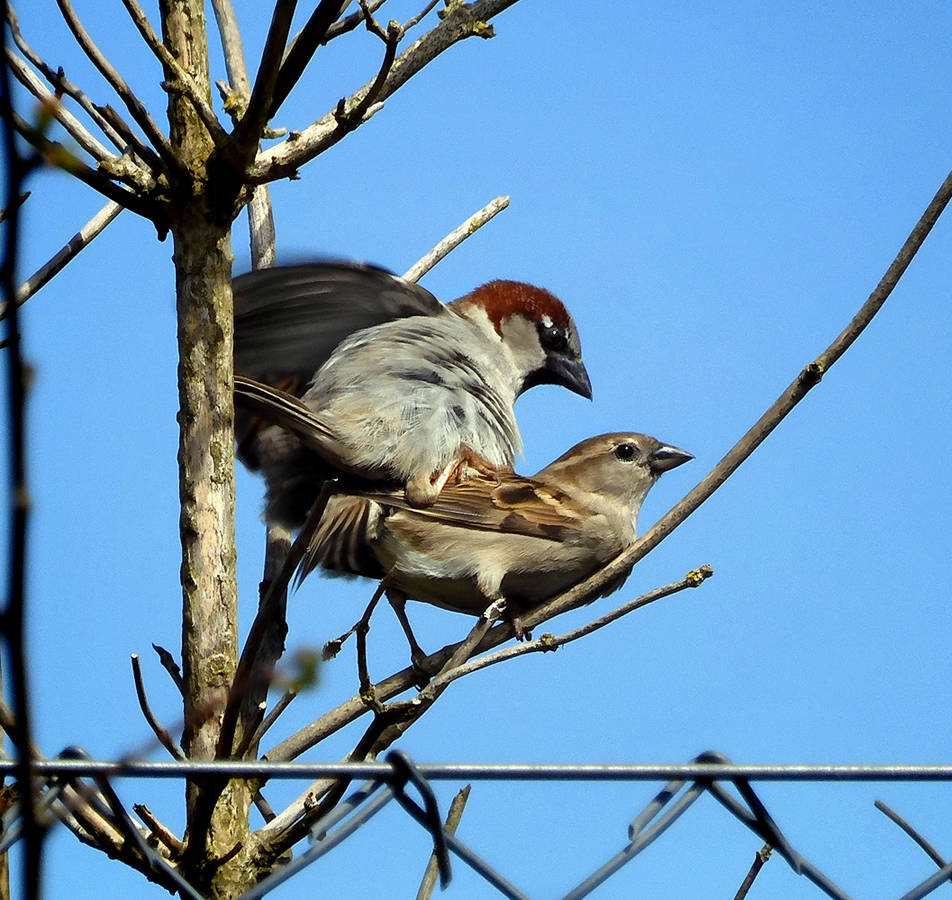
House sparrows mating

In direct copulation in insects, the male uses its aedeagus, a structure formed from the terminal segments of the abdomen, to deposit sperm directly (though sometimes in a capsule called a spermatophore) into the female's reproductive tract. Courtship occurs before copulation and is often facilitated after receiving a chemical signal from pheromones. Some insects exhibit post-mating behaviors. It's a common occurrence for the females to store the sperm in order to continuously fertilize eggs for a period of time without having to mate again. Other behaviors include mate protection, sexual cannibalism, or chemical manipulation to prevent mating with other insects.

Other animals reproduce sexually with external fertilization, including many fish species. Certain vertebrates reproduce with internal fertilization through cloacal copulation. This occurs in reptiles, some fish, and most birds.

== Plants and fungi ==
Like in animals, mating in plants, fungi, and other Eukaryotes requires other methods for sexual conjugation. In vascular plants this is mostly achieved without physical contact between mating individuals. Plant pollen has the capability to produce the male gametes required for fertilization. A process called pollination is facilitated by animals in order to bring the male gametes to the female flowers. The animals (example: bees) will collect the pollen and disperse it, allowing plants to be externally fertilized. In fungi, no distinguishable male or female organs exist. Fungi are primarily haploid organisms, only becoming diploid for a short period of time during karyogamy. Karyogamy is the final stage of sexual reproduction in fungi where the parental nuclei fuse to create a diploid cell with both parents genetic information. This new cell becomes a haploid again following meiosis. Yeasts are eukaryotic microorganisms classified as fungi. Yeast reproduces asexually through a process called budding where a daughter cell grows out of the parent cell and receives its own nucleus before splitting. Under high stress conditions, like nutrient starvation, haploid cells will die; under the same conditions, however, diploid cells of certain strains of yeast can undergo sporulation by entering sexual reproduction (meiosis) and producing a variety of haploid spores, which can go on to mate (conjugate) and reform the diploid.

== Protists ==
Protists are a large group of diverse eukaryotic microorganisms, mainly unicellular animals and plants, that do not form tissues. The earliest eukaryotes were likely protists. Mating and sexual reproduction are widespread among existing eukaryotes. In many eukaryotic species, mating is promoted by sex pheromones. Based on phylogenetic analysis, its proposed that facultative sex was present in the common ancestor of all eukaryotes and is widely utilized in protists.

Most protists reproduce asexually through binary or multiple fission. Many protists are also capable of sexual reproduction and can alternate between asexual and sexual. Protists generally reproduce asexually under favorable environmental conditions, but tend to reproduce sexually under stressful conditions, such as starvation or heat shock. Sexual reproduction can lead to combinations of genes that give the offspring an environmental advantage however there is also risk of developing cysts. Protists will often wait until the environment is favorable to reduce the risk of cysts.

== See also ==
- Heterosexuality
- Animal husbandry
- Breeding in the wild
- Breeding season
- Evolution of sex
- Lordosis behavior
- Mate choice copying
- Mating system
- Reproduction
- Sex determination system
- Sexual conflict
- Sexual intercourse
