= Animal breeding (disambiguation) =

Animal breeding may refer to:

- Animal breeding, the breeding of animals by humans
  - Captive breeding
- Breeding in the wild
