= Hygrobates lacrima =

Scientific classification
- Kingdom: Animalia
- Phylum: Arthropoda
- Subphylum: Chelicerata
- Class: Arachnida
- Order: Trombidiformes
- Family: Hygrobatidae
- Genus: Hygrobates
- Species: H. lacrima

Binomial name
- Hygrobates lacrima Pešić, 2020

Species of mite

Hygrobates lacrima is a species of mite in the family Hygrobatidae found in Montenegro.

== Distribution ==
This species is endemic to Montenegro. It is currently known only from the River Tara canyon system.
