= Pionopsis =

Scientific classification
- Domain: Eukaryota
- Kingdom: Animalia
- Phylum: Arthropoda
- Subphylum: Chelicerata
- Class: Arachnida
- Order: Trombidiformes
- Family: Pionidae
- Genus: Pionopsis; Piersig, 1894

Genus of arachnids

Pionopsis is a genus of mites belonging to the family Pionidae.

The species of this genus are found in Europe and Northern America.

Species:

- Pionopsis fragilis Habeeb, 1954
- Pionopsis latilamellis Marshall, 1924
- Pionopsis lutescens (Hermann, 1804)
