= Breeding in the wild =

Animal reproduction in a natural habitat

Breeding in the wild is the natural process of animal reproduction occurring in the natural habitat of a given species. This terminology is distinct from animal husbandry or breeding of species in captivity. Breeding locations are often chosen for very specific requirements of shelter and proximity to food; moreover, the breeding season is a particular time window that has evolved for each species to suit species anatomical, mating-ritual, or climatic and other ecological factors. Many species migrate considerable distances to reach the requisite breeding locations. Certain common characteristics apply to various taxa within the animal kingdom, which traits are often sorted among amphibians, reptiles, mammals, avafauna, arthropods and lower life forms.

== Amphibians ==
For many amphibians, an annual breeding cycle applies, typically regulated by ambient temperature, precipitation, availability of surface water and food supply. This breeding season is accentuated in temperate regions, where prolonged aestivation or hibernation renders many amphibian species inactive for prolonged periods. Breeding habitats are typically ponds and streams.

== Mammals ==
Annual breeding cycles sometimes apply to mammals, with regulating environmental effects including seasonal temperature variation and food availability. Migration patterns of a mammal may sometimes govern breeding times. Mammal breeding in the wild sometimes involves the use of maternity dens for birthing and protection of the young. The polar bear is an example of a mammal who uses a maternity den, whose locations are influenced by migration movements of this species to the seasonal Arctic pack ices. In particular, the polar bears who breed in Wapusk National Park need to migrate to the Hudson Bay pack ice.

== Effects of inbreeding in wild populations ==
Keller and Waller reviewed the effects of inbreeding in wild-populations. Evidence from mammalian and bird populations indicated that inbreeding depression often significantly adversely affects birth weight, reproduction and survival, as well as resistance to environmental stress, disease and predation. Plant studies have shown significant adverse inbreeding effects on seed set, germination, resistance to stress and survival. Inbreeding depression is considered to be largely due to the expression of recessive deleterious alleles.

== See also ==
- Animal sexual behavior
- Maternity den
- Mate choice copying
