= Pionidae =

Scientific classification
- Kingdom: Animalia
- Phylum: Arthropoda
- Subphylum: Chelicerata
- Class: Arachnida
- Order: Trombidiformes
- Superfamily: Hygrobatoidea
- Family: Pionidae; Thor, 1900

Family of mites

Pionidae is a family of prostigs in the order Trombidiformes. There are about 15 genera and at least 90 described species in Pionidae.

== Genera ==
- Forelia Haller, 1882
- Huitfeldtia Thor, 1898
- Hydrochoreutes C. L. Koch, 1837
- Najadicola Piersig, 1897
- Nautarachna Moniez, 1888
- Neotiphys Habeeb, 1957
- Piona C. L. Koch, 1842
- Pionacercus Piersig, 1894
- Pionella Viets, 1937
- Pionopsis Piersig, 1894
- Pseudofeltria Soar, 1904
- Schminkea
- Tiphys C. L. Koch, 1836
- Twinforksella
- Wettina Piersig, 1892
