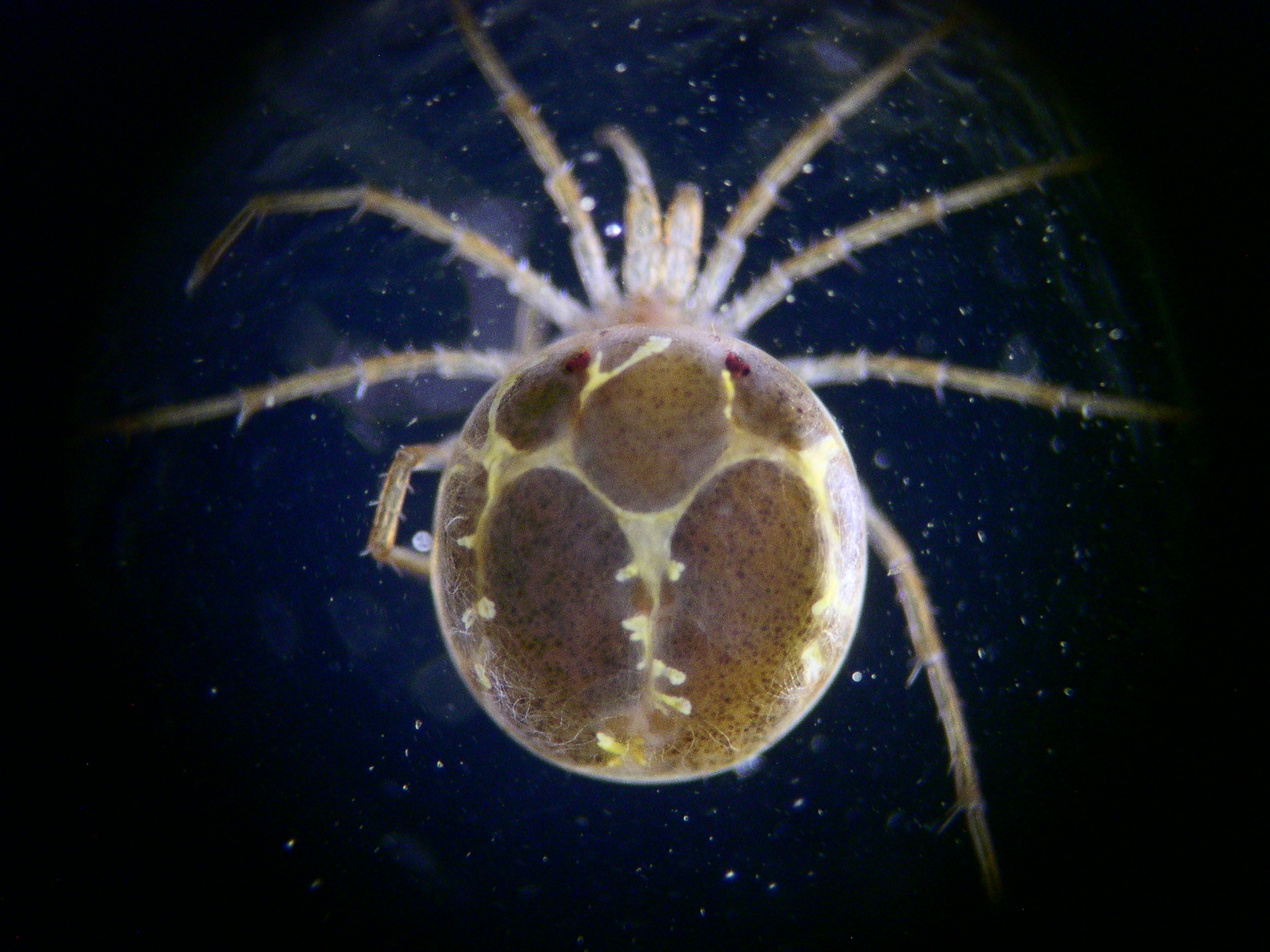
- Hygrobates fluviatilis

Scientific classification
- Kingdom: Animalia
- Phylum: Arthropoda
- Subphylum: Chelicerata
- Class: Arachnida
- Order: Trombidiformes
- Suborder: Prostigmata
- Infraorder: Anystina
- Superfamily: Hygrobatoidea; C.L.Koch, 1842

Families
- Hygrobatidae; Limnesiidae; Pionidae; Unionicolidae

= Hygrobatoidea =

Superfamily of mites

Hygrobatoidea is a superfamily of water mites found in North America.
