= Hydrochoreutes =

Scientific classification
- Domain: Eukaryota
- Kingdom: Animalia
- Phylum: Arthropoda
- Subphylum: Chelicerata
- Class: Arachnida
- Order: Trombidiformes
- Family: Pionidae
- Genus: Hydrochoreutes; Koch, 1837

Genus of spiders

Hydrochoreutes is a genus of mites belonging to the family Pionidae.

Species:

- Hydrochoreutes intermedius Cook, 1956
- Hydrochoreutes michiganensis Cook
- Hydrochoreutes microporus Cook
- Hydrochoreutes schizopetiolatus Cook
- Hydrochoreutes ungulatus (Koch, 1836)
