= Forelia =

Scientific classification
- Kingdom: Animalia
- Phylum: Arthropoda
- Subphylum: Chelicerata
- Class: Arachnida
- Order: Trombidiformes
- Family: Pionidae
- Genus: Forelia; Haller, 1882

Genus of mites

Forelia is a genus of arachnids belonging to the family Pionidae.

The genus was first described by Haller in 1882.

The species of this genus are found in Eurasia and Northern America.

Species:

- Forelia liliacea
- Forelia variegator
