= Huitfeldtia =

Scientific classification
- Domain: Eukaryota
- Kingdom: Animalia
- Phylum: Arthropoda
- Subphylum: Chelicerata
- Class: Arachnida
- Order: Trombidiformes
- Superfamily: Hygrobatoidea
- Family: Pionidae
- Genus: Huitfeldtia; Thor, 1898
- Species: H. rectipes

Binomial name
- Huitfeldtia rectipes Thor, 1898

Genus of spiders

Huitfeldtia is a monotypic genus of mites belonging to the family Pionidae. The only species is Huitfeldtia rectipes.

The species of this genus are found in Europe and Northern America.
