= Atractides =

Scientific classification
- Kingdom: Animalia
- Phylum: Arthropoda
- Subphylum: Chelicerata
- Class: Arachnida
- Order: Trombidiformes
- Family: Hygrobatidae
- Genus: Atractides; Koch, 1836

Genus of mites

Atractides is a genus of mites belonging to the family Hygrobatidae.

The genus was first described by Koch in 1836.

The genus has cosmopolitan distribution.

== Systematics ==
There are at least 170 described species in genus Atractides:

- Atractides acutirostris Motas & C. Angelier, 1927
- Atractides adenophorus (K. H. Viets, 1930)
- Atractides adnatus Lundblad, 1956
- Atractides africanus Lundblad, 1951
- Atractides algeriensis (Lundblad, 1942)
- Atractides allgaier Gerecke, 2003
- Atractides anellatus Lundblad, 1956
- Atractides angelieri Pešić, Smit & Gerecke, 2012
- Atractides angulatus (Walter, 1926)
- Atractides angustiporus (K. H. Viets, 1930)
- Atractides arcuatus (Thor, 1914)
- Atractides arizonensis Habeeb, 1962
- Atractides asticae Petrova, 1968
- Atractides barbarae Biesiadka, 1972
- Atractides barsiensis (Szalay, 1929)
- Atractides barti Habeeb, 1979
- Atractides bisulcus Viets, 1935
- Atractides borceai (Motas, 1928)
- Atractides brasiliensis (Lundblad, 1937)
- Atractides brendle Gerecke, 2003
- Atractides canadensis Habeeb, 1955
- Atractides chelidon Gerecke, 2003
- Atractides circumcinctus Schwoerbel, 1956
- Atractides cisternarum (K. H. Viets, 1935)
- Atractides clavipalpis Lundblad, 1956
- Atractides clavipes Lundblad, 1954
- Atractides clipeatus (Viets, 1935)
- Atractides congoensis Viets, 1974
- Atractides conjunctus Viets, 1935
- Atractides constrictus (Sokolow, 1934)
- Atractides coriaceus (Viets, 1925)
- Atractides corsicus E. Angelier, 1954
- Atractides cultellatus K. H. Viets, 1930
- Atractides curvisetus (Koenike, 1911)
- Atractides denticulatus Walter, 1947
- Atractides dentiferus Viets, 1949
- Atractides digitatus Lundblad, 1954
- Atractides disabatinoi Pešić & Goldschmidt, 2023
- Atractides distans (Viets, 1914)
- Atractides elegans (Motas & Tanasachi, 1948)
- Atractides elongatus (Halbert, 1944)
- Atractides exiguus Lundblad, 1952
- Atractides firmus (Walter, 1947)
- Atractides fissus (Walter, 1927)
- Atractides fluviatilis (Szalay, 1929)
- Atractides fonticolus (Viets, 1920)
- Atractides franciscanus Bader & Gerecke, 1996
- Atractides gabretae Thon, 1901
- Atractides gallicus E. Angelier, 1963
- Atractides gassowskii (Sokolow, 1934)
- Atractides georgiensis Habeeb, 1957
- Atractides gereckei Pesic, 2004
- Atractides gibberipalpis Piersig, 1898
- Atractides gladisetus (Husiatinschi, 1937)
- Atractides glandulosus (Walter, 1918)
- Atractides gomerae Lundblad, 1962
- Atractides gorcensis Biesadka, 1972
- Atractides gracilipes (E. Angelier, 1951)
- Atractides gracilis (Sokolow, 1934)
- Atractides graecus (K. H. Viets, 1950)
- Atractides grouti Habeeb, 1965
- Atractides harrisoni Viets, 1971
- Atractides hystricipes (Lundblad, 1941)
- Atractides ibericus Lundblad, 1956
- Atractides incertus Lundblad, 1969
- Atractides inflatipalpis K. H. Viets, 1950
- Atractides inflatus (Walter, 1925)
- Atractides insulanus (Lundblad, 1941)
- Atractides iranicus Pesic & Asadi, 2002
- Atractides kilimandjaricus Lundblad, 1952
- Atractides kuehnei (Viets, 1911)
- Atractides kuhlmanni Viets, 1963
- Atractides lacustris (Lundblad, 1925)
- Atractides laetus Lundblad, 1962
- Atractides latipalpis (Motas & Tanasachi, 1946)
- Atractides latipes (Szalay, 1935)
- Atractides legeri (Motas, 1927)
- Atractides linearis (Lundblad, 1927)
- Atractides longiporus Petrova, 1968
- Atractides longirostris Walter, 1925
- Atractides longisetus Pesic, 2003
- Atractides longus (Walter, 1947)
- Atractides loricatus Piersig, 1898
- Atractides lundbladi (Halík, 1947)
- Atractides lunipes Lundblad, 1956
- Atractides macaronensis (Lundblad, 1941)
- Atractides macrolaminatus Láska, 1956
- Atractides madagascariensis Viets, 1964
- Atractides maderensis (Lundblad, 1941)
- Atractides magnipalpis Rensburg, 1971
- Atractides magnirostris (Motas & Tanasachi, 1948)
- Atractides marizae Pešić, 2023
- Atractides markaziensis Pesic, 2004
- Atractides marsus Pešić, Smit & Gerecke, 2012
- Atractides microphtalmus (Motas & Tanasachi, 1948)
- Atractides minutissimus (Lundblad, 1927)
- Atractides minutus (Walter, 1928)
- Atractides mirkopesici Pesic, 2004
- Atractides mitisi (Walter, 1944)
- Atractides moniezi (Motas, 1927)
- Atractides moravicus Láska, 1952
- Atractides mossahebii Pesic, 2004
- Atractides neomexicanus Habeeb, 1963
- Atractides neumani Lundblad, 1962
- Atractides nikooae Pesic, 2004
- Atractides nitraensis Láska, 1959
- Atractides nodipalpis (Thor, 1899)
- Atractides oblongus (Walter, 1944)
- Atractides octoporus Piersig, 1898
- Atractides orghidani Motas & Tanasachi, 1960
- Atractides orientalis (Cook, 1967)
- Atractides oudemansi (Viets, 1935)
- Atractides ovalis Koenike, 1883
- Atractides oviformis Szalay, 1953
- Atractides pachydermis (Halbert, 1944)
- Atractides pacificus Habeeb, 1964
- Atractides panniculatus (Viets, 1925)
- Atractides parviscutus (Marshall, 1915)
- Atractides pavesii Maglio, 1905
- Atractides pennatus (K. H. Viets, 1920)
- Atractides peruvianus (Lundblad, 1930)
- Atractides phreaticus (Motas & Tanasachi, 1948)
- Atractides pilosus Schwoerbel, 1961
- Atractides plaumanni (Lundblad, 1936)
- Atractides polyporus (K. H. Viets, 1922)
- Atractides porosus (Lundblad, 1936)
- Atractides prosiliens (Motas & Tanasachi, 1948)
- Atractides protendens K. O. Viets, 1955
- Atractides psammophilus Schwoerbel, 1965
- Atractides pulcher Viets, 1956
- Atractides pumilus (Szalay, 1946)
- Atractides pusillus (Walter & Bader, 1952)
- Atractides pygmaeus Motas & Tanasachi, 1948
- Atractides rectipes (Viets, 1924)
- Atractides remotus Szalay, 1953
- Atractides rivalis Lundblad, 1956
- Atractides robustus (Sokolow, 1940)
- Atractides rossicus (Thor, 1923)
- Atractides rostratus Lundblad, 1953
- Atractides rutae (Lundblad, 1941)
- Atractides samsoni (Sokolow, 1936)
- Atractides schadei (Lundblad, 1942)
- Atractides schlienzi Schweorbel, 1961
- Atractides scutifer (Lundblad, 1951)
- Atractides separatus (K. H. Viets, 1931)
- Atractides sibiricus K. O. Viets, 1987
- Atractides similis (E. Angelier, 1949)
- Atractides sokolowi (Motas & Tanasachi, 1948)
- Atractides spatiosus Viets, 1935
- Atractides spinipes C.L. Koch, 1837
- Atractides splendidus (Lundblad, 1927)
- Atractides subasper Koenike, 1902
- Atractides subterraneus (K. H. Viets, 1932)
- Atractides sudafricanus Viets, 1956
- Atractides szalayi (Motas & Tanasachi, 1948)
- Atractides tatrensis Szalay, 1953
- Atractides tener (Thor, 1899)
- Atractides tenerifensis Lundblad, 1962
- Atractides tenuipes Lundblad, 1952
- Atractides testudo Cook, 1966
- Atractides thoracatus Koenike, 1898
- Atractides torrenticolus Láska, 1960
- Atractides trapeziformis Schwoerbel, 1961
- Atractides tuberosus (Viets, 1919)
- Atractides ubinicus Tuzovskij, 1980
- Atractides vaginalis (Koenike, 1905)
- Atractides valencianus (K. H. Viets, 1930)
- Atractides vandeli E. Angelier, 1963
- Atractides violaceus Imamura, 1953
- Atractides walteri (Viets, 1925)
