= Mate choice =

Mechanism for evolution

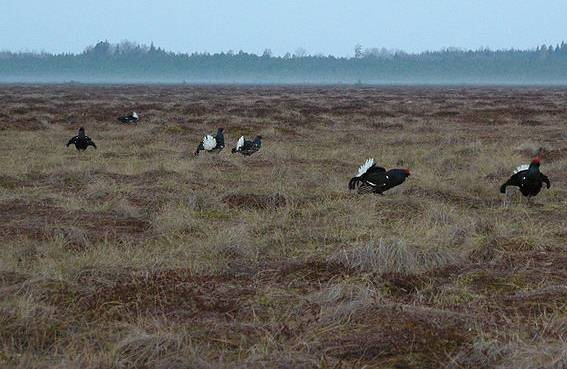
Mate choice is highly visible in lek mating. Here, black grouse males gather in a quagmire and the females then arrive and observe the male before choosing one.

Mate choice is one of the primary mechanisms under which evolution can occur. It is characterized by a "selective response by animals to particular stimuli" which can be observed as behavior. In other words, before an animal engages with a potential mate, they first evaluate various aspects of that mate which are indicative of quality—such as the resources or phenotypes they have—and evaluate whether or not those particular trait(s) are somehow beneficial to them. The evaluation will then incur a response of some sort.

These mechanisms are a part of evolutionary change because they operate in a way that causes the qualities that are desired in a mate to be more frequently passed on to each generation over time. For example, if female peacocks desire mates who have a colourful plumage, then this trait will increase in frequency over time as male peacocks with a colourful plumage will have more reproductive success. Further investigation of this concept, has found that it is in fact the specific trait of blue and green colour near the eyespot that seems to increase the females likelihood of mating with a specific peacock.

Mate choice is a major component of sexual selection, another being intrasexual selection. Ideas on sexual selection were first introduced in 1871, by Charles Darwin, then expanded on by Ronald Fisher in 1915. At present, there are five sub mechanisms that explain how mate choice has evolved over time. These are direct phenotypic benefits, sensory bias, the Fisherian runaway hypothesis, indicator traits and genetic compatibility.

In the majority of systems where mate choice exists, one sex tends to be competitive with their same-sex members and the other sex is choosy (meaning they are selective when it comes to picking individuals to mate with). There are direct and indirect benefits of being the selective individual. In most species, females are the choosy sex which discriminates among competitive males, but there are several examples of reversed roles (see below). It is preferable for an individual to choose a compatible mate of the same species, in order to maintain reproductive success. Other factors that can influence mate choice include pathogen stress and the major histocompatibility complex (MHC).

== Origins and history ==
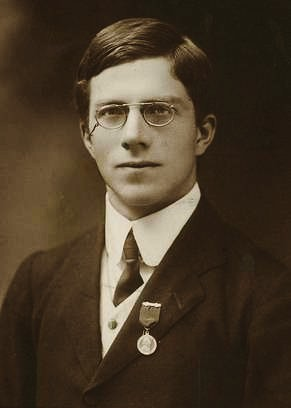
Ronald Fisher in 1913

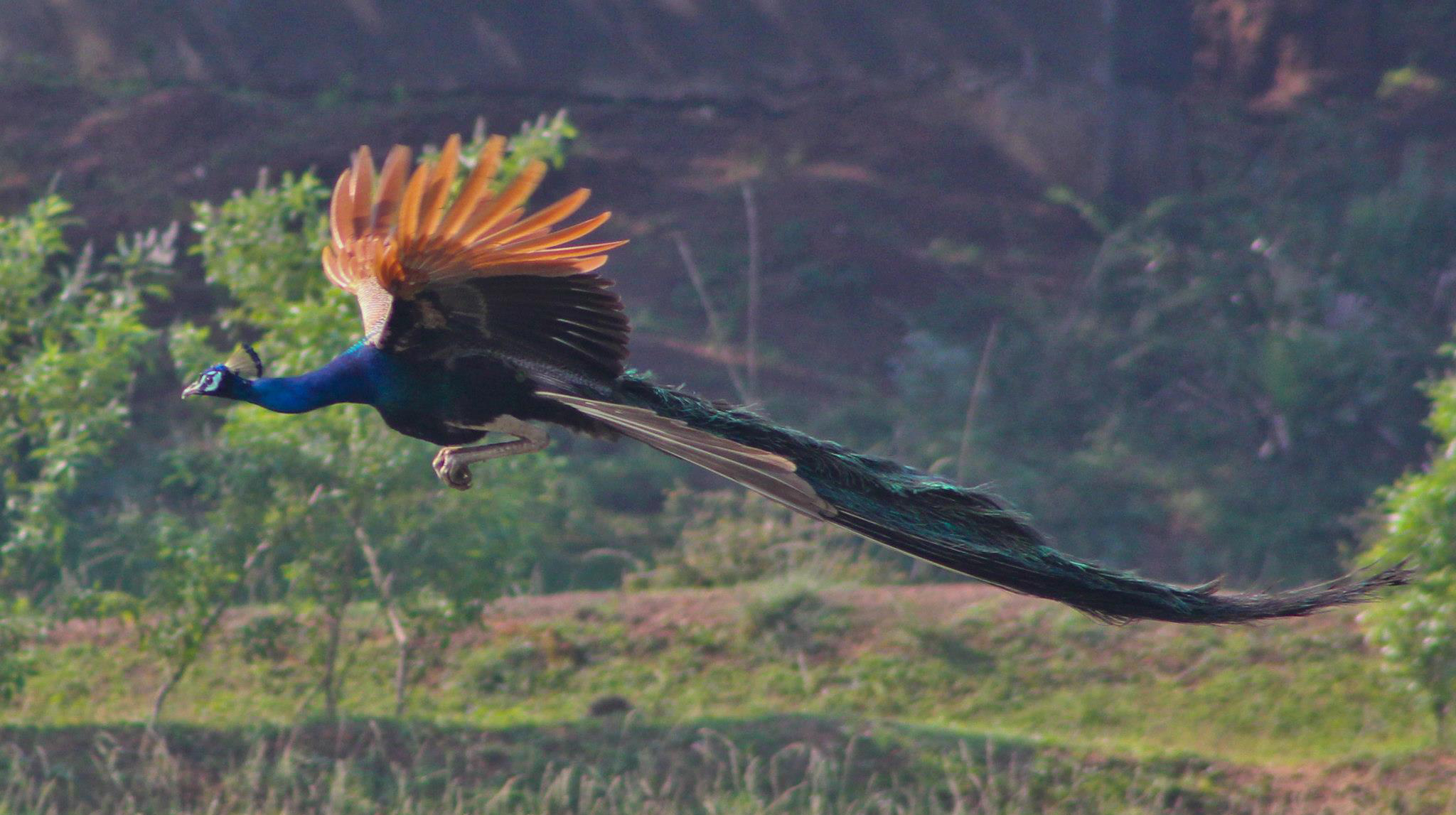
The peacock tail in flight, the classic example of a Fisherian runaway

Charles Darwin first expressed his ideas on sexual selection and mate choice in his book The Descent of Man, and Selection in Relation to Sex in 1871. He was perplexed by the elaborate ornamentation that males of some species have, because such features appeared to be detrimental to survival and to have negative consequences for reproductive success. Darwin proposed two explanations for the existence of such traits: these traits are useful in male-male combat or they are preferred by females. This article focuses on the latter. Darwin treated natural selection and sexual selection as two different topics, although in the 1930s biologists defined sexual selection as being a part of natural selection.

In 1915, Ronald Fisher wrote a paper on the evolution of female preference and secondary sexual characteristics. Fifteen years later, he expanded this theory in a book called The Genetical Theory of Natural Selection. There he described a scenario, Fisherian runaway, where feedback between mate preference and a trait results in elaborate characters such as the long tail of the male peacock.

In 1948, using Drosophila as a model, Angus John Bateman presented experimental evidence that male reproductive success is limited by the number of mates obtained, while female reproductive success is limited by the number of pregnancies that she can have in her lifetime. Thus a female must be selective when choosing a mate because the quality of her offspring depends on it. Males must fight, in the form of intra-sexual competition, for the opportunity to mate because not all males will be chosen by females. This became known as Bateman's principle, and although this was a major finding that added to the work of Darwin and Fisher, it was overlooked until George C. Williams emphasised its importance in the 1960s and 1970s.

In 1972, soon after Williams' revival of the subject, Robert L. Trivers presented his parental investment theory. Trivers defined parental investment as any investment made by the parent that benefits his or her current offspring at the cost of investment in future offspring. These investments include the costs of producing gametes as well as any other care or efforts that parents provide after birth or hatching. Reformulating Bateman's ideas, Trivers argued that the sex which exhibits less parental investment (not necessarily the male) will have to compete for mating opportunities with the sex that invests more. The differences in levels of parental investment create the condition that favours mating biases.

== Direct and indirect benefits ==
The act of being choosy was likely selected for as a way to assess whether or not a potential partner's contribution(s) would be capable of producing and/or maintaining the viability of an offspring. Utilizing these behaviors usually results in two types of benefits to the individual who is being choosy:

- Direct benefits increase the fitness of the choosy sex through direct material advantages or resources. These benefits include but are not limited to increased territory quality, increased parental care, and protection from predators. There is much support for maintenance of mate choice by direct benefits and this approach offers the least controversial model to explain discriminate mating.
- Indirect benefits increase genetic fitness for the offspring, and thereby increase the parents' inclusive fitness. When it appears that the choosy sex does not receive direct benefits from his or her mate, indirect benefits may be the payoff for being selective. These indirect benefits may include high-quality genes for their offspring (known as adaptive indirect benefits) or genes that make their offspring more attractive (known as arbitrary indirect benefits).

=== Inbreeding avoidance ===
Usually, animal biologists assume that mate choice is biased against relatives because of the negative consequences of inbreeding. However certain natural constraints act to limit the evolution of inbreeding avoidance, particularly when there is a risk of mating with a partner of a different species (heterospecific mating) and losing fitness through hybridization. Inclusive fitness appears to be maximized in matings of intermediately related individuals.

== Mechanisms ==
As of 2018, five proposed mechanisms address the evolution of mate choice:

- Direct phenotypic benefits
- Sensory bias
- Fisherian runaway
- Indicator traits
- Genetic compatibility

Direct and/or indirect benefits drive the mating biases described in each mechanism. It is possible that these mechanisms co-occur, although the relative roles of each have not been evaluated adequately.

=== Direct phenotypic benefits ===
A choosy mate tends to have preferences for certain types of traits—also known as phenotypes—which would benefit them to have in a potential partner. These traits must be reliable, and communicative of something that directly benefits the choosy partner in some way. Having a mating preference is advantageous in this situation because it directly affects reproductive fitness. Direct benefits are widespread and empirical studies provide evidence for this mechanism of evolution.

One example of a sexually selected trait with direct benefits is the bright plumage of the northern cardinal, a common backyard bird in the eastern United States. Male northern cardinals have conspicuous red feathers, while the females have a more cryptic coloration. In this example, the females are the choosy sex and will use male plumage brightness as a signal when picking a mate — research suggests that males with brighter plumage feed their young more frequently than males with duller plumage. This increased help in caring for the young lifts some of the burden from the mother so that she can raise more offspring than she could without help.

Though this particular mechanism operates on the premise that all phenotypes must communicate something that benefits the choosy mate directly, such selected phenotypes can also have additional indirect benefits for the mother by benefiting the offspring. For example, with the increased help in feeding their young seen in Northern Cardinals with more plumage-brightness, comes an increase in the overall amount of food that is likely to be given to the offspring - even if the mother has more children. Though females may choose this trait with the presumed directly advantageous aim of allowing them more time and energy to allocate to producing more offspring, it also benefits the offspring in that two parents provide food instead of one, thereby increasing the likelihood of the overall amount of food available to the offspring despite a possible increase in the amount of offspring siblings.

=== Sensory bias ===
The sensory-bias hypothesis states that the preference for a trait evolves in a non-mating context and is then exploited by the less choosy sex in order to obtain more mating opportunities. The competitive sex evolves traits that exploit a pre-existing bias that the choosy sex already possesses. Following this hypothesis, increased selectivity for one of these specific traits can explain remarkable trait differences in closely related species because it produces a divergence in signaling systems which leads to reproductive isolation.

Sensory bias has been demonstrated in guppies, freshwater fish from Trinidad and Tobago. In this mating system, female guppies prefer to mate with males with more orange body-coloration. However, outside of a mating context, both sexes prefer animate orange objects, which suggests that preference originally evolved in another context, like foraging. Orange fruits are a rare treat that fall into streams where the guppies live. The ability to find these fruits quickly is an adaptive quality that has evolved outside of a mating context. Sometime after the affinity for orange objects arose, male guppies exploited this preference by incorporating large orange spots to attract females.

Another example of sensory exploitation is the case of the water mite Neumania papillator, an ambush predator which hunts copepods (small crustaceans) passing by in the water column. When hunting, N. papillator adopts a characteristic stance termed the "net stance": it holds its first four legs out into the water column, with its four hind legs resting on aquatic vegetation; this allows it to detect vibrational stimuli produced by swimming prey and to use this to orient towards and clutch at prey. During courtship, males actively search for females; if a male finds a female, he slowly circles around the female whilst trembling his first and second leg near her. Male leg-trembling causes females (who were in the "net stance") to orient towards and often to clutch the male. This does not damage the male or deter further courtship; the male then deposits spermatophores and begins to vigorously fan and jerk his fourth pair of legs over the spermatophore, generating a current of water that passes over the spermatophores and towards the female. Sperm-packet uptake by the female would sometimes follow. Heather Proctor hypothesised that the vibrations made by trembling male legs mimic the vibrations that females detect from swimming prey. This would trigger the female prey-detection responses, causing females to orient and then clutch at males, mediating courtship. If this was true and males were exploiting female predation responses, then hungry females should be more receptive to male trembling. Proctor found that unfed captive females did orient and clutch at males significantly more than fed captive females did, consistent with the sensory exploitation hypothesis.

Other examples of the sensory-bias mechanism include traits in auklets, wolf spiders, and manakins. Further experimental work is required to reach a fuller understanding of the prevalence and mechanisms of sensory bias.

=== Fisherian runaway and sexy-son hypothesis ===
This creates a positive feedback loop in which a particular trait is desired by a female and present in a male, and that desire for and presence of that particular trait are then reflected in their offspring. If this mechanism is strong enough, it can lead to a type of self-reinforcing coevolution. If runaway selection is strong enough, it may incur significant costs, such as increased visibility to predators and energetic costs to maintain the trait's full expression; hence peacocks' extravagant feathers, or any number of lek mating displays. This model does not predict a genetic benefit; rather, the reward is more mates.

In a study done on great reed warblers, models based on the polygyny threshold and sexy-son hypotheses predict that females should gain evolutionary advantage in either short-term or long-term in this mating system. Although the importance of female choice was demonstrated, the study did not support the hypotheses. Other studies, such as those conducted on long-tailed widowbirds, have demonstrated the existence of female choice. Here, females chose males with long tails, and even preferred those males with experimentally lengthened tails over shortened tails and those of naturally occurring length. Such a process shows how female choice could give rise to exaggerated sexual traits through Fisherian runaway selection.

=== Indicator traits ===
Indicator traits signal good overall quality of the individual. Traits perceived as attractive must reliably indicate broad genetic quality in order for selection to favor them and for preference to evolve. This is an example of indirect genetic benefits received by the choosy sex, because mating with such individuals will result in high-quality offspring. The indicator traits hypothesis is split into three highly related subtopics: the handicap theory of sexual selection, the good genes hypothesis, and the Hamilton–Zuk hypothesis.

People rate the importance of certain traits differently when referring to their own or to others' ideal long-term partners. Research suggests that women consider traits indicating genetic fitness as more important for their own partner, while prioritising traits that provide benefits to others for their sister's ideal partner.

Indicator traits are condition-dependent and have associated costs. Therefore, individuals which can handle these costs well (cf. "I can do X [here, survive] with one hand tied behind my back") should be desired by the choosy sex for their superior genetic quality. This is known as the handicap theory of sexual selection.

The good genes hypothesis states that the choosy sex will mate with individuals who possess traits that signify overall genetic quality. In doing so, they gain an evolutionary advantage for their offspring through indirect benefit.

The Hamilton–Zuk hypothesis posits that sexual ornaments are indicators of parasite- and disease-resistance. To test this hypothesis, red jungle-fowl males were infected with a parasitic roundworm and monitored for growth and developmental changes. Female preference was also evaluated. The researchers found that parasites affected the development and final appearance of ornamental traits and that females preferred males who were not infected. This supports the idea that parasites are an important factor in sexual selection and mate choice.

One of many examples of indicator traits is the condition-dependent patch of red feathers around the face and shoulders of the male house finch. This patch varies in brightness among individuals because the pigments that produce the red color (carotenoids) are limited in the environment. Thus, males who have a high-quality diet will have brighter red plumage. In a much-cited manipulation experiment, female house finches were shown to prefer males with brighter red patches. Also, males with naturally brighter patches proved better fathers and exhibited higher offspring-feeding rates than duller males.

=== Genetic compatibility ===
Genetic compatibility refers to how well the genes of two parents function together in their offspring. Choosing genetically compatible mates could result in optimally fit offspring and notably affect reproductive fitness. However, the genetic compatibility model is limited to specific traits due to complex genetic interactions (e.g. major histocompatibility complex in humans and mice). The choosy sex must know their own genotype as well as the genotypes of potential mates in order to select the appropriate partner. This makes testing components of genetic compatibility difficult and controversial.

==== Role of major histocompatibility complex ====
A controversial but well-known experiment suggests that human females use body odor as an indicator of genetic compatibility. In this study, males were given a plain T-shirt to sleep in for two nights in order to provide a scent sample. College women were then asked to rate odors from several men, some with similar MHC (major histocompatibility complex) genes to their own and others with dissimilar genes. MHC genes code for receptors that identify foreign pathogens in the body so that the immune system may respond and destroy them. Since each different gene in the MHC codes for a different type of receptor, it is expected that females will benefit from mating with males who have more dissimilar MHC genes. This will ensure better resistance to parasites and disease in offspring. Researchers found that women tended to rate the odors higher if the male's genes were more dissimilar to their own. They concluded that the odors are influenced by the MHC and that they have consequences for mate choice in human populations today.

Similar to the humans of the odor-rating experiment, animals also choose mates based upon genetic compatibility as determined by evaluating the body odor of their potential mate(s). Some animals, such as mice, assess a mate's genetic compatibility based on their urine odor.

In an experiment studying three-spined sticklebacks, researchers found that females prefer to mate with males that share a greater diversity of major histocompatibility complex (MHC) and in addition possess a MHC haplotype specific to fighting the common parasite Gyrodactylus salaris. Mates that have MHC genes different from one another will be superior when reproducing with regard to parasite resistance, body condition and reproductive success and survival.

The genetic diversity of animals and life reproductive success (LRS) at the MHC level is optimal at intermediate levels rather than at its maximum, despite MHC being one of the most polymorphic genes. In a study, researchers discovered that mice heterozygous at all MHC loci were less resistant than mice homozygous at all loci to salmonella, so it appears disadvantageous to display many different MHC alleles due to the increased loss of T-cells, which aid an organism's immune system and trigger its appropriate response.

MHC diversity may also correlate with MHC gene expression. As long as a heritable component exists in expression patterns, natural selection is able to act upon the trait. Therefore, gene expression for MHC genes might contribute to the natural selection processes of certain species and be in fact evolutionarily relevant. For example, in another study of three-spined sticklebacks, exposure to parasite species increased MHC class IIB expression by over 25%, proving that parasitic infection increases gene expression.

MHC diversity in vertebrates may also be generated by the recombination of alleles on the MHC gene.

== Sex role reversal in animals ==
In species where mating biases exist, females are typically the choosy sex because they provide a greater parental investment than males. However, there are some examples of sex role reversals where females must compete with each other for mating opportunities with males. Species that exhibit parental care after the birth of their offspring have the potential to overcome the sex differences in parental investment (the amount of energy that each parent contributes per offspring) and lead to a reversal in sex roles. In some species, sex role reversal is combined with reversed sexual dimorphism, a condition where females of a species are larger or more ornamented than the males. The following are examples of male mate choice (sex role reversal) across several taxa.

- Fish: Some male fish display high levels of parental care (see pipefish, scissortail sergeant, and seahorses). This is because females will deposit their eggs in a special brooding pouch that the male possesses. She does not participate in parental care after this event. The male then has the burden of raising the offspring on his own which requires energy and time. Thus, males in these species must choose among competitive females for mating opportunities. Surveys across multiple species of pipefish suggest that the sex differences in the level of parental care may not be the only reason for the reversal. Mating systems (e. i. monogamy and polygamy) might also heavily influence the appearance of male mate choice.
- Amphibian: Male poison-arrow frogs (Dendrobates auratus) take on a very active parenting role. Females are lured by the males to rearing sites where they deposit their eggs. The male fertilises these eggs and accepts the burden of defending and caring for the young until they are independent. Because the male contributes a higher level of parental investment, females must compete for opportunities to leave their eggs with the limited available males.
- Bird: Bird species are typically biparental in care, and may also be maternal like the Guianan cock-of-the-rocks. However the reverse may also hold true. Male wattled jacanas provide all parental care after the eggs have been laid by the females. This means that the males must incubate the eggs and defend the nest for an extended period of time. Since males invest much more time and energy into the offspring, females are very competitive for the right to lay their eggs in an established nest.
- Mammal: There are no confirmed cases of sex role reversed mammals but female spotted hyenas have peculiar anatomy and behaviour that has warranted much attention. Female spotted hyenas are much more aggressive than males due to their high levels of androgens during development. The increased male hormones during development contribute to an enlarged pseudopenis that is involved in mating and birth. Although the anatomical and behavioural roles differ from accepted norms, spotted hyenas are not sex role reversed because the females do not compete with each other for mates.

== Speciation ==
For many years it has been suggested that sexual isolation caused by differences in mating behaviours is a precursor for reproductive isolation (lack of gene flow), and consequently speciation, in nature. Mate choice behaviours are thought to be important forces that can result in speciation events because the strength of selection for attractive traits is often very strong. Speciation by this method occurs when a preference for some sexual trait shifts and produces a pre-zygotic barrier (preventing fertilisation). These processes have been difficult to test until recently with advances in genetic modelling. Speciation by sexual selection is gaining popularity in the literature with increasing theoretical and empirical studies.

There is evidence of early speciation through mate preference in guppies. Guppies are located across several isolated streams in Trinidad and male colour patterns differ geographically. Female guppies have no coloration but their preference for these colour patterns also vary across locations. In a mate choice study, female guppies were shown to prefer males with colour patterns that are typical of their home stream. This preference could result in reproductive isolation if two populations came into contact again. There is a similar trend shown in two species of the wood white butterfly, L. reali and L. sinapis. Female L. sinapis controls mate choice by engaging only in conspecific mating, while males attempt to mate with either species. This female mate choice has encouraged speciation of the two wood whites.

The black-throated blue warbler, a North American bird, is another example. Asymmetric recognition of local and non-local songs has been found between two populations of black-throated blue warblers in the United States, one in the northern United States (New Hampshire) and the other in the southern United States (North Carolina). Males in the northern population respond strongly to the local male songs but relatively weakly to the non-local songs of southern males. In contrast, southern males respond equally to both local and non-local songs. The fact that northern males exhibit differential recognition indicates that northern females tend not to mate with "heterospecific" males from the south; thus it is not necessary for the northern males to respond strongly to the song from a southern challenger. A barrier to gene flow exists from South to North as a result of the female choice, which can eventually lead to speciation.

== Mate choice in humans ==
In humans, males and females differ in their strategies to acquire mates. Females exhibit more mate choice selectivity than males. According to Bateman's principle, human females display less variance in their Lifespan Reproductive Success, due to their high obligatory parental investment. Human female sexual selection is indicated by sexual dimorphism, especially in traits that serve little other evolutionary purpose, such as the presence in men of beards, overall lower voice pitch, and average greater height. Women have reported a preference for men with beards and lower voices. The traits most salient to female human mate choice are parental investment, resource provision and the provision of good genes to offspring. Women as well as men may seek short-term mating partners. This could gain them resources; provide genetic benefit, as through the sexy son hypothesis; facilitate a desired break-up; and allow them to assess a mate's suitability as a long-term partner. Women prefer long-term partners over short-term mates, as they have a larger investment in a child through pregnancy and lactation. Factors in female mate choice include the woman's own perceived attractiveness, the woman's personal resources, mate copying and parasite stress. Romantic love is the mechanism through which long-term mate choice occurs in human females.

In humans, females have to endure a nine-month pregnancy and childbirth. Females thus provide a greater biologically obligatory parental investment to offspring than males. This provides males with a greater window of opportunity to mate and reproduce than females, hence females are usually more choosy, but males still make mate choices. When finding a short-term mate, males highly value women with sexual experience and physical attractiveness. Men seeking short-term sexual relationships are likely to avoid women who are interested in commitment or require investment. For a long-term relationship, males may look for commitment, facial symmetry, femininity, physical beauty, waist–hip ratio, large breasts, and youth. Due to the higher obligatory biological investment, women are choosier in short-term mating, as the perceived paternal investment is low to non existent, whereas men and women are equally choosy when deciding for long-term mates, as men and women then have an equal parental investment, as men then invest heavily in the offspring by resource provisioning.

The parasite-stress theory suggests that parasites or diseases stress an organism, making them look less sexually attractive. Choosing a mate for attractiveness could thus help to find a healthy mate resistant to parasites.

Scarification could be viewed by prospective mates as evidence that a person has overcome parasites and is thus more attractive. Masculinity, especially in the face, could equally indicate robust parasite-free health. Polygamy is predicted by pathogen stress in the tropics.

Human leukocyte antigen (HLA) proteins are essential for immune system functioning and are highly variable, assumed to be a result of frequency-dependent parasite-driven selection and mate choice. There is some evidence that women detect and select HLA type by odour, though this is disputed. Human facial preferences correlate with both MHC-similarity and MHC-heterozygosity.

== Mate choice for cognitive traits ==
In the late 19th century, Charles Darwin proposed that cognition, or "intelligence," was the product of two combined evolutionary forces: natural selection and sexual selection. Research on human mate choice showed that intelligence is sexually selected for, and is highly esteemed by both sexes. Some evolutionary psychologists have suggested that humans evolved large brains because the cognitive abilities associated with this size increase were successful in attracting mates, consequently increasing reproductive success: brains are metabolically costly to produce and are an honest signal of mate quality. Cognition may be functioning to attract mates in other taxa. If the possession of higher cognitive skills enhances a male's ability to gather resources, then females may benefit directly from choosing more intelligent males, through courtship feeding or allofeeding. Assuming cognitive skills are heritable to some degree, females may also benefit indirectly through their offspring. Additionally, cognitive ability has been shown to vary significantly, both within and between species, and could be under sexual selection as a result. Recently, researchers have started to ask to what extent individuals assess the cognitive abilities of the opposite sex when choosing a mate. In fruit flies, the absence of sexual selection was accompanied by a decline in male cognitive performance.

=== In non-human vertebrates ===
Female preference for males with enhanced cognitive ability "may be reflected in successful males' courtship displays, foraging performance, courtship feeding or diet-dependent morphological traits." However, few are the studies that assess whether females can discriminate between males through direct observation of cognitively demanding tasks. Instead, researchers generally investigate female choice by reason of morphological traits correlated with cognitive ability.

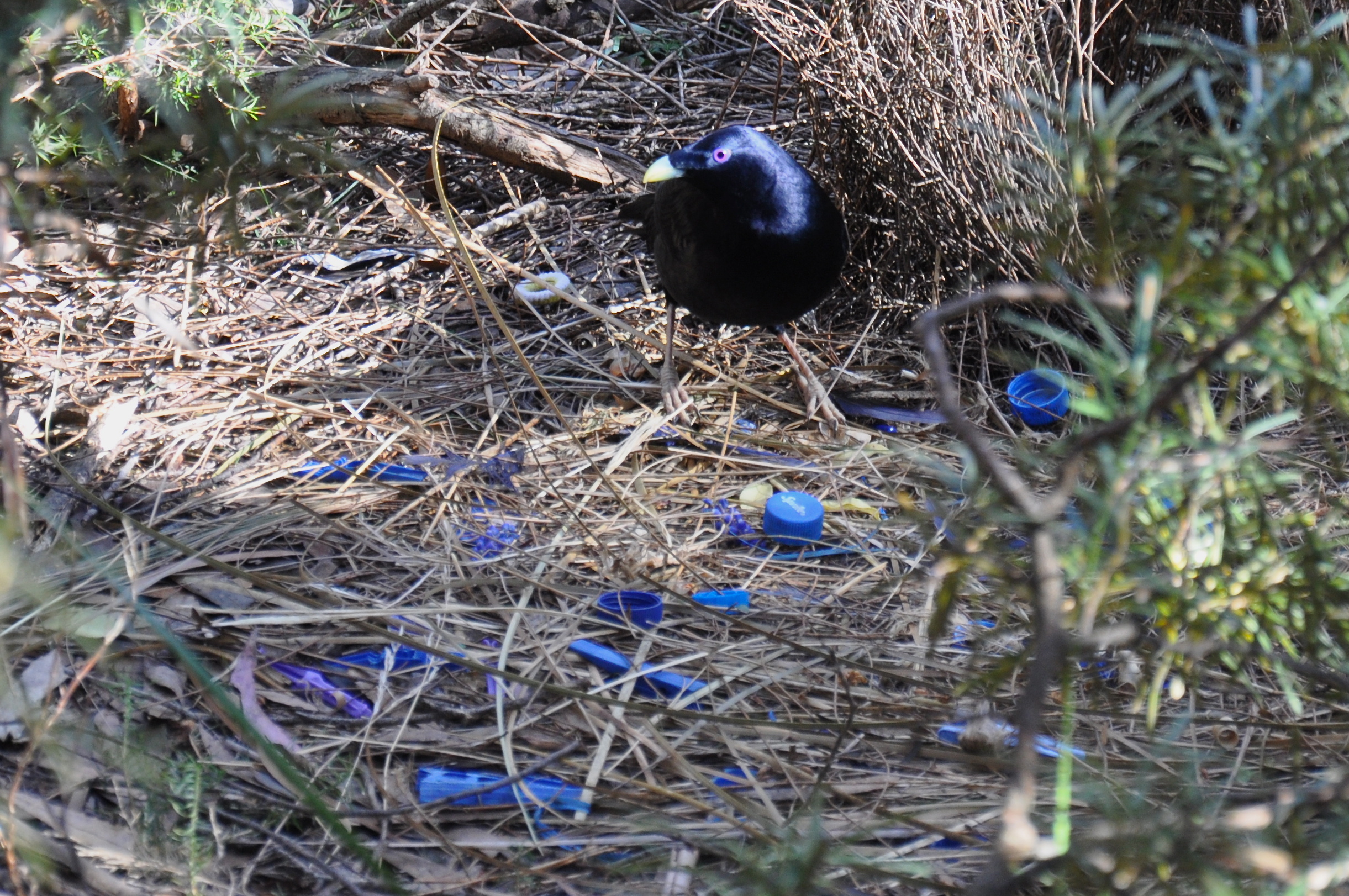
A male satin bowerbird guards its bower from rival males in the hopes of attracting females with its decorations.

==== Birds ====
- Budgerigars: in this parrot species, direct observation of problem-solving skills was shown to increase male attractiveness. In a two-step experiment testing for female preference, initially less-preferred male budgerigars became preferred after females observed them solve extractive foraging problems while initially preferred males failed to problem-solve. This shift in preference suggests that females discriminate between males through direct observation of cognitively-demanding tasks.
- Zebra finches: researchers conducted a problem-solving experiment similar to the one described above. However, male problem-solving performance was not found to influence female mating preferences. Instead, females had a significant preference for males with better foraging efficiency. There is no evidence that females indirectly assess male cognitive ability through morphological traits. By selecting for males with a higher foraging efficiency, females obtained direct food benefits.
- Satin Bowerbirds: bowerbirds are famous because of their complex male courtship, in which they utilize decorations of certain colours. This suggests that male bowerbirds with enhanced cognitive abilities should have a selective advantage during male courtship. In a study testing problem-solving skills, male satin bowerbirds' general cognitive performance was found to correlate to mating success, rendering them more sexually attractive. However, a more recent study evaluated bowerbirds on six cognitive tasks, and found very little intercorrelation between them. In a more recent study, bowerbird performance in six cognitive tasks was positively correlated with mating success, but no general cognitive ability was found as intercorrelations between performances on each task were weak. Instead, mating success could be independently predicted via the male's performance on most tasks; this demonstrates the complexity of the link between cognitive ability and sexual selection.
- Red Crossbills: an experimental study showed that female red crossbills prefer males with higher foraging efficiency. After observing two males simultaneously extracting seeds from cones, females spent more time in proximity of the faster foragers. Although females could benefit both directly and indirectly through their preference for faster foragers, the potential link between foraging efficiency and cognitive abilities was not investigated.
- Mountain chickadees: in this monogamous bird species, spatial cognition is important as mountain chickadees rely on the retrieval of previously stored food caches to nourish themselves during the winter. Spatial memory has been shown to correlate with reproductive success in mountain chickadees. When females mate with males possessing enhanced spatial cognition, they laid larger clutches and fledged larger broods when compared to females mating with males possessing worse spatial cognition. Therefore, when mating with high quality males with enhanced spatial skills, females may attempt to gain indirect, genetic benefits by increasing their reproductive investment.

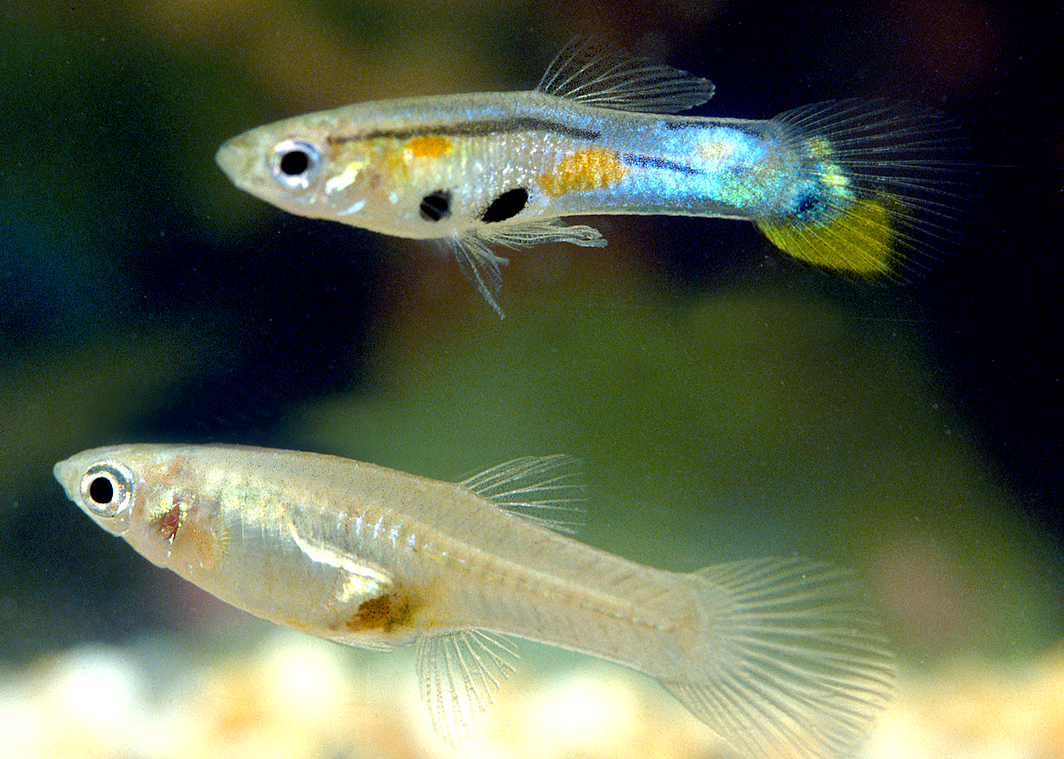
The Trinidadian guppy (Poecilia reticulata), male (above), and female (below)

==== Other ====
- Guppies: when assessing male cognitive ability via maze experiments, females preferred males that learnt two mazes at a faster rate. However, females did not directly observe males during their learning tasks. Although females could be discriminating between males by assessing orange saturation - a morphological trait weakly correlated to learning rate - females did not find males with brighter orange spots more attractive. Instead, females may use an unknown visual trait to discriminate between males and their cognitive abilities.
- Meadow Voles: in this species of rodents, female preference for male spatial ability was investigated. Male spatial ability was measured using a series of water maze tests, before females were given a choice between two males. Although females did not directly observe males complete spatial-ability tasks, they preferred males with enhanced spatial skills. This preference could explain why meadow vole brain regions associated with spatial ability are sexually dimorphic: spatial ability could serve as an honest signal of male quality due to the metabolic costs associated with brain development.

==== Criticisms ====
Although there is some evidence that females assess male cognitive ability when choosing a mate, the effect that cognitive ability has on survival and mating preference remain unclear. Many questions need to be answered to be able to better appreciate the implications that cognitive traits may have in mate choice. Some discrepancies also need to be resolved. For example, in 1996, Catchpole suggested that in songbirds, females preferred males with larger song repertoires. Learned song repertoire was correlated with the size of the High Vocal Center (HVC) in the brain; females may then use song repertoire as an indicator of general cognitive ability. However, a more recent study found learned song repertoire to be an unreliable signal of cognitive ability. Rather than a general cognitive ability, male songbirds were found to have specific cognitive abilities that did not positively associate.

As of 2011, more research was needed on what extent cognitive abilities determine foraging success or courtship displays, what extent behavioural courtship displays rely on learning through practice and experience, what extent cognitive abilities affect survival and mating success, and what indicator traits could be used as a signal of cognitive ability. Researchers have started to explore links between cognition and personality; some personality traits such as boldness or neophobia may be used as indicators of cognitive ability, although more evidence is required to characterize personality-cognition relationships. As of 2011, empirical evidence for the benefits, both direct and indirect, of choosing mates with enhanced cognition is weak. One possible research direction would be on the indirect benefits of mating with males with enhanced spatial cognition in mountain chickadees. Additional focus in research is needed on developmental and environmental effects on cognitive ability, as such factors have been shown to influence song learning and could therefore influence other cognitive traits.

== See also ==
- Extended female sexuality
- Filter theory (sociology)
- Human male sexuality
- Human female sexuality
- Mate guarding in humans
- Parental investment
- Psychological adaptation
- Seduction
- Sexual conflict
- Sexual selection
