= Hygrobates =

Scientific classification
- Kingdom: Animalia
- Phylum: Arthropoda
- Subphylum: Chelicerata
- Class: Arachnida
- Order: Trombidiformes
- Family: Hygrobatidae
- Genus: Hygrobates; Koch, 1837

Genus of spiders

Hygrobates is a genus of mites belonging to the family Hygrobatidae.

The genus has cosmopolitan distribution.

== Systematics ==
- Hygrobates americanus Habeeb, 1955
- Hygrobates ampliatus Viets, 1936
- Hygrobates apertus Viets, 1936
- Hygrobates australicus Cook, 1986
- Hygrobates baderi Viets, 1955
- Hygrobates bucharicus Sokolow, 1928
- Hygrobates calabricus Pešić & Goldschmidt, 2022
- Hygrobates calliger Piersig, 1896
- Hygrobates chutteri Viets, 1963
- Hygrobates conicus Kirchner, 1864
- Hygrobates conspiciendus Biesiadka & Kowalik, 1978
- Hygrobates crassipes Lundblad, 1937
- Hygrobates dadayi Cook, 1967
- Hygrobates damasi Lundblad, 1949
- Hygrobates diversiporus Sokolow, 1927
- Hygrobates elgonensis Lundblad, 1927
- Hygrobates exilis Koenike, 1895
- Hygrobates extensus Viets, 1924
- Hygrobates fluviatilis (Ström, 1768)
- Hygrobates foreli (Lebert, 1874)
- Hygrobates gracilidens Lundblad, 1936
- Hygrobates hamatus Viets, 1935
- Hygrobates inguinalis Kirchner, 1864
- Hygrobates japonicus Uchida, 1931
- Hygrobates kirgizicus Sokolow, 1935
- Hygrobates lacrima Pešić, 2020
- Hygrobates liberiensis Cook, 1966
- Hygrobates longipalpis (Hermann, 1804)
- Hygrobates longipes Viets, 1937
- Hygrobates longiporus Thor, 1898
- Hygrobates loveni Lundblad, 1927
- Hygrobates micronesiensis Cook & Bright, 1983
- Hygrobates minutus Imamura, 1953
- Hygrobates multiporus Koenike, 1895
- Hygrobates nigromaculatus Lebert, 1879
- Hygrobates niloticus Walter, 1922
- Hygrobates norvegicus (Thor, 1897)
- Hygrobates orientalis Lundblad, 1969
- Hygrobates pacificus Cook & Bright, 1983
- Hygrobates palauensis Cook & Bright, 1983
- Hygrobates papillosus Imamura, 1953
- Hygrobates paucidentis Walter, 1926
- Hygrobates plebejus Lundblad, 1930
- Hygrobates plicatus Lundblad, 1942
- Hygrobates polyporus Piersig, 1898
- Hygrobates ponticus Pešić, Esen & Mumladze, 2022
- Hygrobates porrectus Koenike, 1908
- Hygrobates properus Láska, 1954
- Hygrobates rufus (Lundblad, 1937)
- Hygrobates salamandrarum Goldschmidt, Gerecke & Alberti, 2002
- Hygrobates sanguineus Viets, 1956
- Hygrobates sarsi (Thor, 1898)
- Hygrobates schlienzi K. O. Viets, 1956
- Hygrobates sigthori Viets, 1914
- Hygrobates sinensis Uchida & Imamura, 1951
- Hygrobates soari Viets, 1911
- Hygrobates sokolowi Thor, 1927
- Hygrobates topatopa Habeeb, 1975
- Hygrobates triangularis Lundblad, 1937
- Hygrobates trigonicus Koenike, 1895
- Hygrobates tuberculatus Viets, 1935
