= Filter theory (sociology) =

Filter theory is a sociological theory concerning dating and mate selection. It proposes that social structure limits the number of eligible candidates for a mate. Most often, this takes place due to homogamy, as people seek to date and marry only those similar to them (characteristics that are often taken into account are age, race, social status and religion). Homogamy is the idea of marriage between spouses who share similar characteristics, where heterogamy denotes marriage between spouses of different characteristics. The idea of "opposites attract” is heterogamous, as well as the idea that one spouse has complementing, not similar characteristics to the other.

Helpful terms in defining filter theory are "endogamy", which indicates that both partners come from the same group (ethnicity, religion, culture, age similarity, lifestyle, etc.) and may also carry cultural sanctions against marrying outside of one's own group, and "exogamy", which indicates marrying out of one's own social group. Examples of exogamy include marrying outside of one's own race or religion.

== Psychology perspective ==
Psychologists Louis Janda and Karen Klende-Hamel developed a filtering model to describe the process by which individuals narrow down the total population to a single mate. The model begins with the broadest possible group all people and progressively eliminates those who are unavailable or incompatible. First, married couples and others already in committed relationships are removed, leaving only those who are eligible to enter a new relationship.

From this eligible pool, a compatibility filter is applied, eliminating individuals who are not mutually attracted to each other. A physical attractiveness filter follows, reflecting the tendency for people to be drawn to those who look similar to themselves. This inclination has been linked to the inherited instinct to survive and reproduce within one's environment. However, the significance of physical homogamy in marital relationships has been observed to be decreasing, in part due to the rise of interracial marriage.

A further filter concerns values and worldview: people tend to gravitate toward partners who think similarly to themselves and away from those with conflicting ideas. After all these filters have been applied, a potential field of partners remains. Proximity then plays a practical role people generally choose partners who are nearby. That said, growing communications technology and the widespread availability of online dating have expanded what "nearby" means, enabling individuals to connect without face-to-face interaction and broadening the total field of potential partners.

== Sociological perspective ==
Although different cultures prioritize different qualities in a prospective partner, these qualities consistently fall into the same broad categories. Love-marriage selection criteria, for instance, tend to reflect individuals' personal concerns such as the personal and interpersonal qualities of the prospective mate and issues of compatibility while arranged-marriage selection criteria reflect concerns of the broader family unit, including socioeconomic status, health, fertility, temperament, and emotional stability of the prospective spouse (Blood 1972). Despite these differences in approach, the degree of similarity between partners remains consistent across both types of marriage.

People are also drawn to partners with similar lifestyles and standards of living, as shared circumstances increase the likelihood of common personal tastes, opinions, and values, making it easier to establish close relations. These affinities are often shaped and reinforced through social networks. Contrary to popular belief, sharing a profession is not the strongest predictor of compatibility; educational homophily is a stronger indicator, as it reflects deeper cultural similarities that outweigh occupational stratification. Working in proximity to someone in a similar field does not necessarily produce a stronger bond than sharing an educational background.

This is partly because education tends to sort individuals into smaller peer groups defined by shared economic status, subject of study, or background, enabling homogamy within those subgroups. Such groupings illustrate more broadly how people meet through social networks and how structural similarity shapes mate selection.

== Theory of complementary needs ==
Sociologist Robert F. Winch conducted a study of twenty-five couples in order to test the ways in which complementarity functions in mate selection. The theory is both psychological and sociological, drawing from the Freudian tradition while also addressing the formation of a social group — specifically, the marital dyad. It holds that individuals choose partners whose needs are complementary to their own. Winch observed that in the United States, a couple is typically formed through meeting and becoming acquainted, then falling in love before deciding to marry. He therefore proposed that, since meeting is a precondition for falling in love, it is worth examining whom one is likely to meet. He noted that if one frequents certain places, one will most likely encounter people accustomed to the same level of consumption, cherishing similar values, and harboring similar aversions and prejudices. An atheist, for instance, is unlikely to regularly encounter a devoted churchgoer, just as someone who frequents bars is unlikely to meet a recovering alcoholic in that setting. As social psychologist Andrea B. Hollingshead observed, next to race, religion is the most decisive factor in segregating males and females into categories that are approved or disapproved with respect to marriage.

Winch found that people tend to associate with and marry those similar to themselves, and that it is widely considered desirable to marry "among one's own" in regard to race, religion, and similar characteristics. He identified a set of variables along which homogamy has been shown to operate: race, religion, social class, broad occupational grouping, location of residence, income, age, level of education, intelligence, and others. These variables shape the social environments one inhabits and thereby define a "field of eligible spouse-candidates." These candidates are not necessarily people one has sought out deliberately, but rather individuals encountered routinely the person sitting nearby in church each week, or a regular presence at the gym whose proximity in everyday life makes them plausible partners.

== Considerations ==
While mate selection has been found to be mostly homogamous with regard to social characteristics such as religion, the psychodynamics of couples have not followed the same pattern. According to Sigmund Freud, self-loving individuals tended to mate with those who were emotionally dependent, and one may also fall in love with a person because they represent a perfection the other has unsuccessfully striven to attain. This relates to Winch's Theory of Complementary Needs, which holds that people seek qualities in a partner that complement their own.

According to the similarity principle, the more two people perceive themselves to be similar, the more likely their relationship is to grow and succeed. The word "perceive" carries particular weight here: a person may believe they share more in common with a partner than they actually do, and may also be inclined to overlook genuine differences when certain similarities are weighted more heavily than others.
