= Pionacercus =

Scientific classification
- Domain: Eukaryota
- Kingdom: Animalia
- Phylum: Arthropoda
- Subphylum: Chelicerata
- Class: Arachnida
- Order: Trombidiformes
- Family: Pionidae
- Genus: Pionacercus; Piersig, 1894

Genus of arachnids

Pionacercus is a genus of mites belonging to the family Pionidae.

The species of this genus are found in Europe.

Species:

- Pionacercus leuckarti (Piersig, 1894)
- Pionacercus norvegicus Thor, 1898
