= Neumania =

Scientific classification
- Domain: Eukaryota
- Kingdom: Animalia
- Phylum: Arthropoda
- Subphylum: Chelicerata
- Class: Arachnida
- Order: Trombidiformes
- Family: Unionicolidae
- Genus: Neumania; Lebert, 1879

Genus of spiders

Neumania is a genus of mites belonging to the family Unionicolidae.

The genus has cosmopolitan distribution.

Species:

- Neumania agilis Koenike, 1916
- Neumania ambigua Piersig, 1906
- Neumania armata Marshall, 1922
- Neumania armata Nayar, 1969
- Neumania atlantida (Lundblad, 1941)
- Neumania australica Smit, 2021
- Neumania breviseta K.Viets, 1959
- Neumania callosa (Koenike, 1895)
- Neumania cenotea Marshall, 1936
- Neumania comorosensis Pe
- Neumania deltoides (Piersig, 1894)
- Neumania distincta Marshall, 1922
- Neumania diversa Smit, 2017
- Neumania elliptica Walter, 1925
- Neumania excavata Lundblad, 1969
- Neumania extendens Marshall, 1922
- Neumania falcipes Koenike, 1906
- Neumania flagellata Walter, 1930
- Neumania fortiventa Smit, 2017
- Neumania fragilis Marshall, 1922
- Neumania fusiformis Smit, 2021
- Neumania ghanaensis Smit, 2021
- Neumania gila K.O.Viets, 1975
- Neumania grossipes (O.F.Müller, 1776)
- Neumania hickmani Marshall, 1933
- Neumania imitata Koenike, 1908
- Neumania indentata Smit & Pesic, 2010
- Neumania indica K.Viets, 1926
- Neumania kodiakica Marshall, 1924
- Neumania lacustris Smit, 2002
- Neumania limosa (Koch, 1836)
- Neumania longipes Walter, 1928
- Neumania longiseta Marshall, 1924
- Neumania macrospinosa Linnaeus, 2005
- Neumania maharashtris Cook, 1967
- Neumania martynowi Sokolow, 1931
- Neumania megulbana Cook, 1967
- Neumania multipora (Daday, 1900)
- Neumania multiscutata
- Neumania navina Cook, 1967
- Neumania nodosa (Daday, 1898)
- Neumania ovata Marshall, 1922
- Neumania papillator Marshall, 1922
- Neumania papillosa (Soar, 1902)
- Neumania phreaticola Motas & Tanasachi, 1948
- Neumania ilosa Koenike, 1906
- Neumania pubescens Marshall, 1929
- Neumania semicirculais Marshall, 1922
- Neumania silvestris
- Neumania simulans (Koenike, 1893)
- Neumania spinipes (O.F.Müller, 1776)
- Neumania tenuipalpis Marshall, 1922
- Neumania triangularis (Piersig, 1893)
- Neumania ulbana Cook, 1967
- Neumania uncinata Walter, 1927
- Neumania vernalis (O.F.Müller, 1776)
- Neumania verrucosa (Koenike, 1895)
- Neumania vietnamica
- Neumania vietsi Husiatinschi, 1937
- Neumania vivarna Cook, 1967
