= Tiphys (mite) =

Scientific classification
- Kingdom: Animalia
- Phylum: Arthropoda
- Subphylum: Chelicerata
- Class: Arachnida
- Order: Trombidiformes
- Family: Pionidae
- Genus: Tiphys; C. L. Koch, 1836

Genus of mites

Tiphys is a genus of mites in the family Pionidae. There are about 15 described species in Tiphys.

== Species ==
- Tiphys americanus (Marshall, 1937)
- Tiphys brevipes Habeeb
- Tiphys cooki Smith, 1976
- Tiphys curvipes Habeeb, 1954
- Tiphys diversus (Marshall, 1929)
- Tiphys marshallae Cook, 1956
- Tiphys mitchelli Cook, 1956
- Tiphys oliveri Habeeb, 1957
- Tiphys ornatus Koch, 1836
- Tiphys pionoidellus (Habeeb)
- Tiphys scaurus (Koenike, 1892)
- Tiphys simulans (Marshall, 1924)
- Tiphys torris (Muller, 1776)
- Tiphys vernalis (Habeeb, 1954)
- Tiphys vietsi Habeeb, 1955
