= Limnesiidae =

Scientific classification
- Kingdom: Animalia
- Phylum: Arthropoda
- Subphylum: Chelicerata
- Class: Arachnida
- Order: Trombidiformes
- Superfamily: Hygrobatoidea
- Family: Limnesiidae

Family of mites

Limnesiidae is a family of prostigs in the order Trombidiformes. There are at least 3 genera and 20 described species in Limnesiidae.

== Genera ==
- Centrolimnesia Lundblad, 1935
- Limnesia C. L. Koch, 1836
- Tyrrellia Koenike, 1895
