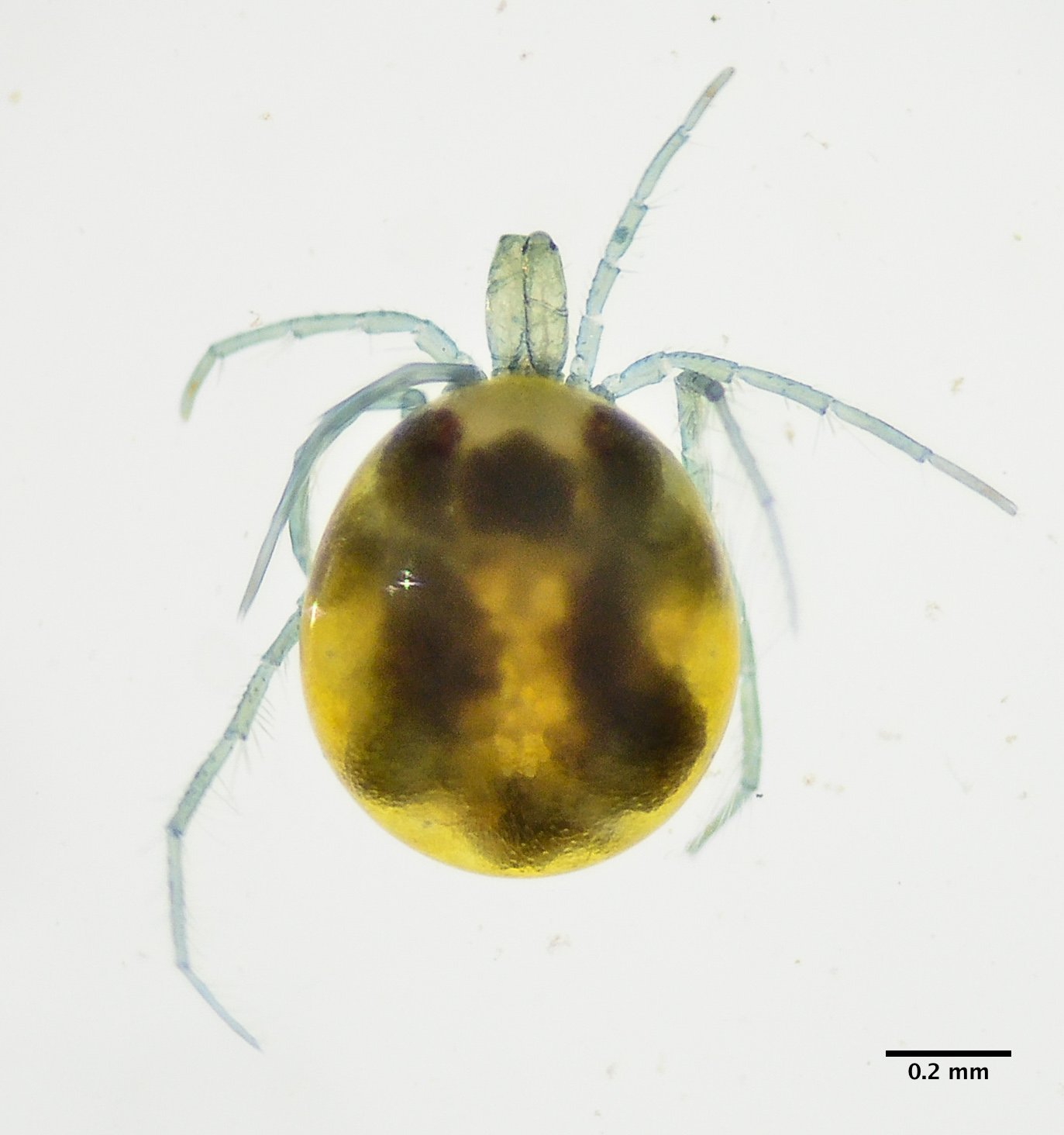
- An example of Limnesia

Scientific classification
- Domain: Eukaryota
- Kingdom: Animalia
- Phylum: Arthropoda
- Subphylum: Chelicerata
- Class: Arachnida
- Order: Trombidiformes
- Family: Limnesiidae
- Genus: Limnesia; Koch, 1835

= Limnesia =

Genus of arachnids

Limnesia is a genus of mites belonging to the family Limnesiidae.

The genus has cosmopolitan distribution.

Species:

- Limnesia acuminata Walter, 1925
- Limnesia alzatei (Duges, 1884)
- Limnesia fulgida (Koch 1836)
