= Unionicolidae =

Scientific classification
- Kingdom: Animalia
- Phylum: Arthropoda
- Subphylum: Chelicerata
- Class: Arachnida
- Order: Trombidiformes
- Suborder: Prostigmata
- Family: Unionicolidae

Family of mites

Unionicolidae is a family of prostigs in the order Trombidiformes. There are about 5 genera and at least 40 described species in Unionicolidae.

== Genera ==
- Huitfeldtia Thor, 1898
- Koenikea Wolcott, 1900
- Najadicola Piersig, 1897
- Neumania Lebert, 1879
- Unionicola Haldeman, 1842
