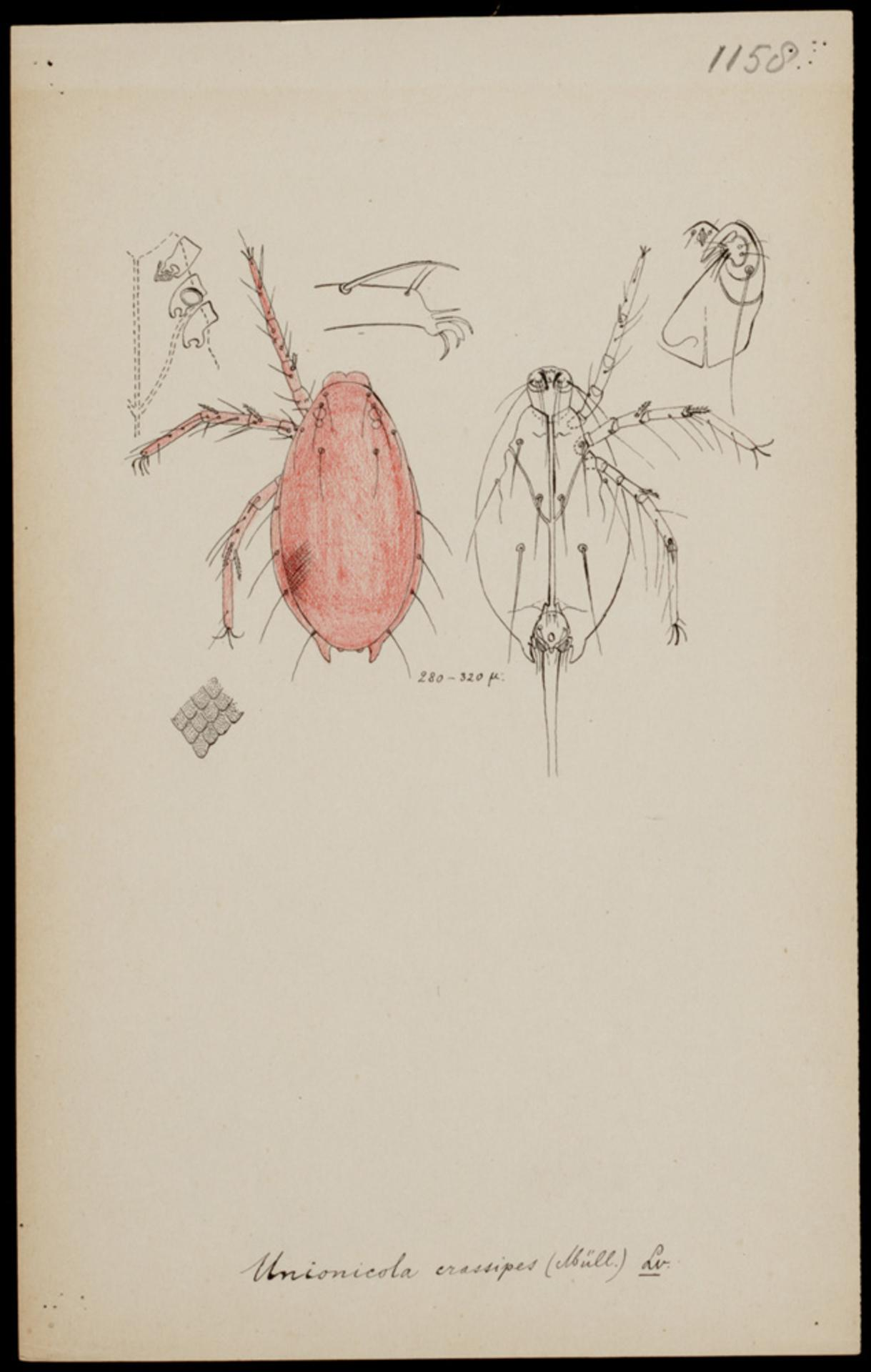
- Larva of Unionicola crassipes

Scientific classification
- Kingdom: Animalia
- Phylum: Arthropoda
- Subphylum: Chelicerata
- Class: Arachnida
- Order: Trombidiformes
- Family: Unionicolidae
- Genus: Unionicola; Haldeman, 1842

= Unionicola =

Genus of mites

Unionicola is a genus of freshwater arachnids, specifically water mites, belonging to the family Unionicolidae. The genus was described in 1842 by Samuel Stehman Haldeman. The genus has cosmopolitan distribution.

Most Unionicola are associated with molluscs, but Unionicola crassipes and Unionicola minor are associated with sponges of family Spongillidae. The association with mussels can be described as symbiotic. There is evidence that mites consume host tissue and can be associated with reduced host fitness, although the causal direction of the latter remains unclear.

Species include the following:

- Unionicola gracilipalpis
- Unionicola figuralis
- Unionicola crassipes
- Unionicola aculeata
- Unionicola ypsilophora (Bonz, 1783)
