= Hygrobatidae =

Scientific classification
- Kingdom: Animalia
- Phylum: Arthropoda
- Subphylum: Chelicerata
- Class: Arachnida
- Order: Trombidiformes
- Superfamily: Hygrobatoidea
- Family: Hygrobatidae; C.L.Koch, 1842

Family of mites

Hygrobatidae is a family of prostigs in the order Trombidiformes. There are about 78 genera and far more than 100 described species in Hygrobatidae.

== Genera ==
- Aciculacarus C.L. Hopkins, 1975
- Actinacarus Lundblad, 1953
- Africacarus K.O. Viets, 1962
- Ambiguobatella Viets, 1956
- Ambiguobates Viets, 1956
- Andesobates Smit, 2002
- Asiabates Wiles, 1999
- Aspidiobatella Cook, 1986
- Aspidiobates Lundblad, 1941
- Aspidiobatopsis Smit, 2002
- Atractidella Lundblad, 1936
- Atractides C.L. Koch, 1837
- Australiobatella Lundblad, 1953
- Australiobates Lundblad, 1941
- Australorivacarus K. O. Viets, 1978
- Caenobates K. O. Viets, 1978
- Caledoniabates Smit, 2002
- Callumobates Cook, 1988
- Camposea J. Schwoerbel, 1986
- Coaustraliobates Cook, 1974
- Cookabates M. S. Harvey, 1988
- Corticacarus Lundblad, 1936
- Crenohygrobates Lundblad, 1938
- Declinatobates K. O. Viets, 1984
- Decussobates Cook, 1988
- Diamphidaxona Cook, 1963
- Dockovdia Gledhill, 2003
- Dodecabates Viets, 1926
- Dropursa Cook, 1986
- Dubiobates Cook, 1988
- Eocorticacarus Besch, 1964
- Gondwanabates Imamura, 1984
- Groonabates Cook, 1986
- Hesperohygrobates Lundblad, 1953
- Homtinibates Cook, 2003
- Hopkinsobates Cook, 1985
- Hygrobatella Viets, 1926
- Hygrobates C.L. Koch, 1837
- Hygrobatopsis Viets, 1924
- Hygrobatractides K. O. Viets, 1981
- Hygrobatulus Viets, 1953
- Javanella Lundblad, 1971
- Kallimobates K. O. Viets, 1978
- Karlvietsia K.O. Viets, 1962
- Knysnabates Cook, 2003
- Kritaturus Cook, 1985
- Kyphohygrobatella Lundblad, 1936
- Kyphohygrobates Viets, 1935
- Maderomegapus Lundblad, 1941
- Mapuchacarus Besch, 1964
- Megapella Lundblad, 1936
- Mesobatella Viets, 1931
- Mesobates Thor, 1901
- Mixobates Thor, 1905
- Motasia Lundblad, 1953
- Neocorticacarus Lundblad, 1953
- Notohygrobates Cook, 1985
- Osornobates Cook, 1988
- Paraschizobates Lundblad, 1937
- Paraspidiobates J. Schwoerbel, 1986
- Plesiohygrobates Viets, 1956
- Polyhygrobatella Lundblad, 1953
- Procorticacarus K. O. Viets, 1978
- Rhynchaustrobates Cook, 1986
- Schizobates Thor, 1927
- Spongibates Wainstein, 1978
- Sterkspruitia Cook, 2003
- Stylohygrobates Viets, 1935
- Subcorticacarus Lundblad, 1937
- Szalayella Lundblad, 1953
- Tasmanobates Cook, 1986
- Tetrabates Thor, 1922
- Tetrahygrobatella Lundblad, 1953
- Thoracohygrobates Lundblad, 1936
- Tobelobates Cook, 1986
- Zabobates Cook, 1988
- Zelandobatella Hopkins, 1975
- Zelandobates Hopkins, 1966
