= Mate choice copying =

Strategy used by organisms

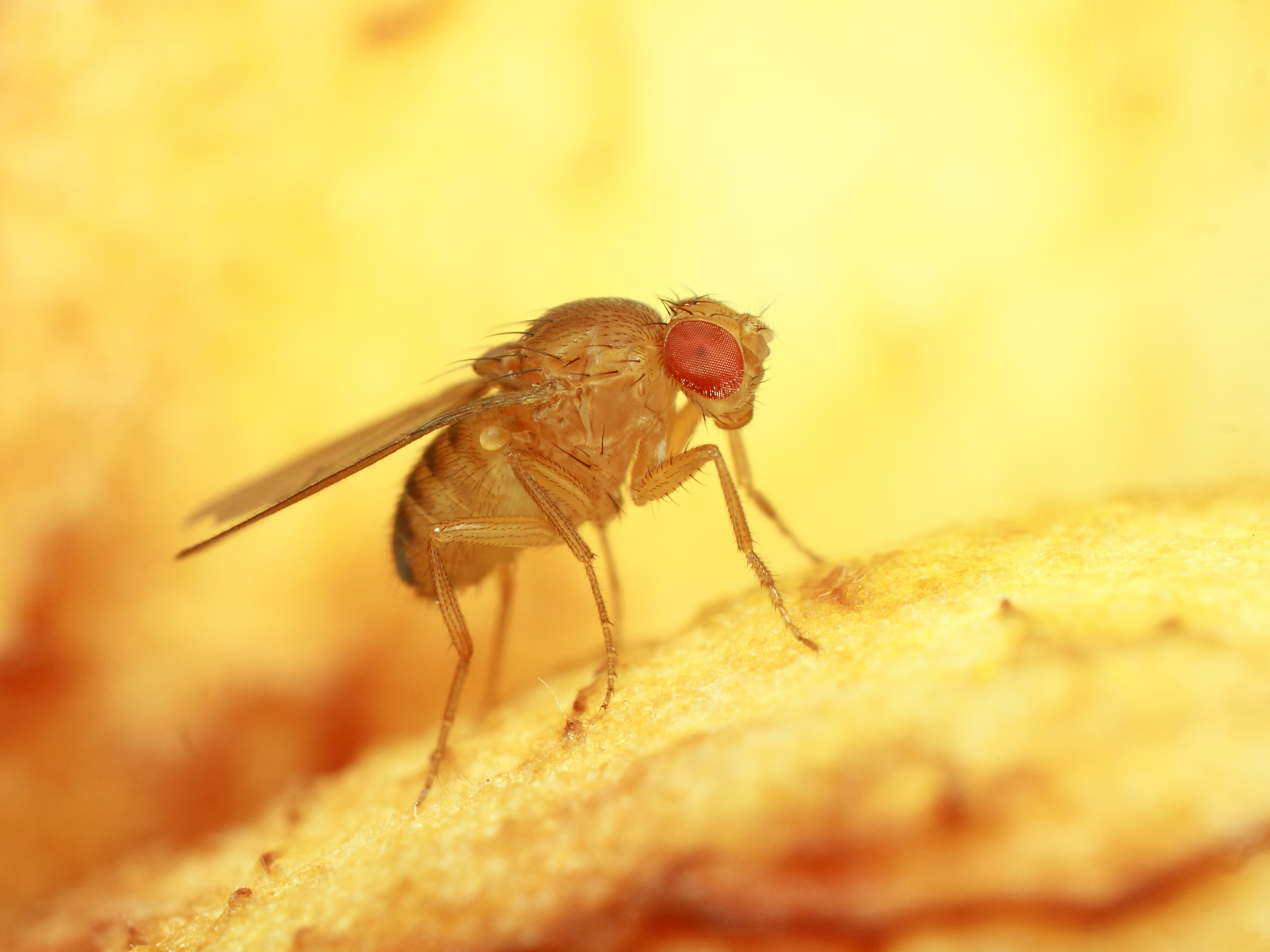
The fruit fly is one of the species in which females display mate-choice copying.

Mate-choice copying, or non-independent mate choice, occurs when an individual of an animal species copies another individual's mate choice. In other words, non-independent mate-choice is when an individual's sexual preferences get socially inclined toward the mate choices of other individuals. This behavior is speculated to be one of the driving forces of sexual selection and the evolution of male traits. It is also hypothesized that mate-choice copying can induce speciation due to the selective pressure for certain, preferred male qualities. Moreover, mate-choice copying is one form of social learning in which animals behave differently depending on what they observe in their surrounding environment. In other words, the animals tend to process the social stimuli they receive by observing the behavior of their conspecifics and execute a similar behavior to what they observed.

Mate choice copying has been found in a wide variety of different species, including (but not limited to): invertebrates, like the common fruit fly (Drosophila melanogaster); fish, such as guppies (Poecilia reticulata) and ocellated wrasse; birds, like the black grouse; and mammals, such as the Norway rat (Rattus norvegicus) and humans. Most studies have focused on females, but male mate copying has been also found in sailfin mollies (Poecilia latipinna) and humans.

== Mechanism ==
=== Visual copying ===
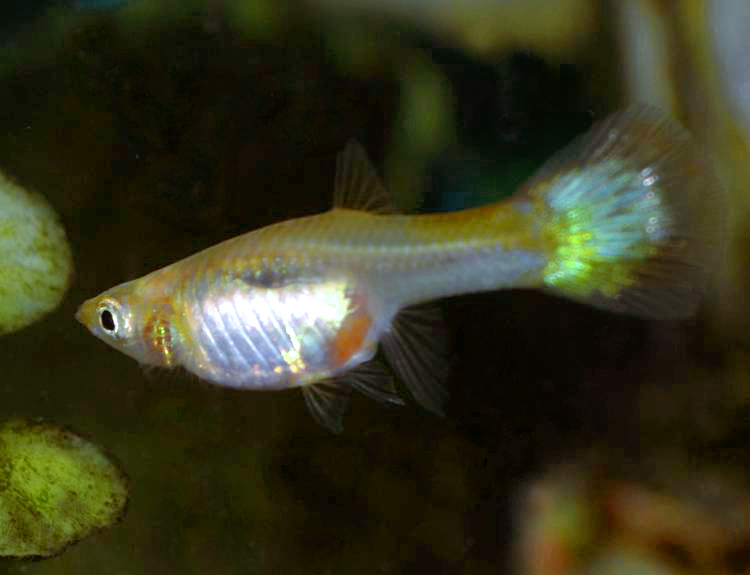
Female guppies tend to exhibit mate-choice copying by employing visual observation of a demonstrator female's mate choice.

Mate-choice copying requires a highly developed form of social recognition by which the observer (i.e. copier) female recognizes the demonstrator (i.e. chooser) female when mating with a target male and later recognizes the target male to mate with it. Though it might seem simple, observer females actually do not copy the choice of any haphazard, demonstrator female; instead, they copy based on their perception of the demonstrator female's quality. In guppies (Poecilia reticulata) for instance, females are more likely to copy the mate choice of a larger sized fish than to copy the mate choice of a fish of the same or a smaller size. Besides immediate copying based on visual cues, it has been hypothesized that observer females tend to—later on—choose other males with the same qualities as that of the target male the demonstrator mated with. However, it is not known whether this generalization of preference holds true or the observer's inability to discriminate the target male from other similar-looking males accounts for the behavior. Interestingly, in some instances, an observer female tend to copy a demonstrator's female choice only in the same geographical region (i.e. location) it has observed the demonstrator sexually interact with a target male; if the observer female is presented with the same target male in a different location, there is a less likelihood that the observer would execute the same mate choice.

=== Olfactory copying ===
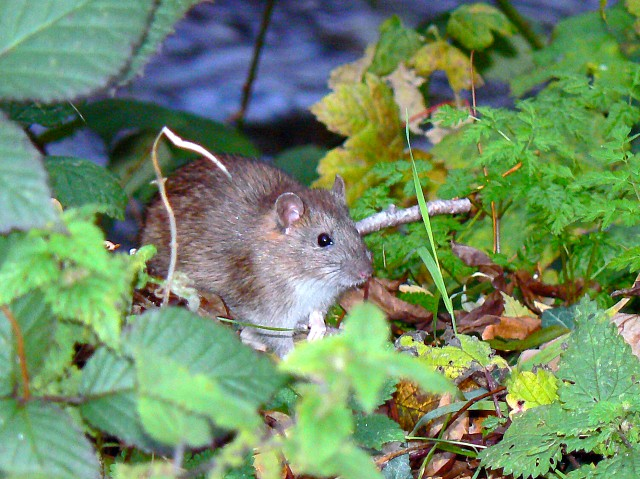
Naive, female Norway rats employ olfactory cueing to copy the mate choice of experienced females.

In some cases, a direct, visual observation of the sexual interaction between the demonstrator and the target is not necessary; female rodents, for instance, use olfactory stimuli as a reference to whether the target male has been chosen by other females or not. A female rodent may choose to mate with a target male if there is a smell of other females associated with this male’s urine, as an indication that it has been mated with by other fellow females.

== Neurobiology ==
As mentioned earlier, mate choice copying is a developed form of social recognition that requires highly efficient cognitive processes for the observer female to be able to not only identify the demonstrator female and the target male but also execute a suitable behavior (i.e. copying) in response to the observed stimulus. In other words, the execution of mate choice copying is an intricate behavior that most likely involves a coordinated function between the endocrine system, the digestive system, the nervous system, and the reproductive system. In addition to sex hormones, neurotransmitters such as oxytocin (OT) and arginine-vasopressin (AVP) are involved in mediating social recognition of demonstrator and target as well in sexual approach to target males. OT has proven to be of a particular importance to the mediation of mate-choice copying as OT gene-knockout female mice have failed to recognize the demonstrator female and the target male. Moreover, the OT gene-knockout mice have shown a significantly decreased, sexual interest in males even if these males have been previously observed mating with demonstrator females. Such results are likely to be attributed to OT's indispensable role in stimulating sexual arousal and feelings of trust in the female mice; absence of OT has hindered the knockout female mice from trusting the demonstrator female's mating choice, and from experiencing a general sexual attraction to males. Further research has also shown that OT itself is regulated by estrogen and testosterone as a part of the estrous cycles that female mice go through.

== Evolutionary origin ==
=== Benefits ===
Mate-choice copying has evolved to eliminate the possible costs—including time and energy—of mate-choice. The fact that mate-choice copying exists in various species is due to the differential abilities of females in choosing a desirable male with good quality genes. In other words, not all females have the same capability of making good decisions when it comes to mate-choice. Therefore, mate-choice copying as a behavior has evolved through social learning to educate those females—including naive ones—to choose a desirable male, allowing only good quality genes to be propagated in the population over time. For instance, naïve female mice that had just entered the estrus cycle for their first time might choose a male if its urine is associated with the smell of other, older females in the estrus cycle. Therefore, mate-choice copying reduces the error frequency in mate-choice among inexperienced females, guaranteeing an increased relative fitness for the copying females. Another example can be seen in black grouse, Tetrao tetrix, where the naive females in their first breeding season tend to mate later than experienced females so that the former can copy the choice of the latter.

Mate-choice copying also becomes effective when the females are constrained by time (i.e. if the breeding season is soon to end) in which case females tend to copy each other's choice to avoid going through the time-consuming choice process that might cost them not being able to mate at all. Mate-choice copying is also effective at eliminating the stress in females of monogamous species such as the Gouldian finch (Erythrura gouldiae) that would have otherwise had to mate with a less-desirable, poor-quality male. Another hypothesis that have been also proposed is that game theory applies to the mate-choice copying behavior where females choose whether to be an observer or a demonstrator based on the abundance of each in the population. A female might tend to become an observer in a population where demonstrators are more abundant to increase its chances of having access to a high-quality male and vice versa.

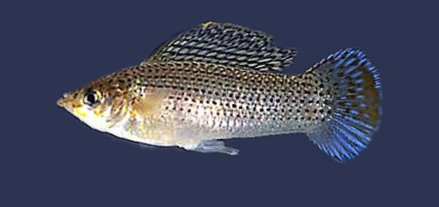
In some instances, as in sailfin molly, it is the males of a species that display mate-choice copying.

Despite the fact that mate-choice copying, in theory, reduces the relative fitness of those males that are not chosen, it reduces their risks of injury and possible death of the aggressive courtship behaviors that they would have otherwise participated in with the chosen, high-quality males. Some evidence have shown that in species where females display cryptic mate choice, males tend to display the reverse of mate choice copying to avoid mating with females that have been visually observed mating with higher-quality, rival males. Such a mate choice behavior is displayed by a male mainly to avoid wasting its energy in having a sexual interaction that might not necessarily increase its relative fitness if the female chose the sperms of the rival to fertilize its eggs. There are also some instances where the males of a certain species get to be the choosier sex due to their higher parental investment in the offspring than females; an example where males practice mate-choice copying would be sailfin mollies (Poecilia latipinna).

=== Costs ===
There has not been various evidence on the fitness costs of mate choice copying; however, it has been suggested that depending solely on social cues to choose a potential mate is not always advantageous. It, in fact, might in some cases lead to mating with an unfit, poor-quality male that has been chosen maladaptively by demonstrator females. Moreover, in species where males display mate-choice copying such as Atlantic mollies (Poecilia mexicana), the demonstrator male might employ what is known as the Deception Hypothesis in which the demonstrator male pretends to mate with an undesirable female to deceive the observer male into choosing this female. Such a deceitful behavior is facilitated by the demonstrator's ability to change its behavior when it senses the presence of the observer as well as the observer's inability to recognize the behavior of the demonstrator as deceitful. Consequently, the observer male mates with an undesirable, poor-quality female, negatively affecting the survival of the observer male's offspring and, in turn, its own relative fitness.

== Alternative hypotheses ==
Researchers have suggested other, alternative hypotheses that might explain as to why females might display nonindependent mate choice; these hypotheses include: Kin-associated genetic preferences, common environmental effects, consexual cueing, and associative learning.

=== Kin-associated genetic preferences ===
The proponents of this hypothesis argue that females tend to choose to mate with the same target male due to these females' shared innate preferences for the traits the target male holds. In other words, the genetic similarity of these females due to kinship is reflected in their mate choice behavior that other researchers can view as a mere act of social facilitation.

=== Common environmental effects ===
Some females tend to have the same mate choice due to abiotic factors rather than mate-choice copying. For instance, the distribution of food resources might limit the foraging ability of females to explore potential mates in farther regions; therefore, all females in such a confined region might end up mating with the same male because it holds the greatest potential among its rivals and not because it was targeted by demonstrator females. Another influencing biotic factor is predation; females threatened by predation would avoid foraging for a mate and, instead, mate with the male of the best quality traits in their confined region. This best quality male might be in most cases the same male.

=== Consexual cueing ===
In polygamous species such as fallow deer (Dama dama), an outsider female deer (i.e. a female that is not part of the harem) might choose to mate with the harem's dominant male because the female is attracted to being a part of the harem's large group of females rather than being attracted to the dominant male itself. Aside from mate choice copying, being part of a large female group would provide such an outsider female with protection, company, and food resources.

=== Associative learning ===
Sometimes, nonindependent mate choice is not a direct copying of an observed mating preference; in fact, it can be the result of an association that the observer female constructs between mating with a target male and receiving a desired award. For instance, in such species where males present the females with a nuptial gift as a prerequisite for mating with the female, observer females are more likely to associate mating with the same target male with the nuptial gift it might receive. Such an association, then, might lead the observer female to mate with the same target male the demonstrator has mated with. Even though there is not a lot of evidence to support this hypothesis, it offers a plausible explanation as to why females of a species might exhibit nonindependent mate choice.
