= Age disparity in sexual relationships =

In human sexual relationships, concepts of age disparity, including what defines an age disparity, have developed over time and vary among societies. Differences in age preferences for partners can stem from partner availability, gender roles, and evolutionary mating strategies, and age preferences in sexual partners may vary cross-culturally. There are also social theories for age differences in relationships as well as suggested reasons for "alternative" age-hypogamous relationships (see more at hypergamy). Age-disparate relationships have been documented for most of recorded history and have been regarded with a wide range of attitudes dependent on sociocultural norms and legal systems, either between heterosexual couples or same-sex couples.

== Statistics ==
Since the 1950s, the median age at first marriage for heterosexual couples in the US has increased by over eight years for each gender. The age disparity has remained relatively stable since the mid-1950s, after having contracted since at least 1890.

Statistics indicate an age difference in married couples. The 2017 US Current Population Survey shows that for heterosexual couples, 33.9% of the time, the husband and wife are within 2 years of each other. However, while in 19.6% of couples, the husband is 2–3 years older than their wife, in only 6.9% of couples, the wife is 2–3 years older than their husband. In addition, in 12.8% of couples, the husband is 4–5 years older than their wife, which is 9.4% higher than couples where wives are 4–5 years older. Furthermore, in 11.2% of couples, the husband is 6–9 years older than their wife, while in only 2.8% of couples, wives have the same age gap with their husbands. These age gaps are similar in Australia and the United Kingdom.

For same-sex couples, there is a tendency to form romantic bonds within a "broader age range" than with heterosexual couples, with larger age gaps. In August 2023, the U.S. Census Bureau, using data from the American Community Survey, stated that while same-sex couples were less likely "to have spouses who are the same age" than heterosexual couples. The agency also stated that 24% of same-sex couples had an age gap of two years or less, 21% had a 2–3 year age gap, 15% had a 4–5 year age gap, 20% had a 6–9 year age gap, 15% had a 10–19 year age gap, and 5% had a 20+ year age gap. In comparison, 35% heterosexual couples had an age gap of less than two years, and these couples had larger percentages with age gaps of 2–3 years, and 4–5 years than same-sex couples. In a related publication in April 2023, the agency stated that on average, the age gap for "men with a same-sex cohabiting/spouse is larger than the gap for those with an opposite-sex partner/spouse and women in a same-sex union." Previously, Mona Chalabi FiveThirtyEight said, citing anonymized self-reported data from Facebook, that the average age gap in "gay couples tends to get bigger the older people get." There are similar trends in Canada with Canadian census data from 2003 seeming to indicate more prevalent age gaps among same-sex couples, while other researchers have written about age-gap relationships in Kazakhstan, Norway, and Zimbabwe.

In 2013, Allure did a survey of 2,000 men and women, which indicated, in part, that queer readers were generally attracted to those people who were "more than 10 years" older than them, and that they attracted people "younger than themselves by more than 10 years", even more than heterosexual individuals, with societal pressure on women to "look young." Scholars Joanna Mizielińska and Antu Sorainen also said that lesbian relationships with one partner is "significantly older" than the other, is a "specific and longstanding cultural phenomenon, from famous historical figures...to more recent political and popular culture characters" as present in books like Patricia Highsmith's 1952 book, The Price of Salt, and examined how an age gap influences relationships and lives of two lesbian couples, one in Poland and the other in Finland. They further stated that queer and mainstream scholarship had silenced "the issue of the age gap as a potentially decisive factor" in relationships between lesbians, with a scarcity of academic literature on the topic, even though some of the first "lesbian films are almost all about the age difference."

Nonchalant Magazine noted that age-gap lesbian relationships are "genuinely more common in the queer community" and that queer social spaces "tend to be more age-diverse than straight ones." Pride.com listed 34 celebrity queer couples with age gaps ranging from 10 years to 47 years, asserting that the couples demonstrated that "love doesn't have a limit" and that varied life experiences might "even lead to stronger bonds." PinkNews interviewed lesbian couple and social media influencers Julia Zelg and Eileen de Freest, who had an age gap of 37 years. Diva noted various "high-profile age gap relationship[s]" among lesbians and bisexuals, including Ellen DeGeneres and Portia De Rossi as well as Sarah Paulson and Holland Taylor.

Heterosexual relationships with age disparities have been observed in various cultures. In certain instances, older men and younger women often seek one another for sexual or marital relationships, while other studies have indicated that older women sometimes date younger men as well, with wealth and apparent physical attractiveness often relevant. Other studies have indicated that oftentimes adolescent boys are sexually interested in adolescent girls and women who are somewhat older than them. Older men also display an interest in women of their own age. Other research suggests that these relationship patterns are more influenced by women's preferences than those of men.

For heterosexual couples, according to research, many men marry women younger than they are, with the difference being between two and three years in Spain, the UK reporting the difference to be on average about three years, and the US, two and a half. The pattern was also confirmed for the rest of the world, with the gap being largest in Africa. However, a study released in 2003 by the UK's Office for National Statistics concluded that the proportion of women in England and Wales marrying younger men rose from 15% to 26% between 1963 and 1998, and another study also showed a higher divorce rate as the age difference rose when either the woman was older or the man was older. A 2008 study, however, concluded that the difference is not significant, saying it wasn't a risk to marriages.

== Reasons for age disparity ==
People in heterosexual relationships enter into age-disparate relationships for complex and diverse reasons, and a 2021 review in the Journal of Family Theory and Review showed vast differences across contexts. Explanations for age disparity usually focus on either the rational choice model or the analysis of demographic trends in a society. The rational choice model suggests that people look for partners who can provide for them in their life (breadwinners); as men earn more as they get older, their partners will therefore prefer older men, with demographic trends concerned with the sex ratio in the society, the marriage squeeze, and migration patterns. Another explanation concerns cultural values: the higher the value placed in having children, the higher the age gap will be. Yet Canadian researchers have found that age-disparate couples are less likely to have children than similarly aged ones. As people have chosen to marry later and remarriage becomes more common, the age differences between couples have increased as well.

Publications, writers, and scholars have described different reasons for why those in same-sex couples are in relationships with age gaps. Joanna Mizielińska and Antu Sorainen stated, in their study, that age difference in lesbian relationships works as "an erotiser...[and] an attractor" that may increase sexual desire and influence the character of relationships, and is influenced by generation gaps, and cultural norms. They further stated that the "most common assumption" associated with this age gap is an older woman seducing a younger, and innocent woman, was faulty, noting how this assumption impacted behaviors of those within age-gap relationships and asserted there is more "complicated scene of desire" within these relationships in which "power dynamics between...partners is constantly shifting." Other scholars speculated that gay and lesbians begin age-gap relationships because they have a smaller group of possible partners compared to heterosexual people, and stated if this is the case it may increase the "latitude of acceptance when it comes to a potential partner's demographic characteristics."

A 1986 Brown University study noted that the social structure of a country determines the age difference between heterosexual spouses more than any other factor. One of the concerns of relationships with age disparities between heterosexual couples in some cultures is a perceived difference between people of different age ranges. This is because a society with a difference in wealth distribution between older and younger people may affect the dynamics of the relationship. Although the "cougar" trend, in which older women date much younger men, is often portrayed in the media as a widespread and established facet of modern Western culture, a British psychological study published in Evolution and Human Behavior in 2010 found the concept to be a "myth". The study concluded that men and women, generally, continued to follow traditional gender roles when searching for mates. The study found that most men preferred younger, "attractive" women, while most women, of any age, preferred successful, established men their age or older. However, the study was criticized for limiting its results to online dating profiles and for excluding the United States from the study.

== Evolutionary perspective ==
=== Evolutionary approach ===
The evolutionary approach, based on the theories of Charles Darwin, attempts to explain age disparity in heterosexual sexual relationships in terms of natural selection and sexual selection. Within sexual selection, Darwin identified a further two mechanisms which are important factors in the evolution of sex differences (sexual dimorphism): intrasexual selection (involves competition with those of the same sex over access to mates) and intersexual choice (discriminative choice of mating partners). Life history theory, that includes Parental Investment Theory, provides an explanation for people's mechanisms and strategies, leading to age disparity in relationships. Life history theory posits that individuals have to divide energy and resources between activities and this is shaped by natural selection.

Parental Investment Theory refers to the value that is placed on a potential mate based on reproductive potential and reproductive investment. The theory predicts that preferred mate choices have evolved to focus on reproductive potential and reproductive investment of members of the opposite sex. This theory predicts both intrasexual selection and intersexual choice due to differences in parental investment; typically there is competition among members of the lower investing sex (generally males) over the parental investment of the higher investing sex (generally females) who will be more selective in their mate choice. However, human males tend to have more parental investment than do other mammal males (although females still tend to have more parental investment). Thus, both sexes will have to compete and be selective in mate choices. These two theories explain why natural and sexual selection acts slightly differently on the two sexes so that they display different preferences.

A study conducted by David Buss investigated sex differences in mate preferences in 37 cultures with 10,047 participants. In all 37 cultures it was found that males preferred females younger than themselves and females preferred males older than themselves. A more recent study has supported these findings, conducted by Schwarz and Hassebrauck. This study used 21,245 participants between 18 and 65 years of age who were not involved in a close relationship. It was found that for all ages males were willing to accept females that are slightly older than they are (on average 4.5 years older), but they accept females considerably younger than their own age (on average 10 years younger). Females demonstrate a complementary pattern, being willing to accept older males (on average 8 years older) and were also willing to accept males younger than themselves (on average 5 years younger). This is somewhat different to human's close evolutionary relatives: chimpanzees.

=== Male and female preferences ===
Buss attributed the male preference for younger females to certain youthful cues. In females, relative youth and apparent physical attractiveness (which males valued more than females did) demonstrated cues for fertility and high reproductive capacity. Buss stated the specific age preference of around 25 years implied that fertility was a stronger ultimate cause of mate preference rather than reproductive value. From a life history theory perspective, females that display these cues are judged to be more capable of reproductive investment. This notion of age preference due to peak fertility is supported by Kenrick, Keefe, Gabrielidis, and Cornelius's study, which found that although teenage males would accept a mate slightly younger than they are, there was a wider range of preference for ages above their own.

Buss and Schmitt stress that although long-term mating relationships are common for humans, there are both short-term and long-term mating relationships. Their Sexual Strategies Theory describes the two sexes as having evolved distinct psychological mechanisms that underlie the strategies for short- and long-term mating. This theory is directly relevant and compatible with Life History and Parental Investment. Males tend to appear oriented towards short-term mating (greater desire for short-term mates than women, prefer larger number of sexual partners, and take less time to consent to sexual intercourse) and this appears to solve a number of adaptive problems including using fewer resources to access a mate. Although there are a number of reproductive advantages to short-term mating, males still pursue long-term mates, and this is due to the possibility of monopolizing a female's lifetime reproductive resources. Consistent with findings, for both short-term and long-term mates, males prefer younger females (reproductively valuable).

Some scholars have stated that females tend to be more demanding when picking a mate (as predicted by parental investment theory). They also tend to have a more difficult task of evaluating a male's reproductive value accurately based on physical appearance, as age tends to have fewer constraints on a male's reproductive resources. Buss attributed the older age preference to older males displaying characteristics of high providing-capacity such as status and resources. In terms of short-term and long-term mating, females tend to be oriented towards long-term mating due to the costs incurred from short-term mating.

Although some of these costs will be the same for males and females (risk of STIs and impairing long-term mate value), the costs for women will be more severe due to paternity uncertainty (cues of multiple mates will be disfavoured by males). Cues of good genes tend to be typically associated with older males such as facial masculinity and cheek-bone prominence. Dataclysm, a book by Christian Rudder based on data from the dating site OkCupid, found that young women tend to find men their own age or slightly older most desirable, e.g. 20-year-old women found 23-year-old men most attractive and 30-year-old women found 30-year-old men most attractive. In contrast, men displayed a consistent preference for women in their early 20s, e.g. 50-year-old men found 22-year-old women most attractive.

== Cross-cultural differences ==
Cross-culturally, research has consistently supported the trend in which males prefer to mate with younger females, and females with older males. In a cross-cultural study that covered 37 countries, preferences for age differences were measured and research supported the theory that people prefer to marry close to the age when female fertility is at its highest (24–25 years). Analysing the results further, cross culturally, the average age females prefer to marry is 25.4 years old, and they prefer a mate 3.4 years older than themselves, therefore their preferred mate would be aged 28.8 years of age. Males however prefer to marry when they are 27.5 years old, and a female to be 2.7 years younger than themselves, yielding their preferred mate to be 24.8 years old. The United Nations Marriage Statistics Department measures the singulate mean age at marriage (SMAM) difference, the difference in average age at first marriage between men and women, across the main regions in the world.

== Social perspectives ==
=== Age-hypogamy ===
Age-hypogamy is when a woman, in a heterosexual relationship, is older than the man; generally speaking however, hypogamy alone refers to an individual who marries someone of lower social status, class, or education level than themselves. Marriage between partners of roughly similar age is known as "age homogamy". Older female–younger male relationships are increasingly researched by social scientists. There may be many reasons why age-hypogamous relationships have been less frequent until recently. Sexual double standards in society, in particular, may account for their rarity. In many contexts, aging in women is seen to be associated with decreased sex appeal and dating potential.

There is debate in the literature as to what leads to age-hypogamy in heterosexual relationships. A number of variables have been argued to influence the likelihood of women entering into an age-hypogamous relationship, such as racial or ethnic background, level of education, income, marital status, conservatism, age, and number of sexual partners. It was shown that African American women were more likely to be in age-hypogamous or age-hypergamous marriages in comparison with White American women. However, more recent evidence has found that women belonging to racial categories besides African American or White were more likely to sleep with younger men.

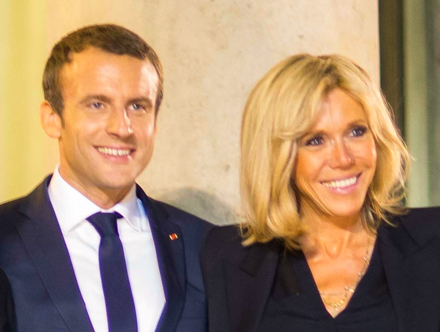
French President Emmanuel Macron and his wife Brigitte. The couple married in 2007; at the time he was 30 years old and she 54, with a 24-year age-hypogamous gap between the pair.

Another example illustrating the varying literature surrounding age-hypogamous relationships is research indicating that a woman's marital status can influence her likelihood of engaging in age-hypogamous relationships. Married women are less likely to be partnered with younger men than are non-married women. Despite social views depicting age-hypogamous relationships as short lived, a 2008 study from Psychology of Women Quarterly has found that women in age-hypogamous relationships are more satisfied and the most committed in their relationships than are younger women or similarly aged partners. Similarly, a 2023 study found that women with younger male partners scored higher in emotional intelligence, sexual self-efficacy, and subjective happiness. It has also been suggested that male partners engaging in age-hypogamous relationships are choosing beauty over age. A 2001 study found that when shown pictures of women of ages ranging from 20 to 45 with different levels of apparent attractiveness, regardless of age, men chose the more "attractive" individuals as long-term partners.

Some scholars have examined hypergamy among gay and lesbian couples, with some creating "families of choice" or entering hypergamous relationships "by accident" (in the play Amanyal' Enyoka), incorporating heterosexual norms into their relationships.

=== "Half-your-age-plus-seven" rule ===
Graph of the half-age-plus-seven rule

The "half-your-age-plus-seven" is a rule of thumb that holds that a person should never date someone whose age is less than half their own, plus seven years. According to this rule, a 28-year-old would date no one younger than 21 (half of 28, plus 7) and a 50-year-old would date no one younger than 32 (half of 50, plus 7). The rule was also cited in the webcomic XKCD, describing it as the "Standard Creepiness Rule." Although the provenance of the rule is unclear, it is sometimes said to have originated in France. The rule appears in John Fox Jr.'s 1903 novel The Little Shepherd of Kingdom Come, in American newspapers in 1931 attributed to Maurice Chevalier, and in The Autobiography of Malcolm X, attributed to Elijah Muhammad.

In many early sources, the rule was primarily presented as a formula to calculate the ideal age of a female partner at the beginning of a heterosexual relationship. Frederick Locker-Lampson's Patchwork from 1879 states the opinion "A wife should be half the age of her husband with seven years added." Max O'Rell's Her Royal Highness Woman from 1901 gives the rule in the format "A man should marry a woman half his age, plus seven." A similar interpretation is also present in the 1951 play The Moon Is Blue by F. Hugh Herbert: "Haven't you ever heard that the girl is supposed to be half the man's age, plus seven?", and also shown in the 1953 film adaptation. Despite this, there are contemporary sources indicating that a woman falling below this target age was still considered inappropriate, or otherwise a hindrance to the relationship. For example, in John Fox Jr.'s aforementioned 1903 novel The Little Shepherd of Kingdom Come, the rule is cited immediately before a woman is described as being "too young [for her potential partner], and she can wait."

A 2001 study found that the rule was fairly accurate at describing the minimum age of a woman that a man would marry or date. However, the rule was not found to be descriptive of the minimum age of a man that a woman would marry or date, nor (by reversing the formula) of the maximum age that either sex would marry or date. Some applied this rule to dating among same-sex couples, including between lesbian and gay individuals.

Mathematically equivalent, a person should never date someone whose age is more than twice their own, minus fourteen years. Also equivalently, two individuals should not date if either of them is younger than their age difference plus 14 years. According to this rule, individuals with an age difference of 10.5 years would not date each other if either of them is younger than 24.5 years old.

== Stigma and slang terms ==
=== Stigma and issues for age-gap relationships ===
Partner age disparities are typically met with some disdain in industrialized nations, and there are various derogatory terms for participants for those in heterosexual relationships. Some have noted that age-gap relationships have a "difference in power" and skewed power dynamics between those of different ages, with the British edition of Vogue stating that there are "submerged dynamics of power and exploitation in many relationships," including those without age disparities.

Same-sex couples can experience stigma from friends and family, and judgment from others, compulsory heterosexuality. Others pointed to issues with age-gap relationships, whether grooming or providing cover for intimate partner violence which falls into heterosexual norms. Nonchalant Magazine stated that for lesbian relationships with age gaps are not necessarily straightforward but require honest conversations, avoiding a mother-daughter dynamic, social scrutiny, and issues with power dynamics due to age, income, and financial stability, and may have an impact on sexual intercourse or intimacy. Sofie Roos, an expert on relationships, sexual health, and intimacy, in an article for Diva Magazine, had similar suggestions, noting that while society in Western countries is "generally really skeptical towards age-gap relationships," those in such relationships should prepare themselves mentally for criticism and work around differences in "age-related slang and lingo." She further added that an age gap can result in partners taking longer to completely understand one another. Some scholars, such as Esra Ummak, Salman Türken, Reidar Jessen, Ezgi Toplu-Demirtaş, and Ainagul Aitbayeva, have called age-gap relationships "unhealthy", said they "may exacerbate power differentials, thus contributing to IPV", and asserted that some age-gap relationships can "often result" in the younger partner "being controlled and dominated by their partner" if the younger partner is less experienced and less mature.

In December 2023, Lila Shapiro of The Cut said that the outrage over age-gap relationships represents a shift in "liberal attitudes," noting that when while "feminist and gay intellectuals" said that "sex between adults and adolescents should be tolerated" and defended when Manhattan came out in 1979, for gay, and interracial couples, these relationships suffered because people "felt judged" while people's unease with age gaps coincided with "feminist movements of the 20th century."

Scholars Joanna Mizielińska and Antu Sorainen stated that while lesbian couples with age gaps are not unhappy, their relationships are "fundamentally different" and built on expectations in which death is "always already present," with some more willing to be more open about their relationship publicly than others. They also asserted that younger lesbian partners may feel attached to the role of "final caretaker" of the partner who is older than them, with some age-gap relationships challenging "the happiness duty" under late stage capitalism.

=== Slang terms ===
In English-speaking countries, where financial disparity and an exchange of money for companionship is perceived as central to these relationships, the elder (presumably more wealthy) partner is often called a "sugar daddy" or "sugar mama", and the younger may be called a "sugar baby". In extreme cases, a person who marries a wealthy older partner – especially one in poor health – may be called a "gold digger". Film critics have used the term "gold digger" has been used to refer to some lesbian characters, and characters in films with queer subtext. Others have written about sugar dating for same-sex couples, using the words "sugar mommy", "sugar mama" and "sugar baby" for lesbian couples, and "sugar daddy" and "sugar baby" for gay couples.

Otherwise, an attractive younger woman pursued by a wealthy man who is perceived as wanting her only for her appearance or as a status symbol may be called a trophy wife. The opposite term, "trophy husband", is sometimes used to refer to the attractive stay-at-home husband of a much more famous man or woman while others use it to refer to the husband of a trophy wife, as he is her trophy due to his wealth and prestige. In addition, a woman of middle to elderly age who pursues younger men is a cougar or puma, and a man in a relationship with an older woman is often called a boytoy, toyboy, himbo, gigolo, or cub. In reverse, the terms trout and manther (a play on the panther term for women) are generally used to label an older man pursuing younger women. If the woman is extremely young, the man may be labelled a cradle-snatcher (UK) or cradle robber (US) If the much-younger target of affections is not of the legal age of consent or appears as such, the term jailbait may be applied to them, cautioning older partners against involvement. An older term for any licentious or lascivious man is a lecher. That term and its shortening, lech, have come to commonly describe an elderly man who makes passes at much younger women.

In gay slang, the term chickenhawk may be used. The term May–December, referring to a relationship in which one person is much older than the other, derives from the lyrics to the 1938 "September Song" about such a relationship, which includes the line "It's a long, long time from May to December". This has also been used to refer to same-sex relationships.

== See also ==
- Chronophilia
- Ephebophilia
- Homogamy (sociology)
- Hypergamy
- Mate choice
- Parental investment
- Polygamy
- Age and pregnancy
- Sexual selection in humans
