= Record Hospital =

Radio program on Harvard College's station WHRB in Cambridge, MA

Record Hospital is the long-running underground music program on radio station WHRB in Cambridge, Massachusetts. Founded in 1984, Record Hospital is run by the radio station's rock department and currently broadcasts on weeknights after classical music programming ends, running until the following morning when jazz programming begins. Staffed primarily by Harvard University undergraduates and alumni, Record Hospital serves the Boston area airwaves with an all-night punk and indie rock radio show with forays into noise and experimental music.

== History ==
Harvard Radio began as an on-campus station in 1940 until its expanded broadcast on FM radio in 1957. Broadcasting at 95.3 megahertz, WHRB had no ongoing rock music programming until the late 1960s, and students could choose to work only for its existing departments, such as news, jazz, classical music or sports. With the mounting of American counterculture, many students pushed for the inclusion of rock music on their station. The first show, Good Soup, had one hour of morning broadcast time each week in 1969. In the 1970s the show Midnight Rock ushered in the late-night program change by playing "Roll Over Beethoven" right after classical music ended for the day.

Throughout the 70s and 80s, WHRB's rock department had a number of different programs, including Rock and Roll Reveille in the 1970s, and Plastic Passions (a tribute to a song of the same name by The Cure that was released in April 1980). Plastic Passions began as a new wave music show that same summer when Scott Michaelsen (who coined the name) and Louis Kaplan served as co-program directors of the rock department. As new wave, and rock music in general, became more commercialized, WHRB's rock DJs turned to American punk and independent rock as set apart from what was played on other radio stations. Led by Geoffrey Weiss (who also gave the program its name), Jim Barber and Patrick Amory, Record Hospital began in 1984 as a small group of DJs dedicated to music that did not have a significant presence in mainstream radio or other media.

Record Hospital has continued in this same vein and plays a variety of punk, hardcore, indie pop, noise, psychedelic, no wave, and other forms of music with an underground, experimental or DIY aesthetic. In 1999 the show went global when WHRB began streaming over the Internet, and in 2009 released content to iPhone users via the WHRB app.

== Governance ==
Record Hospital's DJs are trained to run all on-air operations and hold administrative positions within the station. Record Hospital's full members must be Harvard undergraduates who pass a series of trials. The first of these, The Rock Test, was established in 1969 as a subjective measurement of musical tastes, aesthetics and knowledge. The next trial is a semester or more of training, which comprises music lectures, listening assignments, and reviews of trainees' broadcast quality. After passing these trials, DJs are admitted as WHRB and Record Hospital members and issued a broadcast license.

Non-members have also been known to serve stints as Record Hospital Djs. Among these have been Harvard graduate students, faculty, and attendees of the Extension School, as well as community members who are sometimes asked to fill in as summer DJs when much of the student body is away.

=== Rock Comment Book ===
Starting in 1984, Record Hospital DJs maintained a "Rock Comment Book" (RCB) to communicate with the rest of the department and keep up to date with the changing national music scene. These books are all kept in the department's record library and are accessible to all members. The Boston Phoenix interviewed Record Hospital members in 2008, publishing samples of old RCBs, described as "Pre-Internet Message Boards" complete with short handles like those used in chat rooms, complex acronyms as seen in modern text messaging, and incessant flame wars associated with online forums on many websites.

== Special programming ==
=== Orgies ===
Twice a year WHRB interrupts its regularly scheduled programming with "marathon-style musical programs devoted to a single composer, performer, genre, or subject." Dubbed "Orgies" (a registered trademark) since their inception in 1943, Record Hospital Orgies can last anywhere from one hour to a full week of airtime. Notable Orgies have included the Punk Rock Orgy (1986), The Rough Trade Orgy (1992), The Women of Rock Orgy (1993), The Rock of Washington DC Orgy (1993), The Rock of Scotland Orgy (1994), Mark E. Smith and The Fall Orgy (1999), The Riot Grrl Orgy (2000), The Krautrock Orgy (2003), The John Peel Orgy (2005), the Touch and Go Records Orgy (2007), the Epoch Orgy (2015), the Kate Bush Orgy (2016) and the Dunedin sound Orgy (2017).

=== Featured programs ===
Weekly segments of Record Hospital have been dedicated to special programming. These have included:

- Top 20, highlighting the most frequently played recent acquisitions to Record Hospital's library. This show still exists as of April 2018, and can be found every Monday night from 10pm-12am.
- Ultrasound, a show dedicated to music from the Boston area, often with live interviews or performances by local artists.
- Bad Vibrations, a program of odd and underground music from the 1950s and 60s. This show also continues, under different names, each Tuesday night from 10pm-12am.
- Monday Morning Strike, a hardcore punk radio show following WHRB's long-running Sunday Night at the Opera program.
- Live from the Recovery Ward, a weekly hourlong live show highlighting local acts from Boston and the Northeast at large. This program continues to run as of April 2018 every Friday night from 10pm-11pm.

=== In-studio bands ===
Local and touring bands frequently play exclusive live sets on Record Hospital. Past bands have included Huggy Bear, Bugskull, The Frogs, The In Out, Ho-Ag, Caspian, Conversions, Daniel Striped Tiger, The Folk Implosion, Portraits of Past, Brain Killer and The Streisand Effect.

=== Record Hospital Fest ===
The department hosts an annual music festival every spring. Past performers have included Ampere, Off Minor, Daniel Striped Tiger, Sinaloa, Death to Tyrants, Lucky Dragons, Dreamhouse, Carlos Giffoni, Tim Hecker, The Body, Heathen Shame, Libyans, Social Circkle, Brain Killer, Tiny Hawks, and the Skaters.

== Notable alumni ==
=== People ===
Alumni from the department, referred to as "ghosts," have become well known as writers, journalists, music industry executives, and musicians themselves. Notable ghosts include:

- Billy Ruane, late Boston area music promoter
- Christian Rudder, musician and founder of OK Cupid
- Douglas Wolk, author of books about music and comics
- Jesse Peretz, musician and film director
- Justin Rice, musician and film actor
- Kelefa Sanneh, journalist for New Yorker and The New York Times
- Patrick Amory, president of Matador Records
- Peter Rojas, tech blogger
- Stephanie Burt, literary critic
- T. Corey Brennan, musician and historical author
- Aamir Zakaria, professor, vascular surgeon and musician

Well-known DJs from rock programming on WHRB in the decades before Record Hospital include critic/songwriter/musician Deborah Frost and Twin Peaks writer Harley Peyton.

=== Bands ===
Record Hospital DJs have also played in numerous bands, including Chavez, Lemonheads, Galaxie 500, Luna, Bullet LaVolta, Swirlies, Fat Day, Titus Andronicus, Hilly Eye, The Silly Pillows, Gerty Farish, Eloe Omoe, Lucky Dragons, The Luddites, Miss Teen Schnauzer, Bludslide, Petty Crime, and The Pissed Officers, who later became Bishop Allen.
