= GRR =

GRR may refer to:

== Transport ==
- Agroar Carga Aérea, a defunct Portuguese airline
- Gadalar railway station, in Pakistan
- Georgetown Railroad, in Texas
- The IATA code for Gerald R. Ford International Airport, in Grand Rapids, Michigan
- Grand River Railway, in Ontario, Canada
- Vernon J. Ehlers Station, in Grand Rapids, Michigan
- Great River Road, a tourist route that parallels the Mississippi River from Lake Itasca, Minnesota, to Venice, Louisiana

== Other uses ==
- Gainesville Roller Rebels, an American roller derby league
- Gate River Run, a running race in Jacksonville, Florida
- Generalized resistance resource, a concept in the salutogenic model of health
- Gibran Rakabuming Raka (born 1987), former vice president of Indonesia
- Gradual release of responsibility, teaching model
- Green Reefers, a Norwegian shipping company
- Gross reproduction rate
- Grothendieck–Riemann–Roch theorem
- Gurara language, a Berber language of Algeria with the ISO 639-3 code grr

== See also ==
- Grrr (disambiguation)
