= Kelefa Sanneh bibliography =

List of works by or about Kelefa Sanneh, American journalist and music critic.

== Books ==
- Sanneh, Kelefa (2021). Major Labels: A History of Popular Music in Seven Genres. New York: Penguin Press.

== Essays and reporting ==
- Sanneh, Kelefa (August 20–27, 2001). "Gettin' paid : Jay-Z, criminal culture, and the rise of corporate rap". The Music Industry. The New Yorker.
- — (October 8, 2001). "The arranger : the many careers of Quincy Jones". The Critics. Books. The New Yorker.
- — (June 17–24, 2002). "Sympathy for the Devil : Eminem pleads his case". The Critics. Pop Music. The New Yorker.
- — (October 11, 2004). "Pray and grow rich". Letter from Atlanta. The New Yorker.
- — (August 4, 2008). "What he knows for sure : Tavis Smiley confronts the Obama candidacy". The Political Scene. The New Yorker.
- — (November 24, 2008). "Science projects". The Critics. On Television. The New Yorker. 84 (38): 122–123.
- — (November 7, 2011). "Cain's ghosts". The Talk of the Town. Campaign Diary. The New Yorker. 87 (35): 24–26.
- — (November 19, 2012). "Badass American". Profiles. The New Yorker. 88 (36): 34–45.
- — (November 26, 2012). "The hell-raiser". Profiles. The New Yorker. 88 (37): 56–65.
- — (February 11–18, 2013). "Spirit guide". Letter from Islay. The New Yorker. 89 (1): 51–61.
- — (March 25, 2013). "Harlem chic : how a hip-hop legend remixed name-brand fashion". Annals of Style. The New Yorker. 89 (6): 52–59.
- — (May 13, 2013). "Paint bombs : David Graeber's 'The Democracy Project' and the anarchist revival". The Critics. A Critic at Large. The New Yorker. 89 (13): 72–76.
- — (December 2, 2013). "Blockbuster : who needs hits?". The Critics. Books. The New Yorker. 89 (39): 70–74.
- — (February 9, 2014). "White Mischief". Books. The New Yorker. Article about Carl Van Vechten
- — (March 24, 2014). "Skin in the game : Under Armour knows athletes. Can it sell to everyone else?". Annals of Fashion. The New Yorker. 90 (5): 48–55.
- — (July 28, 2014). "Mean girl". Profiles. The New Yorker. 90 (21): 54–63.
- — (September 1, 2014). "Suburban renewal". The Talk of the Town. Dept. of Hoopla. The New Yorker. 90 (25): 21–22.
- — (October 20, 2014). "Breaking bread". The Talk of the Town. The Ropes. The New Yorker. 90 (32): 30, 32.
- — (February 9, 2015). "Don't be like that : does black culture need to be reformed?". The Critics. Books. The New Yorker. 91 (6): 62–68.
- — (April 6, 2015). "First-person singular : Waxahatchee's unadulterated songs". The Critics. Pop Music. The New Yorker. 91 (7): 7476.
- — (May 25, 2015). "The best defense : money and morals in the Fight of the Century". The Sporting Scene. The New Yorker. 91 (14): 40–51.
- — (June 29, 2015). "Pop up : Spraynard carries on the sophomoric yet imperishable pop-punk tradition". Goings on About Town. Night Life. The New Yorker. 91 (18): 10.
- — (June 29, 2015). "Mr. Popular : Sam Hunt's music is radio-friendly. But is it country?". The Critics. Pop Music. The New Yorker. 91 (18): 72–73.
- — (September 14, 2015). "Body Count". A Critic at Large. The New Yorker.
- — (February 29, 2016). "Chill in the air : the rise of Kygo's laid-back house music". The Critics. Pop Music. The New Yorker. 92 (3): 76–77.
- — (April 25, 2016). "Godmother of Soul : Erykah Badu's expanding musical universe". Profiles. The New Yorker. 92 (11): 50–57.
- — (May 9, 2016). "Cool Papa". Profiles. The New Yorker.
- — (July 11–18, 2016). "There goes the neighborhood : is it really a problem when poor areas get richer?". The Critics. A Critic at Large. The New Yorker. 92 (21): 80–85.
- — (August 8–15, 2016). "Out of the trap : can Gucci Mane survive his legend?". The Critics. Pop Music. The New Yorker. 92 (24): 68–70.
- — (November 7, 2016). "The moral minority : if the Southern Baptist church can't be bigger, Russell Moore wants it to be better". Annals of Religion. The New Yorker. 92 (36): 34–43.
- — (March 20, 2017). "As is : the techno d.j. Nina Kraviz stops off at Schimanski". Goings on About Town. Night Life. The New Yorker. 93 (5): 24.
- — (June 19, 2017). "The Prog Spring : was progressive rock the end of pop-music history? Yes and no". The Critics. A Critic at Large. The New Yorker. 93 (17): 67–71.
- — (November 6, 2017). "Against the tide : what's behind Tulsi Gabbard's unconventional politics?". Profiles. The New Yorker. 93 (35): 36–45.
- — (December 28, 2020). "Drink it in : how Morgan Wallen became the most wanted man in country music". The Critics. Pop Music. The New Yorker. 96 (42): 87–89.
- — (May 31, 2021). "Guns and butter : have fights over rights led us astray?". The Critics. A Critic at Large. The New Yorker. 97 (14): 59–64.
- — (September 6, 2021). "Spirit guide : reinventing a great distillery". Letter from Islay. February 11 & 18, 2013. The New Yorker. 97 (27): 48–52, 54–57.
- — (September 13, 2021). "Part-time punk : learning to love music—and to hate it too". Personal History. The New Yorker. 97 (28): 28–33.
- — (April 25 – May 2, 2022). "Tough business : the rapper Fivio Foreign survived a gang war. Can he go mainstream?". Our Local Correspondents. The New Yorker. 98 (10): 30–35.
- — (September 26, 2022). "The fall and rise of Shane Gillis". Annals of Comedy. The New Yorker. 98 (30): 30–36.
- — (April 3, 2023). "Under God". Reporting & Essays. The New Yorker. 99 (7): 22–25.
