= Grrr =

Grrr or grr is an onomatopoeia for growling and may refer to:

== Music ==
- Grrr Records, a French avant-garde jazz record label

=== Albums ===
- Grrr..., a 2009 album by Bishop Allen
- GRRR! It's Betty Boo, a 1992 album by Betty Boo
- Grrr, a 2016 album by Cloroform
- Grrr (Hugh Masekela album) (1966)
- GRRR!, a 2012 compilation album by the Rolling Stones
- Grrr!, a 1992 album by Lapinlahden Linnut

== Other uses ==
- Grrr (film), a 2024 Malayalam Indian film
- Grrr (play), a play by Dusty Hughes
- Grrr (advertisement), a 2004 British advertisement for Honda i-CDTi engines
- Grrr!, a magazine of People for the Ethical Treatment of Animals
- Pink, Vol. 1: GRRR!, a 2004 art book by Scott Morse
- GRRR, ticker symbol for the publicly traded Gorilla Technology Group Inc.

== See also ==
- GRR (disambiguation)
- "Grrrr" (song), a 2009 song by David Guetta
- ¡Grrrr!, a 2006 album by Moderatto
- GRRRRR!, a 2015 book by Rob Biddulph
- Grrrrrrrrrrr!!, a 1965 painting by Roy Lichtenstein
