= Charm School =

Charm School or charm school may refer to:

== Education ==
- Charm school or finishing school, an institution providing young women with training in social graces
- The Company of Youth, the Rank Organisation's short-lived talent school for its young contract players, popularly known as the Rank Charm School

== Music ==
- Charm School (Bishop Allen album), 2003
- Charm School (Roxette album), 2011

== Film and television ==
- Charm School (film), a 2007 Mexican film
- The Charm School (film), a lost 1921 American silent comedy film
- Charm School (TV series), a reality television series that aired on VH1
  - Charm School with Ricki Lake, a spin-off of the VH1 series

== Literature ==
- The Charm School (novel), a 1988 spy thriller novel by Nelson DeMille
