= Kelefa Sanneh =

American journalist and music critic

- Born: Kelefa T. Sanneh; 1976 (age 49–50); Birmingham, West Midlands, England
- Education: Harvard University (BA)
- Occupations: Journalist; music critic

Kelefa T. Sanneh (born 1976) is an American journalist and music critic. From 2000 to 2008, he wrote for The New York Times, covering the rock and roll, hip-hop, and pop music scenes. Since 2008 he has been a staff writer for The New Yorker. In 2021, Sanneh published Major Labels: A History of Popular Music in Seven Genres.

== Early life ==
Sanneh was born in Birmingham, West Midlands, England, and spent his early years in Ghana and Scotland, before his family moved to Massachusetts in 1981, then to Connecticut in 1989. His father, Lamin Sanneh, was born in Janjanbureh, Gambia, and was a professor of theological history at Yale University and Yale Divinity School. Kelefa's mother, Sandra, is a white South African linguist who teaches the isiZulu language at Yale.

Sanneh graduated from Harvard University in 1997 with a degree in literature. While at Harvard he worked for Transition Magazine and served as rock director for WHRB's Record Hospital. Sanneh played bass in the Harvard bands Hypertrophie Shitstraw, MOPAR, Fear of Reprisal and TacTic, as well as a Devo cover band that included members of Fat Day, Gerty Farish, Bishop Allen and Lavender Diamond. Sanneh's thesis paper, The Black Galactic: Toward A Greater African America, combined interests in music, literature and culture in writing about The Nation of Islam and the Sun Ra Arkestra as efforts to transcend oppression in the African-American experience with desires to travel into outer space.

== Career ==
Sanneh garnered considerable publicity for an article he wrote in the October 31, 2004, edition of The New York Times titled "The Rap against Rockism". The article brought to light to the general public a debate among American and British music critics about rockism, a term Sanneh defined to mean "idolizing the authentic old legend (or underground hero) while mocking the latest pop star; lionizing punk while barely tolerating disco; loving the live show and hating the music video; extolling the growling performer while hating the lip-syncher." In the essay, Sanneh further asks music listeners to "stop pretending that serious rock songs will last forever, as if anything could, and that shiny pop songs are inherently disposable, as if that were necessarily a bad thing. Van Morrison's 'Into the Music' was released the same year as the Sugarhill Gang's 'Rapper's Delight'; which do you hear more often?"

Sanneh's review of Beyoncé's debut album, Dangerously in Love, titled "The Solo Beyoncé: She's No Ashanti", published on July 6, 2003, in the New York Times, has garnered a cult following, with the headline circulating on the internet over the years as a meme.

Before covering music for the Times, Sanneh was the deputy editor of Transition, a journal of race and culture, based at the W. E. B. Du Bois Institute for African and African American Research, at Harvard University. His writing has also appeared in The Source; Rolling Stone; Blender; The Village Voice; Man's World; Da Capo Best Music Writing in 2002, 2005, and 2007; and newspapers around the world.

Sanneh wrote the "Project Trinity," which appeared in The New Yorker's April 7, 2008, edition, to give context to the controversial comments of Reverend Jeremiah Wright, who was Barack Obama's pastor. The article provides a historical context of the Trinity United Church of Christ, Obama's church, and to Wright, the former pastor of Trinity.

In 2008, he left The New York Times to join The New Yorker as a staff writer. As of 2009, Sanneh lived in Brooklyn.

Sanneh's first book, Major Labels: A History of Popular Music in Seven Genres, was published by Penguin Press in October 2021.

== Bibliography ==
- Major Labels: A History of Popular Music in Seven Genres. New York: Penguin Press. 2021.
