= Broken String =

Broken String may refer to:

- Broken string, in the process of tripping pipe
- "Broken String", a song by Jay Chou from the 2003 EP Hidden Track
- The Broken String, a 2007 book of poetry by Grace Schulman
- "The Broken String", a 2013 short story by Diane Chamberlain
- The Broken String, a Dutch documentary series based on the 1911 book Specimens of Bushman Folklore
- The Broken String: The Last Words of an Extinct People, short-listed for the 2004 John Llewellyn Rhys Prize

== See also ==
- Bishop Allen & The Broken String, a 2007 album by Bishop Allen and the Broken String
- Song of the Broken String: After the ǀXam Bushmen, a 1991 book of poetry by Stephen Watson
- The Broken String Band, an American folk rock band
