= The Evolution of Desire =

Evolutionary psychology book

- First edition cover
- Author: David Buss
- Subject: Human mating
- Publisher: Basic Books
- Publication date: 1994; 2003 (2nd edition); 2016 (3rd edition)
- Publication place: United States
- Pages: 262
- ISBN: 0-465-07750-1

The Evolution of Desire: Strategies of Human Mating is a 1994 book by evolutionary psychology professor David Buss. It is the first book to present a unified theory of human mating behaviour "based not on romantic notions... but on current scientific evidence." In the largest study of human mating at the time, 10,047 people were surveyed in 37 cultures across six continents and five islands. Buss expands on Donald Symons' The Evolution of Human Sexuality (1979) by examining all the actions that occur before and after sexual activity: strategies of mate competition, mate attraction, mate selection, mate retention, mate poaching, sexual conflict, mate ejection, and remating over a lifespan.

The book took four years to write based on a decade of research by Buss. A key premise of his work is that humans have multiple mating strategies, some of which reveal important sex differences. Buss attributes this to instinctual adaptations which he argues are universal across cultures and rooted in ancestral selection pressures. Similarities between men and women involve their use of deception, sexual display, and denigration of intrasexual rivals.

Two chapters were added in a 2003 revised edition. The third edition was released in 2016, containing new material integrated throughout the book.
