= Patrick Amory =

Historian and an executive in the recorded music industry

Patrick Amory (born 1965) is a historian and an executive in the recorded music industry.

== Early life ==
Patrick Amory was born in New York City on July 10, 1965, to literary parents. His father, the late Hugh Amory, was noted as the most "rigorous" and "methodologically sophisticated" historian of the book in early America. He attended the Commonwealth School in Boston, Massachusetts.

== Academia ==
Patrick Amory graduated from Commonwealth School in Boston, gained a bachelor's degree in history from Harvard University where he founded the Record Hospital program on radio station WHRB. Amory subsequently earned an M. Phil. and Ph.D. at the University of Cambridge in late antique and early medieval history and published People and Identity in Ostrogothic Italy, 489-554 (Cambridge University Press). Amory's book was considered an "illustration of the recent interest of historians in ethnogenesis" and described as "brilliant and remorseless" by Peter Brown. The book attempted to up-end the theory of the barbarian invasions and the fall of the Western Roman Empire, via a case-study of individual reactions in the province of Italy, a core region of the Mediterranean culture-province, during a period of intense political change. The main ideas of the book have met with mixed response, with historians such as Peter Heather objecting to some of its more radical theses.

== Music industry ==
In the mid-late 80s Amory ran the small independent record label Amory Arms which released a handful of records only including the first Lemonheads 7" 'Laughing All The Way To The Cleaners' in 1989 and Deathwish 'Tailgate' 7" in 1989 (recorded in 1983) which is now a now highly collectable Boston Hardcore record.

Amory had been active in independent rock since the 1980s, including stints as Rock Director and Program Director at WHRB-FM (Harvard's radio station). In 1994 he left academia to work as general manager of Matador Records, one of the premier independent rock record labels of the 1990s. Amory together with Gerard Cosloy and Chris Lombardi at Matador Records are credited with pursuing the preservation of artistic freedom while preserving a viable business model through "realistic success". Amory has lived and worked in New York since 1994.

== Works ==
- Amory, Patrick (1997). People and Identity in Ostrogothic Italy, 489-554. Cambridge Studies in Medieval Life and Thought. Cambridge University Press. ISBN 0-521-57151-0.
