= WHRB =

- Cambridge, Massachusetts; United States
- Broadcast area: Greater Boston
- Frequency: 95.3 MHz
- Branding: WHRB 95.3 FM

Programming
- Format: Variety

Ownership
- Owner: Harvard Radio Broadcasting Co., Inc.

History
- First air date: December 2, 1940 (closed-circuit AM); May 17, 1957 (commercial FM, at 107.1)
- Former call signs: WHRB-FM (1957–1978)
- Former frequencies: 107.1 MHz (1957–1959)
- Call sign meaning: Harvard Radio Broadcasting

Technical information
- Licensing authority: FCC
- Facility ID: 26341
- Class: A
- ERP: 1,450 watts
- HAAT: 185 meters (607 ft)
- Transmitter coordinates: 42°21′8.4″N 71°3′23.2″W

Links
- Public license information: Public file; LMS
- Webcast: Listen live
- Website: www.whrb.org

WHRB is non-profit FM radio station in Cambridge, Massachusetts. It broadcasts at 95.3 MHz and is operated by students at Harvard College. The station is owned by Harvard Radio Broadcasting Co., Inc., a non-profit corporation independent of Harvard University.

== History ==
WHRB was one of America's first college radio stations, initially signing on as a carrier current station on December 2, 1940. After acquiring funding from The Harvard Crimson, the station's first call sign was WHCN ("Harvard Crimson Network"). It broke from the Crimson in 1943 and adopted the call sign WHRV ("Harvard Radio Voice"). Harvard Radio Broadcasting Co., Inc., the non-profit corporation that owns the station, was formed February 1, 1951, and the current call sign adopted.

In order to reach audiences beyond Harvard's campus, the corporation acquired a commercial FM broadcast license from the Federal Communications Commission (FCC) and began regular broadcasting on May 17, 1957, at 107.1 MHz. A few years later, the station changed frequency to 95.3 MHz, where it has remained since. The broadcast area expanded considerably in 1995 when the main transmitter was relocated from atop Holyoke Center (now called the Smith Campus Center) in Harvard Square to its present location atop One Financial Center in downtown Boston. (A facility remains at the Smith site for backup purposes.) Broadcasts went global when internet retransmission of its programs began on November 18, 1999. In 2009, WHRB made available for download the first stand-alone college radio station iPhone app.

== Programming ==
WHRB is a confederacy of on-air departments, each with its own staff, training requirements, and allocation of airtime. Departments include Classical Music, The Jazz Spectrum, The Blues Hangover, Sports, News, The Darker Side, and Record Hospital. During the academic year, the station publishes several detailed program guides, describing its regular programming as well as the Orgy periods that end each semester.

Orgies (the term is a registered trademark of the station) are consecutive presentations of the entire musical output of composers, record labels, or genres, sometimes running 24 hours a day for a week or more. Station legend has it that these began when an exuberant undergraduate in 1943 decided to celebrate his passing a difficult exam by broadcasting all nine Beethoven symphonies in order. Orgies continue to take place during exam periods, allowing the station to be run with a reduced on-air staff at these busy times. "Orgies" are broadcast each year throughout most of December, and again from the beginning of May through Harvard's commencement ceremony near the end of that month.

Some of WHRB's regular programs have long histories of their own. For example, the country music program Hillbilly at Harvard dates back to 1948, and Sunday Night at the Opera is one of the longest-running programs in its genre in the United States. The station's underground rock department, Record Hospital, began in 1984 and hosts an annual music "fest".

WHRB also broadcasts live play-by-play coverage of all Harvard University football and men's hockey games, along with occasional broadcasts of other Harvard sports like men's basketball and women's hockey, and is the Boston-area home, in season, for the weekly broadcasts of the Metropolitan Opera. WHRB has broadcast the weekly Sunday services at Harvard's Memorial Church since the early 1960s.

== Notable alumni ==
Prominent broadcasters who began their careers at WHRB include Martin Bookspan (voice of the New York Philharmonic), Steve Curwood (host of Living on Earth on NPR), Bruce Morton (CNN), Dan Raviv (CBS), Scott Horsley (NPR), and Chris Wallace (Fox News). Harpsichordist Igor Kipnis, New York Times critics John Rockwell and Jon Caramanica, New Yorker writers Alex Ross and Kelefa Sanneh, pianist and composer Robert D. Levin, author and critic Douglas Wolk, ZDNet founder Michael Kolowich, Justin Rice and Christian Rudder of Bishop Allen, Karl Rove's personal attorney Robert Luskin, visual artist Alex Kahn, record producers Thomas Blanchard Wilson Jr. and Jim Barber, and the members of the chimp rock band Fat Day have been on the station's staff. David Mays, the founder of The Source magazine, hosted a popular show, Street Beat. Raphael Bostic, current president of the Federal Reserve Bank of Atlanta, broadcast basketball and R&B while at the station. Cara Jones, singer-songwriter and DJ at J-Wave in Tokyo, Japan.

Mentor to these alumni for almost the last 60 years, and to everyone else who worked at the station, was David Elliott, a constant WHRB presence who filled a wide range of roles since his student days, from savvy and precise classical and opera curator-broadcaster to orgy mastermind, from board chair to eminent adviser. Elliott died November 12, 2020, at age 78.

== See also ==
- Campus radio
- List of college radio stations in the United States
