= Bishop Allen & The Broken String =

Bishop Allen and the Broken String

Studio album by Bishop Allen
- Released: July 24, 2007
- Genre: Indie rock
- Length: 40:19
- Label: Dead Oceans
- Producer: Justin Rice, Christian Rudder

Bishop Allen chronology
Charm School (2003)	Bishop Allen and the Broken String (2007)	Grrr... (2009)

Professional ratings
Review scores
Source	Rating
AllMusic	(3.5/5)
Pitchfork Media	(6.0/10)
Rockfeedback	(4.0/5)

Bishop Allen and the Broken String is the second full-length album by the indie rock group Bishop Allen. It was released on July 24, 2007.

Nine of the twelve tracks are re-workings of selections from the 12 EP project the band did in 2006.

== Track listing ==
1. "The Monitor" – 3:42
2. "Rain" – 3:36
3. "Click, Click, Click, Click" – 3:08
4. "The Chinatown Bus" – 3:22
5. "Flight 180" – 5:10
6. "Like Castanets" – 3:17
7. "Butterfly Nets" – 3:12
8. "Shrinking Violet" – 1:51
9. "Corazon" – 4:21
10. "Middle Management" – 2:43
11. "Choose Again" – 3:12
12. "The News from Your Bed" – 2:45

Many uncommon instrumental arrangements are found in The Broken String, such as "Butterfly Nets" (ukulele, saxophone) or "Shrinking Violets" (banjo, oboe).
