= Bishop Allen =

American indie rock band

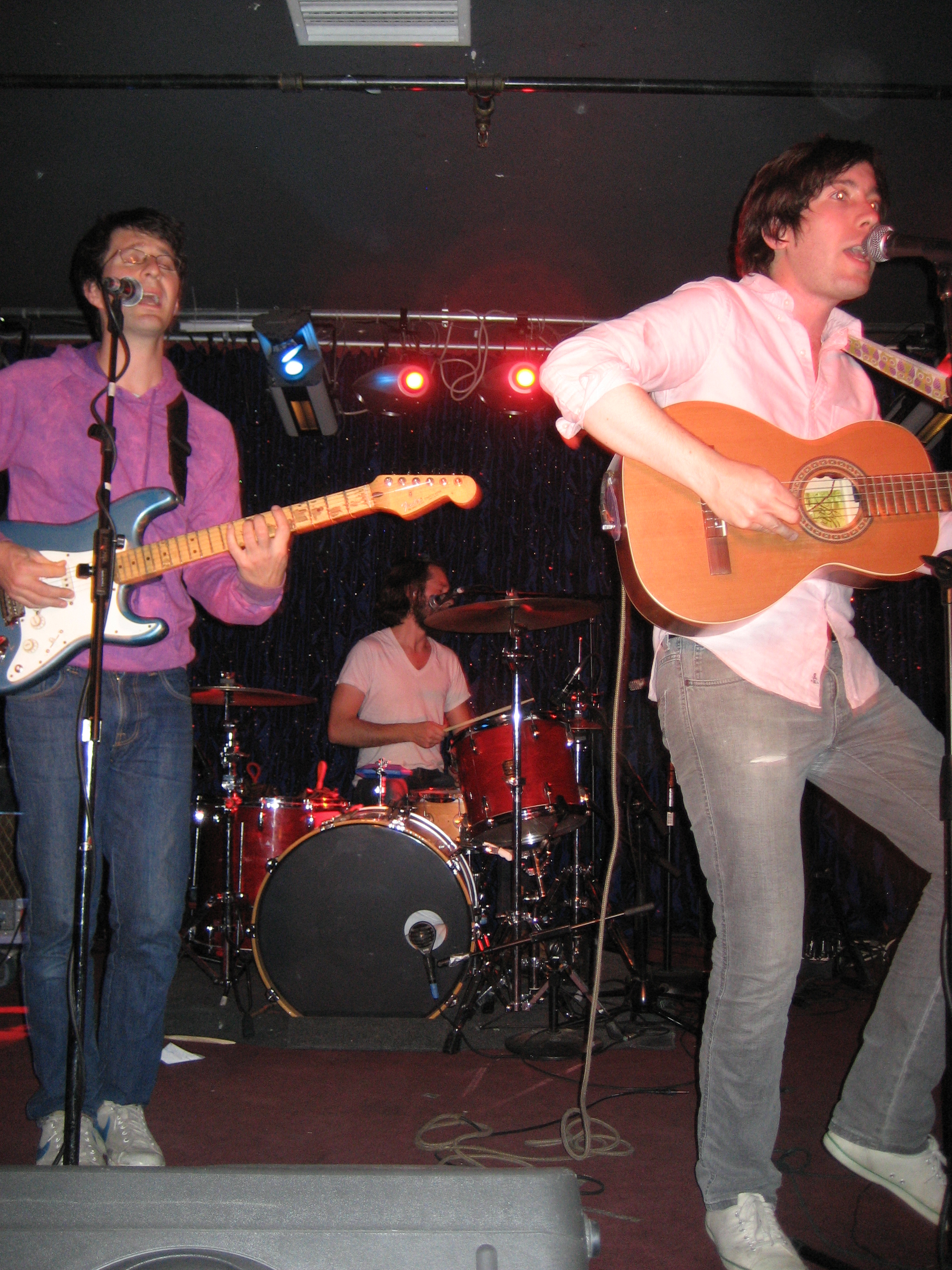
- Bishop Allen live in Tucson, Arizona, March 22, 2009

Background information
- Origin: Brooklyn, New York, U.S.
- Genre: Indie rock
- Years active: 2001–2015, 2025–present
- Labels: Champagne School; Dead Oceans
- Members: Justin Rice (vocals & keyboards); Christian Rudder (stringed instruments) Darbie Rice (Nowatka) (keyboards, stringed instruments); Keith Poulson (bass) Michael Tapper (drums)
- Past members: Kate Dollenmayer Jon Natchez Christian Owens Jack Delamitraux (Woodhull) Cully Symington Giorgio Angelini Andy Herod

Bishop Allen is an American indie rock band founded Brooklyn, New York, and currently based in Kingston. The band's core members are Justin Rice and Christian Rudder, who are supported both on stage and in the studio by a rotating cast of musical collaborators. The band was formed in 2003 and grew out of Rice and Rudder's friendship; it takes its name from Bishop Allen Drive in Cambridge, Massachusetts, named for Bishop Richard Allen, where the two lived together after attending Harvard University.

Bishop Allen has released four albums and 12 EPs; their second album, The Broken String, was released in July 2007, Grrr..., was released in March 2009, and after a five-year hiatus they released their most recent album Lights Out in August 2014.

== History ==
=== Pre-Bishop Allen ===
Rice and Rudder attended Harvard University, where they were DJs on WHRB's punk/indie program, Record Hospital. While enrolled in the same English course, they struck up a conversation in class after seeing each other at a Jawbreaker show. The two formed a hardcore punk band called The Pissed Officers and self-released two split records with the then Boston-based Casio-core duo Gerty Farish. Rudder also played briefly in a Devo tribute band with members of Gerty Farish and Fat Day. After The Pissed-Officers broke up, Justin and Christian formed a band called Depeche Mode. "The other Depeche Mode seemed long gone at the time," Rice said, "so we figured the name was up for grabs." After the real Depeche Mode came back, the band became Bishop Allen. Some years later, Rudder and Rice took up residence at a house in Lynchburg, Virginia with Kate Dollenmayer where they began to record the music for their first album as Bishop Allen.

=== Charm School ===
Charm School was Bishop Allen's first record. Recorded in fits and starts over two years, it grew song-by-song as Rice and Rudder wrote and played in their spare time. They recorded all the instruments on the album's 13 songs themselves, using drum loops to hide the fact that neither is a drummer, and almost everything on the record was recorded one track at a time in an ordinary bedroom. Backing vocals by Bonnie Schiff-Glenn and Kate Dollenmayer and supplementary drums by Coll Anderson, all added in the album's final stages, completed the songs.

After the album was finished, Ms. Schiff-Glenn and Margaret Miller were recruited to play with Bishop Allen live, and their pictures were then featured on Charm School's back cover. Jack Delamitraux and Christian Owens later joined the band on the tours supporting Charm School's release.

The record came out in May 2003 and received many favorable reviews, most notably from Rolling Stone and NPR's Weekend Edition. The album was released under the band's own Champagne School imprint.

=== The EP project ===
In 2006, Bishop Allen recorded and released an EP every month of the year. Each record was titled for the month of its release (January, February, and so on), and, with the exception of August, which was a 14-song live disc, each contained four new studio songs.

The project began when Rice and Rudder stumbled upon a discarded piano, dragged it into their rehearsal studio and, refreshed by the sounds the keyboard added to their repertoire, put their old works-in-progress aside and began writing new songs. They soon began recording this new material, and by the time the January EP was completed on January 25, 2006, they had decided on doing one each month for the rest of the year. The January EP begins with the song "Corazon", celebrating the rescue of the piano, and features a piano on the cover.

All 12 EPs were self-released and sold primarily through the band's website. The covers of the EPs, which reflect the homespun aesthetic of the music inside, were designed by Darbie Nowatka, who also sang lead vocal on a few recordings and became an official member of the band in September 2006.

Bishop Allen collaborated with many musicians over the year, including the above-mentioned Delamitraux and Owens, Jon Natchez, and Kelly Pratt. Cully Symington began playing with the band in September and has become their regular drummer.

"History of Excuses" from the March EP was used in an episode ("My Turf War") of NBC's Scrubs. "A Tiny Fold" from the May EP was used in the April 28, 2008, episode of ABC Family's Greek.

=== The Broken String ===
In November 2006, Bishop Allen signed to Dead Oceans, a new sister label to Secretly Canadian and Jagjaguwar. They began recording a new record that January, at Blackwatch Studios in Norman, Oklahoma, and delivered it two months later. The album, Bishop Allen & The Broken String, was Bishop Allen's first true studio recording and was released by Dead Oceans on July 24, 2007. It includes nine re-recordings of songs from the EP project, as well as three new songs.

=== Lights Out ===
In July 2013, Darbie Nowatka and Rice announced a new Bishop Allen album was underway. Recording finished on December 2, 2013, in upstate New York. Dead Ocean and Bishop Allen announced the album's release for August 19, 2014, and the lead single, "Start Again," which was released on May 29, 2014.

=== Other projects ===
Rice and Rudder's roommate at the Cambridge apartment that gave the band its name was Andrew Bujalski, the film director, and they have both starred in his films.

Rudder played the male lead, Alex, in Bujalski's first film, 2002's Funny Ha Ha, and Rice starred in Mutual Appreciation, in which his character, Allen, fronts a band called the Bumblebees and plays a Bishop Allen song on-screen. Rice also stars in an indie film released in 2008 called Let Them Chirp Awhile, written and directed by Jonathan Blitstein. The band appeared in the 2008 film adaptation of Nick and Norah's Infinite Playlist.

Rice and Darbie Nowatka formed a musical side project, The Last Names, in 2011; they are releasing a free cover song every week through 2012 in advance of a full-length album.

=== In the media ===
- "Click, Click, Click, Click" (from The Broken String) was featured in the movie No Strings Attached, in the movie Sleepwalk with Me, in an episode of the short-lived CW sitcom Aliens in America, in an episode of college drama/comedy Greek, and in a Sony camera ad. It is also featured as the song played during the credits in Burton Snowboards' 2010 movie The B and in one of Colton Killoran's longboarding videos.
- "Middle Management" is part of the Major League Baseball 2K7 soundtrack. It is also featured in the trailer for Nick and Norah's Infinite Playlist, and the band is shown in the trailer and in the film.
- "Don't Hide Away" was featured on the episode of Chuck ("Chuck Versus The Ring: Part 2").
- "You'll Never Find My Christmas" was featured in one of Target's 2010 Christmas commercials for the season. It is also used in Hollister's 2011 Christmas playlist.
- "Things Are What You Make of Them" was featured in the movie Saved!
- "Busted Heart" and "The Magpie" were featured in the movie Private Romeo

== Discography ==
=== Studio albums ===
- Charm School (2003)
- The Broken String (2007)
- Grrr... (2009)
- Lights Out (2014)

=== Live albums ===
- Live In August (2006)

=== EPs ===
- January (2006)
- February (2006)
- March (2006)
- April (2006)
- May (2006)
- June (2006)
- July (2006)
- September (2006)
- October (2006)
- November (2006)
- December (2006)
