= David Buss =

American evolutionary psychologist (born 1953)

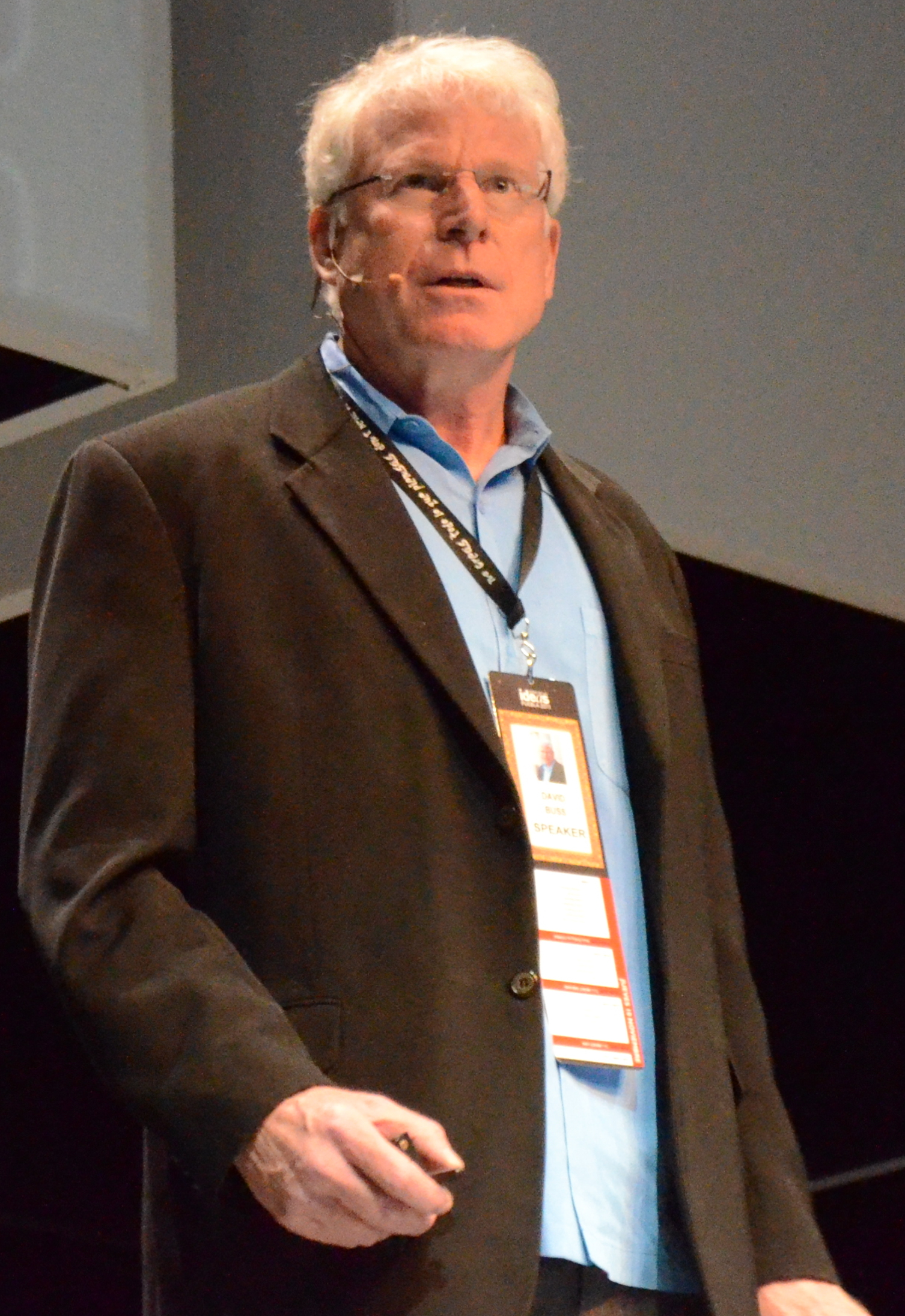
- Buss in 2011
- Born: David Michael Buss; April 14, 1953 (age 73); Indianapolis, Indiana, U.S.
- Education: University of Texas at Austin; University of California, Berkeley
- Known for: Sexual strategies theory Strategic interference theory Error management theory Homicide adaptation theory
- Scientific career
- Workplaces: Harvard University; University of Michigan; University of Texas at Austin
- Thesis: The act frequency analysis of interpersonal dispositions (1981)
- Doctoral advisor: Kenneth H. Craik
- Doctoral students: David Schmitt, Bruce Ellis, Todd Shackelford, Diana Fleischman
- Website: labs.la.utexas.edu/buss/

David Michael Buss (born April 14, 1953) is an American evolutionary psychologist at the University of Texas at Austin, researching human sex differences in mate selection. He is considered one of the founders of evolutionary psychology.

== Biography ==
Buss earned his PhD in psychology at University of California, Berkeley, in 1981. Before becoming a professor at the University of Texas, he was assistant professor for four years at Harvard University and a professor at the University of Michigan for eleven years.

The primary topics of his research include male mating strategies, conflict between the sexes, social status, social reputation, prestige, the emotion of jealousy, homicide, anti-homicide defenses, and—most recently—stalking. All of these are approached from an evolutionary perspective. Buss is the author of more than 200 scientific articles and has won many awards, including an APA Distinguished Scientific Award for Early Career Contribution to Psychology in 1988 and an APA G. Stanley Hall Lectureship in 1990.

Buss is the author of a number of publications and books, including The Evolution of Desire, The Dangerous Passion, and The Murderer Next Door, which introduces a new theory of homicide from an evolutionary perspective. He is also the author of Evolutionary Psychology: The New Science of the Mind, whose fourth edition was released in 2011. In 2005, Buss edited a reference volume, The Handbook of Evolutionary Psychology. His latest book is When Men Behave Badly: The Hidden Roots of Sexual Deception, Harassment, and Assault.

Buss is involved with extensive cross-cultural research collaborations and lectures within the U.S.

== Research ==
=== Act frequency approach ===
As a solution to these problems of defining and measuring traits (i.e. conditions that constitute a certain personality trait), Buss and K. H. Craik (1980) proposed to introduce prototype theory into personality psychology. First, a group of people is asked to list acts that a person bearing the trait in question would show. Next, a different group of people is asked to name from that list those acts that are most typical for the trait. Then the measurement is conducted by counting the number of times (within a given period of time) a proband performs the typical acts.

=== Short and long-term mating strategies ===
One element of David Buss's research involves studying the differences in mate selection between short-term and long-term mating strategies. Individuals differ in their preferences according to whether they are seeking a short or long-term mating strategy (i.e. whether they are looking for a "hook-up" or for a serious relationship). The Gangestad and Simpson Sociosexual Orientation Inventory (SOI) determines whether a person favors a short-term or long-term strategy (also termed as unrestricted and restricted). Higher SOI scores indicate a less restricted orientation, and thus a preference for a short-term mating strategy.

David Buss and colleagues conducted a study that attempted to uncover where priorities lie—concerning determinants of attractiveness—in short- and long-term mating strategies. In order to do this, participants' mating strategies were determined using the SOI, labeling each participant as favoring either a short- or a long-term mating strategy. Each individual was then given the choice to reveal either the face or body from a portrait of a person of the opposite gender. David Buss and his colleagues found that sociosexual orientation or favored mating strategy influenced which part of the portrait was revealed. Men who favored a short-term mating strategy chose to reveal the woman's body, whereas men who favored a long-term mating strategy chose to reveal the woman's face. David Buss and his colleagues found that favored mating strategies in women had no correlation with which part of the portrait was revealed but had to do with utilitarian aspects that make sense in terms of supportive and dependable resources, health and stamina. Attractiveness, from a male's perspective, seems to be based on facial cues when seeking a long-term relationship, and bodily cues when seeking a short-term relationship because they cue healthiness and reproductive capacity. They also found men showed more retardation in long term mating strategy than women and in short term strategy for women, their individuality, perceptions of benefit and demand of mate switching influenced. These findings add to David Buss's field of research by demonstrating differences in mating strategies across preferred relationship type.

=== Sex differences ===
Buss posits that males and females have faced different adaptive challenges throughout human history, which shape behavioral difference in males and females today. Females have faced the challenges of surviving through pregnancy and lactation and then rearing children. Males, by contrast, have faced the challenges of paternity uncertainty, with its related risk of misallocating parental resources, and of maximizing the offspring onto which they pass their genes. Because insemination can occur by any mating choice of the female, males cannot be certain that the child in which they are investing is genetically their offspring.

To solve the female adaptation dilemma, females select mates who are loyal and are willing and able to invest in her and her offspring by providing resources and protection. Historically, females who were less selective of mates suffered lower reproductive success and survival. Males solve the adaptation challenge of paternity uncertainty and resources misallocation by selecting sexually faithful mates. To maximize their offspring, males have adopted a short-term mating strategy of attracting and impregnating many fertile mates rather than one long-term mate.

David Buss supported this evolutionary reasoning with research focused on sex differences in mating strategies. In a large cross-cultural study that included 10,047 individuals across 37 cultures, Buss sought first to determine the different characteristics each sex looks for in a mate. From these findings, Buss was able to hypothesize the evolutionary causes for these preference differences. Buss found that males place very high importance on youth. Because youthful appearances signal fertility and males seek to maximize their number of mates capable of passing on their genes, males place high value on fertility cues. Buss also found that females desire older mates. He later hypothesized that this is because older males tend to have a greater chance of higher social status; this social status could lead to more resources for a female and her offspring, and could therefore increase a female's likelihood of sexual success and reproduction.

Another area in which the two sexes seem to differ greatly is in their reactions to sexual and emotional infidelity. Buss found that females were more jealous of emotional infidelity while males were more jealous of sexual infidelity. This has been supported as universal norm by Buss's cross-cultural study. Buss hypothesized that females find emotional infidelity more threatening because it could lead to the female losing the resources she had gained from that mate and having to raise children on her own. He then hypothesized that males found sexual infidelity more threatening because they could risk spending resources on a child that may not be their own.

=== Mate preferences ===
Buss has conducted numerous studies comparing the mate preferences of individuals by factors such as gender, time, parents vs. offspring, and type of relationship. He has also conducted a large study investigating universal mate preferences. He and Chang, Shackelford, and Wang examined a sample from China and discovered that men more than women tend to prefer traits related to fertility, such as youth and physical attractiveness. Men also desired traits that could be seen as feminine stereotypes, including skill as a housekeeper. A similar study conducted in the US by Perilloux, Fleischman, and Buss revealed the same, with the addition of the desire for the traits healthy, easygoing, and creative/artistic. Women, however, favor traits related to resources, such as good earning capacity, social status, education and intelligence, and ambition and industriousness. Women also favor, more than men, the traits kindness and understanding, sociability, dependability, emotional stability, and an exciting personality. Parents of sons similarly ranked physical attractiveness at higher importance than parents of daughters, and parents of daughters ranked good earning capacity and education at higher importance. Overall, these sex differences in mate preferences appear to reflect gender stereotypes as well as theories of evolutionary psychology, which state that men will prefer fertility to pass on their genes, while women will prefer resources to provide for a family.

Even though both are motivated by the need to pass on their genes, parents often have different preferences in mates for their kids than the kids have for their own mates. Offspring tended to rank physically attractive and exciting personality higher than their parents, while parents found religious, kind and understanding, and good earning capacity to be more important factors. Parents and daughters in particular differed in that parents also ranked good housekeeper, healthy, and good heredity higher than their daughters. The authors speculated that health was more important to parents because concerns about health problems tend to increase later in life. Parents also consistently ranked religion at a higher priority than their children, reflecting the idea that parents want in-laws with similar values to them. Offspring, meanwhile, ranked religious very low, reflecting the lack of religiosity in younger generations.

When questioned about how his evolutionary male/female mating traits could be applied to non-reproductive sexual relationships, such as those of older, non-reproductive heterosexual couples or male–male long-term gay relationships, Keith W. Swain, PsyD, retired, conducted a research project seeking the answer to this question. In 2006, Swain conducted a matched-pair online survey of 1,000 self-identified gay male couples, asking each member of the couple to identify which of Buss's male and female mating traits they identified as being a trait they had historically had and had employed in their mate selection process.

Swain's results indicated that Buss's mate selection traits could be used to accurately predict the nature of the reporting couple's current relationships status: classified in four opposing groups, (those couples where both partners identified their relationship as either happy or unhappy, combative or peaceful, exciting or boring, and respectful or disrespectful). In addition, Swain's research noted a statistically-significant ability to predict the length of time a relationship a specific relationship had existed. As Buss's research would lead one to expect, those gay couples that had been together for five years or longer, when both partners rated their relationships as happy, displayed a remarkable similarity to heterosexual couples' use of sex-specific mating traits. One partner, identified as the alpha member by Swain, displayed more traditional male mating traits, while the other partner, identified as the beta partner by Swain, displayed stronger female-style mating traits. Swain's research was the basis for the best-selling book, Dynamic Duos: The Alpha/Beta Key to Unlocking Success in Gay Relationships.

=== Emotional distress towards intersexual deception ===
David Buss's research also explores the differing ways in which men and women cope with intersexual deception. His Strategic Interference Theory (SIT) states that conflict occurs when the strategies enacted by one individual interfere with the strategies, goals, and desires of another. Buss found that anger and distress are the two primary emotions that have evolved as solutions to strategic interference between men and women. When a person's goals, desires, and strategies are compromised, their aroused anger and subjective distress serve four functions: (1) to draw attention to the interfering events, (2) to mark those events for storage in long-term memory, (3) to motivate actions that reduce or eliminate the source of strategic interference, and (4) to motivate memorial retrieval and, hence, subsequent avoidance of situations producing further interference. In this manner, SIT implies that anger and distress will be activated when a person is confronted with an event that interferes with their favored sexual strategy. The source of interference will differ between the sexes, as men and women display different sexual strategies.

Buss and colleagues have found that SIT helps in predicting emotional arousal with respect to mating deception. These predictions can be made in regards to various scenarios that often occur between men and women. The research facilitated by Buss and colleagues shows that women, in comparison to men, will display more emotional distress when they have been deceived about their partner's socioeconomic status, when their partners deploy expressions of love as a short-term mating strategy, when their partners display postcopulatory signals of disinterest in pursuing a long-term relationship, and when their partners conceal their existing emotional investment in another person. Men, more than women, will become emotionally distressed when their partners present false invitations for sex as a long-term mating strategy, when their partner displays sexual infidelity in the context of a long-term relationship, and when their partners lie about the content of their sexual fantasies.

=== Mate poaching and guarding ===
Schmitt & Buss in 2001 defined mate poaching as a behavior designed to lure someone who is already in a romantic relationship, either temporarily for a brief sexual liaison or more permanently for a long-term mating. In empirical studies men showed higher propensity in mate poaching than women. Tactics involved befriending, waiting for an opportunity, driving a wedge in existing relationship, etc.

Mate guarding is a co-evolution strategy designed to defend against poaching. Jealousy and guesstimation are identified indicators of this guarding strategy. Among men, expressed sexual infidelity of their mate was the most damaging, while women expressed emotional infidelity as the most damaging. Men perceived borderline paternity issues. In contrast, women can always be certain that their offspring are their own. Mate retention tactics among men mainly involved vigilance and violence; among women, it mainly consisted of enhancing their physical appearance and intentionally provoking their mate's jealousy with suggestibility an object/stimulus is a threat to their valued relationship and challenge status hierarchy with changes in attachment.

== Books ==
- Buss, D.M. (1995). The Evolution of Desire: Strategies of Human Mating. Basic Books. ISBN 978-0-465-02143-7.
- Buss, D.M.; Malamuth, N. (1996). Sex, Power, Conflict: Evolutionary and Feminist Perspectives. Oxford University Press. ISBN 978-0-19-510357-1.
- Buss, D.M. (2000). The Dangerous Passion: Why Jealousy Is as Necessary as Love and Sex. The Free Press. ISBN 0-684-85081-8.
- Buss, D.M., ed. (2005). The Handbook of Evolutionary Psychology. Wiley. ISBN 978-0-471-26403-3.
- Buss, D.M. (2005). The Murderer Next Door: Why the Mind Is Designed to Kill. The Penguin Press. ISBN 1-59420-043-2.
- Meston, C.M.; Buss, D.M. (2009). Why Women Have Sex: Understanding Sexual Motivations from Adventure to Revenge. Times Books. ISBN 978-0-8050-8834-2.
- Larsen, R.; Buss, D.M. (2017). Personality Psychology: Domains of Knowledge About Human Nature (6th ed.). McGraw-Hill Education. ISBN 978-1-259-87049-1.
- Buss, D.M. (2019). Evolutionary Psychology: The New Science of the Mind (6th ed.). Routledge. ISBN 978-1-138-08818-4.
- Buss, D.M. (2021). When Men Behave Badly: The Hidden Roots of Sexual Deception, Harassment, and Assault. Little, Brown Spark. ISBN 978-0316419352.
