= Bruce J. Ellis =

American psychologist

- Education: California Polytechnic State University; University of Michigan
- Known for: Child development Psychological stress
- Awards: American Psychological Association's George A. Miller Award for an Outstanding Recent Article on General Psychology (2010)
- Scientific career
- Fields: Developmental psychology Evolutionary psychology
- Workplaces: University of Arizona; University of Utah
- Thesis: Investment in dating relationships (1995)
- Doctoral advisor: David Buss

Bruce Joel Ellis is an American evolutionary developmental psychologist and professor in the Department of Psychology at the University of Utah. He is known for his research on the positive psychological effects of children's exposure to psychological stress. Of this research, he told the Atlantic in 2017 that "We’re not arguing that stress is good, or that it’s good for kids to grow up in poverty or under harsh conditions. What we’re arguing is that [the detrimental effects of stress] are real, and that’s half the story." He has also researched how the timing of puberty among young girls can be influenced by the environment in which they are raised, and by whether they are raised by single mothers.
