= Ho-Ag =

Rock band

- Origin: Boston, Massachusetts, United States
- Genres: Noise rock
- Years active: 2001 – present
- Members: Matt Parish; Tyler Derryberry; Alaskan Ryan Brown; Eric Meyer
- Past members: Kristina Johnson; Patrick Kim; Dave Dines; Jonathan Ruhe; Nicholas ("Nkls") Ward
- Website: ho-agband.com

Ho-Ag was an experimental noise rock band based in Boston, Massachusetts.

== History ==
Ho-Ag was formed in 2001 by guitarists Matt Parish and Patrick Kim, along with bassist Dave Dines and drummer Jon Ruhe. Their debut EP, People Coming Back in Time, was self-released in October 2002. Their first album was later released in 2003 on Mister Records. The group then replaced Ruhe with Eric Meyer and Tyler Derryberry joined the group as a keyboardist. Their EP Pray for the Worms in was released in February 2005. Nicholas Wardreplaced Dines on bass during a tour. Their next album, The Word from Pluto, was recorded after the tour and released on Hello Sir Records in September 2006. The group followed up with a self-released EP titled Elektro in 2007. Doctor Cowboy, Ho-Ag's third album, was released by Hello Sir in May 2008, by which time the lineup consisted of Parish, Derryberry, Meyer, guitarist Kristina Johnson, and bassist Ryan Brown.

== Discography ==
- The Meteor Is a Decoy (Demo, 2002)
- People Coming Back In Time for Me (Self-Released, 2002)
- Mister Records Comp 2003 (Mister Records, 2003)
- Ho Ag Equals Go At (Mister Records, 2003)
- Mister Records Comp 3.0 (Mister Records, 2005)
- Ho-Ag/Laughing Light Split 7" (Mister Records, 2005)
- Pray for the Worms (Hive 35, 2005)
- The Word from Pluto (Hello Sir Records, 2006)
- Elektra/Elektro EP (Hive 35, 2007)
- Doctor Cowboy (Hello Sir Records, 2008)
- World-Destroying Zig-Zags (Hive 35, 2013)
- No More Masterpieces (Hive 35, 2013)

== Reception ==
Their album The Word from Pluto received positive to mixed reviews.
