= Agroar Carga Aérea =

Portuguese airline

IATA	ICAO	Call sign
-	GRR	-
- Founded: 1992
- Ceased operations: 2011
- Destinations: Evora, Funchal and Lisbon
- Headquarters: Évora, Portugal
- Website: https://web.archive.org/web/20080314203636/http://www.agroar.pt/

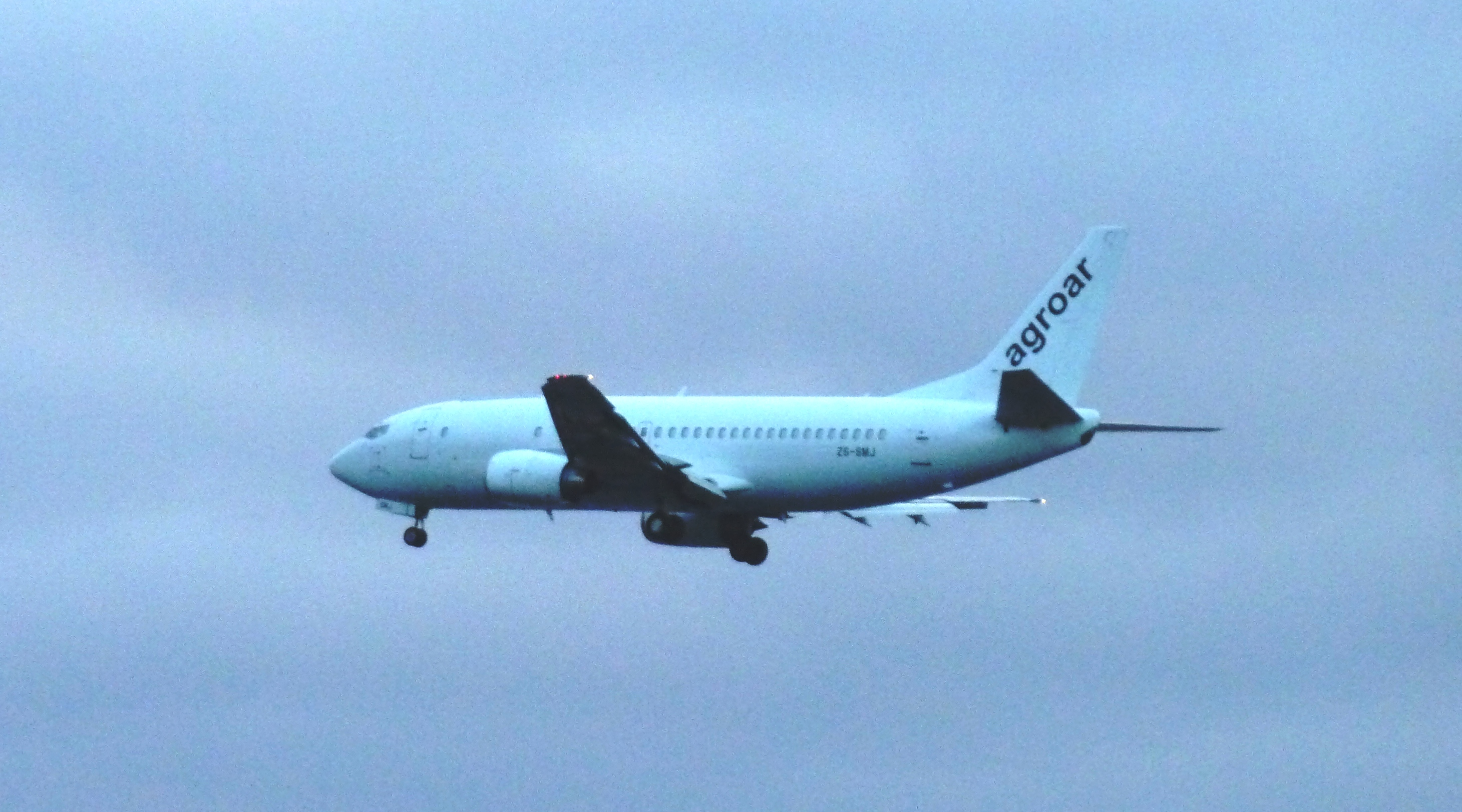
Agroar Carga Aérea Boeing 737-300

Agroar Carga Aérea was a cargo airline based in Portugal. Having originally been specialized on agricultural aviation, Agroar launched commercial airline business with cargo flights between Lisbon and Funchal, using a Boeing 737-300 jet aircraft, which was owned by Flyant.

Agroar also offered aviation-related services like the launching of paratroopers, firefighting, and sightseeing and event flights, as well as aircraft maintenance.
