= Dataclysm =

Book by Christian Rudder

- First edition (publ. Crown Publishing)
- Author: Christian Rudder
- Publisher: Crown Publishing
- Publication date: September 9, 2014
- ISBN: 978-0-38-534737-2

Dataclysm: Who We Are (When We Think No One's Looking) is a book by OkCupid founder Christian Rudder that discusses how the vast trove of aggregated online data about individuals helps explain everything from political beliefs to speech patterns. Much of the book details his findings after mining his own dataset in OkCupid.

Dataclysm was nominated for the Goodreads Choice Award for Nonfiction.
