= Charm School (Bishop Allen album) =

Studio album by Bishop Allen
- Released: May 6, 2003
- Recorded: March 2001 – Aug 29, 2002
- Genre: Indie rock
- Length: 38:53
- Label: Champagne School
- Producers: Justin Rice, Christian Rudder

Bishop Allen chronology
Charm School (2003)	The Broken String (2007)

Professional ratings
Review scores
Source	Rating
AllMusic	4/5 stars
Rolling Stone	4/5 stars

Charm School is the first album by the indie rock group Bishop Allen released in 2003 on the band's own Champagne School "label".

== Track listing ==
1. "Charm School" – 2:08
2. "Little Black Ache" – 2:47
3. "Busted Heart" – 3:54
4. "Bishop Allen Drive" – 2:56
5. "Eve of Destruction" – 3:36
6. "Things Are What You Make of Them" – 3:57
7. "Ghosts Are Good Company" – 3:01
8. "Empire City" – 2:42
9. "Coupla Easy Things" – 2:22
10. "Penitentiary Bound" – 1:57
11. "Quarter to Three" – 3:21
12. "Another Wasted Night" – 2:32
13. "Things Are What You Make of Them (Reprise)" – 3:36

The track "Eve of Destruction" is partly based on P. F. Sloan's well-known song of the same name. "Little Black Ache" is partially based on The Nightcrawlers' song "Little Black Egg". "Charm School" is partly based on the Hank Williams' song "I'm So Lonesome I Could Cry", and "Things Are What You Make Of Them" is partially based on The Association's "Never My Love".

== Reception ==
Charm School received an overwhelmingly positive reception upon its release. One CD Baby reviewer described the album as "feelgood music", and another described it as "charming." Rolling Stone described the album as "If Modest Mouse spent a year in a Chuck E. Cheese ball pit". They go on to compliment the backing vocals of Bonnie.

== Reissue ==
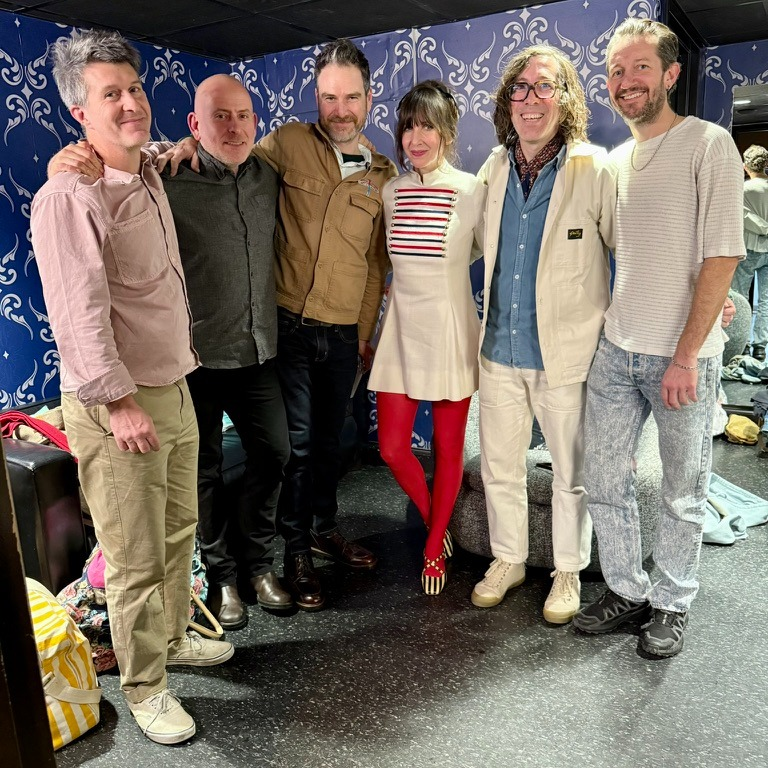
Taken January 15th, 2026. From left to right: Christian Rudder, Jon Natchez, Jack Delamitraux, Darbie Nowatka, Justin Rice, Michael Tapper

In August 2025, Bishop Allen announced on their Facebook page that there were big things coming. This was the first announcement from the band since the October 2014 tour ended. In January 2026, it was announced that Charm School would be re-issued on vinyl and be available at the five reunion shows they were doing. It was repeatedly stated that these would not be available after the shows.

== Tour ==
The band had already begun to tour by the time Charm School was released. Their first live performance was on October 27th, 2002. In May 2003, after the Charm School booklet had been printed, Margaret Miller decided to leave the band to focus on her career in children's publishing. She is now a speech-language pathologist for the American Institute for Stuttering. After the band's first tour, Bonnie Karin also decided to leave the band to become a 2nd grade teacher. They were replaced by friends of the band Jack Delamitraux (or Woodhull) on drums and Christian Owens (C.O.) on bass. C.O. would be with the band until early 2006, and Jack was with the band until early 2007.

== Clementines ==
In November 2003, the band began to work on the follow-up to Charm School. They began to record demos, which attracted the attention of the Polyvinyl Record Co. label. They had a close friendship with Polyvinyl signee Mates of State, touring with them in 2004. Bishop Allen would wind up on the Polyvinyl 2005 Sampler, with the track People You Meet. This is the only officially released studio recording to feature C.O. on bass and backing vocals. After this, the band began to record more demos, and continued to perform live. At some point before April 2005, a portion of these demos were leaked to the internet, because the index page of the site was deleted and anyone was able to browse the site's directories for files. This leak, along with another leak later in the year, caused the band to decide not to release the album. Most of the songs were re-worked into tracks on the EP project.
