= Major Labels =

2021 book by Kelefa Sanneh

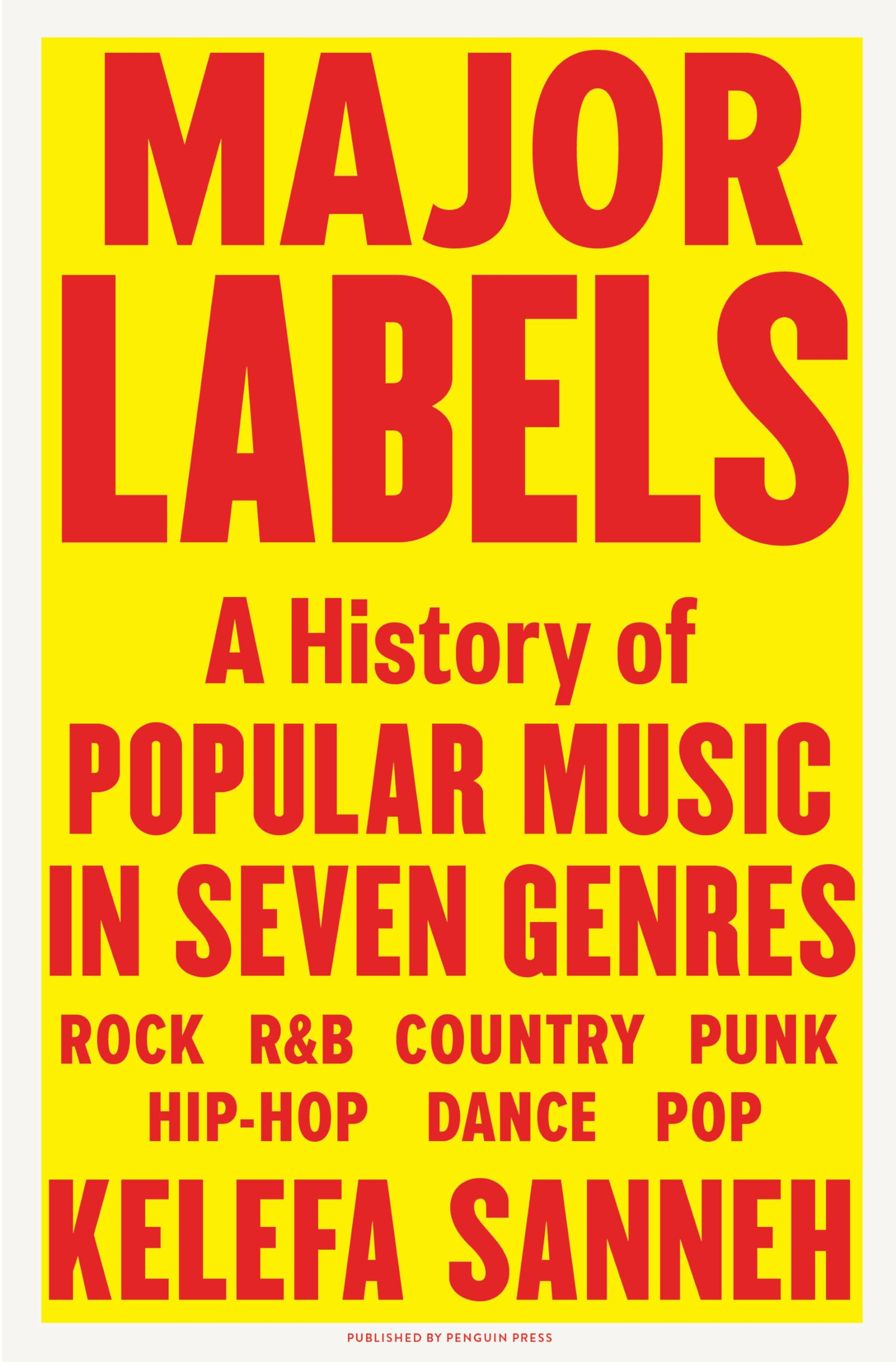
- Author: Kelefa Sanneh
- Language: English
- Subject: Music genres
- Genre: Non-fiction
- Publisher: Penguin Books (US) Canongate Books (UK)
- Publication date: October 5, 2021
- Pages: 496
- ISBN: 978-0-525-55959-7
- OCLC: 1309664374
- Dewey Decimal: 781.64
- LC Class: ML3470 .S25 2021

Major Labels: A History of Popular Music in Seven Genres is a 2021 non-fiction book written by the music critic and journalist Kelefa Sanneh. Sanneh had largely moved away from music criticism after joining the staff of The New Yorker in 2008, but felt compelled to explore music again after realizing that he was "still obsessed" with it. The book contains seven chapters, each of which focus on the history of a different music genre from the 1970s onward; the book also contains several autobiographical stories interspersed within the chapters. Major Labels received generally positive reviews from critics, and appeared on several listicles regarding the best music books of 2021.

== Background and publication ==
Kelefa Sanneh is a music critic and journalist, who has prominently written for publications like The New York Times and The New Yorker. In 2004, Sanneh wrote "The Rap Against Rockism" for The New York Times, which Jack Hamilton of The Atlantic called an "influential rumination on genre". After joining the staff of The New Yorker in 2008, Sanneh moved away from music criticism and mainly wrote about topics unrelated to music. Later, Sanneh noted how he "realized [he] was still obsessed" with music, and became interested in exploring it again. Major Labels was published on October 5, 2021 through Penguin Press in the United States and through Canongate Books in the United Kingdom. An audiobook version, narrated by Sanneh, was also released that year.

== Content ==
Major Labels is a book covering the histories of seven music genres: rock, R&B, country, punk, hip-hop, dance, and pop; the book begins with an introduction, followed by seven chapters each broken up into ten-to-twelve sections. While writing Major Labels, Sanneh noted how he would continuously do research and listen to music in order to present each genre as a "story" with a plot. Jonah Raskin of the New York Journal of Books noticed how the book primarily focuses on the history of music from the 1970s onward, suggesting that the music from before that point was "not his era and there have already been tons written about it". Additionally, Major Labels contains several autobiographical stories, which per Jack Hamilton of The Atlantic "allow Sanneh to explore his own still-evolving relationship to music".

The chapter on rock music comments on how songs in the genre became "repertory music", and how the genre faded from prominence. The chapters on R&B and country focus on the relationship between the genres and race. The chapter on punk contains memoir-like elements regarding Sanneh's relationship with the genre, and how he was "forced to reckon with some of [its] inconsistencies". In an interview with Pitchfork, Sanneh explained that he decided against combining the chapters on rock and punk due to the unique ethos behind the latter genre, separate from its sound. In the chapter on hip-hop, Sanneh called it the "quintessential American art form", but expressed concerns about sexism in the genre. The chapter on dance music focuses on the evolution of the genre from disco to electronic dance music. Finally, the chapter on pop music focuses on the "notions of authenticity" within the genre. Hamilton observed how a primary theme of Major Labels was how other people could shape the genres which a person associates themselves with.

== Reception ==
Major Labels received generally positive reviews from critics, with both Kirkus Reviews and Publishers Weekly giving the book a starred review. The memoir elements of Major Labels received particular critical praise. Sean O'Hagan of The Observer commented how the more-personal elements brought about a "compelling exploration of belonging and identity through music", and Raskin wrote how it justified Sanneh's credibility. However, the encyclopedic treatment of genres received a more negative reception: O'Hagan called the historical aspects "frustrating" in contrast to the "personal resonance" from the memoir and critical overview parts of the book, while Dwight Garner of The New York Times found the book "generic" and compared it to a "Ken Burns-style history lesson". Major Labels appeared on several listicles regarding the best music books of 2021, including the lists of The Guardian, NME, Pitchfork, and Variety.
