= Tiny Hawks =

- Origin: Providence, Rhode Island, United States
- Genres: Indie rock, Hardcore
- Years active: 2003–2008
- Labels: Corleone Records; Moganono Records
- Past members: Art Middleton; Gus Martin

Tiny Hawks was an American hardcore punk rock duo from Providence, Rhode Island, United States, composed of Art Middleton (guitar) and Gus Martin (drums, double bass).

== History ==
The band formed early in 2003 and played their first show in The Bakery warehouse in Olneyville, Rhode Island in May of that year. Tiny Hawks released their debut 8 song EP/12" Fingers Become Bridges in 2005 on Corleone Records and Moganono Records. It received a review from Exclaim!, which described it as an "energetic record" and noted, "Distorted riffs, post-punk fuzz and hints of math-rock shape the sound of Fingers Become Bridges CD." Their subsequent full-length People Without End was released in 2006. They disbanded when Gus started have medical issues that limited his drumming.

Tiny Hawks' musical style combines elements of math rock and noise rock as well as DC-influenced hardcore punk (Rites of Spring, Cap'n Jazz, Assfactor 4) and 1990s thrash (Palatka, In/Humanity). Their contemporaries include Sinaloa, Fiya, Daniel Striped Tiger, Ampere, Halo Perfecto, and Death to Tyrants. In 2005 and 2006, the duo performed at North East Sticks Together.

== Members ==
- Art Middleton - guitar, vocals
- Gus Martin - drums, vocals, bass

== Discography ==
Year	Album details
2005	Fingers Become Bridges: Released: May 23, 2005; Labels: Corleone Records, Moganono Records
2006	People Without End: Released: August 13, 2006; Labels: Corleone Records
