= Grrr... =

Studio album by Bishop Allen
- Released: March 10, 2009
- Genre: Indie rock
- Length: 35:42
- Label: Dead Oceans

Bishop Allen chronology
The Broken String (2007)	Grrr... (2009)	Lights Out (2014)

Professional ratings
Review scores
Source	Rating
The A.V. Club	(B)
NME	(5/10)
Pitchfork Media	(3.5/10)
The Skinny	2/5 stars

Grrr... is the third full-length album by the indie rock group Bishop Allen. It was released on March 10, 2009. It is the follow-up to their 2007 album, The Broken String.

== Track listing ==
1. "Dimmer" – 2:46
2. "The Lion & the Teacup" – 3:01
3. "South China Moon" – 3:03
4. "Dirt on Your New Shoes" – 2:43
5. "Oklahoma" – 3:06
6. "The Ancient Commonsense of Things" – 3:13
7. "True or False" – 2:39
8. "Rooftop Brawl" – 2:55
9. "Shanghaied" – 2:33
10. "Don't Hide Away" – 2:26
11. "Cue the Elephants" – 2:39
12. "The Magpie" – 1:46
13. "Tiger, Tiger" – 3:03
