= Grrrrrrrrrrr!! =

Painting by Roy Lichtenstein

- Artist: Roy Lichtenstein
- Year: 1965
- Movement: Pop art
- Dimensions: 172.7 cm × 142.5 cm (68.0 in × 56.1 in)
- Location: Solomon R. Guggenheim Museum, New York City

Grrrrrrrrrrr!! is a 1965 oil and Magna on canvas painting by Roy Lichtenstein. Measuring 68 in × 56.125 in (172.7 cm × 142.6 cm), it was bequeathed to the Solomon R. Guggenheim Museum collection from Lichtenstein's estate. It depicts a head-on representation of an angry dog growling with the onomatopoeic expression "Grrrrrrrrrrr!!". The work was derived from Our Fighting Forces, which also served as the source for other military dog paintwork by Lichtenstein.

== Background ==
Grrrrrrrrrrr!!'s source for its narrative content is Our Fighting Forces Number 66 (February 1962).

The Lichtenstein Foundation notes that the inspiration for this painting is a frame of Our Fighting Forces #66 (February 1962), which was published by National Periodical Publications (now DC Comics). In that frame only a portion of the dog's head is visible and the speech balloon says "Grrrrr!" In addition to the painting itself, Lichtenstein produced a small 5.75 in × 4.5 in (14.6 cm × 11.4 cm) graphite on paper study.

The painting was bestowed to the Guggenheim Museum after Lichtenstein's 1997 death, following a promise made in 1992. The museum used Grrrrrrrrrrr!! in the promotional posters for the 1993 exhibition "Roy Lichtenstein: A Retrospective", which ran from October 7, 1993 to January 16, 1994. Other notable exhibitions where this work was shown include "Rendezvous: Masterpieces from the Centre Georges Pompidou and the Guggenheim Museums" which ran from October 16, 1998 to January 24, 1999, at the Guggenheim Museum in New York, as well as "Art in America: 300 Years of Innovation" which traveled to several museums in China between 2007 and 2008. The work appeared on the cover of the November 1993 issue of ARTnews.

== Details ==
Although Grrrrrrrrrrr!! is derived from what Guggenheim Senior Curator Susan Davidson calls a "low-grade comic strip" that is a typical Lichtenstein source, it is representative of Lichtenstein's fascination with "the atomic language of Ben-Day dots, black outlines and the three primary colors as the elementary vocabulary of low-budget commercial imagery."

According to Jennifer Blessing of the Guggenheim, "There is also an element of humor in creating fine art out of what has customarily been considered 'low,' a playfulness that is equally evident in the onomatopoeic caption and bellicose expression of the dog in Grrrrrrrrrrr!!"

== Related works ==
In 1962, Lichtenstein created Arrrrrff!, an oil and graphite pencil on canvas painting depicting a dog from a subsequent issue of Our Fighting Forces, the series that was the source of Grrrrrrrrrrr!! That source depicts the dog by the name of "Pooch" in profile with a text bubble reading "Sniff--Sniff--Sniff--Sniff--Arrrrrff!" above his head. The inspiration for this painting came from Our Fighting Forces #69 (July 1962). Arrrrrff! was sold at Christie's in 1996 for $420,500 to an undisclosed buyer.

== See also ==
- 1965 in art
