= Sociosexual Orientation Inventory =

Self-report questionnaire

The Sociosexual Orientation Inventory (SOI-R) is a 9-item self-report questionnaire designed to measure individuals differences in the tendency to have casual, uncommitted sexual relationships. This tendency, termed sociosexuality or sociosexual orientation, is divided into three facets measured by the inventory: behavior (in terms of number of casual and changing sex partners), attitude (towards uncommitted sex) and desire (for people not in a romantic relationship). The most recent revision is from 2008.

== History ==
Sociosexuality as a concept was introduced by Alfred Kinsey to describe differences in individuals tendency to engage in uncommitted sexual relationships.

Minimal research was done until interest in the topic markedly increased when Gangestad and Simpson released their 5-item Sociosexual Orientation Inventory in 1991. However, serious problems were found with the original scale with respect to sociosexuality as a single dimension, its sometimes low internal consistency, skewed score distribution, and one question inapplicable to singles. It was these concerns that led Penke and Asendorpf to create the SOI-R to deal with these issues.

There currently exist two variations on the SOI-R currently available in 25 languages, a 9-point response scale for integration with the original Gangestad and Simpson SOI and a 5-point response scale for the majority of subjects. The language versions include Czech, English, Hungarian, or Polish.

== Findings ==
Significant sex differences have been found between men and women on the scale, with a significantly larger correlation between the attitude and behavior facets of the SOI-R in women compared to men (proposed to be due to lower opportunity for behavior). There were pronounced sex differences in desire, mediocre differences for attitude (with men scoring higher than women) no differences in behavior in heterosexual test-takers.

Improving on the previous Gangestad and Simpson Sociosexuality scale, the three factors appeared to make unique contributions and have discriminant validity. Desire made unique contributions to the prediction of past sexual and relationship behaviors, observer-rated attractiveness, self-perceived mate value, and male and female flirting behavior, as well as having links with sex drive and relationship quality. Attitude appears responsible for the effect of sociosexuality on mate preferences, assortative mating, and romantic partner's flirtatiousness outside the relationship. Evening-oriented females (but not males) were more unrestricted in behavior, attitude, and desire.

== See also ==
- Mating system
- Monogamy
- Polygamy
- Promiscuity
