= Fat Day =

US musical group from Cambridge, MA, USA

Fat Monkey Day
- Origin: Cambridge, Massachusetts
- Genres: Noise rock, indie rock, chimp rock
- Years active: 1992–2005
- Labels: 100% Breakfast!, Methodist Leisure Inc., Donut Friends, Devour Records, HG Fact, Wabana, Ratfish, Load, Dark Beloved Cloud
- Members: Arik Grier; Doug Demay; Matt Pakulski; Zak Sitter

Fat Day was a Boston-based noisecore band. Formed in Cambridge, Massachusetts in 1992, they released a handful of LPs and several EPs on their own 100% Breakfast! label as well as many others.

== History ==
The four members of Fat Day met in the early 1990s when they were DJs on the Record Hospital, a nightly program of rock and indie rock aired on WHRB in Cambridge, Massachusetts. Doug Demay and Zak Sitter both played guitar in the short-lived band Mopar before dedicating their time to Fat Day. The band rented a small house in Somerville, Massachusetts (dubbed "Fat Day House") where they lived, practiced, recorded, ran a record label, and hosted shows for local and touring bands.

Fat Day toured the U.S. several times, as well as the UK and Ireland in 1997, and Japan in 1998. During the band's existence, they self-released three LPs and several EPs as well as an EP co-released with Donut Friends. Other labels that put out Fat Day records include Japan's HG Fact, Wabana, Ratfish, and the Japanese-American label Devour Records, which compiled a CD of Fat Day's first two albums. In 2002 'Fat Day 'IV' came out on Douglas Wolk's Dark Beloved Cloud label, and 2004's Unf! Unf! was issued by Providence noise label Load Records. Fat Day also released split EPs with the Ohio bands Thomas Jefferson Slave Apartments and Harriet The Spy and the Japanese band Melt-Banana.

== Creative projects ==
Fat Day's original inception as a standard guitar/bass/drums/vocals punk band has always been infused with a performance art aesthetic. They have been known to play dressed only in clear cellophane wrap or have vocalist Matt Pakulski locked inside a speaker cabinet for the entire duration of a live show. Their 1997 tour of the UK and Ireland featured a fifth "member" wearing only a pair of jockey shorts, with a toy saxophone and covered in a substance of the band's choice at every gig. This, apparently, was due to him wanting to accompany the band on the tour, and, not being able to play, the other members of the band agreed on the condition they covered him head-to-toe in a different substance for each show. The saxophone was unmiked and unplayable. Their sound on that tour was a mixture of noise, avant-punk and hardcore, frequently giving the impression of a more impenetrable The Fall attempting some of Captain Beefheart's most difficult pieces, arranged by a "The Black Saint And The Sinner Lady"-era Charles Mingus. On their 1998 tour of the U.S and Japan the band built a set of oscillators that were activated by choreographed dances on four small trampolines. These homemade electronic instruments were later condensed into a more manageable helmet form that the band would wear and play songs on in the midst of their more guitar-based set.

Fat Day recorded a soundtrack for guitarist Doug DeMay's film Sexy Doings. They have also collaborated with the comic strip illustrator PShaw! on a comic strip poster and a purple vinyl 45 RPM record set called Oskarrensaga, based on their elaborate 2002 rock opera of the same name that involved inflatable pool toys (such as swans and a curly sea serpent), and featured narration by PShaw. The album Fat Day IV is a collection of twenty-one pieces of music composed and mailed in by fans, and Iguanadonaland enlists a community orchestra that performs throughout the album.

== Break up ==
By 2005 half of Fat Day had moved away from Boston and they eventually disbanded. Guitarist Doug Demay continues to run a home recording studio and record label. Arik Grier took up sousaphone in the Stick and Rag Village Orchestra and Debo Band. Matt Pakulshi runs the Chicago-based label FPE Records.

== Members ==
- Arik Grier, bass guitar and electronics, now plays tuba in the Ethio-groove outfit Debo Band.
- Doug Demay, guitar and electronics, sang for a Devo cover band, now plays in Exusamwa.
- Matt Pakulski, vocals and electronics, majored in new music composition in college and originally played bagpipes in Fat Day.
- Zak Sitter, drums and electronics, was a founding member of DQE.

== Discography ==
=== Albums ===
- My Name Is I Hate You (1995)
- Burrega! (1997)
- Cats of the Wild (2000)
- IV (2002)
- Unf! Unf! (2004)
- Iguanadonaland (2009)

=== EPs and singles ===
- 1st 7" (1993)
- Live Poultry Fresh Killed (1994)
- Bound for Glory (1995)
- Smell Me Silly! (1996)
- Split 7" with Thomas Jefferson Slave Apartments (1997)
- Split 7" with Harriet the Spy (1998)
- Gun Court (1999)
- Poop E.P. (2002)
- Oskarrensaga (2006)
- Split CD with Melt-Banana (2007)

=== Compilation albums ===
- Burrega!/My Name Is I Hate You (1998 CD release of first two albums)
- Snarl of Pulchritude: Singles 1993-2003 (2004)

=== Compilation appearances ===
- One song on a flexidisc that came as an insert in Wingnut magazine (Sealed Hotel Publications, 1993)
- One song on The Guide To Your Demise 7" compilation (1994)
- One song on the Stealing the Pocket compilation LP (Positively Punk, 1994)
- "All Your Winning Colours" and "Dub" appear on the Methodist Leisure Inc. freebie spazzcore compilation Short Attention Span (2009, Methodist Leisure Inc.)

== Other appearances ==
Fat Day's song "Little Rachcles" is sampled on the 1999 album Planetary Natural Love Gas Webbin' 199999 by DJ Pica Pica Pica, a continuous mix of music compiled by Yamatsuka Eye. The song is incorrectly listed in the liner notes of that CD as "Burrega Theme".

== See also ==
- Record Hospital
- WHRB
