= Intrasexual competition =

Intrasexual competition may refer to:

- Female intrasexual competition
- Male intrasexual competition
