= Christian Rudder =

American entrepreneur

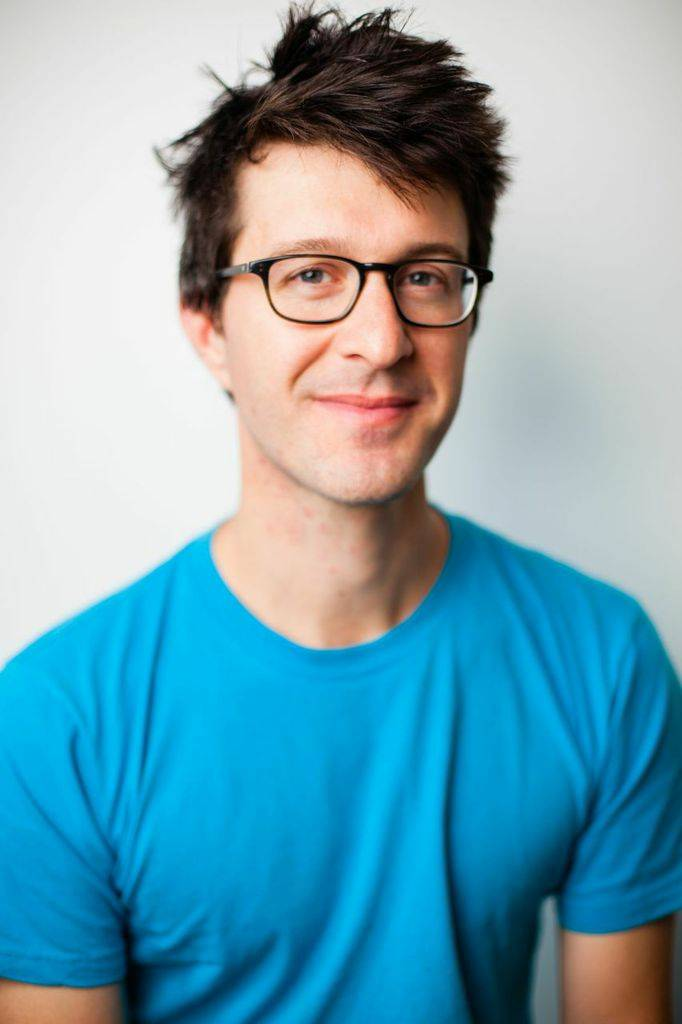
- Born: September 1, 1975 (age 51)
- Occupations: Entrepreneur, writer, musician

Christian Rudder (born September 1, 1975) is an American technology entrepreneur and writer known for co-founding the online dating service OkCupid and publishing the site's popular blog posts, which offered insights on dating based on data of user behavior. Following OkCupid's sale to the owner of Match.com in 2011, Rudder remained at the company for four years, and in 2014 published the book Dataclysm with further analysis of online dating statistics. He left OkCupid in 2015.

== Education ==
Rudder graduated from Little Rock Central High School in 1993. He attended Harvard University, graduating with a degree in mathematics in 1998.

== Career ==
Rudder joined SparkNotes in October 1999, a few months after its founding. Rudder was the creative voice of TheSpark.com, which was the viral content arm of SparkNotes during the site's early rise to popularity. He became TheSpark's creative director in March 2001. Soon after the site's sale to Barnes & Noble, Rudder began building OkCupid with SparkNotes founders Chris Coyne, Sam Yagan, and Max Krohn.

=== OkCupid and writing ===
The online dating site OkCupid launched on January 19, 2004, with Rudder and his three business partners as co-founders. Rudder focused on the front-end product and developed the site's editorial voice. From 2009 to 2011, OkCupid published statistical observations and analysis of members' preferences and connections; the blog posts were written by Rudder and gained widespread media attention. In February 2011, OkCupid was sold to IAC Inc., the owner of Match.com and other dating properties, for $90 million. Following the sale, Rudder served as president of OkCupid until he left in 2015.

=== Dataclysm book ===
Rudder expanded his writings for OkCupid into the non-fiction book Dataclysm, which became a New York Times Best Seller in September 2014 and was a finalist for the Los Angeles Times Book Prize that year in the Science & Technology category.

== Music ==
Rudder played guitar in the hardcore punk band Pissed Officers and indie rock group Bishop Allen, both with Justin Rice on bass and Rudder and Rice sharing songwriting and vocal duties. On Bishop Allen's first three albums, Rudder played most of the instruments except drums and piano. Through Bishop Allen, Rudder has contributed to the soundtracks of the movies Saved!, Sleepwalk with Me, No Strings Attached, Nick and Norah's Infinite Playlist, Bully, and several other smaller films and commercials.

== Film work ==
He appeared in Andrew Bujalski's film Funny Ha Ha, as Alex, and appeared as himself in Peter Sollett's film Nick and Norah's Infinite Playlist.

== Personal life ==
Christian met his wife, Reshma Patel, at a concert in Boston. Patel ran a public relations firm. They married in 2006 and have a daughter, Plum, together.

They lived in the Williamsburg neighborhood of New York City for some time, but moved to Costa Rica in 2020.

== Bibliography ==
Rudder, Christian (2014). Dataclysm : Who We Are When We Think No One's Looking. Crown Publishers.
