= Breast Cancer Awareness Month =

Annual health campaign

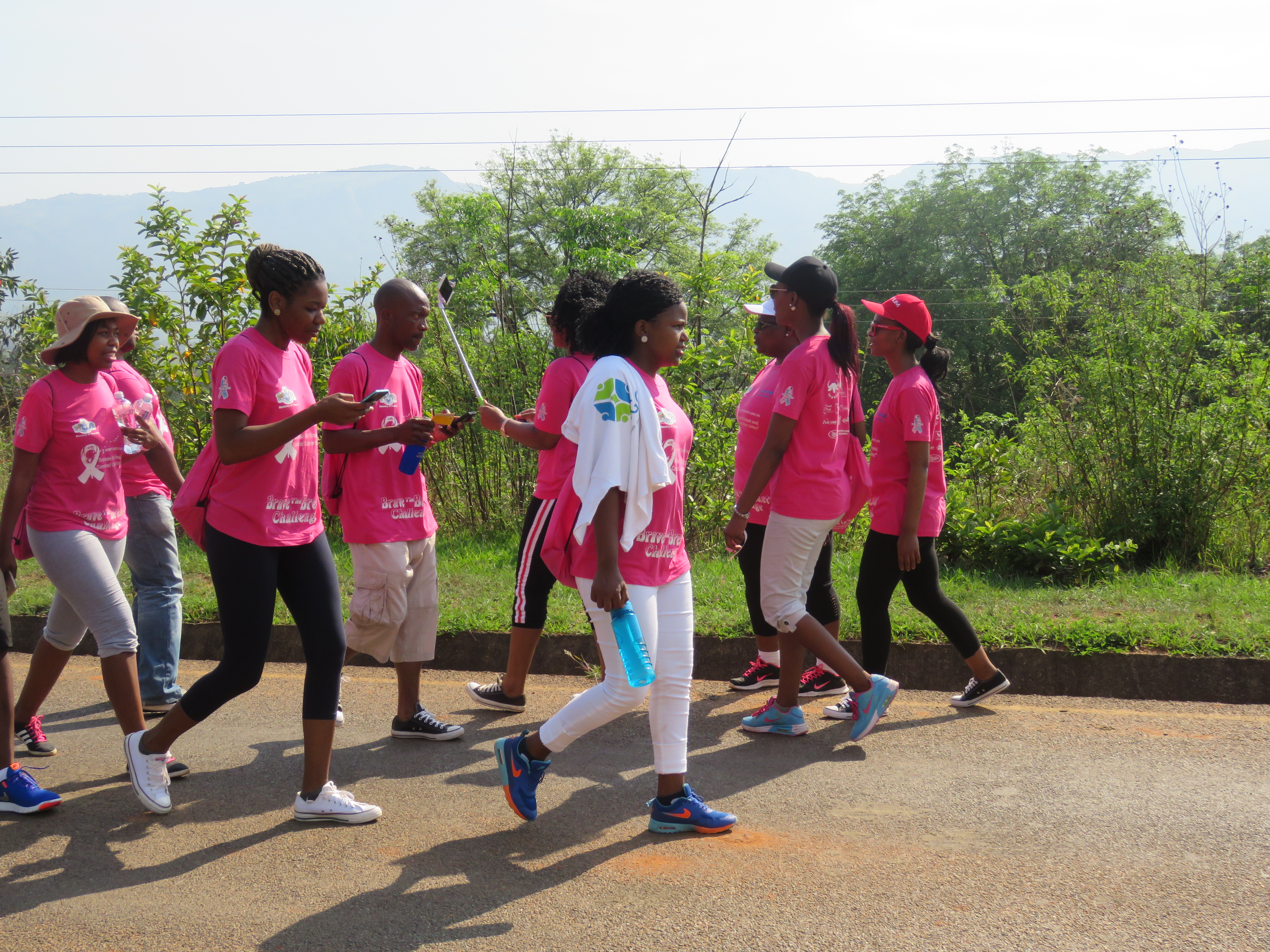
Mbabane: Swazi people joined the "Brave the Breast" annual event in aid of the Eswatini Breast Cancer Network, 2016.

Breast Cancer Awareness Month (BCAM), also referred to in the United States as National Breast Cancer Awareness Month (NBCAM), is an annual international health campaign organized by major breast cancer charities every October to increase awareness of the disease and raise funds for research into its cause, prevention, diagnosis, treatment, and cure.

Observances of the event have faced criticism for corporate involvement by drug companies, as well as instances of pinkwashing associated with the events.

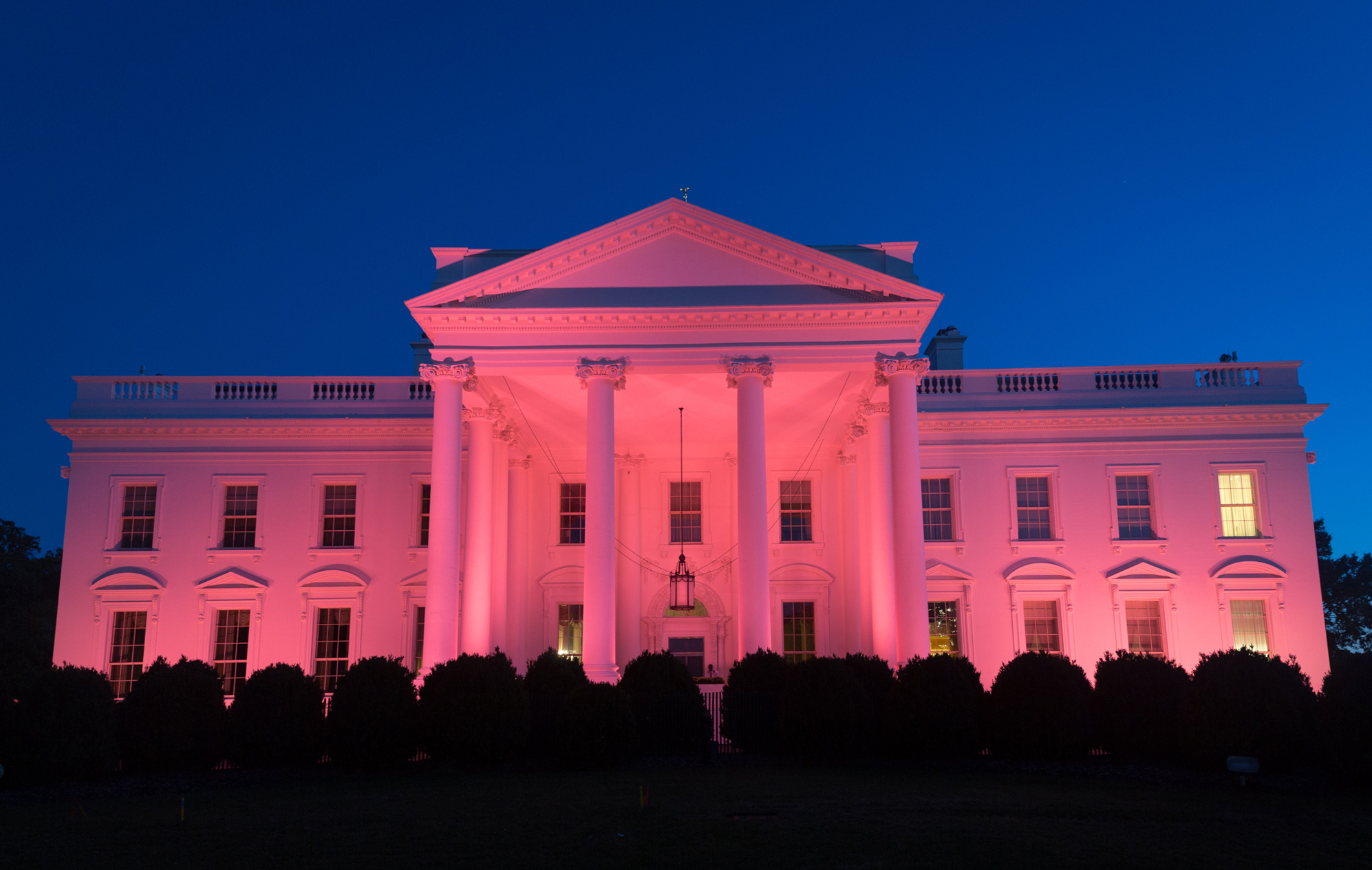
White House illuminated pink in honor of National Breast Cancer Awareness Month in 2017

== History ==
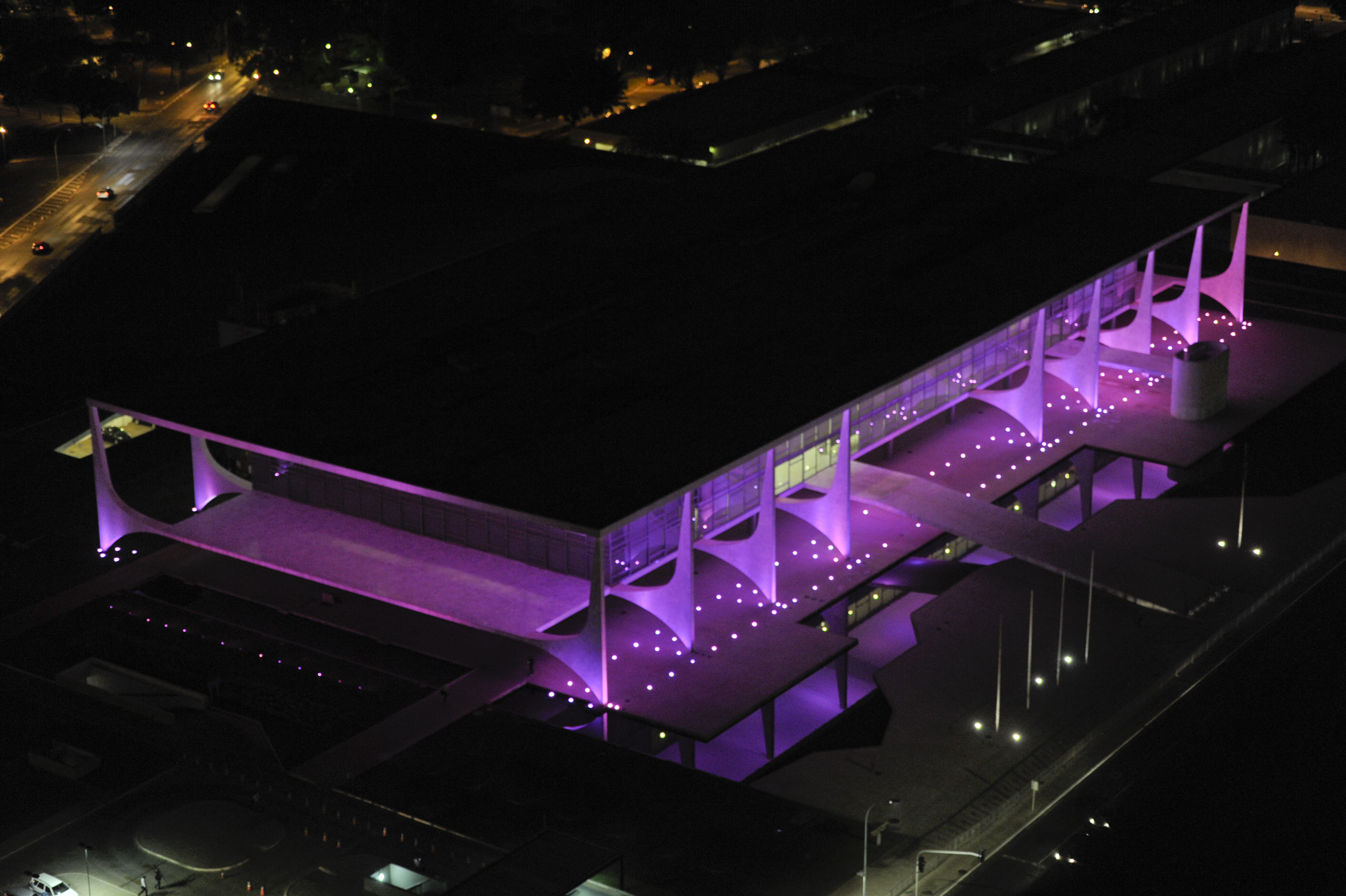
Aerial view of Palácio do Planalto, the official workplace of the President of Brazil, lit up in pink on October 1, 2014

National Breast Cancer Awareness Month was founded in 1985 in partnership between the American Cancer Society and the pharmaceutical division of Imperial Chemical Industries (now part of AstraZeneca, producer of several anti-breast cancer drugs). The aim of the NBCAM from the start has been to promote mammography as the most effective weapon in the fight against breast cancer.

In 1993 Evelyn Lauder, Senior Corporate Vice President of the Estée Lauder Companies, founded the Breast Cancer Research Foundation and established the pink ribbon as its symbol, though this was not the first time the ribbon was used to symbolize breast cancer: A 68-year-old California woman named Charlotte Haley, whose sister, daughter, and granddaughter had breast cancer, had distributed peach-color ribbons to call attention to what she perceived as inadequate funding for research. In the fall of 1991, the Susan G. Komen Foundation handed out pink ribbons to participants in its New York City race for breast cancer survivors.

In 2010, Delta Air Lines painted N845MH, a Boeing 767-432ER in "Breast Cancer Research Foundation" special colors. In September 2015, a newer version of the livery was repainted on the same plane.

== Activities and events ==
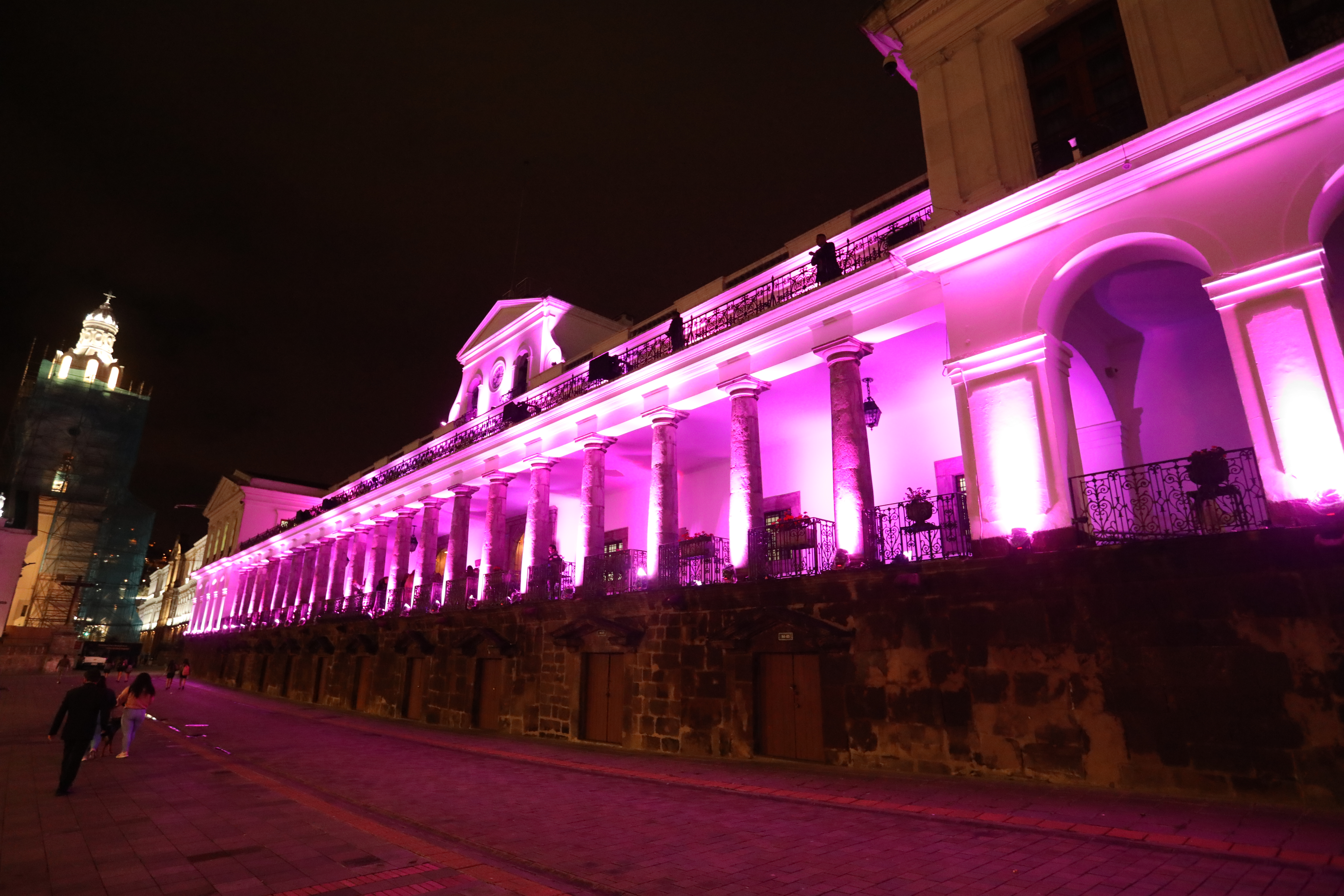
Palacio de Carondelet lit pink for Breast Cancer Awareness Month on October 17, 2022

A variety of events around the world are organized, mostly in October, including walks, runs, and the pink illumination of landmark buildings.

=== Australia ===
The Roy Hill Railway in Western Australia paints its locomotives and other equipment in bright pink.

=== France ===
In France the October event is known as 'Pink October'.

=== Pakistan ===
The Pakistani branch of Leisure Leagues organized the 2020 Leisure Leagues Women Football's Pink Cup 2020, held in Karachi with eight women's teams playing and won by Diya W.F.C.

=== United States ===
In the United States, the National Football League promotes breast cancer awareness by incorporating pink on and off the field, and comic strip artists use pink on one day in October.

There are various walks to raise money for breast cancer programs. Coincidentally, two years before the first NBCAM was founded, the first Komen Race for the Cure was held in October 1983. It is now a year-round event.

== Male breast cancer ==
Male breast cancer, which is rare, is generally overlooked. In 2009 the male breast cancer advocacy groups Out of the Shadow of Pink, A Man's Pink, and the Brandon Greening Foundation for Breast Cancer in Men joined to globally establish the third week of October as "Male Breast Cancer Awareness Week".

== Criticisms ==
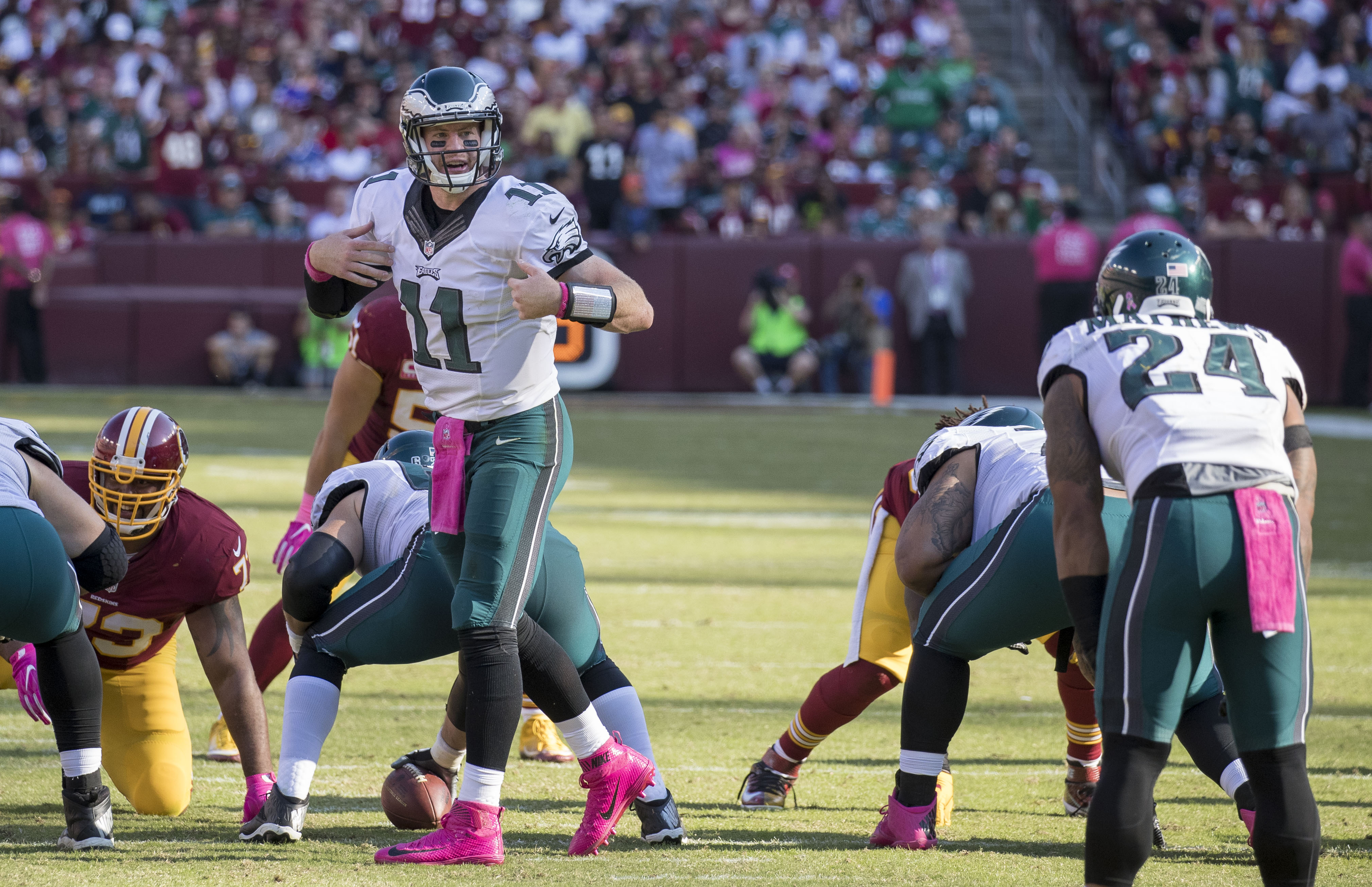
National Football League players wearing pink accessories in October 2016

Inspiration for the foundation of NBCAM came from Zeneca Inc. in 1989 when they began a breast cancer screening program within their company. In 1996, with the screening program and study complete, Zeneca Inc. analyzed the total monetary amounts lost due to the increase in health care provided compared with the total monetary amounts lost if the company was to scrap the program were compared. The total costs to the company of running the early detection program were estimated to be $400,000. Total costs to the company if they chose not to run the program were estimated to be around $1.5 million.

Pezzullo (2003) "(Astra)Zeneca’s initial justification for NBCAM was one of basic accounting, not a critique of how women’s healthcare has been assessed or implemented nor a desire to prevent women from developing breast cancer; instead, it was cost-effective for a company to detect cancer in its employees during the disease’s earlier stages."

Critics have said that "the BCAM idea 'was conceived and paid for by a British chemical company that both profits from this epidemic and may be contributing to its cause...'".

Sometimes referred to as National Breast Cancer Industry Month, critics of NBCAM point to a conflict of interest between corporations sponsoring breast cancer awareness while profiting from diagnosis and treatment. The breast cancer advocacy organization, Breast Cancer Action, has said repeatedly in newsletters and other information sources that October has become a public relations campaign that avoids discussion of the causes and prevention of breast cancer and instead focuses on "awareness" as a way to encourage women to get their mammograms. The term pinkwashing has been used by Breast Cancer Action to describe the actions of companies that manufacture and use chemicals that show a link with breast cancer and at the same time publicly support charities focused on curing the disease. Other criticisms center on the marketing of "pink products" and tie-ins, citing that more money is spent marketing these campaigns than is donated to the cause. According to the New York Times in October 2015, fine print disclaimers on pink products sold by Dick's Sporting Goods reveal that in some instances, no money at all is donated to breast cancer research. Other companies cap the amount they give to research during each October's "pink" campaign but do not tell consumers when that cap has been reached.

== Observances ==
In 1985, "National Breast Cancer Awareness Month" (NBCAM) was created as a collaborative effort between the American Academy of Family Physicians, AstraZeneca Healthcare Foundation, CancerCare, Inc., and a variety of other sponsors to raise awareness and gain funding for research for a cure."

== See also ==
- List of health-related charity fundraisers
- No Bra Day
- Pink Bridge
- Pink Hijab Day
- Pink ribbon
