= Alexandra Penney =

American artist, journalist, and author

- Born: Boston, Massachusetts
- Education: BA in Philosophy; Master's degree in art
- Occupations: Assistant editor Author

Alexandra Penney is an American artist, journalist, and author.

== Biography ==
Penney was born in Boston, Massachusetts, to Greek-American parents. She graduated from Smith College with a BA in Philosophy. As a single mother, she entered the field of journalism to be more financially stable. Her first job was as an assistant editor at Vogue, which she left to complete a Master's degree in art, also at Smith College.

Penney later began her career as a painter, with several group shows in New York to her credit. She continued to paint and work as a freelancer for various magazines, and she wrote a weekly column at The New York Times Magazine. She authored the best-seller How to Make Love to a Man, which was on The New York Times Best Seller List for over a year. At Condé Nast she became the editor of the magazine Self, where she created the Pink Ribbon.

As an artist, she has had numerous solo exhibitions in New York, Germany, and Miami. As of early 2009, she now owns an artist's studio in the SoHo neighborhood of Manhattan, a cottage in West Palm Beach, Florida, and what was described as a "beach shack" in Wainscott, New York.

== Self and the pink ribbon ==
As editor of Self magazine, Penney succeeded the founder, Phyllis Starr, who died of breast cancer. Wanting to pay tribute to Starr, Penney, working with Nancy Smith, the executive editor of Self, created the first pink ribbon with the permission of SI Newhouse Jr., the owner of Condé Nast. At a meeting on the same day that the ribbon was created, she called Evelyn Lauder, a friend and breast cancer survivor, to edit the first breast cancer issue of Self and to ask for her help in getting the pink ribbon to Estée Lauder customers. Lauder, then Senior Vice President of Estée Lauder, began to take the pink ribbon through Estée Lauder sales counters.

Self magazine's first annual issue for National Breast Cancer Awareness Month came after an April 1991 lunch at the 21 Club, at which Penney discussed ideas for articles about breast cancer with Evelyn Lauder. They established The Breast Cancer Research Foundation and formalized the pink ribbon as a symbol for breast cancer awareness as part of Self magazine's second annual Breast Cancer Awareness Month issue in 1992. Both Penney and Lauder were commended at the White House by President Bill Clinton and First Lady Hillary Clinton.

Having been employed by the magazine since 1989, Penney left Self in July 1994 to assume the position of director of new media development at Condé Nast Publications. Less than a week later, Penney changed her mind and announced that she would stay at Self.

== How to Make Love to a Man ==
Her 143-page-long book How to Make Love to a Man became a best-seller in 1981. It took Penney two years to research the book, which included interviewing more than 200 men. Clarkson Potter gave an advance of $75,000 for the book, its largest to that time, but wanted extensive changes after Penney delivered the initial manuscript. The book was published on May 22, 1981, had sold 130,000 copies within its first five months, and had paperback rights sold to Dell Publishing for $275,000. The book, still in print with over 29 printings, has been translated into 21 languages.

== Madoff scandal ==
Penney had earned a substantial amount of money from her writing, almost all of which was invested with Bernie Madoff after a friend steered her to Madoff in the 1990s, assuring her that her finances would be safe. While she did not disclose the amount of her losses at the advice of her lawyers, Penney indicated that she still had enough money in her checking account to last a few months. Penney wrote a series of posts on The Daily Beast titled "The Bag Lady Papers" starting in December 2008 in which she shared her experiences.
