= Kickin'Inn (restaurant chain) =

Australian seafood restaurant chain

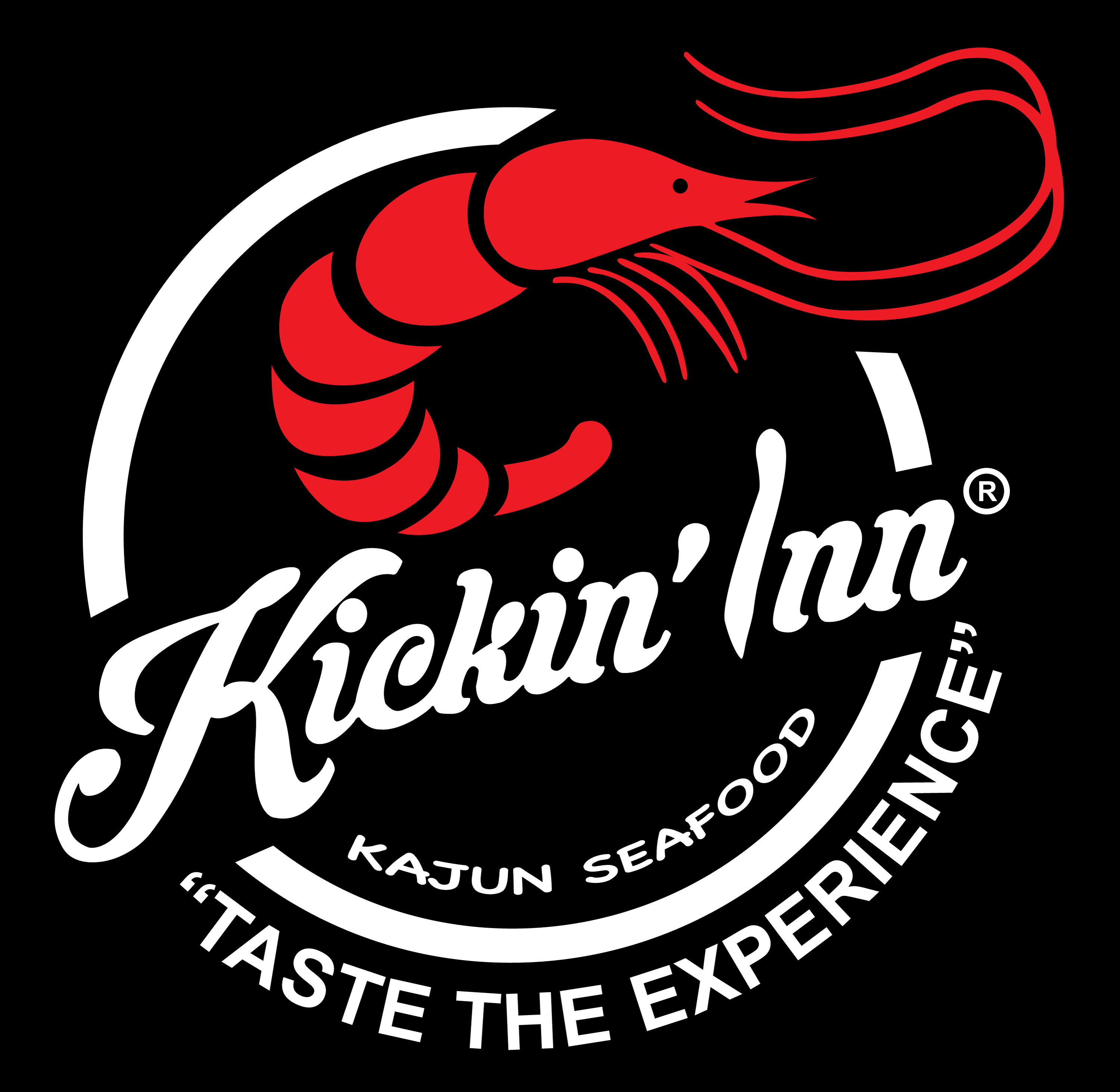
- Type: Private
- Industry: Restaurant chain
- Founded: 2018
- Headquarters: Bankstown, New South Wales
- Key people: Ravi Singh (co-founder, CEO), Sami Karras (co-founder, managing director)
- Website: www.kickininn.com.au

Kickin’Inn is an Australian seafood restaurant chain founded in 2018 by Ravi Singh and Sami Karras.

== Overview ==
The first Kickin’Inn restaurant opened in Petersham, Sydney, on 17 September 2018, after the concept was developed in Dubai in 2017. Additional locations include Bankstown RSL Club in New South Wales, Woden in Canberra (opened March 2022), and Penrith on Mulgoa Road (opened December 2022), which replaced a former Hooters site. The chain engages in community activities, such as supporting breast cancer awareness and environmental programs, and has partnered with organizations like Little Wings and the Prostate Cancer Foundation of Australia. During the COVID-19 pandemic, it provided meals to frontline workers and supported local charities.

As of 2025, the chain has 25 locations across Australia, including Canberra, Melbourne, New South Wales, Adelaide, Brisbane, and Perth..

It serves Cajun-style seafood boils, with food placed directly on the table without plates. The menu includes prawns, crabs, mussels, and lobsters cooked in seasoned bags with sauces like "Sha-Bang," a mix of Cajun spices, garlic butter, and lemon pepper. Customers use gloves and bibs provided by the restaurant..
