= The Scar Project =

The Scar Project poster

The SCAR Project is a series of large-scale portraits of young breast cancer survivors shot by fashion photographer David Jay.

== Origins ==
Jay was inspired to begin shooting The Scar Project in 2005, when a friend was diagnosed with breast cancer at age 29. Since then, Jay has photographed over 100 young women ages 18–35 across the nation. A mission of The Scar Project is to raise awareness of early-onset breast cancer, and to help young survivors see their experience through a fresh lens.

== Themes ==
"Breast cancer is not a pink ribbon" is a frequent message throughout The Scar Project. Jay states that "in our society, breast cancer is hidden behind a little pink ribbon that (unintentionally) diminishes something that is terrifying, disfiguring, deadly." Jay hopes that The Scar Project "presents an opportunity to open a dialogue about issues we are not necessarily comfortable with."

== Scar Project women ==
Many women who have been the subjects of The Scar Project claim that their participation in the project represents a personal victory over fighting the disease. The Scar Project also gives voice to the lives of women who have since died fighting breast cancer. In one instance within the series, an empty black frame represents one woman who died days before her photograph was to be taken.

== Publications and acknowledgments ==
- A book, The Scar Project: Breast Cancer Is Not A Pink Ribbon, Volume 1, was published in 2011. It contains 50 portraits of young women surviving cancer, as well as an autobiographical commentary from each subject.
- Baring It All, a documentary film about David Jay and The Scar Project, was aired on the Style Network on July 9, 2011. Directed by filmmaker Patricia Zagarella of Lost in Vision Entertainment, Baring It All was screened at several film festivals, including the Big Sky Documentary Film Festival, and Breast Fest Film Festival in Toronto. In 2012, Baring It All received a Daytime Emmy Award.
