= Pinkwashing =

Pinkwashing may refer to:

- Pinkwashing (breast cancer), the promotion of consumer goods and services using pink ribbons representing support for breast cancer-related charities
- Pinkwashing (LGBTQ), the promotion of the gay-friendliness of a corporate or political entity in an attempt to downplay or soften aspects considered negative
