= Pinkwashing (breast cancer) =

Form of cause marketing that uses a range of pink ribbon logos

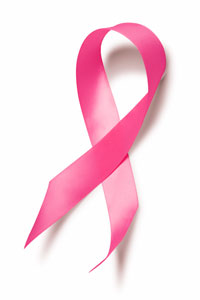
Picture of a pink ribbon

Pinkwashing is a form of cause marketing that uses pink ribbon logos to show support for breast cancer-related charities or foundations on products that are known to cause different types of cancer.

The term 'pinkwashing' is associated with companies that use the pink ribbon symbol or use the support of breast cancer charities as a marketing technique, to promote one of their products, while at the same time manufactured products have proven to contain ingredients that are linked to the disease developed or are used in a manner that associates it with the increased risk of disease. Pinkwashing has also been used to categorize rainbow marketing for the LGBTQ+ community as well as many other communities.

== Origin of the pink ribbon ==
The pink ribbon first originated from a woman named Charlotte Hayley in 1992. Charlotte hand made and dispensed peach colored ribbons with informational cards that read " The National Cancer Institute annual budget is $1.8 billion, only 5% goes for cancer prevention. Help us wake up our legislators and Americans by wearing this ribbon". Companies such as Susan G. Komen had used the ribbon but the ribbons became most popular when Estée Lauder agreed to place the bright pink ribbon on all the products across the United States.

== Advertisement and marketing controversies ==
According to Breast Cancer Action, the following questions can help a consumer assess whether a company is engaging in pinkwashing:

- How much money from the company is going to breast cancer awareness and/or research?
- What organization will receive these funds?
- Is there a cap on how much the company will donate?
- Do the company's practices reflect the marketing done?

As the largest organization monetizing breast cancer, the Susan G. Komen Foundation with its licensing of a proprietary trademark is running the "pink ribbon" logo and slogan on a wide range of products. It has drawn close scrutiny over 'pinkwashing' products.

One of NBCAM's largest supporters is the AstraZeneca Health Care Foundation: "Since the Foundation began, it has supported NBCAM's goals of public awareness, public education, knowledge sharing, and greater access to services in the fight against breast cancer." However, some scholars question the true intentions of AstraZeneca, for example, in P. C. Pezzullo's article, "Resisting 'National Breast Cancer Awareness Month': The Rhetoric of Counterpublics and their Cultural Performances". The Toxic Links Coalition (TLC) disapproves of AstraZeneca being NBCAM's initial supporter. For this reason, "TLC emphasizes the importance of stopping the production of carcinogenic toxic chemicals" (Pezzullo, p. 353). Komen promotions which have drawn criticism include Houston-based fracking equipment and vendor Baker Hughes, who sponsored $100,000 for a campaign with the tagline, "Doing their bit for a cure". Opponents insist that hydraulic fracturing extracts oil and gas, using a mixture of water and chemicals, including known or possible carcinogens. Similar concerns have been raised about automobile manufacturers as sponsors, as vehicle exhaust contains carcinogens.

The "pinkwashing" issue is not limited to Komen and its sponsors. In 2007, the Estée Lauder Pink Ribbon Collection series used a donation to The Breast Cancer Research Foundation (BCRF) to promote products containing parabens, which are linked to breast cancer. In 2012, the Food and Drug Administration connected 5-Hour Energy drinks—a caffeinated energy shot, promoted using a Living Beyond Breast Cancer (LBBC) sponsorship as cause marketing—to thirteen deaths and serious injuries, including heart attacks.

In 2008, Think Before You Pink launched an online campaign against Yoplait, the national sponsor of Susan G. Komen's annual walk. Their pink-lidded yogurt was sold to raise money for breast cancer but was made from dairy containing the hormone rBGH or rBST (recombinant bovine growth hormone or recombinant bovine somatotrophin). With enough pressure from the public, General Mills (the manufacture of Yoplait) pledged to go rBGH-free.

In 2010, Komen briefly partnered with Kentucky Fried Chicken (KFC) on a "Buckets for a Cure" campaign. In response, Breast Cancer Action launched the "What the Cluck?" campaign, arguing that, although Komen's intentions may have been to promote KFC's new grilled chicken and vegetable meals, the same pink buckets held fried chicken, which can be attributed to high-fat diets linked to cancer risk and diseases. Komen contested and saw the marketing as effective because they were able to reach women who were not brought in by other advertisements in their neighbourhoods, like the billboards or the spokesperson at their church. According to Komen, KFC's pink buckets of chicken helped raise $4 million, and "money from partnerships such as this allowed Komen to provide screening mammograms to 600,000 women last year".

=== Target marketing ===
==== Alcohol ====
Drinking alcoholic beverages increases the risk of breast cancer.

Several studies indicate that the use of marketing by the alcohol industry to associate their products with breast cancer awareness campaigns, known as pinkwashing, is misleading and potentially harmful. Studies have found that this marketing strategy can increase perceptions of product healthfulness and social responsibility, leading to more favorable brand attitudes and reduced support for alcohol policies that could reduce consumption. However, there is evidence that informing the public about the contradictions and dangers of this practice can increase perceptions of misleadingness and support for measures like requiring cancer risk warning labels on alcoholic products. Overall, the research suggests that pinkwashed alcohol marketing exploits women's health concerns for commercial gain and undermines public health efforts to reduce alcohol-related harms.

== See also ==
- -washing
- Susan G. Komen for the Cure
- Pink Ribbons, Inc., 2011 documentary
- Feminationalism
