= National Breast Cancer Coalition =

Advocacy organization

- Abbreviation: NBCC
- Formation: 1991
- Purpose: Breast cancer research, breast cancer advocacy, breast cancer education
- Headquarters: Washington, D.C.
- President: Fran Visco
- Website: https://www.stopbreastcancer.org/

Breast Cancer Coalition (NBCC) is a grassroots advocacy organization that combines the power of advocacy, education, policy, and research to unite around the goal of ending breast cancer.

It was founded in 1991 by a group of breast cancer survivors, including President Fran Visco. Coalition members include breast cancer support, information, and service groups, as well as the women's health and provider organizations.

== Philosophy ==
Founded in 1991, the National Breast Cancer Coalition (NBCC) is a collaboration of activists, survivors, researchers, policy-makers, grassroots groups, and national organizations that have come together as disruptive innovators for social change.

They link hundreds of organizations and tens of thousands of individuals from across the country into a diverse coalition to gain attention for breast cancer in Washington, D.C., and state capitals as well as laboratories, health care institutions, and local communities.

== Organizational goals ==
NBCC is guided by three primary goals:

- Research: Promote research into the cause of, and optimal preventive and treatment interventions for, breast cancer through increased federal funding, fostering of innovation and collaborative approaches and improved accountability.
- Access: Improve access to quality breast cancer care for all women and men, from appropriate screening policies through diagnosis, treatment, and care—particularly for the underserved and uninsured—through legislation and change in systems of delivery of health care.
- Influence: Educate and empower women and men as advocates, increasing the involvement and influence of those living with breast cancer and other breast cancer activists wherever and whenever breast cancer decisions are made.

== Funding ==
NBCC is supported through grants, contributions from individuals, corporate sponsorships, and special events. The organization encourages advocates and businesses across the country to organize fundraising events.

The National Breast Cancer Coalition Fund meets all 20 Better Business Bureau Charity Standards, has received an “A” rating from CharityWatch and is ranked four stars by Charity Navigator.
