= Pink Bridge =

8th street bridge
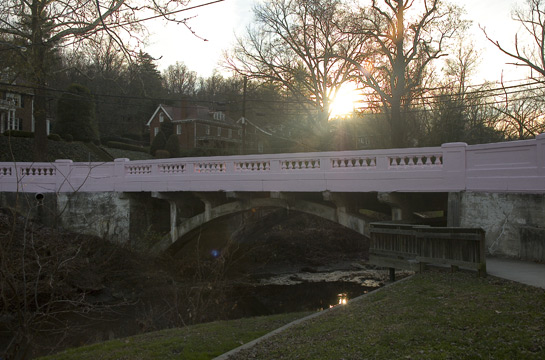
- The Pink Bridge in Ritter Park.
- Coordinates: 38.406712°N 82.441733°W
- Carries: 8th Street
- Crosses: Fourpole Creek
- Locale: Huntington, West Virginia

Location
- Interactive map of 8th street bridge

External image
- https://www.flickr.com/photos/wvagent/3503338743/

The Pink Bridge of Huntington, West Virginia is a concrete arch bridge spanning Four Pole Creek at 8th Street that was painted pink during late October to mid November 2006 to raise awareness of breast cancer.

== History ==
=== Founding ===
The project began October 25, 2006 when Jason Sansom of Barboursville, West Virginia began painting the 12th Street bridge, a smaller concrete span, pink. Originally ordered to stop by the Greater Huntington Park and Recreation District, they agreed to let Sansom finish the pink bridge painting project and then repaint it white.

=== Controversy ===
The bridge was denounced by the city council on November 10, however, Huntington Mayor David Felinton agreed to let Sansom continue to paint the span. The City Council then adopted a resolution by a seven to four margin that declared the painting of the bridge a defacement of public property and requested that the mayor ask Sansom to end the painting project. It also required that steps be taken for the pink paint to be removed. Felinton ignored the resolution.

The bridge was vandalized on the night of November 10. White and blue paint decorated the pink span.

Sansom, who had partially completed the painting of the bridge by Friday, resumed Sunday despite strong opposition from residents of the city and city council. Many complained that there was a lack of the environmental permit necessary to paint any highway span, especially one owned by the West Virginia Department of Transportation. Sansom also lacked permission from the historic preservation commission, and questions have been raised as to whether the city could be held liable in a lawsuit.

=== Further events ===
On November 13, David Pelfrey requested permission from the mayor to paint a bridge in Ritter Park red to raise awareness about lung cancer. The Mayor said that he was "open to the idea" and would "help find a bridge to paint." Pelfrey, who had no intention of painting any span red, was mocking the nearby pink span. Pelfrey publicly stated that if granted permission, he wanted to paint the Ritter Park bridge white, its original color, so that it is the most "aesthetically pleasing for the residential neighborhood" and park. He also stated that he does not support painting a bridge "obscene colors just to draw attention to something". He continued by saying that if one wanted to paint a bridge, it should be a color that is the most harmonious with the surroundings, and that a sign should be placed supporting the cause.

The 8th Street bridge painting project was completed on November 18. Sansom, who insists that the bridge will remain pink throughout 2007, is planning to author a book with the proceeds being donated to breast cancer awareness.

The bridge returned to white paint in May 2009.

== See also ==
- Transportation in Huntington, West Virginia
