= United Breast Cancer Foundation =

American organization

- Formation: 2000
- Type: Nonprofit organization
- Purpose: Support for breast cancer patients and families
- Headquarters: Huntington Station, New York
- Executive Director: Audrey Mastroianni
- Staff: 11 paid staff
- Website: ubcf.org

United Breast Cancer Foundation (UBCF), founded in October 2000, is a national nonprofit organization headquartered in Huntington Station, New York.

== Overview ==
Founded in October 2000, the United Breast Cancer Foundation (UBCF) is a national 501(c)(3) nonprofit that began as a small grassroots organization serving low-income, under and uninsured women and men in New York. UBCF provides breast cancer-related assistance programs and financial support services to patients and families.

The foundation has been a Combined Federal Campaign-approved charity since 2013.

== Fundraising and criticisms ==
According to its IRS Form 990 filings, UBCF reported total revenue of $35.3 million for the year ending December 31, 2021. It has received a Three-Star rating of "Good" from Charity Navigator, based on an assessment of its financial health and governance policies.

In 2013, the United Breast Cancer Foundation was ranked No. 35 on a list of "America's Worst Charities" compiled by The Center for Investigative Reporting and The Tampa Bay Times. The rankings were based on how much they spent on fundraising. UBCF spent $7.2 million of the $12.7 million it had raised in 2014 on professional fundraising consultants.

UBCF fundraising practices have received criticism from the NYS Attorney General's Office.

Stephanie Mastroianni, founder of UBCF, has served as UBCF's executive director since 2001. Public nonprofit filings have reported compensation paid to Mastroianni and listed members of the Mastroianni family among the organization's directors.

=== Kars-R-Us and FTC complaint ===
In 2025, UBCF was named in a complaint and summary order filed by the Federal Trade Commission and other state agencies regarding fundraising activities conducted on its behalf by Kars-R-Us.com. The FTC alleged that deceptive representations were made to donors regarding vehicle donations benefiting UBCF.
