= Pink Ribbons, Inc. =

- Directed by: Léa Pool
- Written by: Patricia Kearns; Nancy Guerin; Léa Pool
- Based on: Pink Ribbons, Inc: Breast Cancer and the Politics of Philanthropy by Samantha King
- Produced by: Ravida Din
- Cinematography: Daniel Jobin; Sylvaine Dufaux; Nathalie Moliavko-Visotzky
- Edited by: Oana Suteu
- Production company: National Film Board of Canada
- Distributed by: First Run Features (U.S.)
- Release dates: September 11, 2011 (Toronto Film Festival); February 3, 2012 (Canada)
- Running time: 97 minutes
- Country: Canada
- Language: English

Pink Ribbons, Inc. is a 2011 National Film Board of Canada (NFB) documentary about the pink ribbon campaign, directed by Léa Pool and produced by Ravida Din. The film is based on the 2006 book Pink Ribbons, Inc: Breast Cancer and the Politics of Philanthropy by Samantha King, associate professor of kinesiology and health studies at Queen's University.

The film documents how some companies use pink ribbon-related marketing to increase sales while contributing only a small fraction of proceeds to the cause, or use "pinkwashing" to improve their public image while manufacturing products that may be carcinogenic. For the millions that are raised for breast cancer research by the campaign, the film argues that not enough money goes to prevention or exploring possible environmental factors. Pink Ribbons, Inc. features interviews with critics of the pink ribbon campaign, researchers and cancer patients as well as cancer fundraisers such as Nancy Brinker, head of Susan G. Komen for the Cure.

Pool interviews Charlotte Haley, who began a peach-coloured ribbon campaign more than 20 years ago to press the National Cancer Institute to increase its budget for cancer prevention research, from a mere 5 per cent. When Haley was approached by Self magazine and cosmetics company Estée Lauder in 1992 to use her ribbons in a breast cancer awareness campaign she refused, because she had no desire to be part of a commercial effort. So the company changed the colour to pink, to circumvent Haley's efforts.

Also featured is the "IV League," a support group in Austin, Texas for women diagnosed with Stage 4 breast cancer, who feel unwelcome in the pink ribbon movement because, in the words of one member, "They’re learning to live and you’re learning to die." Author Samantha King has called it “the tyranny of cheerfulness.”

== Development ==
Ravida Din, an NFB producer, is a breast cancer survivor who had read Samantha King's book as well as Barbara Ehrenreich's 2001 Harper's Magazine article "Welcome to Cancerland" after her own experience with the disease and its treatment:

“I was initially fascinated by King’s economic and historical context around philanthropy,” she said. “The question I was intrigued by was, ‘How did we get to this kind of breast cancer culture that privileges shopping [as a solution] as opposed to getting angry and asking for change?'"

After developing an outline for the project with help from scriptwriters Nancy Guerin and Patricia Kearns, Din began looking for the right director, and approached Pool with the project.

== Style ==
Pool illustrates written facts about breast cancer, in place of traditional documentary narration, and includes animation by Francis Gelinas as well as an archival TV clip of Alfred Hitchcock directing William Shatner as a doctor telling a patient she has breast cancer. The film heavily features the colour pink, on clothing, in marketing, and floodlit monuments like Niagara Falls and the Empire State Building. This movie also shows several clips of public rallies and walking/running events, such as the Komen Walk for the Cure.

== Reception ==
=== Release ===
Pink Ribbons, Inc. premiered at the 2011 Toronto International Film Festival. It opened in Canadian theatres on February 3, 2012, a date which coincided with the reversal of a controversial Susan G. Komen attempt to sever ties to Planned Parenthood's US breast screening clinic programme.

According to Deborah Drisdell, head of the NFB's accessibility and digital enterprises division, the NFB chose to distribute the film itself in Canada rather than use a commercial distributor to better control the marketing and capitalize on its ongoing work with community groups in Canada. First Run Features will distribute Pink Ribbons, Inc. in the United States.

=== Critical reviews ===
Currently, Pink Ribbons, Inc. has a rating of 88% on Rotten Tomatoes, based on 33 reviews and an average score of 7/10.
