= Breast cancer research stamp =

1998 USPS Breast Cancer research semi-postal Stamp

The breast cancer research stamp (BCRS) is a semi-postal non-denominated postage stamp issued by the United States Postal Service, priced in 2011 as eleven cents higher than the standard first-class letter rate. The surplus above the price of the first-class stamp is collected by the United States Postal Service (USPS) and allocated to the National Institutes of Health (NIH) and the Department of Defense (DoD) for breast cancer research.

Originally created in 1997, Congress has reauthorized the Breast Cancer Research Stamp several times. The original sponsors for the bill were United States Senators Dianne Feinstein (D-CA), Alfonse D’Amato (R-NY), and Lauch Faircloth (R-NC), and United States Representatives Vic Fazio (D-CA) and Susan Molinari (R-NY). Breast cancer surgeon Ernie Bodai, breast cancer survivor and advocate Betsy Mullen, and breast cancer advocate David Goodman who lost his first wife to breast cancer, spearheaded the grassroots advocacy efforts in partnership with Senator Feinstein and her colleagues that led to the creation and issuance of the stamp.

The Breast Cancer Research Stamp is an example of conscientious consumption in cause marketing, in which a person substitutes buying and consuming along with a tiny donation, for making a more significant donation.

== History and description ==
In 1996, the United States Postal Service Breast Cancer Awareness Stamp (the pink ribbon stamp at the then-current first class rate of 32 cents) was issued and did not sell well.

The Breast Cancer Research Stamp was the idea of Ernie Bodai, MD, a breast surgeon. In 1997 he approached the United States Postal Service about pricing a stamp a few pennies over the regular price with the extra pennies to be used for breast cancer research. He was turned away. Dr. Bodai is a Kaiser Permanente surgeon who performs lumpectomies and mastectomies on women with breast cancer. Betsy Mullen is a breast cancer survivor and advocate, the Founder of WIN Against Breast Cancer and the Breast Buddy Breast Care Program. Dr. Bodai, Betsy Mullen and David Goodman spent their money and time lobbying for Congress' approval of the Breast Cancer Research Stamp. Dr. Bodai later began a nonprofit organization called Cure Breast Cancer Inc. to raise money to bring attention to the BCR Stamp and the breast cancer cause.

In 1995, in the U.S. House of Representatives Committee on Appropriations, Treasury, Postal Subcommittee New York Congressman Michael Forbes attached language to the annual spending bill mandating a Breast Cancer Research Stamp be created by the United States Postal Service (USPS). Proceeds above the cost of the semipostal (fundraising) stamp were to be dedicated to breast cancer research.

In 1998, United States Senators Dianne Feinstein, Alfonse D'Amato, and Lauch Faircloth and Congressman Vic Fazio sponsored legislation in the United States Congress to create a stamp where a portion of the proceeds of sale would go toward breast cancer research, creating the Breast Cancer Research Stamp. The legislation mandated that 70% of funds raised would go to the National Cancer Institute (NCI) and 30% would go to the Breast Cancer Research Program of the Department of Defense (DOD).

Art director Ethel Kessler of Bethesda, Maryland, herself a breast cancer survivor, was asked by the USPS to design the new stamp. Kessler contacted illustrator Whitney Sherman of Baltimore to create the artwork for the stamp. Directing the project, with feedback from a postal design advisory board, Kessler discussed themes with Sherman that the stamp should depict, such as strength and courage, and to show an ethnically vague woman. It was Sherman who came up with the solution of using Artemis, the Greek goddess of the hunt, protector of women, to symbolize the fight against breast cancer. The female hunter is depicted reaching for an arrow, to symbolize that she protects women from harm and to mimic the position women take during a breast exam. Sherman's illustration is a black line drawing of the female figure on a vibrant, abstract color field, done in pastel, to give the stamp an optimistic or uplifting feel. Typographically, Kessler featured the phrases, "Fund the Fight" and "Find a Cure" outlining where the right breast should be.

On July 29, 1998, the Breast Cancer Research Stamp was issued at a White House event hosted by the First Lady Hillary Clinton with Postmaster General William Henderson, Senator Dianne Feinstein, Congressman Vic Fazio and Betsy Mullen.

The stamp originally cost 40 cents; a regular first-class stamp cost 34 cents at that time. 70 percent of funds raised are donated to the National Cancer Institute and 30 percent to the Breast Cancer Research Program of the Department of Defense. As of May 2006, US$35.2 million had been donated to the NCI and the Department of Defense had collected US$15.1 million.

United States Senators Dianne Feinstein, Alfonse D'Amato and New York Congressman Vic Fazio who championed the Breast Cancer Research Stamp in Congress, calls the reauthorization of the BCR Stamp "good news in the fight against breast cancer." Originally set for a limited run, its release was extended numerous times by acts of the U.S. Congress with the most recent reauthorization legislation going through December 31, 2015.

Since the Breast Cancer Research Stamp first went on sale on July 29, 1998 through November 2011, the United States Postal Service has sold more than 924 million stamps, raising approximately $72 million for breast cancer research at the NIH and DoD. The Breast Cancer Research Stamp currently costs 85 cents and is deemed valid as a 68-cent first-class stamp. The additional 17 cents charged for each semipostal (fundraising) stamp is directed to research programs at the National Institutes of Health, which receives 70 percent of the net proceeds, and the Department of Defense breast cancer research programs, which receive the remaining 30 percent of the net proceeds.

The Breast Cancer Research Stamp is offered through the United States Postal Service as an alternative to a first-class postage stamp. Purchasing the stamp is a convenient and voluntary way to contribute to the fight against breast cancer. Congress passed "The Stamp Out Breast Cancer Act of 1997" and the BCR Stamp was first issued on July 29, 1998, becoming the country's first fundraising stamp.

In 2014 the stamp was reissued with that year's date below the "USA", rather than "1998" to the side, as shown above. Thus there are two varieties of the Breast Cancer Research Stamp, separately listed in the Scott catalogue as "B1" and "B5". Like some other stamps during the 2012-16 period, the Postal Service issued the 2014 stamp twice, both with and, less commonly, without a die cut. This made the latter an imperforated variety.

== Programs supported ==
The funds generated by the Breast Cancer research Stamp have gone to researchers making significant advances in breast cancer research and have been used to fund research grants to support new, innovative programs. According to the National Institutes of Health, some of the programs the National Cancer Institute (NCI) has funded with proceeds from the stamp include the following:

- Insight Awards to Stamp-Out Breast Cancer (2000–2002): Funded high-risk exploration by scientists employed outside the federal government who conduct research at their own institutions. The grants were awarded for a two-year period. NCI awarded 43 grants through this initiative for a total of $9.5 million.
- Exceptional Opportunities in Breast Cancer Research (2003–2006): Funded well-established research that would not have been funded otherwise. The grants were awarded for a period of four years. NCI awarded 10 grants for a total estimate of $11.6 million.
- Clinical Trial to Determine Risk of Breast Cancer Recurrence (2005): This clinical trial is designed to select lymph node-negative, hormone receptor-positive breast cancers for chemotherapy treatment according to their risk of recurrence as measured by a test called OncotypeDx. One-time contract award in the amount of $4.5 million.
- Breast Cancer Pre-Malignancy Program (2006): A comprehensive program in breast cancer pre-malignancy research that includes the areas of prevention, etiology, biology, diagnosis, and molecular epidemiology. A total of $8.1 million will be awarded for the following projects: "Molecular Epidemiology and Biology of Mammographic Density", "Evaluate Different Decision-Making Approaches Used by Women Recruited for Participation in Chemoprevention Trials", "Early Detection of Breast Cancer — Evaluation Strategies to Improve the Accuracy of Mammography Interpretation with the Breast Cancer Surveillance Consortium Research Resources", "Biology of Breast Pre-Malignancy", "Isolation, Propagation, Characterization and Imaging", and "MRI-Guided Therapy with Target SPIO Carbon Nanostructure".

One of the Congressional research programs managed by the USAMRMC Office of Congressionally Directed Medical Research Programs (CDMRP) is the Breast Cancer Research Program (BCRP). As a result of the Stamp Out Breast Cancer Act, the DOD BCRP is one of two designated recipients of revenues from sales of the US Postal Service's Breast Cancer Stamp. The Stamp Out Breast Cancer Act (Public Law 105–41) resulted from the work of advocates for breast cancer research. This legislation led to the United States Postal Service's issuance of a new first-class stamp, the Breast Cancer Research Stamp, that can be purchased on a voluntary basis by the public.

== Timeline ==
Since the Breast Cancer Research Stamp was first offered for sale in 1998 the DOD BCRP has received 30% from the sales of the US Postal Service's first class Breast Cancer Research Stamp (Public Law 105–41, Stamp Out Breast Cancer Act [H.R. 1585]), totalling $16,387,657.27.

- In July 2000, the "Semipostal Authorization Act" amended the "Stamp Out Breast Cancer Act" legislation by extending the sale of the Breast Cancer Research Stamp for two (2) years through the summer of 2002.
- The "Breast Cancer Research Stamp Act of 2001" (S. 1256 and H.R. 2725), enacted as part of the Treasury and General Government Appropriations Act of 2002 (Public Law 207–67), extended the sale of the "Semipostal Authorization Act" for breast cancer research to December 31, 2003.
- Public Law 108-199 extended the Breast Cancer Research Stamp authorization through 2005.
- In 2005, Congress extended the sale of the Breast Cancer Research Stamp to December 31, 2011.
- In 2011, Congress extended the sale of the Breast Cancer Research Stamp to December 31, 2015. The four-year extension of the Breast Cancer Research Stamp Act passed in the Senate on a unanimous vote on Dec. 5, 2011, and passed in the House on Dec. 14, 2011 by a vote of 417–1.

== Program accomplishments and outcomes ==
As Breast Cancer Research Stamp revenues become available to the CDMRP, the funds are applied to Idea Awards under negotiation at the time. In FY07, the stamp funds began funding Synergistic Idea Awards also. The DOD has fully funded 34 BCRP Idea Awards, partially funded 2 other Idea Awards as well as fully funded one Synergistic Idea Award and partially funded 2 others. The BCRP Idea Awards are intended to encourage innovative approaches to breast cancer research and are a backbone of the BCRP's portfolio of awards.

Many of the research projects supported by Breast Cancer Research Stamp funds are studying the changes in breast cells that result in the development of breast cancer from normal breast cells, focusing on understanding how and why breast cancer cells continue to grow and divide. Understanding these changes offers the opportunity to develop new drugs to prevent or treat breast cancer.

Metastasis is the spread of tumors to distant sites. Several of the Breast Cancer Research Stamp Awards are seeking to develop new drugs to prevent cancer progression and metastasis.

Risk is another approach to the study of breast cancer. Researchers supported by Breast Cancer Research Stamp funds assess risk by examining individuals or groups of people (populations) who are at risk of developing the disease.

The Breast Cancer Research Stamp funds also support two projects using nanotechnology. The ultimate goal of both projects is to use nanoparticles for the early detection of breast cancer.

== Sales ==
Loganville, a small town in Georgia, started a campaign to increase sales of the Breast Cancer Research Stamp called "Contract to Cure Cancer". This campaign succeeded in making the Loganville post office the number one seller per capita of the Breast Cancer Research Stamp.
