= Pink ribbon =

Symbol of breast cancer awareness

The pink ribbon is an international symbol of breast cancer awareness. Pink ribbons, and the color pink in general, identify the wearer or promoter with the breast cancer brand and express moral support for people with breast cancer. Pink ribbons are most commonly seen during National Breast Cancer Awareness Month.

== History ==
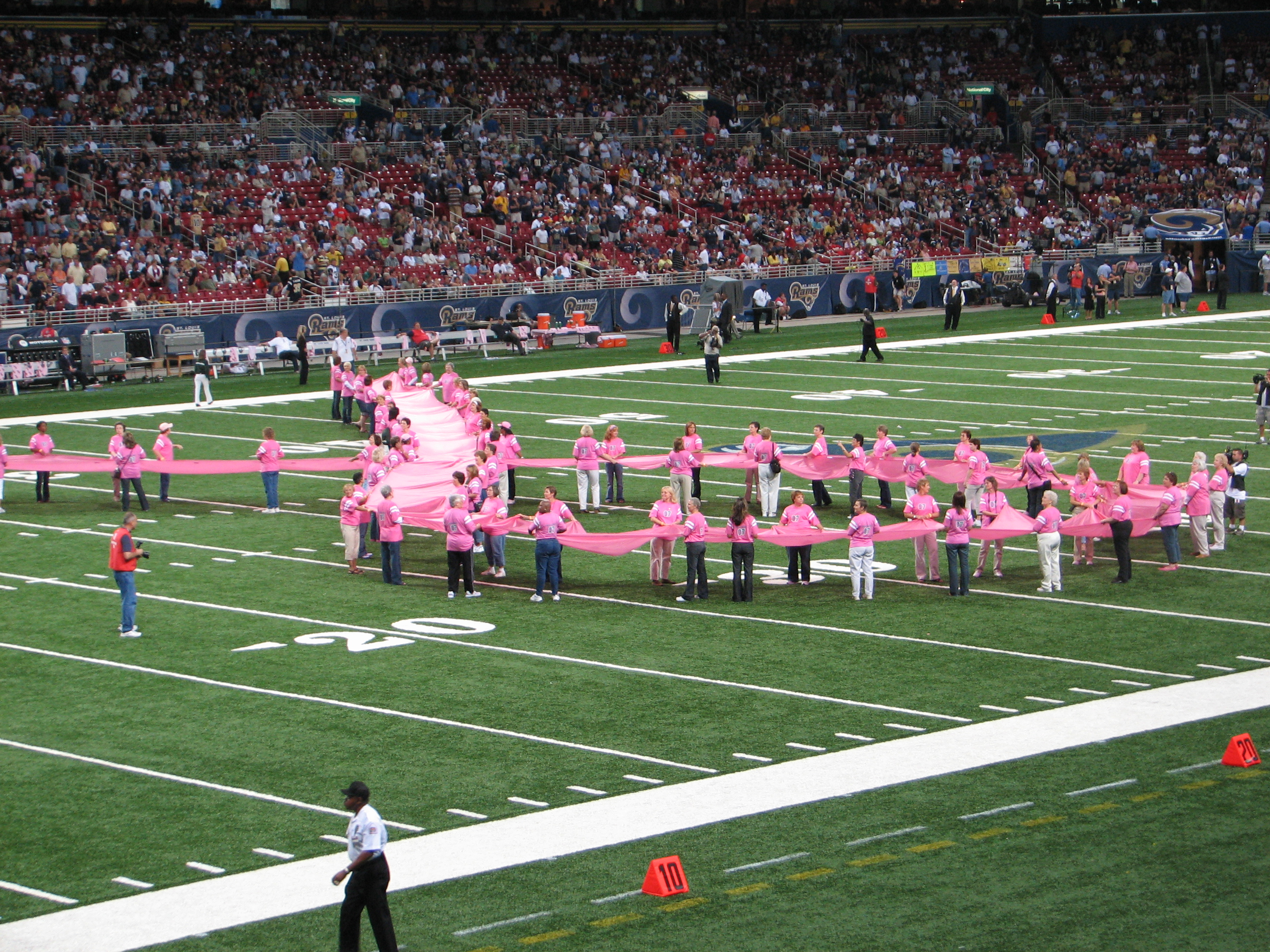
One hundred women who survived breast cancer carry a pink ribbon and create the fight breast cancer logo.

Charlotte Haley, a breast cancer survivor, introduced the concept of a peach-coloured breast cancer awareness ribbon in 1991. She attached them to cards which read, "The National Cancer Institute's annual budget is 1.8 billion US dollars, and only 5 percent goes to cancer prevention. Help us wake up our legislators and America by wearing this ribbon." Her In Memoriam on Breast Cancer Action summarized her mission with, "Though Charlotte Haley's peach ribbon has been eclipsed by its cheerful pink cousin, her grassroots activism and commitment to breast cancer prevention continue to inspire members of our community."

Evelyn Lauder, then Senior Corporate VP of Estee Lauder and creator of the Clinique brand, and Alexandra Penney, an editor at Self, are often credited as the creators of the pink ribbon. They formalized the pink ribbon in Self Magazine's second annual Breast Cancer Awareness Month issue in 1992. Penney wanted to improve on the success of the magazine's first annual issue so the pair created a ribbon that would be placed in Estee Lauder's New York City stores to raise awareness. Lauder later put the ribbon on Estee Lauder's products across the United States.

== Meaning ==
The color pink is considered feminine in modern Western countries. It evokes traditional feminine gender roles, caring for other people, being beautiful, being good, and being cooperative.

The pink ribbon represents the courage to fight breast cancer, hope for the future, and the charitable goodness of people and businesses who publicly support the breast cancer movement. It is intended to evoke solidarity with women who currently have breast cancer.

Breast cancer organizations use the pink ribbon to associate themselves with breast cancer, to promote breast cancer awareness, and to support fundraising. Some breast cancer-related organizations, such as Pink Ribbon International, use the pink ribbon as their primary symbol. Susan G. Komen for the Cure uses a stylized "running ribbon" as their logo.

While specifically representing breast cancer awareness, the pink ribbon is also a symbol and a proxy of goodwill towards women in general. Buying, wearing, displaying, or sponsoring pink ribbons signals that the person or business cares about women. The pink ribbon is a marketing brand for businesses that allows them to promote themselves with women and identify themselves as being socially aware. Compared to other women's issues, promoting breast cancer awareness is politically safe.

== Products ==
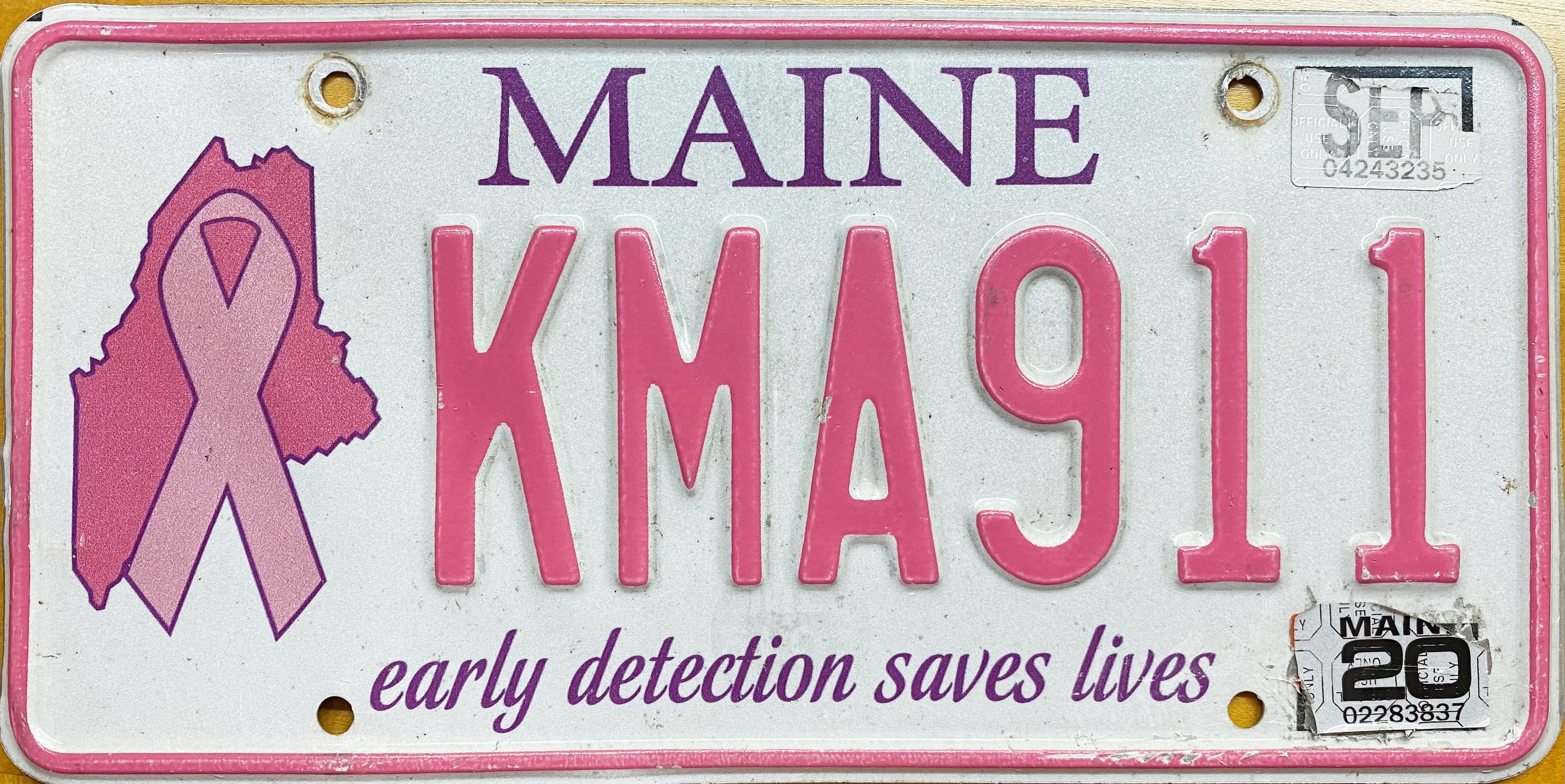
Pink ribbon on a Maine license plate, with the slogan "Early detection saves lives"

Each October, many products are emblazoned with pink ribbons, colored pink, or otherwise sold with a promise of a small portion of the total cost being donated to support breast cancer awareness or research.

The first breast cancer awareness stamp in the U.S., featuring a pink ribbon, was issued 1996. As it did not sell well, a new stamp with an emphasis on research was designed. The new stamp does not feature the pink ribbon.

Wacoal launched a bra in 1999 known as the Awareness Bra, which features a pink ribbon on each band to remind women to be conscious of their breast health. In 2001, the Fit for the Cure campaign was launched to raise funds for breast cancer awareness and research. Wacoal donates to Susan G. Komen for every woman who participates in a complimentary fitting during Fit for the Cure.

In Canada, the Royal Canadian Mint produced a silver commemorative breast cancer coin. 15,000 coins were minted during 2006. On one side of the coin, a portrait of Her Majesty Queen Elizabeth is illustrated, while on the other side a pink ribbon has been enameled. Additionally, 30 million 25-cent coins were minted with pink ribbons during 2006 for normal circulation. Designed by the mint's director of engraving, Cosme Saffioti, this colored coin is the second in history to be put into regular circulation.

== Intellectual property status ==
In most jurisdictions, the pink ribbon is considered public domain. However, in Canada, the Canadian Breast Cancer Foundation claimed ownership of the ribbon as a trademark until it was voluntarily abandoned.

== Criticism ==
The pink ribbon has been used in cause-related marketing, a cooperation between non-profits and businesses to promote a product that also supports a cause. Due to a lack of licensing around pink ribbon imagery in connection with breast cancer, it is subject to misuse by businesses that donate little or none of their revenue to breast cancer research. While companies such as Estée Lauder have distributed over 70 million pink ribbons, and donated over $25 million to breast cancer research, other companies have been discovered using the pink ribbon inappropriately—either by not donating their profits, or by using the pink ribbon on products that include ingredients which cause cancer.

=== Pinkwashing ===
Activism against pinkwashing targets breast cancer awareness and donation campaigns that are merely performative. The origins of activism against pinkwashing have been dated to a 1985 Breast Cancer Action (BCA) campaign. In 2002, activism against corporate pinkwashing gained international media coverage when the BCA launched its "Think before You Pink" campaign against companies or organisations "that claim to care about breast cancer by promoting a pink ribbon product, but at the same time produce, manufacture and/or sell products that are likely to cause the disease." The "Think Before You Pink" campaign urged people to "do something besides shop." The BCA has particularly excoriated major cosmetic companies such as Avon, Revlon, and Estée Lauder, which have claimed to promote women's health while simultaneously using known and/or suspected cancer-causing chemicals, such as parabens and phthalates in their products.

As an alternative to pinkwashing, the BCA runs an annual awareness campaign "Breast Cancer Industry Month" to emphasize the costs of treatment. The Susan G. Komen Foundation, founded 1982 to end breast cancer forever, has also been criticized for pinkwashing because its corporate partnerships amount to little more than cause related marketing that encourage a culture of consumerism. In response to this criticism the Komen Foundation and the then New York Attorney General Eric Schneiderman established guidelines to help consumers understand what their donations support. The use of breast cancer or the pink ribbon in causemarketing to promote products such as firearms or pornography has also drawn controversy.

In her 2006 book Pink Ribbons, Inc.: Breast Cancer and the Politics of Philanthropy, Samantha King claimed that breast cancer has been transformed from a serious disease and individual tragedy to a market-driven industry of survivorship and corporate sales pitch. The book inspired a 2012 National Film Board of Canada documentary, Pink Ribbons, Inc., directed by Léa Pool.

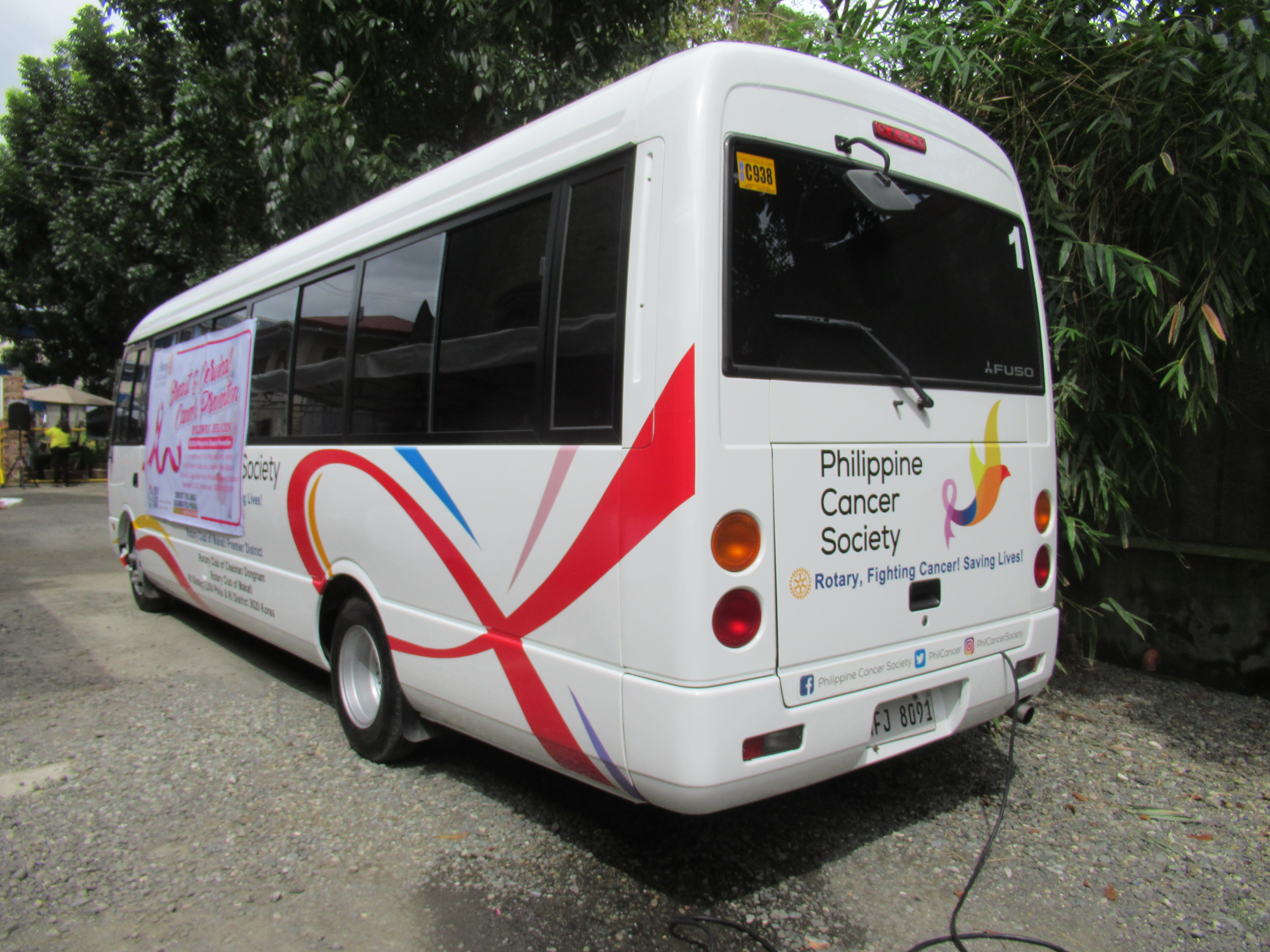
Pink ribbon Philippines Philippine Cancer Society, Inc.

== Other meanings ==
- Pink ribbons for girls (and blue for boys) were used from the mid-19th century on christening gowns in Paris, and to a limited extent in the United States. In St. Petersburg (Russia) ribbons of the same color scheme were used on white funeral shrouds for children.

== See also ==
- Awareness ribbon
- List of awareness ribbons
