= Breast Cancer Action =

American organization

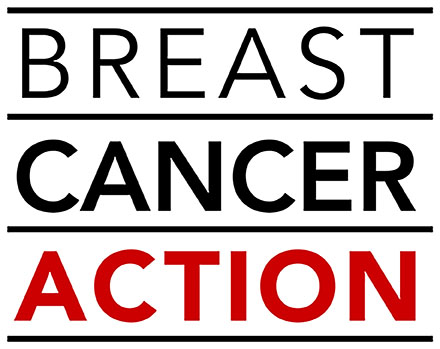
- Type: Non-profit
- Founded: 1990
- Founder: Elenore Pred, Susan Claymon, Belle Shayer
- Headquarters: 275 Fifth Street; Suite 307; San Francisco, CA 94103
- Key people: Karuna R. Jaggar (Executive Director)
- Website: bcaction.org

Breast Cancer Action (BCAction) is a U.S.-based grassroots education and activist organization driven by and supporting people living with breast cancer. It was founded in 1990 by Elenore Pred, Susan Claymon, Belle Shayer, and Linda Reyes. Based in San Francisco, BCAction is known for understanding breast cancer not as an individual crisis, but a public health emergency, and for their commitment to social justice. The organization's mission is to achieve health justice for all women at risk of and living with breast cancer. BCAction is known for its Think Before You Pink campaign, launched in 2002, which encourages consumers to ask critical questions before buying pink ribbon products and holds corporations accountable for pinkwashing.

== History ==
In 1990, a group of women living with breast cancer in the San Francisco Bay Area were seeking information about the causes and treatment of their disease. They encountered unresponsive government agencies and private organizations that provided inadequate, superficial information—not the evidence-based data they were looking for. They got angry and turned that anger into action by forming Breast Cancer Action.

The first meeting was held in founder Elenore Pred's living room. "We are meeting to organize Breast Cancer Action," the flyer for the meeting announced. "Our goals are education and political action to prevent a further rise in breast cancer." One of the group's first acts was a meeting with the director of the National Cancer Institute (NCI) to demand that the agency address the breast cancer epidemic. Founding members Elenore Pred, Susan Claymon, Belle Shayer, and Linda Reyes attended this meeting along with other breast cancer activists. Later, following the death of Pred, Susan Claymon became the first breast cancer activist to address the President's Cancer Panel in Washington, D.C. The actions of these founding women framed breast cancer not as an individual problem but as a public health crisis requiring systemic solutions, with an emphasis on empowering women living with and at risk of the disease.

In 1995 Barbara Brenner became the organization's first executive director, a position she held until 2010 when she retired due to non-breast cancer-related health issues. She was significant in increasing the organization's membership from 3,500 to more than 15,000, and increasing its emphasis on environmental issues and social critiques of the use of breast cancer activism.

Since its founding, BCAction has continued as an advocacy group dedicated to breast cancer activism at local, state and federal levels. The organization sees breast cancer not as an individual issue but a "national public health emergency." Their work has included an emphasis on more effective and less toxic breast cancer treatments that keep the needs of the public interest first; decreasing involuntary environmental exposures that put people at increased risk for breast cancer; and creating awareness that not only genes but also social injustices like political, economic, and racial inequities can lead to unequal outcomes of the disease.

== Activities ==
BCAction educates, organizes, and takes action for systemic change in three priority issue areas:

- Breast Cancer Screening, Diagnosis, and Treatment: BCAction believes all women deserve access to evidence-based, patient-centered information so they can fully engage in their healthcare decisions. The organization thinks that "breast cancer research, treatment, and screening must be patient-centered and responsive to the needs of women at risk of and living with breast cancer, and should not reflect corporate or industry bias that puts profits over patients. Their work on diagnosis and treatment examines the data from a patient perspective and includes analyses of breast cancer screening; healthcare access; drug and device approval; and more effective, less costly, and less toxic treatments.
- Root Causes of Breast Cancer: Over half of the women diagnosed with breast cancer in the United States have no known risk factors. With family history accounting for only around 10 percent of breast cancer diagnoses, a large and growing body of research indicates that toxic chemicals may increase our risk of developing the disease. In 2012, the President's Cancer Panel reported that "the true burden of environmentally induced cancer has been grossly underestimated [and] ... the American people—even before they are born—are bombarded continually with myriad combinations of these dangerous exposures." BCAction states that individual solutions like "shopping wisely" and "choosing healthy" are insufficient to stem the driving environmental causes of the breast cancer epidemic. The organization believes only large-scale systemic change can address the root causes of breast cancer and they work to address these root causes by eliminating the involuntary exposures to hazardous and toxic chemicals present in our daily lives that put people at increased risk of breast cancer. Their work is guided by the precautionary approach to public health and true primary prevention of breast cancer.
- Pink Ribbon Marketing and Culture: Breast cancer has ballooned into a multibillion-dollar industry, even as it remains a public health crisis, and the pink ribbon is now one of the most widely recognized symbols and marketing tools. The pink ribbon provides many people with a sense of community and has turned breast cancer into a topic of shared conversation rather than a shameful secret. Yet the significant lack of accountability, the absence of transparency, and the widespread hypocrisy in the pink ribbon marketing culture exploits a disease that devastates communities, misrepresents who is affected by breast cancer, and excludes and marginalizes women's diverse lived experiences of the disease. BCAction's work to end the breast cancer epidemic cuts through the pink noise to tell the hard truths about this disease and challenge "pinkwashing" hypocrisy and pink ribbon culture, which have become the status quo of the breast cancer industry. They address the impact that breast cancer has on women's lives and communities, and work to bring about the systemic changes that will end this epidemic.

== Achievements ==
Some achievements include:

- A two-year awareness campaign raised funding that helped enact the California Safe Cosmetics Act of 2005, signed by California state governor Arnold Schwarzenegger. The group considers this is a considerable achievement for the environmental breast cancer movement because toxic chemicals in cosmetics can potentially be an environmental cause of breast cancer.
- In 2009, awareness efforts including Yoplait's "Put a Lid on it" campaign which influenced General Mills and Dannon to remove recombinant bovine growth hormone (rBGH) from their dairy products. rBST has not been allowed on the market in Canada, Australia, New Zealand, Japan, Israel and all European Union countries (currently numbering 27), by 2000 or earlier. In the United States, public opinion has caused a number of products and retailers to become rBST-free.
- In 2011, Breast Cancer Action joined with Pesticide Action Network in leading awareness efforts that resulted in the pesticide methyl iodide being removed from the California market. The use of methyl iodide as a fumigant has drawn concern. For example, 54 chemists and physicians contacted the U.S. Environmental Protection Agency (EPA) in a letter, saying "We are skeptical of U.S. EPA's conclusion that the high levels of exposure to methyl iodide that are likely to result from broadcast applications are 'acceptable' risks. U.S. EPA has made many assumptions about toxicology and exposure in the risk assessment that have not been examined by independent scientific peer reviewers for adequacy or accuracy. Additionally, none of U.S. EPA's calculations account for the extra vulnerability of the unborn fetus and children to toxic insults." A lawsuit was filed in 2011 challenging California's approval of methyl iodide. Subsequently, the manufacturer withdrew the fumigant and requested that California Department of Pesticide Regulation cancel its California registration, citing its lack of market viability.
