= List of Stonehill College alumni =

Stonehill College is a Catholic college in Easton, Massachusetts, United States. Following are some of its notable alumni.

== Business ==
- Keith Gill, 2009, financial analyst and investor
- Judith A. Salerno, 1973, former president and CEO of Susan G. Komen for the Cure
- Scott Thompson, former CEO of Yahoo and former president of PayPal

== Clergy ==
- Arthur Colgan, Roman Catholic auxiliary bishop of Chosica and titular bishop of Ampora

== Education ==
- Elizabeth Canuel, 1981, chemical oceanographer and chancellor professor of marine science at the College of William & Mary
- Michael DeSisto, founder of the DeSisto School
- Consolata Kabonesa,1984, Ugandan gender activist and associate professor at the School of Women and Gender Studies, Makerere University
- Robert Anthony Krieg, 1969, professor of theology at the University of Notre Dame, Indiana
- Nancy A. Monteiro-Riviere, 1976, toxicologist and regents distinguished research scholar and university distinguished professor at Kansas State University
- Ellen Sletten, 2006, chemist; John McTague Career Development Chair at University of California, Los Angeles
- John F. Stack, 1972, professor of politics, international relations, and law at Florida International University

== Entertainment ==
- Ryan Asselta, 1998, television sportscaster with Comcast Sports New England and Fox 5 in New York City
- Duke Castiglione, 1996, former ESPN SportsCenter host, current sports journalist for WNYW Fox 5 in New York City
- Garth Donovan, filmmaker and actor
- Doug McIntyre, 1979, novelist,radio talk host, television writer, and documentary filmmaker
- Patrick McKay, screenwriter and showrunner of the television show The Lord of the Rings: The Rings of Power
- Gerard O'Neill, 1964, investigative reporter and editor for The Boston Globe
- Butch Stearns, television and radio personality, former sports anchor for WFXT, and radio host for WEEI-FM

== Law ==
- Daniel F. Conley, district attorney for Suffolk County, Massachusetts 2002–2018
- David Finnegan, attorney, talk show host, and politician

== Literature ==
- Donna Denizé, poet and award-winning teacher at St. Albans School
- Dick Flavin, poet laureate of the Boston Red Sox
- Gerard O'Neill, 1964, investigative reporter for The Boston Globe who received the Pulitzer Prize for Investigative Reporting three times

== Military ==
- William P. Driscoll, 1968, decorated U.S. Navy flight officer, one of four American flying aces in the Vietnam War

== Politics ==
- Robert Britto, member of the Rhode Island Senate
- Marjorie Clapprood, member of the Massachusetts House of Representatives 1985–1991
- Claire D. Cronin, 25th U.S. ambassador to Ireland and member of the Massachusetts House of Representatives
- Peter Doucette, Canadian politician who served in the Legislative Assembly of Prince Edward Island 1989–1996
- Thomas P. Kennedy, former Massachusetts Senate and Massachusetts House of Representatives
- Meghan Kilcoyne, 2010, member of the Massachusetts House of Representatives
- Christopher Markey, member of the Massachusetts House of Representatives
- Brian J. McLaughlin, member of the Boston City Council
- Christy Mihos, Massachusetts businessman and politician
- Stephen J. Murphy, former Boston city councilor, Suffolk County Register of Deeds
- Michael Novak, United States ambassador to the United Nations Commission on Human Rights, philosopher, journalist, and novelist
- Robert L. Rice, 1970, member of the Massachusetts House of Representatives
- David Simas, 1992, lawyer, White House director of Political Affairs 2014–2016, CEO of the Obama Foundation

== Sports ==
- Ivan Almeida, 2012, professional basketball player
- Patrick Boen, 1989, college baseball coach
- Ed Cooley, 1994, head coach of the Georgetown Hoyas men's basketball and former head coach of the Providence College Friars men's basketball team
- Lou Gorman, 1953, general manager of the Boston Red Sox 1984–1993
- Andrew Jamiel, wide receiver for the Orlando Guardians of the XFL
- Larry Keating, 1966, college basketball coach and athletic director
- Chris Kraus, 2006, college basketball coach
- Will Moreton, 2020, professional basketball player
- Dan Muse, 2005, head coach of the Pittsburgh Penguins
- Jeremy Zielinski, professional soccer player
