= Roger Kahn =

American author (1927–2020)

- Born: October 31, 1927; New York City, U.S.
- Died: February 6, 2020 (aged 92); Mamaroneck, New York, U.S.
- Occupation: Author
- Writing career
- Notable work: The Boys of Summer

Roger Kahn (October 31, 1927 – February 6, 2020) was an American journalist and author, best known for his 1972 baseball book The Boys of Summer.

== Biography ==
Roger Kahn was born in Brooklyn, New York, on October 31, 1927, to Olga (née Rockow) and Gordon Jacques Kahn, a teacher and editor. His family was Jewish. He attended Froebel Academy, a prep school, then Erasmus Hall High School in Brooklyn. He attended New York University from 1944–1947.

In 2004, he was named as the fourth James H. Ottaway Sr. Visiting Professor of Journalism at SUNY New Paltz. He was a lecturer at Yale University, Princeton University, and Columbia University.

== Writing career ==
Kahn began his newspaper career in 1948, when he took a job as copy boy for the New York Herald Tribune. A keen Brooklyn Dodgers fan, he reported on their games over the 1952 and 1953 seasons. He became sports editor for Newsweek in 1956, and editor-at-large of the Saturday Evening Post in 1963. His best-known book is The Boys of Summer (1972), which examines his relationship with his father as seen through the prism of their shared affection for the Brooklyn Dodgers. In 2002, a Sports Illustrated panel placed The Boys of Summer second on a list of "The Top 100 Sports Books of All Time".

In addition to The Boys of Summer, Kahn wrote books such as Good Enough to Dream, a chronicle of his year as the owner of a minor league baseball franchise; The Era 1947–57, an examination of the decade during which the three New York clubs – the Dodgers, Yankees and Giants – dominated Major League Baseball; and Memories of Summer, a look back at his youth and early career, plus extended pieces on New York baseball legends Willie Mays and Mickey Mantle. He also wrote a biography of the heavyweight boxing champion Jack Dempsey, entitled A Flame of Pure Fire.

Kahn's 2006 book Into My Own is a memoir describing his friendships with Robert Frost, Jackie Robinson, Pee Wee Reese, Eugene McCarthy, and, in its last chapter titled Rescuing Roger, focuses on his son who predeceased him, Roger Laurence Kahn, who died by suicide via carbon monoxide poisoning in 1987. It covers the younger Kahn's bipolar disorder, heroin addiction, and time he spent with the educator Michael DeSisto at the DeSisto School; Andrew Ervin wrote in The Washington Post that the book "proves that Kahn's not only a great baseball writer but also something rarer: a great writer whose subject happens to be baseball."

Kahn cited as his journalistic influences, Stanley Woodward, John Lardner, and Red Smith.

== Honors, awards, distinctions ==
- Kahn was inducted into the National Jewish Sports Hall of Fame on April 30, 2006.
- He won the E. P. Dutton Award for best sports magazine article of the year five times.

== Personal life ==
Kahn married Joan Rappaport in 1950; they divorced in 1963. Their first child, daughter Elizabeth, died one day after her birth in 1954. Their son, Gordon Jacques, was born in 1957. Kahn married his second wife, Alice Lippincott Russell, in 1963; they divorced in 1974. They had a son, Roger Laurence, in 1964, and a daughter, Alissa Avril, in 1967. Their son, Roger, died by suicide in 1987.

Kahn lived in the Hudson Valley community of Stone Ridge, New York, with his third wife, Katharine Colt Johnson, a psychotherapist, whom he married in 1989.

Kahn died in Sarah Newman nursing home in Mamaroneck, New York, in February 2020, at the age of 92.

== Bibliography ==
- Mutual Baseball Almanac (1955), edited with Al Helfer
- The World of John Lardner (1961), edited
- Inside Big League Baseball (1962)
- The Passionate People: What it Means to be a Jew in America (1968)
- The Battle for Morningside Heights: Why Students Rebel (1970)
- The Boys of Summer (1972)
- How the Weather Was (1973)
- A Season in the Sun (1977)
- But Not to Keep: A Novel (1979)
- The Seventh Game (1982)
- Good Enough to Dream (1985)
- Joe & Marilyn: A Memory of Love (1986)
- Pete Rose: My Story (1989), with Pete Rose
- Games We Used to Play: A Lover's Quarrel with the World of Sport (1992)
- The Era: 1947–1957, When the Yankees, the Giants, and the Dodgers Ruled the World (1993)
- Memories of Summer: When Baseball was an Art and Writing About it a Game (1993)
- A Flame of Pure Fire: Jack Dempsey and The Roaring Twenties (1999)
- The Head Game: Baseball Seen from the Pitcher's Mound (2000)
- October Men: Reggie Jackson, George Steinbrenner, Billy Martin, and the Yankees' Miraculous Finish in 1978 (2002)
- Into My Own: The Remarkable People and Events That Shaped a Life (2006)
- Rickey & Robinson: The True, Untold Story of the Integration of Baseball (2014)
