= Pan-American Motor Company =

Defunct American motor vehicle manufacturer

- Founded: 1900; 126 years ago
- Founder: Albert C. Bostwick
- Defunct: 1903; 123 years ago
- Headquarters: Mamaroneck, New York, United States
- Products: Automobiles
- Production output: ~ 25 (1902-1903)
- Brands: Panam

The Pan-American Motor Company was an automobile manufacturer in Mamaroneck, New York, from 1902 to 1903.

== History ==
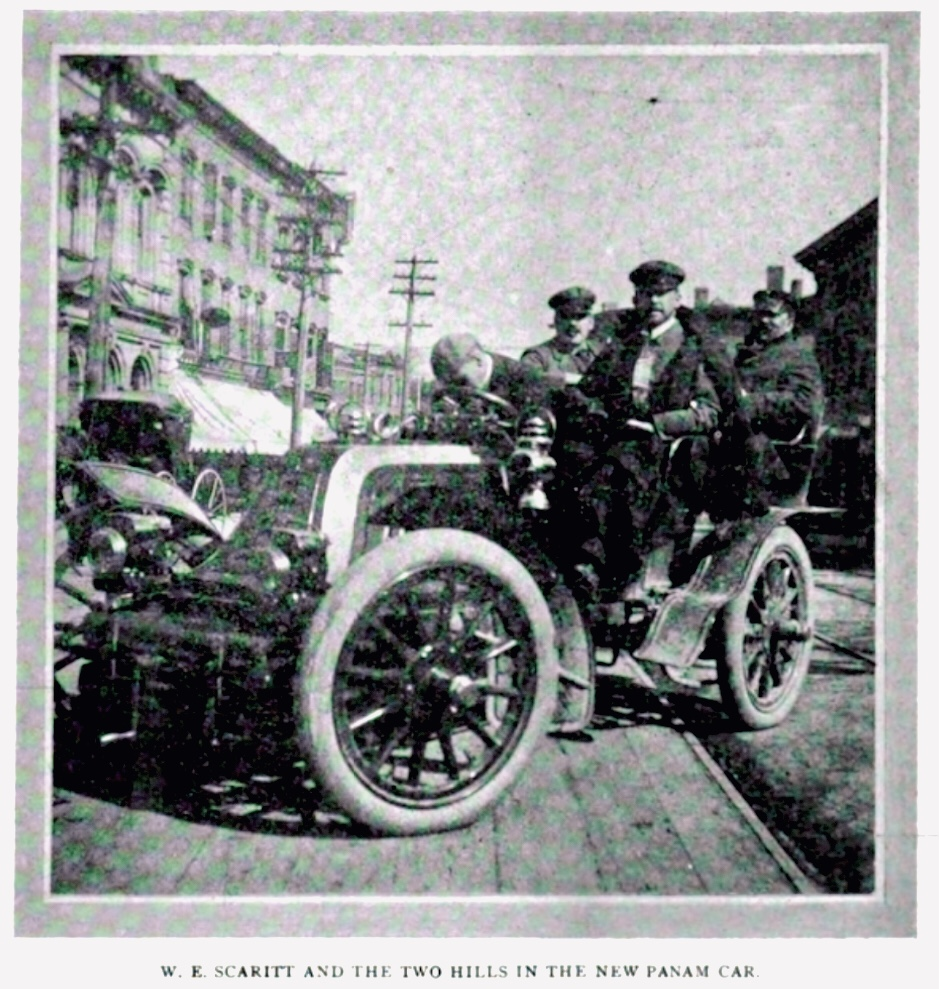
Panam Model B (1903)

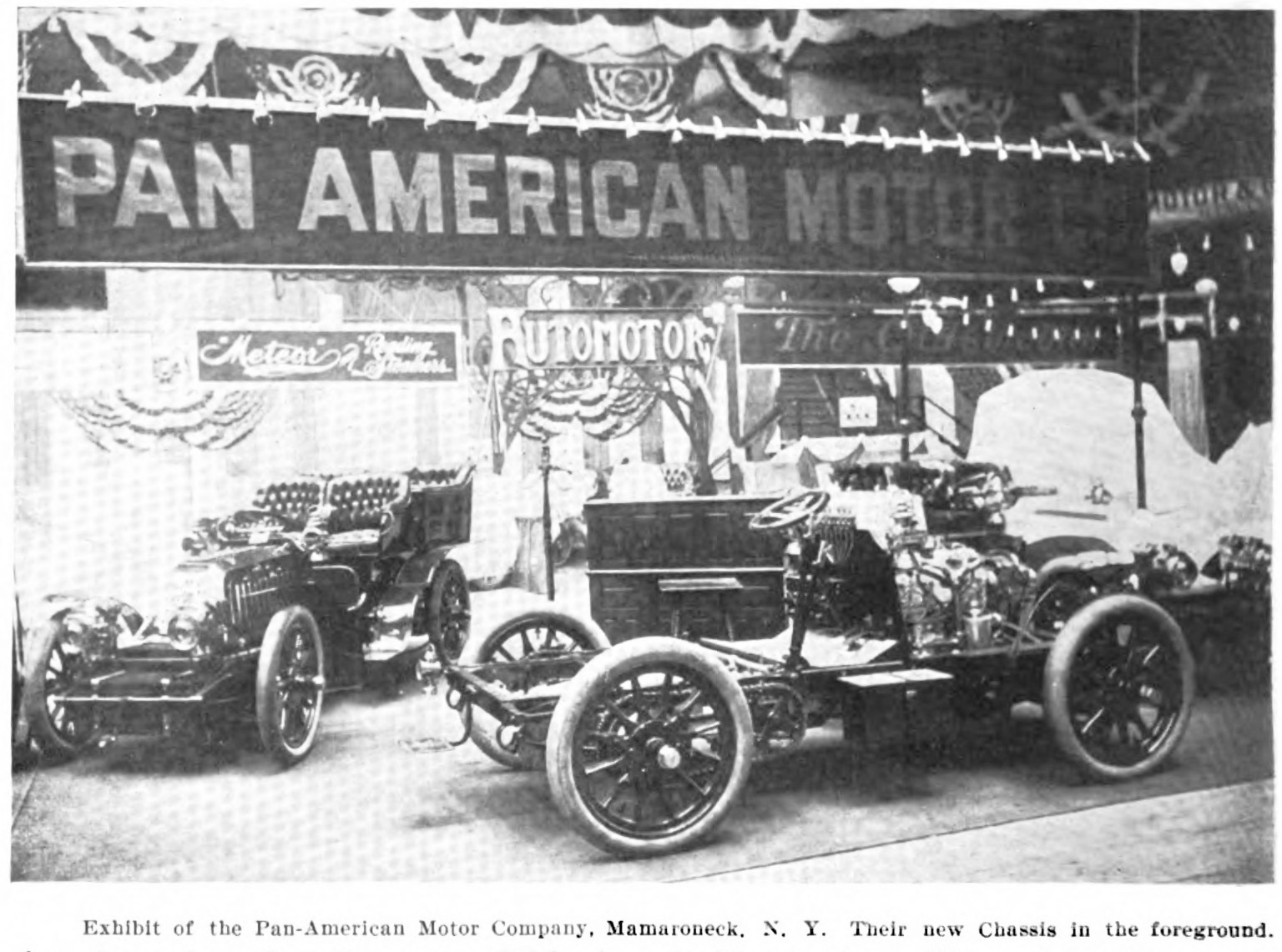
Panam-Chassis

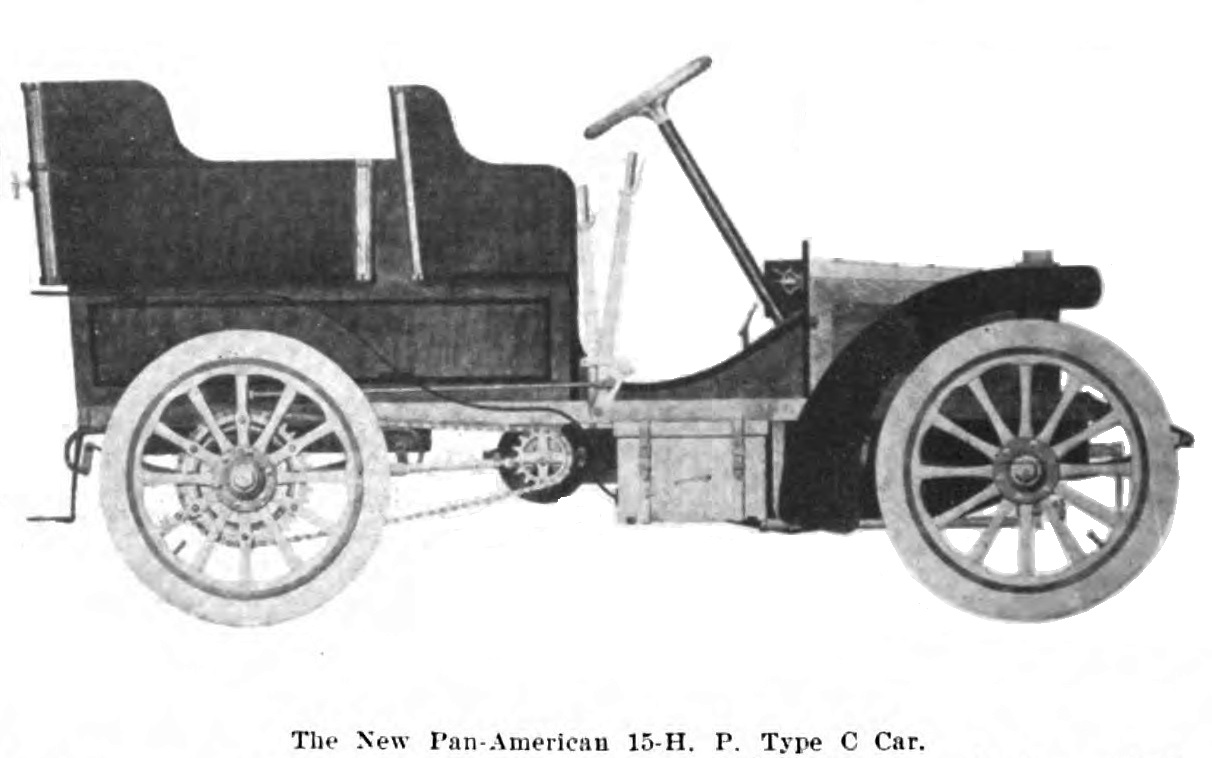
Panam 15 HP Model C (1903)

The company was founded in 1902 in Mamaroneck, in the U.S. state of New York. The main founder, Albert C. Bostwick, was able to attract financiers from Wall Street. James E. Woodbridge became the general manager, and William M. Power was the lead technical engineer. In 1903, the plant of the Automobile Company of America could be acquired. Also in 1903, production ended for unknown reasons. The Commercial Motor Company from New Jersey took over the factory facilities.

== Models ==
In 1902, only prototypes were produced.In 1903, two models with four-cylinder engines were released. The Model B had an engine with 25 horsepower and a wheelbase of 2440 mm. The Model C, with 15 horsepower, had a wheelbase of 2130 mm.

- Panam Model B
- Panam Model C

== See also ==
- List of defunct United States automobile manufacturers
- Veteran vehicles
