= Paul Babeu =

American politician

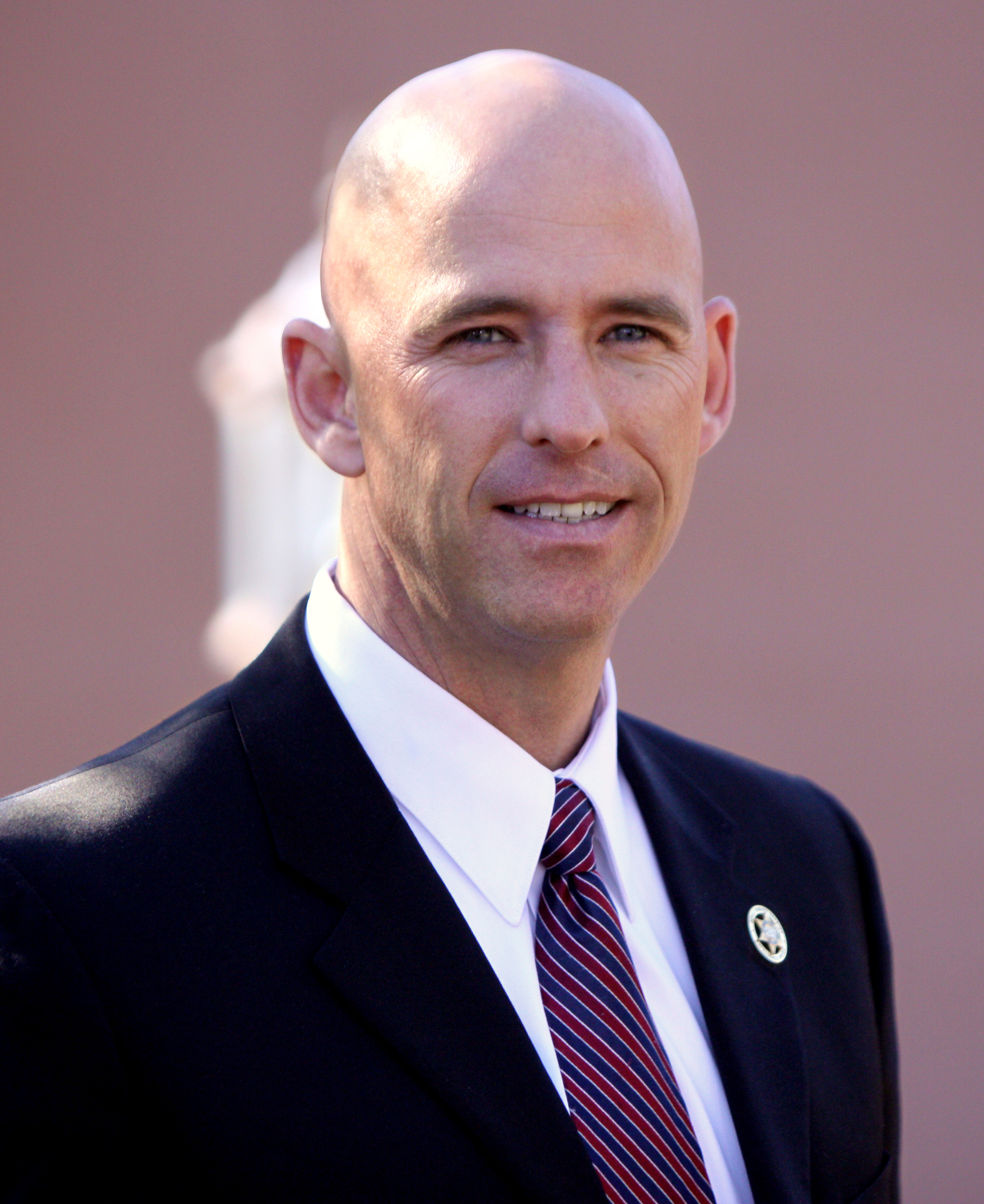
- Babeu in December 2011

Sheriff of Pinal County
- In office January 1, 2009 – January 1, 2017
- Preceded by: Chris Vasquez
- Succeeded by: Mark Lamb

Personal details
- Born: Paul Raymond Babeu; February 3, 1969 (age 57) North Adams, Massachusetts, U.S.
- Party: Republican
- Occupation: Law enforcement officer

Military service
- Allegiance: United States
- Branch/service: Massachusetts Army National Guard; Arizona Army National Guard
- Years of service: 1990–2010
- Rank: Major

Paul Raymond Babeu (pronounced BAB-you; born February 3, 1969) is an American law enforcement officer, politician and member of the Republican Party who was sheriff of Pinal County, Arizona, from January 1, 2009, to January 1, 2017. He was Pinal County's first Republican and first openly gay sheriff.

In 2012, Babeu ran to represent Arizona's 4th congressional district in the United States House of Representatives, challenging incumbent Republican Paul Gosar in the primary, but withdrew after he was accused of being lovers with an illegal immigrant. He later came out as gay, and successfully sought re-election as sheriff instead. In 2016, he was the Republican nominee for Arizona's 1st congressional district, losing to Democrat Tom O'Halleran.

== Early life and education ==
Babeu was born on February 3, 1969, in North Adams, Massachusetts, to Raymond and Helen Babeu. Raymond Babeu was a longtime employee of the area's electric utility who was also active in local politics. Paul Babeu was the tenth of eleven children born into the family. Babeu has spoken of being molested for several years as a child by at least two Catholic priests, including Richard R. Lavigne.

Babeu holds an associate degree in law enforcement from the Arizona Law Enforcement Academy. He also holds a bachelor's degree in history and political science from Massachusetts College of Liberal Arts and a summa cum laude master of public administration from American International College.

== Early career ==
=== Massachusetts politics ===
At age 17, while still in high school, Babeu campaigned against a proposed raise for North Adams, Massachusetts, City Council members. The council reduced the pay hike and Babeu, running as an independent, turned his effort into a successful campaign and was elected to City Council at the age of 18. In 1992, Babeu was elected to a four-year term as a Berkshire County, Massachusetts, commissioner.

At the end of this term in 1996, Babeu ran for a seat in the Massachusetts Senate based in Berkshire, Hampden, Hampshire, and Franklin. He won the Republican nomination against Peter Abair. He lost in the general election to Democrat Andrea F. Nuciforo, Jr. 55–42%.

In 1997, he ran for mayor of North Adams against incumbent Democrat John Barrett III. In the open primary, Babeu ranked first but failed to reach the 50% threshold. He led Barrett by just 145 votes. In the general election, Barrett won re-election and defeated Babeu 53%-47%, a difference of just 353 votes, in an election with an unusually high turnout rate of 75% among registered voters. In 2001, Babeu ran for a rematch against Barrett, but lost again.

=== DeSisto School executive ===
Babeu served as headmaster and later as executive director the DeSisto School in Stockbridge, Massachusetts, a school for troubled youths, from 1999 to 2001. The school closed in 2004, following the death of its founder Michael DeSisto. The school was in a long legal fight with the Commonwealth of Massachusetts over licensing, allegations of child abuse, a Commonwealth-imposed enrollment freeze, and accusations of failing to create a safe environment for its students. Court records show that problems at the school arose years before Babeu took over as headmaster. Babeu stated that he had never been the target of an investigation or lawsuit and "was recognized for helping restore financial stability of the school." Babeu was not named in any allegation during the investigation by the state.

=== National Guard ===
Babeu joined the Massachusetts National Guard as a 21-year-old. He started his service as a private and rose through the ranks to major in the Arizona Army National Guard. During his tenure he served a tour in Iraq and spent 17 months deployed in Arizona as a commander with Operation Jump Start (Southwest Border Mission). From 2006 to 2007, Babeu spent 17 months as commander of Task Force Yuma supervising 700 soldiers, where they supported the United States Border Patrol to achieve operational control and reduce illegal immigration. Babeu retired in September 2010 after 20 years of service.

=== Chandler patrolman ===
In 2002, he moved to Arizona to pursue a law enforcement career as a police officer for the city of Chandler, Arizona. He graduated from the Arizona Law Enforcement Academy as the #1 overall police recruit and was voted by his fellow officers as the class exemplary officer.

Babeu was awarded two Life Saving Medals in the performance of his duties as a patrolman in Chandler. Babeu served as the Police Association president for the Chandler Police Department and on the board of directors for the Arizona Police Association.

== Career as Pinal County Sheriff and runs for higher office ==
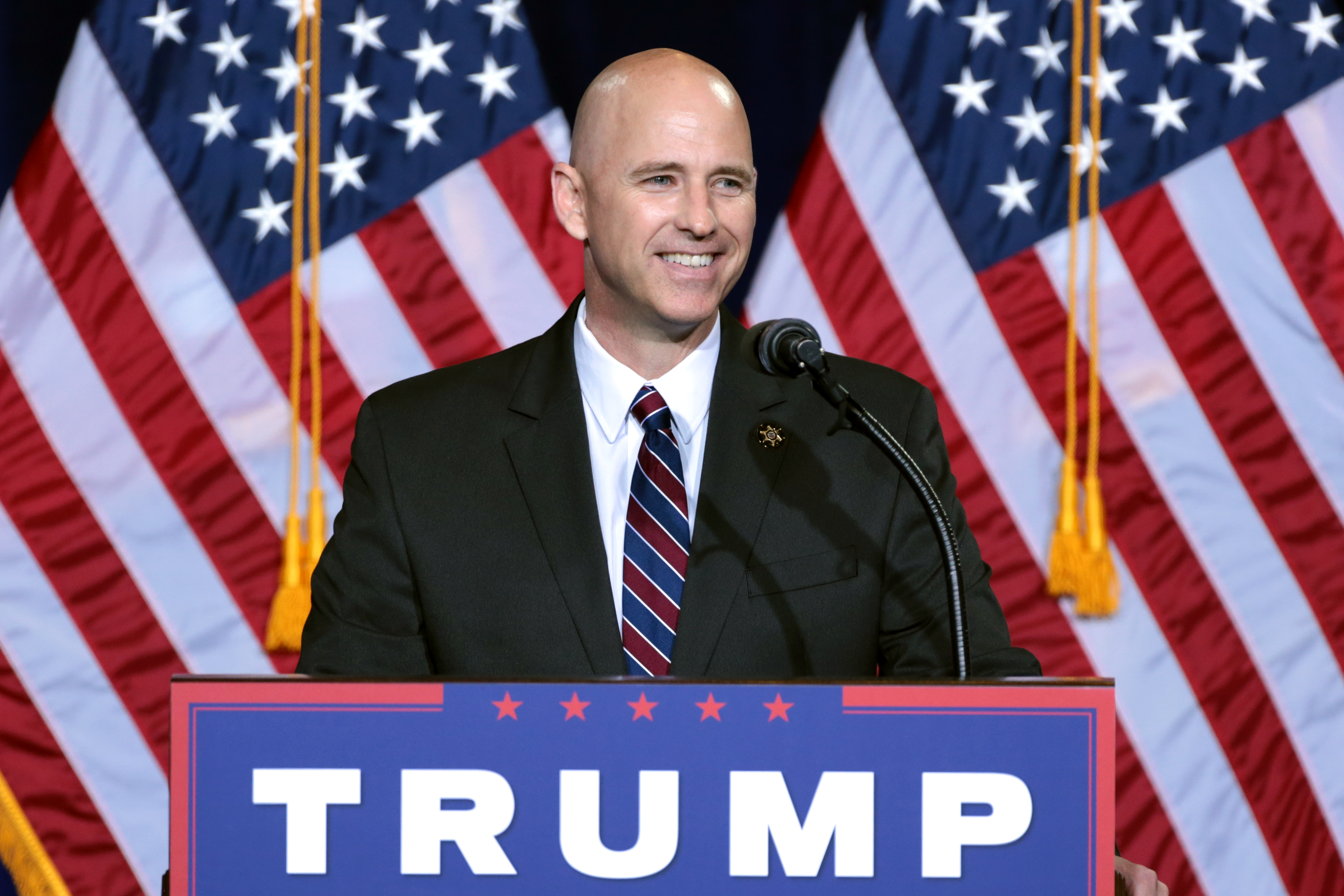
Babeu speaking at a campaign event for Republican presidential nominee Donald Trump on August 31, 2016.

Babeu campaigned for the office of Pinal County Sheriff in 2008 and defeated Democratic incumbent Chris Vasquez, 54% to 46%. He was the first Republican sheriff elected in the history of the county (founded in 1875). Babeu was reelected in 2012 with 53.3% of the votes, winning out over Democrat and independent candidates.

Babeu is vice president of the Arizona Sheriffs' Association and was named the National Sheriff of the Year in 2011 by the National Sheriffs' Association. Babeu led the third largest sheriff's office in Arizona with 700 full-time employees.

Babeu has been an outspoken critic of the federal government on the issue of illegal immigration. According to Babeu's website, "Pinal County is the number one pass through county in all of America for drug and human smuggling." He reported, "Pinal County contains an estimated 75-100 drug cartel cells and listening posts/observation posts, used to facilitate the illegal transportation of people and narcotics into the United States." Babeu also helped U.S. Senator John McCain and U.S. Senator Jon Kyl draft their "10-Point Border Security Plan".

In late 2010, Babeu was asked by Maricopa County sheriff Joe Arpaio to investigate allegations of wrongdoing in Arapaio's department. This 6-month-long detailed search led to the termination of Arpaio's top two deputies.

In 2011 and 2012, the Pinal County Sheriff's Office collected $7 million worth of surplus military equipment. Babeau said he intended to balance the department's budget by auctioning the equipment. After The Arizona Republic newspaper report, the Defense Logistics Agency directed Babeu "to retrieve vehicles and other equipment his office distributed to non-police organizations".

=== 2012 congressional election ===
On October 23, 2011, Babeu announced the formation of an exploratory committee to run for U.S. Congress in what would become Arizona's newly redrawn 4th congressional district. He ran against one-term representative Paul Gosar, who had been elected to the state's 1st congressional district in 2010.

The following February, Jose Orozco, who was an illegal immigrant, claimed that Babeu and Orozco had been lovers since meeting in 2006 on an online dating site. Orozco claimed that Babeu had known that he was an illegal alien while they were lovers, at odds with Babeu's views on immigration policy. After the relationship ended, Orozco claims that Babeu threatened Orozco with deportation to guarantee his silence. Orozco claimed his statements are documented in copies of email and SMS correspondence between Orozco and Babeu.

A spokesman for Babeu denied the allegations and described them as "sensationalist". The spokesman confirmed that Babeu would continue to run for U.S. Congress. Babeu came out as gay on February 18, 2012, saying that his sexual orientation was the only factual statement from the allegations. Babeu stepped down as co-chair of Mitt Romney's presidential campaign in Arizona, but received the continued support of U.S. Senator John McCain, who called Babeu his friend.

Babeu dropped his congressional bid on May 11, 2012; instead he sought re-election as sheriff. He was re-elected by a large margin on November 6, 2012.

On August 31, 2012, the Arizona solicitor general exonerated Babeu after an investigation. In a written statement, he wrote "The investigation determined that Babeu did not commit any criminal violations and further concluded that, although Orozco conducted himself in a manner that may constitute a violation of the law, there was no reasonable likelihood of conviction on anything more than a misdemeanor charge. It would be an inappropriate use of already-limited resources to prosecute Orozco for a misdemeanor."

=== 2016 congressional election ===
Babeu ran for Arizona's 1st congressional district in the 2016 elections. The district's incumbent representative, Democrat Ann Kirkpatrick, did not seek re-election as she instead ran for the U.S. Senate. On August 30, 2016, Babeu was declared the winner of the Republican primary. He faced Democrat Tom O'Halleran in the general election. O'Halleran defeated Babeu, receiving 51% of the vote to Babeu's 44%.

=== Departure from office ===
Babeu's tenure as sheriff ended on January 1, 2017, after his term expired. Republican Mark Lamb succeeded Babeu as sheriff.

Civic offices
Preceded by Chris Vasquez	Sheriff of Pinal County; 2009–2017	Succeeded by Mark Lamb
