= Otter Creek Preserve =

Nature reserve in New York, United States

- Otter Creek
- Location within New York
- Nearest city: Mamaroneck
- Coordinates: 40.95°N 73.72°W
- Area: 35 acres (14 ha)
- Established: 1974
- Governing body: Westchester Land Trust
- Website: westchesterlandtrust.org/preserves/otter-creek-preserve/

The Otter Creek Preserve is a protected area of salt marshes in Mamaroneck, New York. It was transferred to the Westchester Land Trust in 2015. The preserve contains about 90% of the productive salt marshes in Westchester County.

Otter Creek Preserve was designated a Geologic Area of Particular Concern by the New York State Department of Environmental Conservation in 1978. In 1984, a proposed housing development in Rye Neck was debated for its possible effects on the preserve.
