= Joel Simkhai =

Israeli-American tech entrepreneur (born 1976)

- יואל שמחאי
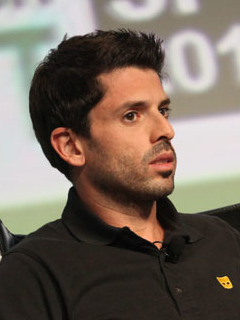
- Simkhai at TechCrunch Disrupt SF 2012
- Born: 1976 (age 49–50); Tel Aviv, Israel
- Education: Tufts University
- Occupation: Tech entrepreneur
- Known for: Founder and former CEO of Grindr and Blendr

Joel Simkhai (/sɪmˈkaɪ/; Hebrew: יואל שמחאי; born c. 1976) is an Israeli-American-French tech entrepreneur. He is the founder and former CEO of Grindr and Blendr. His original goal in starting Grindr was for people with similar interests to find new friends nearby.

In 2022, he launched a new "sex-positive," queer dating app called Motto with cofounder Alex Hostetler, hoping to regulate the "toxicity" and "discrimination" present on other apps. This app ceased operations in September 2024.

== Early life and education ==
Simkhai was born in Tel Aviv, Israel. His mother was a jeweler, and his father was a diamond dealer. When Simkhai was three years old, his family moved to New York City. He then grew up Mamaroneck, New York. While in high school, he says he dated women; he remarked that he was not being dishonest about his sexuality, but that his "coming out of the closet was a process". Before coming out, he would frequently seek out gay men to talk to on websites like CompuServe and AOL.

Simkhai received his Bachelor of Arts degree in International Relations & Economics from Tufts University in May 1998. After starting college, he came out to his parents and friends. He has two brothers, who are also gay. Simkhai owns several pieces of real estate, but primarily resides in New York. In 2021, Dave Keuning bought a mansion that Simkhai had owned in Outpost Estates in Los Angeles.

== Business career ==
After college, Simkhai worked in mergers and acquisitions. He conceived the idea of the app to answer the need to know "who else around you is also gay". While he started with little money or expertise, and never expected Grindr to become international, he became a multimillionaire CEO of an app with millions of users worldwide. Simkhai's early approach in regulating Grindr users was "laissez-faire", trusting the community to "manage itself." In 2014, Simkhai demonstrated that he was a user of his own app. He ceased including in his profile information regarding his role behind Grindr. In 2016, Simkhai sold a large stake in the app to the Chinese gaming company Beijing Kunlun Tech. In January 2018, he left Grindr after the company was fully sold to the latter company.

Simkhai is a charter member of the Young Presidents' Organization.

In 2022, Simkhai launched a mobile app called Motto for the gay and queer community. He labeled it as an attempt to "course correct" away from the negative aspects of already-existing gay dating apps. Simkhai acknowledged the "unintended consequences" of Grindr, including transphobia, sexual racism, and fat-shaming present on the platform. Motto required pictures of users’ faces on profiles to encourage positive interactions and identity verification. While this move drew criticism for excluding "down-low" or closeted men, the app was mainly geared toward out Queer people. The app also only allowed users to interact with ten other profiles per day, attempting to limit users’ screen time. The app then used artificial intelligence to regulate "bad behavior" on the app. The company was based in New York City, and was initially available only there and in Miami, Florida. According to its website, the app shut down in September 2024.

== Personal life ==
Simkhai was based in Los Angeles through 2015. Simkhai is Jewish. He was diagnosed with dyslexia as a child.

Simkhai expressed support for both Anderson Cooper and John Browne, as they came out or were outed as gay, calling them "role models."
