= Robert E. Will =

Robert Elsworth Will
- Born: September 16, 1908; Mamaroneck, New York, U.S.
- Died: December 11, 1999 (aged 91); South Kingstown, Rhode Island, U.S.
- Citizenship: United States
- Occupations: Academic, theater department founder and chairman
- Years active: Mid-20th century
- Known for: Founding chairman of Theater Department at University of Rhode Island
- Title: Professor of English, Theater Department Chair
- Spouse: Alice Aline Comeau
- Children: 2
- Parent(s): Edwin Robert Will and Minnie Helen (Brooks) Will

Academic background
- Education: University of Connecticut

Academic work
- Era: 20th century
- Discipline: English Literature, Theater Arts
- Institutions: University of Connecticut, University of Rhode Island
- Main interests: Theater education
- Military career
- Born: September 16, 1908; Mamaroneck, New York, U.S.
- Died: December 11, 1999 (aged 91); South Kingstown, Rhode Island, U.S.
- Allegiance: United States
- Branch: United States Army
- Service years: 1942–1946
- Rank: Captain
- Conflicts: World War II

Robert Elsworth Will (1908-1999) was an American academic at the University of Rhode Island who served as the founding chairman of the Theater Department. Will was born 16 September 1908 in Mamaroneck, New York to Edwin Robert Will and Minnie Helen (Brooks) Will. He attended the University of Connecticut and was married to Alice Aline Comeau on 24 June 1936 in West Hartford, Connecticut, and they had two sons, Allen and Christopher. Will began his career teaching English Literature at the University of Connecticut in the mid-1930s, and enlisted as a private in the U.S. Army on 1 December 1942 in Hartford. However, he was quickly promoted into the officers corps, serving in World War II until his discharge as a captain on 27 June 1946 at Fort Devens.

Shortly after discharge from the military in 1946, Will joined the University of Rhode Island as a professor of English. Will went on to be the founder of the Department of Theater where he served as department chairman through the 1950s until the 1970s. In recognition of Will's contributions to the department, the primary performance theater at the university was named in his honor. Will died on 11 December 1999 in South Kingstown, Rhode Island.
