= Mamaroneck Harbor (Long Island Sound) =

Bay in Westchester County, New York, United States

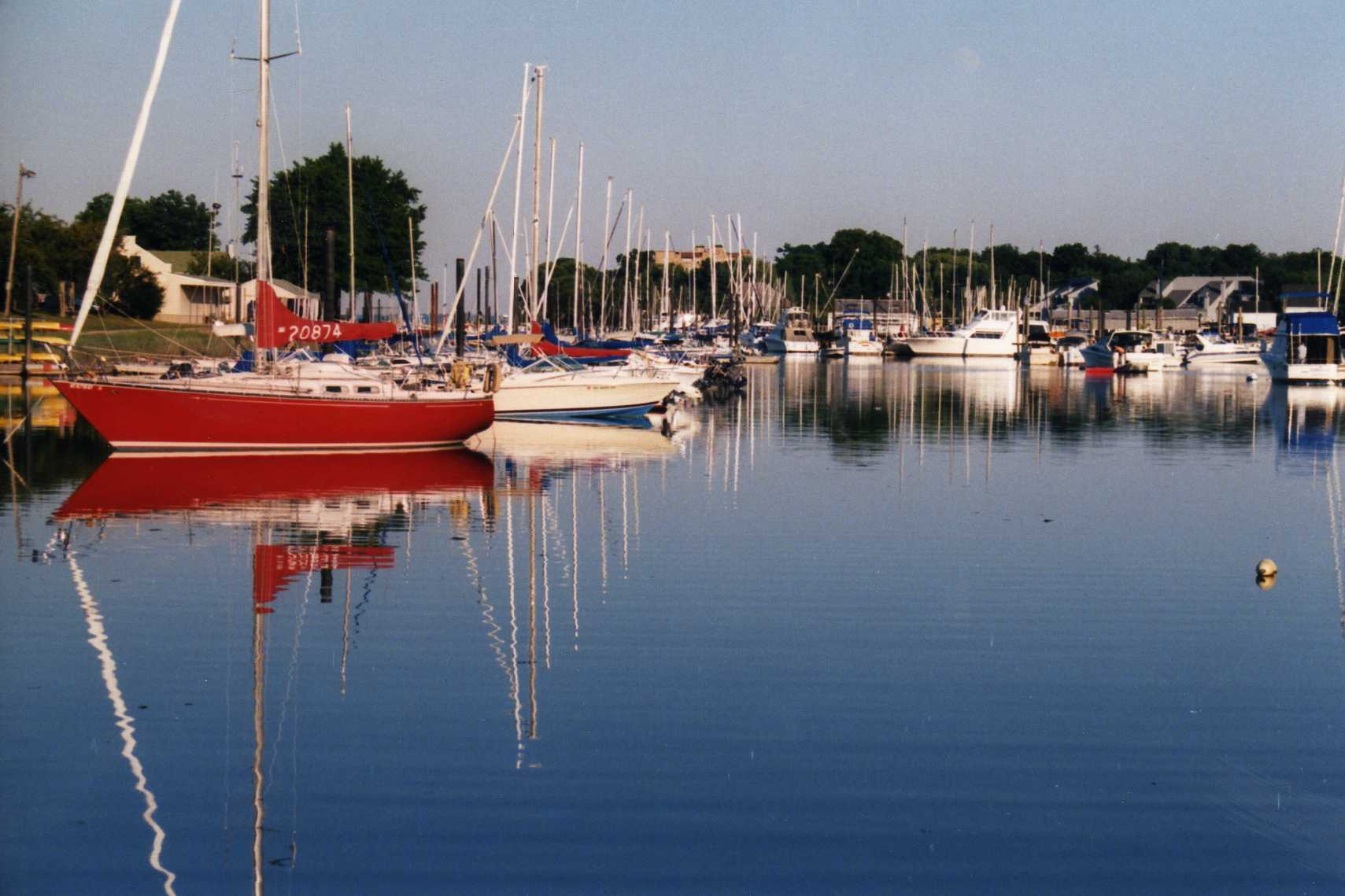
- The harbor with boats in it

- Location within New York
- Location: Mamaroneck, New York
- Coordinates: 40.9431261°N 73.7153974°W
- Islands: none

Mamaroneck Harbor is the name of a bay located in the village of Mamaroneck on the Long Island Sound, in Westchester County, New York. It is open to southerly winds but affords shelter against northerly winds for vessels drawing less than 10. The depth in the outer harbor is from 7 to 12 feet at low tide. Mamaroneck River is a shallow, and a stream or tidal inlet. The rocks in Mamaroneck Harbor rise abruptly, and some of them are bare at low tide.
