= The Boys of Summer (book) =

1972 book by Roger Kahn

- Cover to the first edition (Harper & Row, 1972).
- Author: Roger Kahn
- Language: English
- Genre: Non-fiction
- Publisher: Harper & Row
- Publication date: 1972
- Publication place: United States
- ISBN: 0-06-012239-0
- OCLC: 309382

The Boys of Summer is a 1972 non-fiction baseball book by Roger Kahn. After recounting his childhood in Brooklyn and his life as a young reporter on the New York Herald Tribune, the author relates some history of the Brooklyn Dodgers up to their victory in the 1955 World Series. He then tracks the lives of the players over the subsequent years as they aged. The title of the book is taken from the Dylan Thomas poem I See the Boys of Summer that describes "the boys of summer in their ruin".

== Players ==
The players who made up the core of the 1940s and 1950s Brooklyn Dodger teams and who were described by Kahn as the "Boys of Summer" were: Jackie Robinson, Gil Hodges, Roy Campanella, Duke Snider, Pee Wee Reese, Carl Erskine, Clem Labine, Carl Furillo, Joe Black, George Shuba, Andy Pafko, Preacher Roe, and Billy Cox.

Though not covered in the book, pitchers Don Newcombe and Johnny Podres, and outfielder Cal Abrams were also considered a core members of the "Boys of Summer".

Erskine, who died on April 16, 2024, was the last surviving member of the "Boys of Summer".

== Reception ==
Upon publication in 1972, The Boys of Summer was a commercial and critical success. It is often mentioned in discussions of the best baseball books, although some reviewers have criticized it for what they have perceived as excessive sentimentality.

Christopher Lehmann-Haupt wrote in his New York Times review that the book had "very real shortcomings" including "Mr. Kahn's unremitting tone of veneration, as if all his memories had been removed from the altars of the world's great cathedrals", but nevertheless found it to be "a book that succeeded for me despite almost everything about it."

In contrast to Lehmann-Haupt's criticism, Heywood Hale Broun, in his Chicago Times review, praised Kahn for vividly re-creating a romantic era in the history of American sports and culture through memories "so keen that those of us old enough can weep, and those who are young can marvel at a world where baseball teams were the center of a love beyond the reach of intellect, and where baseball players were worshipped or hated with a fervor that made bubbles in our blood."

George Frazier of The Boston Globe wrote "I cannot conceive that this year, nor next year, nor the year after that, will produce a more important book – a better written one, a more consistently engrossing one than this portrait of the Brooklyn Dodgers of the 1950s, as they were in the sinew and swiftness of their youth and as they are now."

Conversely, Los Angeles Times book critic David L. Ulin, while acknowledging that it is "perhaps the most celebrated baseball book of the last 50 years", omitted it from his own 2011 list of best baseball books, saying in agreement with Lehmann-Haupt that he found it "too sentimental, too sugary, when the Brooklyn Dodgers teams Kahn describes were anything but."

In the Los Angeles Times’ first-ever review of The Boys of Summer, Robert Kirsch alludes to the timelessness of the themes Kahn takes up through the lens of his own personal experiences, admitting "without embarrassment" that "this book brought me to tears more than once…and to laughter and to that quiet confrontation with enemy Time."

As of 2015, the book has reportedly sold about 3 million copies in ninety printings. In 2002, a Sports Illustrated panel placed The Boys of Summer second on a list of "The Top 100 Sports Books of All Time", describing it as "a novelistic tale of conflict and change, a tribute, a civic history, a piece of nostalgia and, finally, a tragedy."

A documentary based on the book, written by Marty Bell and narrated by Sid Caesar, was produced in 1983 and released direct-to-video.
