= James Lu =

American Internet entrepreneur

James F Lu
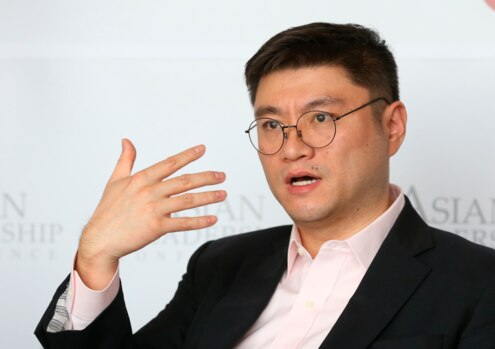
- Lu at Asian Leadership Conference 2019
- Education: University of Michigan; Bachelor of Science; Master of Science
- Known for: Founding Team of Chegg; Chairman of Grindr; Chairman of Joffre Capital
- Website: jamesflu.com

James Fu Bin Lu is an American Internet entrepreneur. He has been a serial entrepreneur and senior corporate executive in Amazon and Baidu. He has been the chairman of Grindr since 2020 and is a major investor in a number of high-profile technology companies globally.

== Biography ==
Lu received master's degrees in electrical engineering and computer science from the University of Michigan (graduating summa cum laude) and worked as an engineer for NASA's Jet Propulsion Laboratory, developing software for the Mars rover.

Lu was a founder of textbook rental company Chegg and social network Yoolin, serving as its CEO. Yoolin was acquired by zhanzuo.com in 2007.

After serving as the Global Head of Amazon Marketing Services (now known as Amazon Advertising), Lu was hired in June, 2015 by Baidu as vice president of content ecosystems. Lu left Baidu in 2017.

In late 2015, Lu drove a $88M USD investment into Kuaishou at $2.1B valuation and sat on the board of the company. In 2021, Kuaishou went public in HK Stock Exchange and the investment delivered $4.9B in profit (approximately 56 times return).

In 2020, Lu was a lead investor in the over $600 million acquisition of Grindr from Beijing Kunlun Tech Co. This transaction came about as a result of the decision by CFIUS to compel the owner of Grindr, a Shenzhen-listed Chinese company, to sell the company to US interests. In Nov 2022, the company went public in New York Stock Exchange. Lu's personal stake in the company is estimated to be worth $750m to 1.5B.

In 2021, Lu led a controlling acquisition of Investing.com from its founder and served as a director of the board. In July 2024, Lu stepped up and took the role of Executive Chairman of the company overseeing all parts of the business.

In Feb 2022, Lu was the leading investor in the acquisition of Coins.ph from GoTo and serving as a board member.
