= Grindr =

American LGBTQ social networking application

Grindr Inc.
- Grindr black logo
- Type: Public
- Traded as: NYSE: GRND
- Industry: Media; Communications
- Founded: March 25, 2009; 17 years ago in Los Angeles, California
- Founder: Joel Simkhai
- Headquarters: West Hollywood, California, U.S.
- Areas served: Worldwide
- Key people: James Lu (Chairman); George Arison (CEO)
- Products: Grindr (app); Gaymoji by Grindr; Bloop; Grindr for Equality
- Revenue: ▲US$440 million (2025)
- Net income: ▲US$94.8 million (2025)
- Website: grindr.com

Grindr (/ˈɡraɪndər/) is an American location-based social networking and online hookup application for LGBTQ people.

It was one of the first geosocial apps for gay men when it launched in March 2009, and has since become the largest and most popular gay mobile app in the world. It is available on iOS and Android devices in both free and premium versions (the latter called Grindr XTRA and Grindr Unlimited). As of September 2023, Grindr has approximately 13.5 million monthly active users.

The app allows users to create a personal profile and use their GPS position to place them on a cascade, where they can browse other profiles sorted by distance and be viewed by nearby and faraway users depending on one's filter settings. Selecting a profile photo in the grid view will display that user's full profile and photos, as well as the option to chat, send a "tap," send pictures, video call, and share one's precise location.

The app has been criticized over moderation, privacy, and safety issues, including its handling of racist and discriminatory content, including a former ethnicity filter that was removed in 2020 following complaints. It has also faced privacy and security concerns, including vulnerabilities that enabled users' precise locations to be identified through trilateration, and its of extensive sharing of user data (including HIV/AIDS status) with advertisers that resulted in a €10 million GDPR fine in Norway. Researchers and human rights groups have also raised concerns about the app's use by drug dealers, the risks it poses to younger users because of limited age verification in certain regions, and its exploitation by criminals and state authorities in anti-LGBTQ regimes to entrap, extort, or assault users. In addition, the company has faced allegations of unfair labor practices in the United States.

== History ==
=== Original ownership (2009–2015) ===
Grindr was launched as an iOS mobile app on March 25, 2009, by tech entrepreneur Joel Simkhai in Los Angeles, California. The free version displayed 100 profiles of nearby men, while a premium version ($2.99 plus a monthly fee) contained no advertising and broadened the dating pool to 200 men. Cautious but generally positive reviews of the app circulated through the gay blogosphere on sites such as Queerty and Joe My God. By August 2009, there were 200,000 total users in Grindr's network. By March 2010, there were 500,000.

For its first anniversary on March 25, 2010, Grindr released the app for BlackBerry devices.

In January 2011, Grindr won the iDate Award for Best Mobile Dating App.

On March 7, 2011, Grindr launched the app for Android devices. Along with a free version, users could pay $4.97 for a premium version called Grindr XTRA that featured no banner ads, more profiles to choose from, more "favorites," and push notifications of messages received while the app is running in the background.

In January 2012, a vulnerability in the app's security software enabled hackers to change the profile picture of a small number of primarily Australian Grindr users to explicit images. Grindr subsequently commenced legal action and made software changes that blocked the site responsible.

In January 2012, Grindr won TechCrunch's Crunchies Award for Best Location Application and two iDate Awards for Best Mobile Dating App and Best New Technology. In April 2012, Grindr won the About.com Readers' Choice Award for Best Dating App, after 74 percent of readers chose Grindr over Zoosk, SKOUT, Tagged, Tingle, and Are You Interested. In May 2012, the 2012 Webby Awards named Grindr an Official Honoree in its "Social (Handheld Devices)" category. Fewer than 15% of entries submitted to the Webby Award committee that year received the Official Honoree distinction, which recognizes the best in Internet content, services, and commerce.

On June 18, 2012, Grindr announced that it had officially hit 4 million registered users in 192 countries across the globe.

On July 22, 2012, after Grindr experienced a technical outage, British tabloid The People (now The Sunday People) reported that Grindr's crash was due to the volume of usage upon the arrival of Olympic athletes in London for the 2012 Summer Olympics looking for hook-ups. The report caused rumors to circulate regarding the athletes' potentially scandalous sexual behavior. Grindr quashed the rumors the next day and blamed the outage on technical issues not related to server demand.

In August 2013, Grindr released an updated version of the app requiring users to verify their accounts by providing a valid email address. Grindr says this was done to reduce spam and improve portability. Critics argued it stripped the app of its anonymity.

On September 30, 2013, Grindr introduced Grindr Tribes, allowing users to identify themselves with a niche group and filter their searches to better find their type. Grindr Tribes include: Bear, Clean-Cut, Daddy, Discreet, Geek, Jock, Leather, Otter, Poz, Rugged, Trans, and Twink. In addition to Tribes, Grindr users could now filter by Looking For.

As of Grindr's fifth anniversary on March 25, 2014, the app was averaging more than 5 million active monthly users worldwide.

=== After acquisition (2016–2019) ===
In January 2016, Grindr announced that it had sold a 60% stake in the company for $93 million to a Chinese video game development firm, Kunlun Tech Co Ltd (formerly Beijing Kunlun Tech Co Ltd). In January 2018, Kunlun purchased the remainder of the company for $152 million.

In March 2018, Grindr introduced a new feature that, if opted into, sends the user a reminder every three to six months to get an HIV test.

In August 2018, the Kunlun executive board granted permission for an initial public offering for Grindr. In March 2019, Kunlun started seeking for a buyer of Grindr after the Committee on Foreign Investment in the United States (CFIUS) had informed Kunlun that having the app owned by a Chinese company posed a national security risk. This also led Kunlun to halt its plans for an IPO for Grindr.

In July 2019, Grindr released Grindr Unlimited, a new premium version of the app that allows subscribers to unsend messages, go Incognito, see unlimited profiles in the cascade, see who has viewed them, see typing status, and use all the premium features of Grindr XTRA. In November 2019, Grindr launched Grindr Web, a free desktop version of the app built for users who prefer to chat from their computer or laptop. Designed for "quick and discreet" chat while at the office, it employs a generic email interface and mimics computer file folders in place of user profiles. This service has since been made a feature of the paid version, Grindr Unlimited.

=== Divestiture and public listing (2020–present) ===
In March 2020, Kunlun announced that it would sell its 98.59% stake in Grindr to U.S.-based San Vicente Acquisition LLC for $608.5 million. Grindr's senior management and core employees would continue to hold 1.41% of the company's shares after the transaction. Towards the end of the same year, Grindr was reported to have about 13 million monthly users.

Grindr announced it will go public via SPAC in May 2022. This came to fruition in November 2022, when Grindr went public on the New York Stock Exchange.

In May 2023, Grindr relaunched Grindr Web limited only to XTRA and Unlimited subscribers. In August 2023, Grindr mandated that all remote workers—including workers that were specifically hired with a "remote worker" designation—relocate to hub cities in New York, Chicago, Los Angeles, San Francisco and Washington D.C., providing workers with only two weeks advance notice to comply. By September 2023, 46% of Grindr's 178 workers either quit or were terminated due to non-compliance with the company's return to in-office work policy, in a damaging blow to employee retention. The Communications Workers of America (CWA) protested that the mandate was in response to employees' effort to organize a union, and in response, they filed two lawsuits alleging unfair labor practices with the US National Labor Relations Board.

In 2025, Grindr tested gAI (pronounced gay-eye), with six A.I. features, intended for a premium version of the app.

== Original content ==
=== Into ===
In August 2017, Grindr launched its own in-house digital magazine, Into, which focused on queer media and culture. It won journalism awards from the NLGJA and Transgender Legal Defense and Education Fund. Into was notable for featuring nonwhite, non-cisgender queer people in its programming, unlike much legacy queer media. Into started the same year as Them, and both were seen as younger, hipper, and more diverse alternatives to older magazines like The Advocate and Out.

Into has been noted for publishing an article in November 2018, criticizing Grindr president Scott Chen for comments he made on marriage equality that have been characterized as homophobic. Two weeks after the article was released, Grindr's head of communications, Landon Rafe Zumwalt, stepped down in protest against Chen's remarks. Into's managing editor, Zach Stafford, left a week later, without commenting on his reasons for leaving. In January 2019, Grindr laid off the editorial staff of Into, citing a desire to "[shift] our focus to video content". The staff disputed this reasoning, claiming the video team had also been dismissed.

Into was revived in May 2021 by LGBTQ digital media company Q.Digital.

=== Bridesman ===
In March 2021, it was announced that Grindr was stepping into the "original scripted content space" with a debut web series titled Bridesman. The series, created by John Onieal and directed by Julian Buchanan, went into production the same month and made its world premiere at the Outfest Film Festival on August 14, 2021. The series consists of six episodes and stars Jimmy Fowlie, Sydnee Washington and Shanon DeVido. The show was co-written by John Onieal and Frank Spiro, and produced by Jeremy Truong and Katie White under Truong's company rubbertape.

=== Who's The Asshole? ===
In 2024, Grindr launched "Who's The Asshole?", a podcast hosted by drag queen Katya Zamolodchikova. Season 1 guests include Orville Peck, Jordan Firstman, Trace Lysette and Saucy Santana. Season 2 guests include Adam Lambert, Cosmo Lombino, Gottmik, Bowen Yang, Brandon Kyle Goodman and Evan Ross Katz. Season 3 guests include Lisa Rinna, Christian Cowan, Gus Kenworthy, Zachary Zane, Megan Stalter, Joel Kim Booster and Jordy Shulman.

=== Host or Travel ===
In 2024, Grindr launched its "Host or Travel" online travel series, which explores gayborhoods around the world.

Locations have included:

- Madrid, Spain
- Rio de Janeiro, Brazil
- Los Angeles, United States
- Playa Zipolite, Mexico
- Berlin, Germany
- Malta

== Grindr for Equality ==
In February 2012, Grindr formed Grindr for Equality (G4E), a geotargeted political service designed to raise awareness of LGBT equality issues. Ahead of the 2012 U.S. elections, it encouraged users to register to vote and provided information about pro-LGBT candidates in their areas.

G4E has since evolved into an international LGBTQ health and human rights program. In November 2019, it granted a total of $100,000 to organizations and activists providing direct services and advocacy to the LGBTQ communities in the Middle East and North Africa.

== Censorship ==
No Grindr safety measures or government restrictions were taken Only Grindr safety measures were taken Government restrictions were enforced (can be bypassed with VPN) Unavailable due to government bans or US government sanctions No data

Grindr is not available in the following territories due to government bans or US government sanctions and delisted from the app store: Afghanistan, China, Crimea, Cuba, Iran, Libya, Maldives, Morocco, Syria, North Korea, Saudi Arabia, Sudan and the United Arab Emirates. Furthermore, there are also restrictions in whole or in part in these countries: Indonesia, Jordan, Malaysia, Lebanon, Qatar, Turkey and Pakistan.

In December 2019, Grindr took measures to protect users in countries in which they may be at risk for being LGBTQ, unveiling new security features for them and automatically disabling their distance feature.

In July 2025, Grindr introduced age verification system in the United Kingdom, in order to comply with Online Safety Act 2023.

== Criticism ==
=== Offensive speech and actions ===
In the early 2010s, Grindr was criticized for not taking sufficient action to moderate the display of racist language by some of its users. In June 2014, when asked about hateful speech on Grindr, the app's creator Joel Simkhai said in an interview with the Israeli newspaper Haaretz that he "didn't like it" but he "[isn't] a sixth grade teacher" and it "[isn't his] job to police such things."

The app was criticized in the past for allowing users to sort users by ethnicity, which some thought was discriminatory. This was removed in June 2020, following social media complaints.

=== Drug dealing ===
Grindr has also found applications in drug dealing, prompting the app developer to take actions on some emojis.

=== User location trilateration ===
In August 2014, it was reported that Grindr's relative distance measurements could facilitate trilateration, thereby pinpointing individual users' near-exact location. A proof of concept was published, and more than 2 million detections were performed within a few days. Authorities in Egypt allegedly used the app to track and arrest gay men. Grindr responded by temporarily disabling distance display globally.

In May 2016, a group of computer scientists from Kyoto University demonstrated how location pinpointing is still possible in the app even when a user is hiding their distance from public display. By exploiting a novel attack model called colluding-trilateration, locating any targeted user becomes a very easy and cheap task without employing any special hacking technique. The attack model works with any location-based service app that shows profiles of nearby users in order of proximity, not just Grindr.

In May 2022, it was reported that Grindr's user location data has been collected and sold through a digital advertising network since 2017, before Grindr curtailed data sharing with its advertising partners in 2020. Historical data from this period may still be obtainable.

=== User data privacy ===
In April 2018, SINTEF – a Norwegian non-profit research organization – reported that Grindr's data bundles sold to third-party companies could potentially contain some users' sensitive personal information such as HIV/AIDS status and HIV testing dates. The discovery generated widespread scrutiny of Grindr's privacy practices. In response, Grindr released a statement stating "Grindr has never sold, nor will we ever sell, personally identifiable user information – especially information regarding HIV status or last test date – to third parties or advertisers. As an industry standard practice, Grindr does work with highly-regarded [software] vendors to test and optimize our platform. These vendors are under strict contractual terms that provide for the highest level of confidentiality, data security, and user privacy."

On January 14, 2020, a report was published by the Norwegian Consumer Council which alleged that Grindr had violated the European Union's General Data Protection Regulation (GDPR) rules. The council asserted that Grindr sent user data to at least 135 advertisers. The main concerns of the allegations were for sharing personal information, including users' locations and information about their device. These details could potentially indicate the sexual orientation of a user without their consent. After review from the Norwegian Data Protection Authority, it was ruled that Grindr was in violation of the GDPR and fined €10 million.

In October 2020, a security researcher discovered a vulnerability in the password reset process. Anyone was able to take over an account using only the email address.

In April 2024, Grindr was the subject of a lawsuit lodged at the High Court in London for mishandling user data, including the use of "covert tracking technology" and sharing sensitive user data – including HIV status – with third party analytics companies. In September 2026, Grindr agreed to pay £26 million to settle the lawsuit, which had been brought on behalf of 12,000 UK users.

=== Risk to minors ===
Research has estimated that around half of sexually active gay and bisexual adolescents use applications like Grindr. Grindr does not verify users' ages in the United States, where it is not required to do so under Section 230 of the Communications Decency Act. In countries that require age verification, such as the United Kingdom under the Online Safety Act 2023, users must verify their ages.

Grindr CEO George Arison has argued that age verification should instead be handled by Apple's App Store and Google Play, saying app stores already possess the information needed to confirm users' ages. He said the UK requirements increased compliance costs and led around 7% of the app's UK monthly active users to stop using the service because they were unwilling to provide personal information directly to a dating app. Grindr unsuccessfully lobbied the UK government to adopt an app store-based verification model before the rules came into force.

=== Labour union complaint ===
In 2023, the Communications Workers of America (CWA) filed two lawsuits alleging unfair labor practices with the US National Labor Relations Board.

=== Violent ambushes ===
The use of fake profiles on Grindr by homophobic predators to entrap and assault LGBTQ people is common in various countries.

In February 2020, Melbourne man Jack Jacobs was lured through Grindr to a meeting near Fitzroy Gardens, where he was assaulted by a group of approximately eight or nine teenagers. Jacobs was hospitalised with facial, wrist and knee injuries; the attackers were never identified. In 2025, Jacobs appeared on the Australian television program The Project to discuss the attack and the broader issue of anti-LGBTQ violence facilitated through dating apps.

A 2023 report by Human Rights Watch documents the widespread use of fake profiles on digital platforms like Grindr, by police to entrap, extort money from, or physically torture LGBTQ people in Egypt, Iraq, Jordan, Lebanon, and Tunisia.

== See also ==
- List of LGBTQ social networking services
- Timeline of online dating
- Homosocialization
- Tinder
- Blendr
- Spoonr
- Stephen Port, known as The Grindr Killer
