= Judith A. Salerno =

American physician and college president

Judith A. Salerno, MD, MS is a physician executive and the President of the New York Academy of Medicine.

== Career ==
=== The New York Academy of Medicine ===
Salerno became President of The New York Academy of Medicine in September 2017. During her tenure she honed the organizational focus on health equity and introduced progressive initiatives such as a Health Equity Action Agenda, taking a stand in support of the removal of the J. Marion Sims statue, and awarding posthumous fellowship to the eminent physician and abolitionist Dr. James McCune Smith, an 1847 candidate who was denied NYAM fellowship due to race.

In 2020 at the height of the first wave of COVID-19 in New York City, Salerno came out of clinical retirement to volunteer full time at NYC Health + Hospitals/Bellevue while continuing to serve as President at The New York Academy of Medicine.

=== Susan G. Komen for the Cure ===
Previously she served as the president and CEO of Susan G. Komen for the Cure, replacing Nancy Brinker as CEO from September 2013 to December 2016. Her early work addressed bringing in a younger generation of donors, streamlined financial systems, and overhauled training and affiliate programs. She launched an unprecedented $27 million, 10-city initiative to reduce white-Black disparities in breast cancer mortality.

=== Institute of Medicine (currently National Academies of Medicine) ===
Salerno served as the Leonard D. Schaeffer Executive Officer of the Institute of Medicine (IOM) of the National Academies from January 2008 to September 2013. As executive director and chief operating officer she oversaw the IOM's research and policy programs and guiding the Institute's operations on a daily basis.

While at the IOM, Salerno led the collaboration with HBO Documentary Films on production of The Weight of the Nation, a four-part series and large-scale public health campaign presented by HBO and the Institute of Medicine in association with the CDC, NIH, Michael & Susan Dell Foundation and Kaiser Permanente. The series was nominated for two Emmy awards.

=== National Institute on Aging (NIA) ===
Salerno was Deputy Director of the National Institute on Aging (NIA) at the National Institutes of Health of the United States Department of Health and Human Services from August 2001 through January 2008. She oversaw over $1 billion in aging research conducted and supported annually by the Institute, including research on Alzheimer's and other neurodegenerative diseases, frailty, and function in late life, and the social, behavioral, and demographic aspects of aging. Earlier in her career, Salerno also served as Senior Clinical Investigator, implementing research protocols for patients with Alzheimer's and hypertension. While at NIH, she served on active duty as a Captain in the Research Officers' Group in the Commissioned Corps of the U.S. Public Health Service.

=== United States Department of Veterans Affairs ===
From 1996 to 2001 Salerno directed the continuum of Geriatrics and Extended Care programs across the nation for the United States Department of Veterans Affairs. While at the VA, she launched national initiatives for pain management and improving end-of-life care. Prior to this appointment, Salerno was Associate Chief of Staff at the VA Medical Center in Washington, D.C., where she developed and implemented new approaches to geriatric primary care and coordinated area-wide geriatric medicine training. Salerno also co-founded the Washington, D.C. Area Geriatric Education Center Consortium, a collaboration of more than 160 educational and community organizations within the Baltimore-Washington region. The consortium generated educational opportunities for professionals serving the aging.

=== Board of Directors and Advisory Roles ===
Salerno has served on numerous boards and national committees, concerned with health care issues ranging from the quality of care in long-term care to the future of the geriatric workforce, and currently serves as an advisor to several other national organizations including the USC Leonard D. Schaeffer Center for Health Policy & Economics, Pierian Biosciences, New York-Presbyterian Dalio Center for Heath Justice, and the Healthy US Collaborative. She was appointed to the New York State Taskforce on Maternal Mortality and Disparate Racial Outcomes, the New York City Age-friendly Commission, NYC Department of Health and Mental Hygiene Advisory Council, and the Lancet Commission on Global Access to Palliative Care, among others.

== Education ==
Salerno earned her M.D. from Harvard Medical School in 1985 and a Master of Science degree in health policy from the Harvard School of Public Health in 1976. She received a bachelor's degree in history from Stonehill College in 1973. She also holds a Certificate of Added Qualifications in Geriatric Medicine and was Associate Clinical Professor of Health Care Sciences and of Medicine at the George Washington University until 2001. She raised her 3 children in Great Falls, Virginia.

== Awards and honors ==
- Elected member, National Academy of Medicine, 2018
- Elected Fellow, The New York Academy of Medicine, 2017
- Meritorious Service Award, U.S. Department of Veterans Affairs, 2001
- NIH Director's Award, 2003, 2005, 2008
- Surgeon General's Crisis Response Service Award, U.S. Public Health Service, 2006
- Crain's New York Notable Women in Health Care, 2018, 2019
- City & State Health Power 50, New York State, 2019, 2021, 2022
- National Organization of Italian American Women, 2019 National Honoree
- Harvard T.H. Chan School of Public Health Award of Merit, 2020
- Community Service Award, Crohn's and Colitis Foundation of Greater Washington D.C, 2020
- Doctor of Humane Letters (hon.), Stonehill College, 2021

== See also ==
- Harvey V. Fineberg, President of the Institute of Medicine
- Institute of Medicine
