= Jordy (American singer) =

American singer

- Born: Jordan Shulman
- Genres: Pop
- Occupation: Singer-songwriter
- Years active: 2016–present
- Labels: 300 Entertainment; EMPIRE
- Website: www.jordymusic.com

Jordan Shulman, known by his stage name as Jordy (stylized as JORDY), is an American singer-songwriter.

== Biography ==
Jordan Shulman was born in Northbrook, Illinois. His grandfather was educational psychologist Lee Shulman. He performed theater there while attending high school. He attended Boston University where he earned a degree in literature.

One of his first releases was the song "Be With Me". Released in 2018, the song was later signed and distributed by Armada Music. He later released the song "Just Friends" which premiered on Billboard. He released his first album, Mind Games, in 2021. In 2023, Jordy released the single "Story of a Boy". The song was influenced by "Absolutely (Story of a Girl)", a song by the rock band Nine Days, who also collaborated with him in the music video for the song. The song is part of his album Boy, released in 2023.

In 2023, he was nominated for Outstanding Breakthrough Music Artist from GLAAD Media Award as well as nominations by Queerty Awards and iHeartRadio Music Awards. He has also made appearances on The Kelly Clarkson Show, the Today show, and Late Night With Jimmy Fallon.

== Discography ==
=== Albums ===
- 2021, Mind Games
- 2023, Boy
- 2024, Sex With Myself
- 2026, In Retrospect

=== EPs ===
- 2016, Ribbons
- 2019, Welcome to the Friend Zone
- 2020, Psycho
- 2020, Better By Myself
- 2021, Long Distance

=== Singles ===
- 2017, "Gotta Leave"
- 2018, "Be With Me"
- 2018, "Just Friends"
- 2018, "Somebody Else"
- 2019. "Stay Together"
- 2019, "Irrational"
- 2019, "These Days"
- 2019, "Everybody's Falling in Love (But Not Me)"
- 2019, "Close To You"
- 2019, "Tuck Your Head Under the Covers"
- 2019, "All Good"
- 2020, "Is It Love?"
- 2020, "High Score"
- 2021. "Better In My Head"
- 2021, "Till It Hurts"
- 2021, "Summer in Brooklyn"
- 2021, "If He’s In Your Bed"
- 2021, "South Dakota"
- 2022, "Friends" (with emma løv and Loote)
- 2022, "Dry Spell"
- 2022, "IDK SH!T"
- 2022, "i get high" (feat. Joy Oladokun)
- 2023, "Story of a Boy"
- 2023, "Things Change"
- 2024, "SECOND MINUTE HOUR"
- 2024, "NICE THINGS"
- 2025, “COULDA NOT”
