= Consolata Kabonesa =

Ugandan gender activist

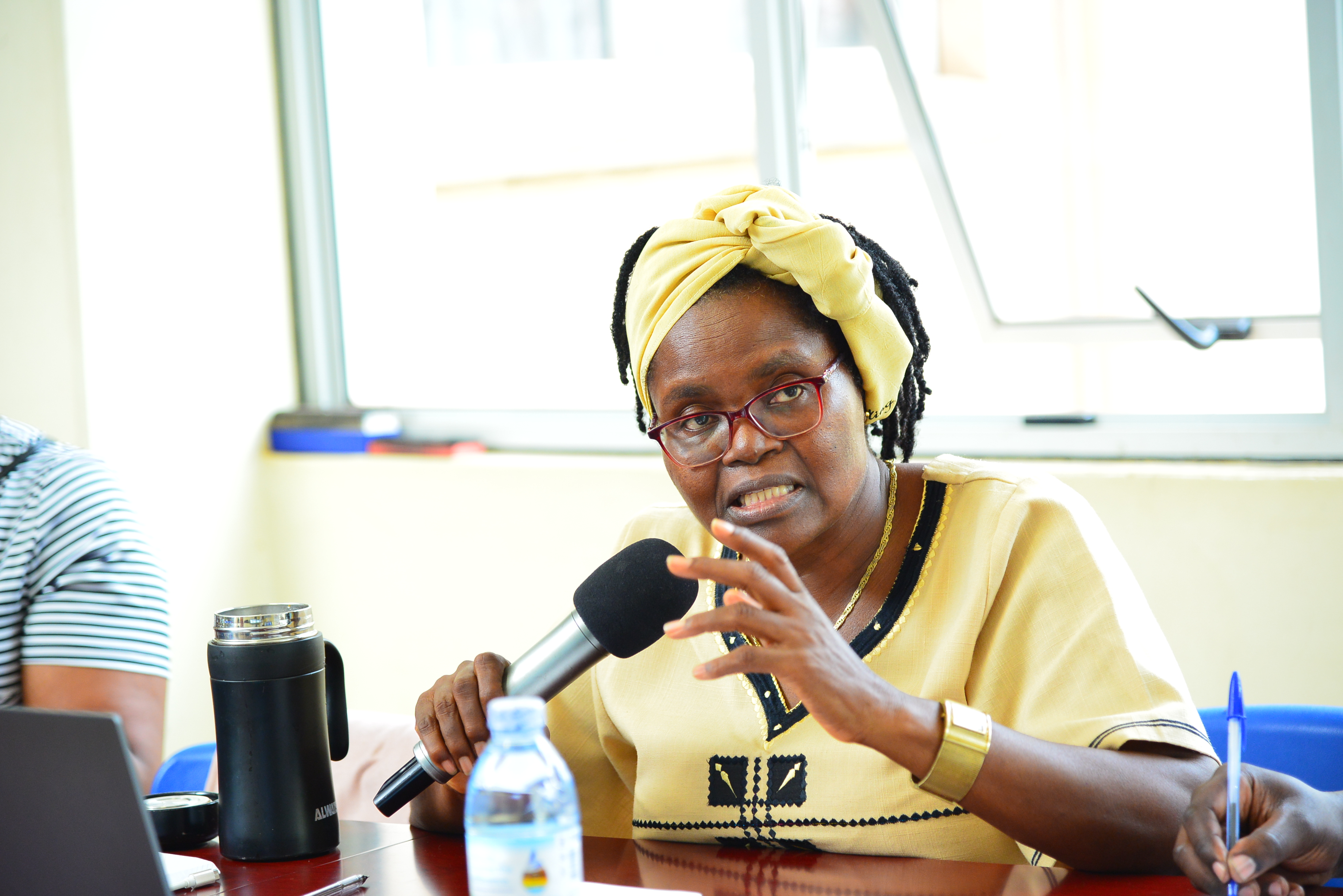
- Education: Makerere University
- Occupation: Senior Lecturer

Consolata Kabonesa is an Ugandan gender activist with a specialised experience in the women and gender programming, gender training, project and research within the decentralized system. She is also an Assoc. Prof at the School of Women and Gender Studies, Makerere University.

== Background and education ==
Stonehill College, Mass., USA	BA (Hons), 1984	Liberal Arts
Univ. College Dublin	MA, 1985	Modern English & American Literature
Univ. College Dublin	H. Dip. Ed, 1986	Education
Univ. of Illinois at Urbana–Champaign M.S.	1994	Human Resources and Family Studies Gender Roles in International Development
Univ. of Illinois at Urbana–Champaign PhD	1998	Human & Community Development Gender Relations in International Dev't

== Career ==
=== Academic experience ===
In 1984, Consolata worked as a student teacher at Pearse Vocational College in Dublin, Ireland. She then became a part-time lecturer for Literary Criticism in the department of literature at Makerere University between 1989 and 1991.

In 1992, she worked as a research assistant at The Nation of Tomorrow Project, which was funded by Kellogg Foundation, University of Illinois at Urbana-Champaign shortened as UIUC for two years. She then continued as a teaching assistant under department of Human and Community Development, UIUC between 1991 and 1997.

In 1997, she became a graduate assistant for U of I Afro-American studies and research program, UIUC. She started lecturing at Makerere University in 1999 under the department of women and gender studies, later on in 2007, she was a research affiliate at Health Leisure and Human Performance Research Institute, Faculty of Kinesiology and Recreation Management, University of Manitoba, Canada.

In 2007, she also became a senior lecturer at the School of Women and Gender Studies, Makerere University to present.

2007– Present	Assoc. Prof, School of Women and Gender Studies, Makerere University
2007-2010	Research Affiliate, Health Leisure and Human Performance Research Institute, Faculty of Kinesiology and Recreation Management, Univ. of Manitoba, Canada.
1999–2007	Lecturer, Department of Women and Gender Studies, Makerere University.
1997-198	Graduate Assistant, U of I Afro-American Studies & Research Program, UIUC.
1991-1997	Teaching Assistant, Department of Human and Community Development, UIUC
1992-1993	Research Assistant, The Nation of Tomorrow Project funded by Kellogg Foundation, UIUC.
1989-1991	Lecturer, (part-time) Literary Criticism, Department of Literature, Makerere University.
1984	Student Teacher, Pearse Vocational College, Dublin, Ireland.

=== Administrative experience ===
2011-	Dean, School of Women and Gender Studies, Makerere University
2011-	President, National Association for Women Organizations of Uganda
2008 –2011	Head, Department of Women and Gender Studies Makerere University,
2008	Acting Head, Department of Women and Gender Studies Makerere University
2007-	Chairperson, Board of Directors, Kabarole Research & Resource Centre, Uganda
2005-2013	Vice Chairperson, Network of Ugandan Researchers & Research Users, Uganda
2003-2007	Vice Chairperson, Board of Directors, Kabarole Research & Resource Centre, Uganda
2002-2007	Chairperson, Sustainable Development Initiatives Uganda
2001- 2002	Acting Head, Department of Women and Gender Studies Makerere University
1992-1997	Administrative Assistant, Office of Women in International Development (WID, UIUC.)
1996-1997	Advisor, African and Africa-Related Women's Association, University of Illinois, UIUC.
1992-1994	President, African and Africa-Related Women's Association, University of Illinois, UIUC
1987-1991	Educational and Cultural Affairs Specialist, U.S. Information Service, American Embassy.

== Awards ==
Consolata won the Meritorious award and Cash Award, American Embassy, Uganda in 1988 and 1990 respectively. She again in 1993 won the John W. Price, International Understanding Award, UIUC and in 2005, she was nominated and won the Outstanding Lecturer award, at the Faculty of Social science, Makerere University.

She won The Role Model Diva Awards in 2011 and went straight to win two more in 2012 and 2013 respectively.

2011	The Role Model Diva Awards. Diva Awards Afrika 2012-2013
2005	Outstanding Lecturer Award, Faculty of Social Sciences, Makerere University
1993	John W. Price, International Understanding Award, UIUC
1988 and 1990	Meritorious Award and Cash Award, American Embassy, Uganda,

== Publications ==
- Awareness and attitudes towards anthrax and meat consumption practices among affected communities in Zambia: A mixed methods approach.
- Stillbirths in sub-Saharan Africa: unspoken grief.
- Gender analysis of agricultural extension policies in Uganda: informing practice?
- Gender symbolism and technology uptake: a literature review.
- Reflections on a collaborative experience: using ICT in a trans-cultural women's health module
