= Nancy A. Monteiro-Riviere =

American toxicologist

- Spouse: Jim E. Riviere (m. 1976)

Academic background
- Education: BSc, Biology, 1976, Stonehill College; MSc, 1979, PhD, 1981, Anatomy and Cell Biology, Purdue University

Academic work
- Institutions: Kansas State University; North Carolina State University

Nancy Ann Monteiro-Riviere is an American toxicologist. She is a Regents Distinguished Research Scholar and University Distinguished Professor at Kansas State University.

== Early life and education ==
Monteiro-Riviere completed her Bachelor of Science degree in biology at Stonehill College in 1976. Upon graduating, she was accepting at the University of Pennsylvania and Cornell University, but chose to attend Purdue University after they offered her a full scholarship. After graduating with her doctoral degree in 1981, Monteiro-Riviere became a post-doctoral fellow at the Chemical Industry Institute of Toxicology. During her fellowship, she studied the ultrastructural characterization of the nasal respiratory epithelium in rats. Based on this research, she co-authored Ultrastructural characterization of the nasal respiratory epithelium in the rat in the American Journal of Anatomy in 1984.

== Career ==
=== NCSU ===
Following her fellowship, Monteiro-Riviere became an assistant professor of anatomy and toxicology at North Carolina State University (NCSU). She originally focused on skin drug delivery and toxicity before shifting to nanotoxicology. In 1989, she collaborated with her husband and Karl F. Bowman to test nerve cells interact in humans and animals. They surgically removed small flaps of skin from young pigs and used them to test the effect of a range of chemicals. As she began to focus on nanotoxicology, Monteiro-Riviere received funding from the National Academies Keck Futures Initiative to study how nanomaterials cross membranes to allow for their interaction with cells. Through this grant, her research team found that repetitive movement could speed the uptake of nanoparticles through the skin. Following this, she found that quantum dot nanoparticles could also penetrate the skin if there was an abrasion. She reached this conclusion by testing this on rat skin at eight and 24 hour intervals. As a result of her overall research and academic success, Monteiro-Riviere was inducted into Purdue University's inaugural Distinguished Women Scholars.

=== KSU ===
In 2012, Monteiro-Riviere and her husband joined the faculty at the Kansas State University as the Regents Distinguished Research Scholar in the department of anatomy and physiology. They both retired in 2017.

== Personal life ==
Monteiro-Riviere married veterinary pharmacologist Jim E. Riviere in 1976 and they have three children together.
