= Mamaroneck, New York =

Mamaroneck
- Town
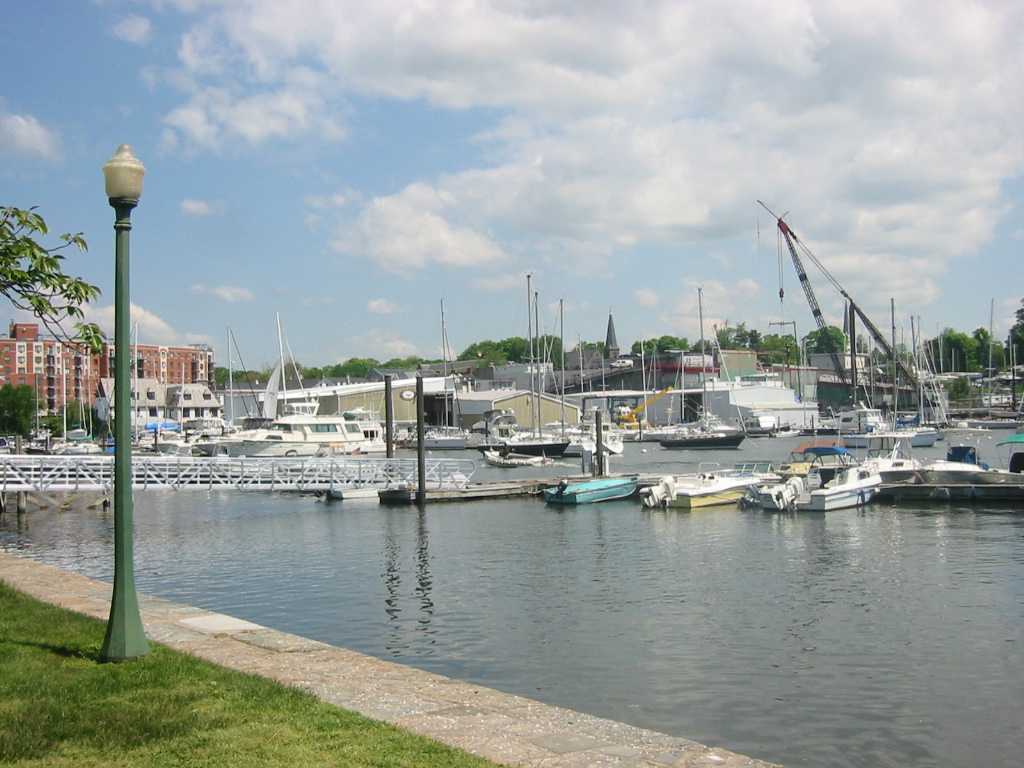
- Mamaroneck Harbor, May 2005

- Flag Seal

- Location of Mamaroneck, New York
- Coordinates: 40°56′57″N 73°44′01″W
- Country: United States
- State: New York
- County: Westchester

Government
  - Supervisor: Jaine Elkind Eney (D)

Area
  - Total: 14.07 sq mi (36.43 km^{2})
  - Land: 6.65 sq mi (17.23 km^{2})
  - Water: 7.41 sq mi (19.19 km^{2})
- Elevation: 0 ft (0 m)

Population (2020)
  - Total: 31,758
  - Density: 4,774/sq mi (1,843/km^{2})
- Time zone: UTC−5 (Eastern (EST))
  - Summer (DST): UTC−4 (EDT)
- ZIP Codes: 10538, 10543, 10583
- Area code: 914
- FIPS code: 36-119-44842
- Website: www.townofmamaroneckny.gov

Mamaroneck (/məˈmærənɛk/ mə-MARR-ə-nek) is a town in Westchester County, New York, United States.

The population was 31,758 at the 2020 United States census over 29,156 at the 2010 census. There are two villages contained within the town: Larchmont and the Village of Mamaroneck (part of which is located in the adjacent town of Rye). The majority of the town's land area is not within either village, constituting an unincorporated area, although a majority of the population lives within the villages. Legally, the unincorporated section and the villages constitute the town as a political and governmental subdivision of New York State. The town is led by a town board, composed of five town board members, which includes the town supervisor, Jaine Elkind Eney.

Much of the unincorporated section of the town receives its mail via the Larchmont Post Office and thereby has a Larchmont address.

== History ==
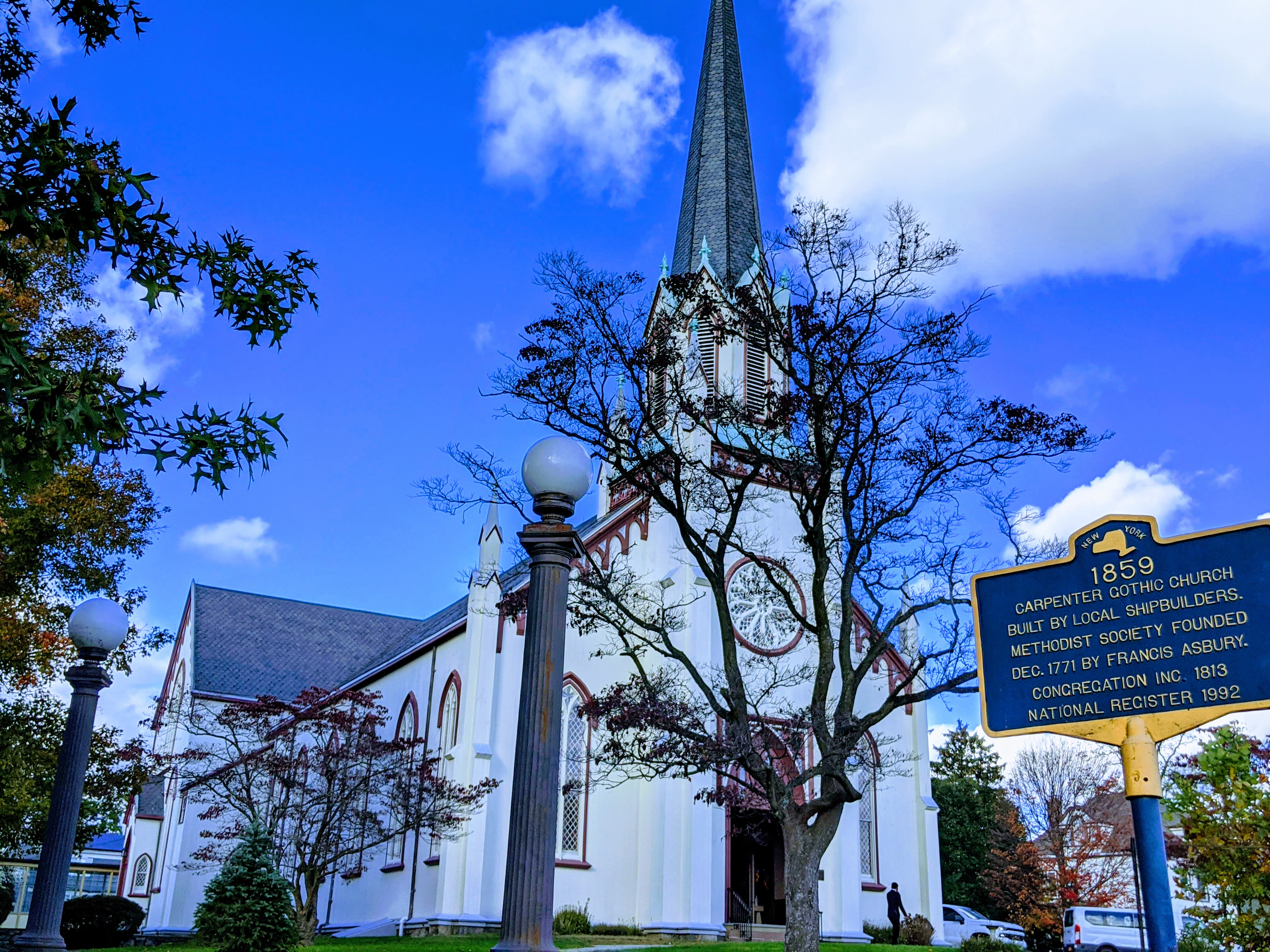
1859 Carpenter Gothic Church, also known as the Mamaroneck Methodist Church

The area that is now the town in Mamaroneck was purchased from the Siwanoy Wappaquewam on behalf of Manhatahan "another proprietors" and "by the consent of the other Indians," on September 23, 1661, by an Englishman named John Richbell who was a resident of Oyster Bay, Long Island.

During the American Revolutionary War, Loyalist William Lounsbery (also spelled Lounsberry and Lounsbury), who was recruiting soldiers for the British side, was attacked and killed by a group of Patriots in the Mamaroneck area on August 29, 1776. It was the first bloodshed of the war in Westchester County. Several other skirmishes between Loyalist and Patriot groups occurred in the area later that year, including the Battle of Mamaroneck, also known as the Skirmish of Heathcote Hill.

The New York Legislature created Mamaroneck as a town on March 7, 1788. The Town of Mamaroneck is divided into three parts: the Village of Larchmont, an unincorporated area, and the Village of Mamaroneck, the rest of that village being in the town of Rye.

This three-part division occurred in the 1890s to meet the growing demand for municipal services that the town could not provide. By definition at the time, a town could only provide basic government functions such as organizing and supervising elections, administering judicial functions, and constructing and maintaining highways.

During the 1890s, parts of the town of Mamaroneck that were situated closest to the water thrived. Larchmont Manor, with its beaches along Long Island Sound, had become well known as a summer resort for families from New York City, and people were beginning to live there year-round.

A large part of the town's population lived northeast of the Manor near Mamaroneck Harbor, the commercial center of town, where fishing, shipping, and manufacturing could be found. As the population of these two areas expanded, the residents soon found the need for adequate water supply, sewage disposal, garbage collection, sidewalks, and improved street lighting, police and fire protection.

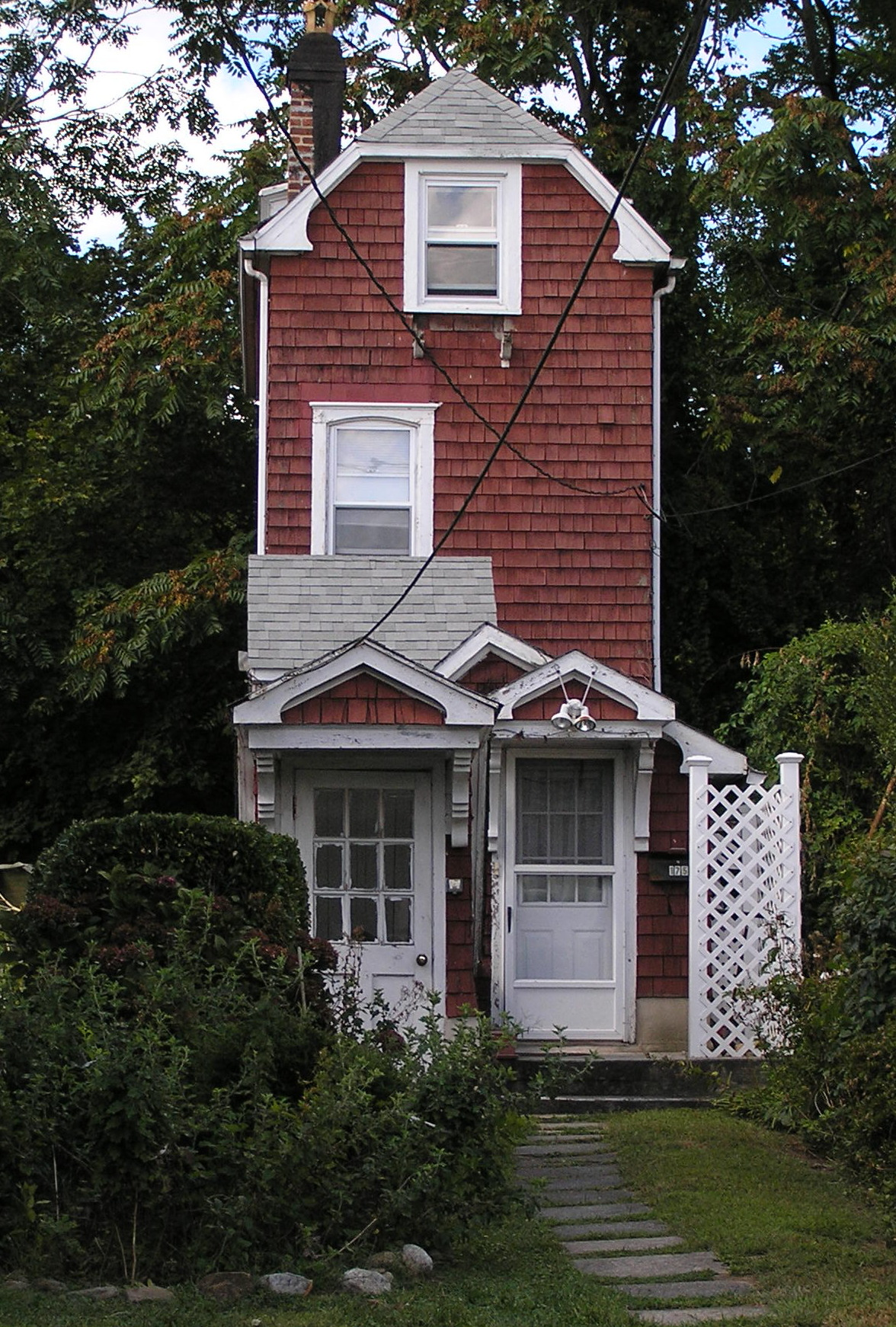
Mamaroneck Skinny House

In 1891, residents of Larchmont Manor obtained a charter from the Legislature under which they incorporated their section of town into a village. Four years later, residents of the most developed and populated sections of the towns of Mamaroneck and Rye voted to incorporate as the Village of Mamaroneck.

The Mamaroneck River serves as the boundary separating the towns of Mamaroneck and Rye. While residents of the two villages were now able to receive municipal services, not enough people resided in the unincorporated remainder of the town of Mamaroneck to be included in either village.

In the early 1920s, Mamaroneck was a center of movie‐making. According to The New York Times, "In those days the area was less the “East Coast Hollywood” than Hollywood was “the West Coast Mamaroneck.” The town boasted a distinction to which few communities could lay claim: a silent‐screen‐era movie studio." A former employee of D.W. Griffith's studio on Orienta, said "“In those days we'd get people like Mary Pickford, Douglas Fairbanks and Charlie Chaplin visiting. Even Mr. Rockefeller Sr., would come up from the city to see Mr. Griffith at the studio. I'm not fooling when I say Mamaroneck was more exciting than Hollywood back then.”

After World War I, the unincorporated section of the town grew sufficiently that the State Legislature granted the town government the local powers to provide local services it had previously granted to the villages by charter.

In 1921, the course at Winged Foot Golf Club was constructed and opened in June 1923. The golf club has been host to a number of professional tournaments, including the 1997 PGA Championship and the 1929, 1959, 1974, 1984, 2006, and 2020 U.S. Open.

The Town of Mamaroneck introduced New York's first vegetable-oil-powered garbage truck in 2008.

== Geography ==
According to the United States Census Bureau, the town has a total area of 14.0 square miles (36 km^{2}), of which 6.6 square miles (17 km^{2}) is land and 7.4 square miles (19 km^{2}), or 52.85%, is water. The unincorporated area of the town measures 5.17 square miles (13.4 km^{2}).

== Demographics ==
Historical population
Census	Pop.	Note	%±
1790	452		—
1820	878		—
1830	838		−4.6%
1840	1,416		69.0%
1850	928		−34.5%
1860	1,351		45.6%
1870	1,483		9.8%
1880	1,863		25.6%
1890	2,385		28.0%
1900	3,849		61.4%
1910	5,602		45.5%
1920	7,801		39.3%
1930	19,040		144.1%
1940	22,260		16.9%
1950	25,103		12.8%
1960	29,107		16.0%
1970	31,243		7.3%
1980	29,017		−7.1%
1990	27,706		−4.5%
2000	28,967		4.6%
2010	29,156		0.7%
2020	31,758		8.9%
U.S. Decennial Census

As of the 2000 United States census, there were 28,967 people, 10,929 households, and 7,748 families residing in the town. The population density was 4,377.5 inhabitants per square mile (1,690.2/km^{2}). There were 11,255 housing units at an average density of 1,700.8 units per square mile (656.7 units/km^{2}). The racial makeup of the town was 88.93% White, 2.80% Black or African American, 0.12% Native American, 3.12% Asian, 0.05% Pacific Islander, 2.91% from other races, and 2.06% from two or more races. Hispanic of any race were 10.92% of the population.

There were 10,929 households, out of which 35.6% had children under the age of 18 living with them, 60.0% were married couples living together, 8.0% had a female householder with no husband present, and 29.1% were non-families. 25.4% of all households were made up of individuals, and 10.5% had someone living alone who was 65 years of age or older. The average household size was 2.62 and the average family size was 3.15.

In the town, the population was spread out, with 26.1% under the age of 18, 5.1% from 18 to 24, 29.7% from 25 to 44, 24.3% from 45 to 64, and 14.8% who were 65 years of age or older. The median age was 39 years. For every 100 females, there were 91.3 males. For every 100 females aged 18 and over, there were 87.2 males.

The median income for a household in the town was $84,213, and the median income for a family was $118,774 (these figures had risen to $108,702 and $144,834 respectively as of a 2007 estimate). Males had a median income of $81,249 versus $42,703 for females. The per capita income for the town was $57,822. About 2.9% of families and 4.5% of the population were below the poverty line, including 3.7% of those under age 18 and 7.1% of those age 65 or over.

== Economy ==
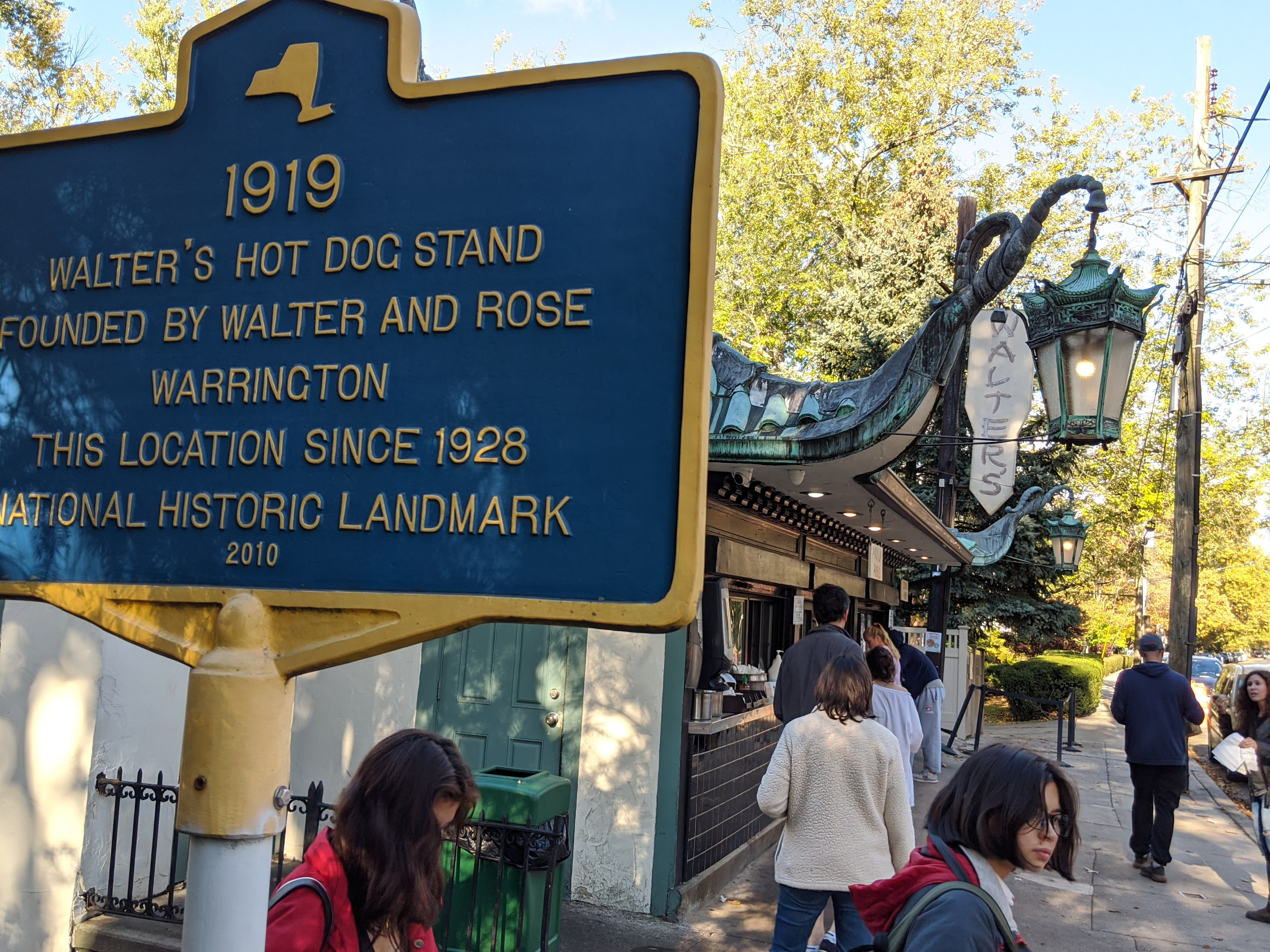
Walter's Hot Dog Pagoda. Walter's is a family business founded in 1919 by Walter Warrington in Mamaroneck, NY. The Palmer Avenue building has a pagoda-style copper roof, now oxidized to a light green, and dragon lanterns.

The Mamaroneck Winged Foot Golf Club has hosted numerous national amateur and professional golf championships since 1929, including the 2020 U.S. Open Championship held from September 17–20.

The publication division of Archie Comics is headquartered in Mamaroneck. The town is home to Walter's Hot Dog Stand, a Westchester County landmark. In 2010, Walter's was listed on the National Register of Historic Places.

== Education ==
Mamaroneck Union Free School District, which covers most of the town, operates public schools, including Mamaroneck High School and Hommocks Middle School.

A portion of the town to the north is in the Scarsdale School District.

Private schools:

- French-American School of New York
- Westchester Hebrew High School

== Notable people ==
- Edward Franklin Albee II, vaudeville impresario
- Edward Franklin Albee III, playwright, grew up in Larchmont
- Gerald B. Appel, celebrity physician, grew up in Mamaroneck
- James Bassett, journalist and author, In Harm's Way, grew up in Mamaroneck
- Richard K. Bernstein, physician noted for diabetes treatment
- Elizabeth Berridge, award-winning theater actress
- James Fenimore Cooper, novelist
- Coca Crystal, counterculture personality
- William H. DeLancey, Episcopal bishop and provost of the University of Pennsylvania
- Kevin Dillon, actor
- Matt Dillon, actor
- Morgan Farley, actor
- Jonathan Fielding, public health expert, philanthropist
- Henry Flagler, oil, hotels and railroad baron
- L. Fry (Leslie Fry) (pen name of Paquita de Shishmareff) (1882–1970), author and fascist activist
- Lou Gehrig, Hall of Fame baseball player, resided in a North Chatsworth Avenue apartment while playing for the Yankees
- Timothy Geithner, former United States Secretary of the Treasury
- D. W. Griffith, silent film director, lived in Mamaroneck for a few years in the 1920s
- Lina Khan, youngest chair of the Federal Trade Commission, attended high school in Mamaroneck
- William Kunstler, civil rights lawyer, lived at 210 West Street
- Steve Marker, musician, of the rock band Garbage
- Mary Mallon, Irish-American cook, aka Typhoid Mary (1900)
- Sal Mineo, actor
- Robert Ripley, of Ripley's Believe It or Not! had a home on BION (Believe It Or Not) Island, just off Taylor Lane in the Village of Mamaroneck
- Norman Rockwell, painter
- Amy Siskind, political activist
- Joel Simkhai, founder of social networking and gay dating apps Grindr, Blendr, and Motto
- Carly Rose Sonenclar, singer
- Gail Sheehy, writer and journalist
- Kennedy Steve, retired air traffic controller at JFK Airport
- Lee Stringer, author, longtime and resident
- Sandi Toksvig, writer, comedian and broadcaster, lived in Mamaroneck as a child
- Emily Wickersham, actress
- Robert E. Will, Theater professor at University of Rhode Island
- Gary Young, first drummer of the alternative rock band Pavement
