= Susan G. Komen =

American non-profit organization

- Formation: 1982; 44 years ago
- Founder: Nancy Goodman Brinker (sister of Susan G. Komen)
- Founded at: Dallas, Texas
- Type: Nonprofit organization
- Legal status: 501(c)(3)
- Headquarters: Dallas, Texas; United States
- Key people: Amber Guild (CEO)
- Revenue: $103,154,379 (2025)
- Expenses: $110,497,282 (2025)
- Endowment: $8,118,044
- Employees: 492 (2024)
- Website: komen.org

Susan G. Komen (formerly known as Susan G. Komen for the Cure; originally as The Susan G. Komen Breast Cancer Foundation; often referred to simply as Komen) is a breast cancer organization in the United States.

Komen conducts activities in research funding, patient navigation, advocacy, and patient care services related to breast cancer. The organization has funded research into the causes and treatment of breast cancer.

== History ==
The foundation's namesake, Susan Goodman Komen, died of breast cancer in 1980 at age 36. Her younger sister Nancy Brinker, who has stated that she believed Susan's outcome might have been better had she known more about cancer and its treatment, founded the Susan G. Komen Breast Cancer Foundation in 1982.

In 1998, the U.S. Postal Service issued the first Breast Cancer Awareness Stamp, in conjunction with Komen. As of 2026, purchases of this stamp have raised over $95 million for Breast Cancer Research by the National Institutes of Health and the Medical Research Program of the Department of Defense.

In 2007, the 25th anniversary of the organization, they changed the name to "Susan G. Komen for the Cure" and its logo to the pink ribbon. The logo represents Komen's signature Race for the Cure event, a jogging race that raises money for the foundation. The foundation gave a pink ribbon to every participant in its 1991 Race for the Cure event held in New York City, establishing the pink ribbon as a national symbol for breast cancer awareness.

In December 2009, Nancy Brinker was appointed CEO of the organization. Judith A. Salerno became CEO in 2013. In November 2016, the organization announced that Salerno would step down as CEO the following month. In 2017, Paula Schneider, breast cancer survivor and business executive who led the turnaround of American Apparel as its CEO and held several leadership roles in global brands, became the CEO.

After seven years of leadership, Schneider stepped down in August 2025.

On October 1, 2026, Amber Guild became the new CEO of Susan G. Komen. A breast cancer survivor, Guild joined the organization after three-and-a-half years as CEO of McCann New York.

According to Susan G. Komen, its mission is to reduce breast cancer mortality through community-based programs and research funding. It has identified priorities that include expanding access to care and supporting research on aggressive forms of breast cancer.

Susan G. Komen funding contributed to the development of all 19 drugs approved by the FDA between 2012 and 2023 to treat breast cancer. Over the past 30 years, Susan G. Komen-backed research has contributed to the development of more than 30 FDA-approved drugs designed for breast cancer treatment.

In 2020, Susan G. Komen had 60 independently governed chapters that it consolidated into a single, unified entity headquartered in Dallas, Texas.

== Activities ==
=== Use of funds ===
Komen's Fiscal Year 2025 Spending
1. Program Services (72.2%)
2. Fundraising (18.9%)
3. Management & General (8.90%)

In the fiscal year 2025, Susan G. Komen reported total expenses of nearly $142 million, with 72% (more than $102.4 million) allocated to program services, which include research, patient care, and advocacy. Fundraising accounted for 19% (nearly $27 million) of expenses, while management and general administrative costs were 9% (more than $12.6 million). During the year, the organization reported investing more than $18 million in breast cancer research, including grants focused on metastatic and aggressive forms of the disease.

=== Grants and awards ===
Komen provides funding for basic, clinical, and translational breast cancer research and in breast health education. The organization has invested nearly $1.1 billion in over 2800 research grants. By 2008, Komen had awarded over $100 million in research grants.

Since 1992, Komen has also annually awarded work in the field of cancer research with the Komen Brinker Award for Scientific Distinction.

In 2012, a Reuters analysis found that while Komen’s research grants had grown in absolute terms, they accounted for a smaller share of its increasing donations In 2011, the foundation spent $63 million (15%) of its donations on research grants and awards.

In June 2026, Susan G. Komen announced it had awarded $15.4 million in grants to support breast cancer research. The funding was distributed among 35 researchers connected with 24 U.S. medical and research institutions. Seventy-two percent of the funding went to metastatic breast cancer research, and 88% supported precision medicine initiatives aimed at customizing treatments based on individual patient biology.

=== Global activities ===
Since 1982, the organization has reported awarding more than 200 grants to around 170 international research recipients, totaling over $59 million. As of 2024, Komen maintains international affiliates in Italy and Puerto Rico.

The organization also participates in several international cancer-related collaborations and provides breast cancer educational tools and materials translated into multiple languages.

In addition to research funding, Komen has reported supporting breast cancer education and capacity-building programs in multiple countries.

=== Advocacy ===
The Susan G. Komen Center for Public Policy, launched in 2019, aims to mobilize advocates and policymakers for a common cause. The organization supports state and federal policies aimed at accelerating breast cancer research, along with expanding insurance coverage for diagnostics and treatment.

In February 2026, healthcare professionals attended a workshop led by Susan G. Komen to address racial disparities in breast cancer outcomes. Held in Norfolk, Virginia, the workshop was part of a multi-year effort to reduce mortality rates among Black women in the surrounding areas, where statistics show that Black women are 60% more likely to die from breast cancer than white women.

== Fundraising ==
=== Events ===
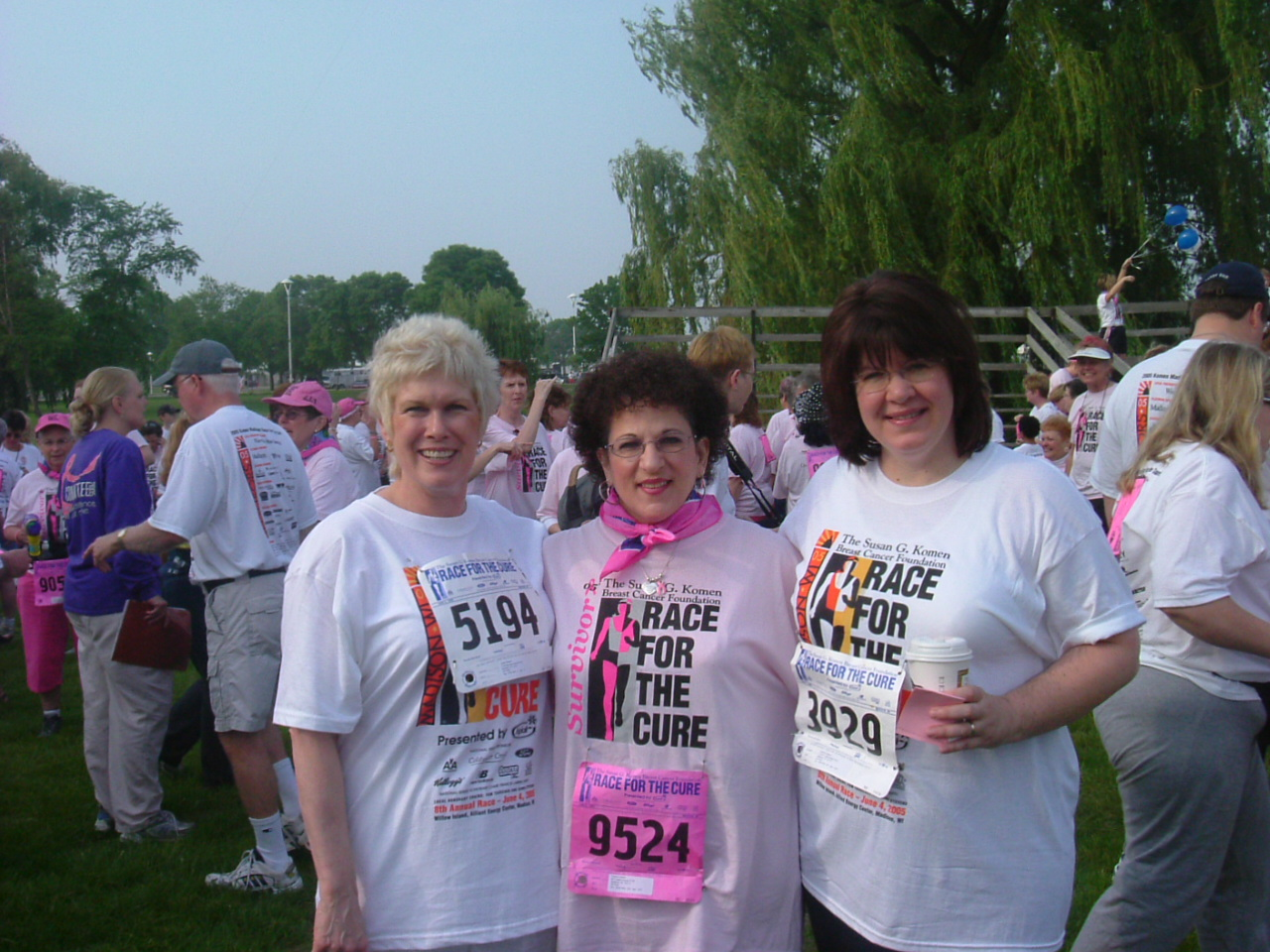
A group participating in a Komen Race for the Cure event

The Susan G. Komen Race for the Cure consists of a series of 5K runs and fitness walks to raise money and awareness for breast cancer.

The first race was run in Dallas, Texas in 1983, with 800 participants. By 2004, when President George W. Bush held a National Race for the Cure Reception at the White House, the Race for the Cure was held in over 100 locations nationwide and was the largest 5K run/fitness walk in the world, with more than a million participants. The first Race for the Cure event outside of the United States took place in Costa Rica in 1998. By 2016, the event had expanded to include more than 150 races held across four continents.

The race's primary source of revenue is donations collected by the participants. In 2011, Komen said that three-quarters of the event's proceeds were being used locally to pay for community outreach programs, breast health education, and breast cancer screening and treatment projects run by the Komen affiliate, with the remaining quarter sent to the central organization.

Komen's other nationwide events have included:

- Susan G. Komen 3-Day for the Cure, a 60-mile (97 km) fundraiser walk
- Susan G. Komen Marathon for the Cure – fundraiser half and full marathon
- Susan G. Komen Bowl for the Cure – fund-raising and awareness initiative founded in 2000 and sponsored by USBC and The Bowling Foundation.

== Controversy and criticism ==
In 2010, Komen was rated one of the most trusted nonprofit organizations in America. After the organization faced some controversies between 2011 and 2017, some of its local affiliates merged or dissolved, and it experienced a decline in revenue. However, the foundation had a year-over-year increase in revenue from fiscal year March 2024 to March 2025, March 2021 to March 2022, and March 2020 to March 2021. Komen's ranking on Charity Navigator, which was four stars (the highest rating) in 2013, dropped to two stars in 2014. As of 2021, it ranked three stars, with a score of 82 out of 100. In 2026, it ranked 4 stars with a 93% rating.

=== Pinkwashing ===
Komen has faced controversies for alleged "pinkwashing". The term refers to marketing practices where organizations use breast cancer awareness campaigns while potentially contributing minimally to the cause or promoting products with adverse health impacts.

The organization stated that such collaborations provide outreach, particularly to underserved communities. In the 2010 'Buckets for the Cure' campaign with KFC, Komen highlighted that health messaging and alternative menu options were offered, and participation was voluntary.

In 2019, Komen created 'Live Pink' (now called Shop for the Cure), an online shopping platform for products that benefit breast cancer research and patient services.

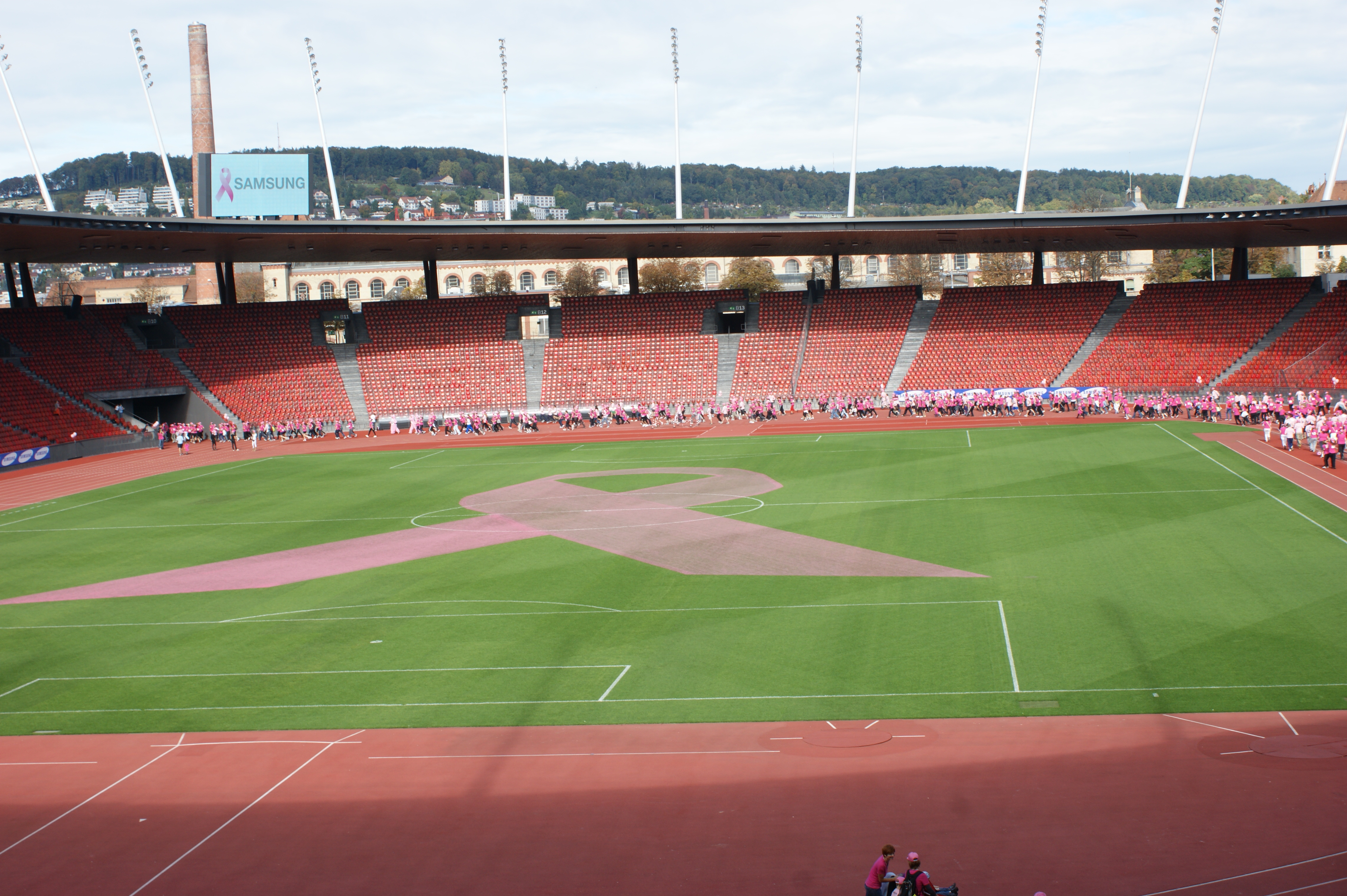
Ribbon Branded Stadium

==== Donation criticisms ====
Some Komen campaigns have required that consumers mail proof of purchase for a promoted item before the manufacturer donates, and some campaigns have placed a cap on the maximum amount donated. In 2002, credit card operator American Express launched the "Charge for a Cure" campaign with the motto that "in the search for a cure, every dollar counts." The amount donated per qualifying transaction, regardless of the purchase amount, was one cent.

==== Health criticisms ====
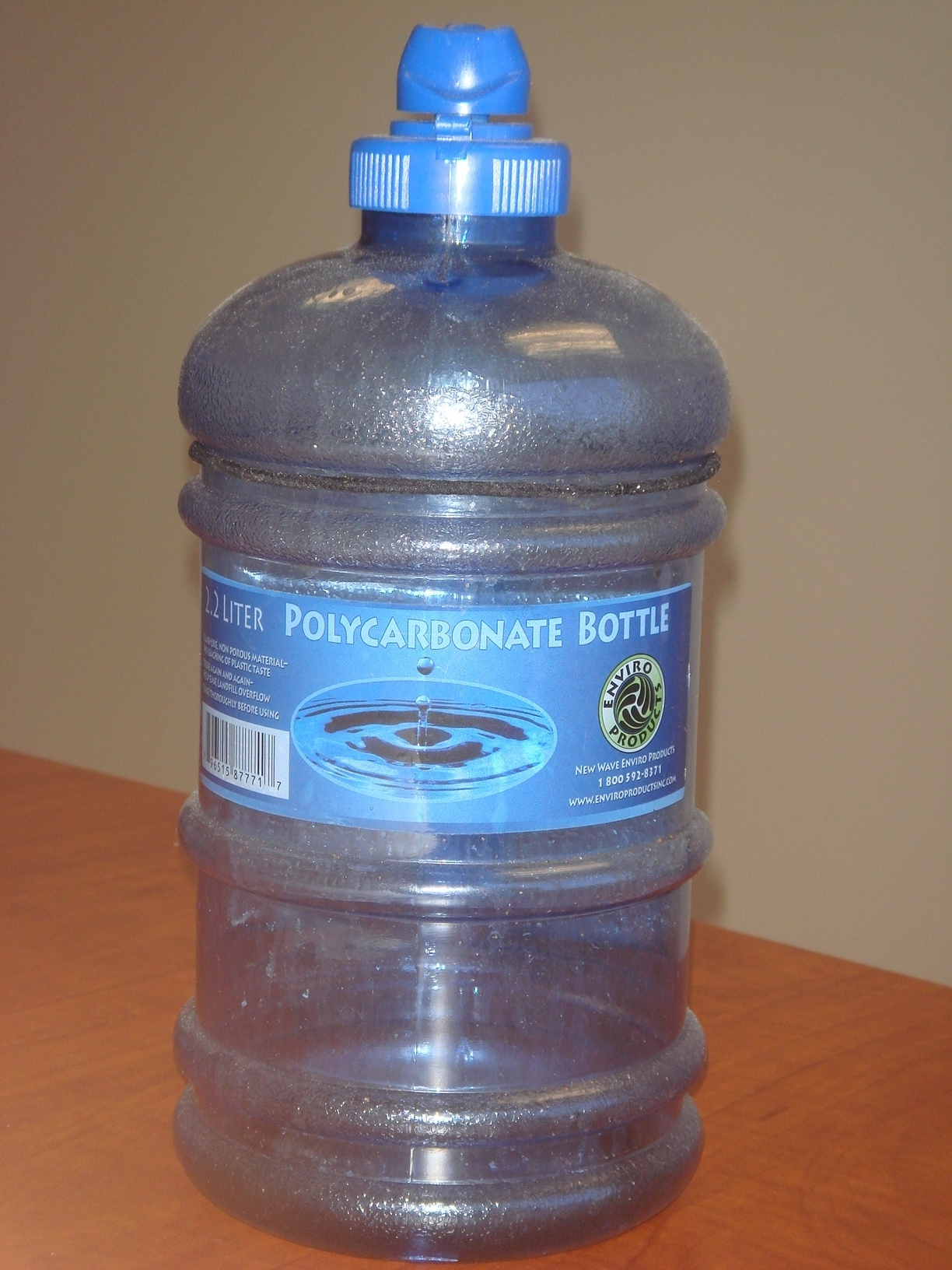
Bisphenol A is primarily used to make plastics, such as this polycarbonate water bottle.

Komen has partnered with various companies, including water bottle retailers, Ford, KFC, and Baker Hughes, for fundraising and awareness campaigns. Some products and partnerships, such as pink water bottles, Mustang editions, KFC promotions, perfumes, and pink drill bits, have raised questions about potential health impacts, though Komen has noted outreach and fundraising benefits.

=== Legal battles over trademarking ===
In 2007, the organization changed its name to Susan G. Komen for the Cure and trademarked the running ribbon as part of its branding strategy.

Komen has faced some criticism for legal action against other organizations using the phrase "for the cure" in their names. An August 2010 Wall Street Journal article detailed a case in which Komen told the organization Uniting Against Lung Cancer no longer to use the name "Kites for the Cure" for its annual fund-raising event. Komen also wrote to the organization to warn it "against any use of pink in conjunction with 'cure.'" More than 100 small charities have received legal opposition from Komen after using "for the cure" in their names. Among the offending organizations and events were "Par for the Cure," "Surfing for a Cure," "Cupcakes for a Cure," and "Mush for the Cure".

Komen says that the organization protects its trademarks as a matter of financial stewardship to prevent confusion among donors.

Komen stated that enforcement is necessary to prevent brand dilution and donor confusion. The organization holds over 130 registered trademarks and generally seeks out-of-court resolutions through cease-and-desist letters and coexistence agreements.

=== Relationship with Planned Parenthood ===
Komen funded breast health programs for underserved women through third-party organizations, including some services at Planned Parenthood.

Beginning in 2007, Komen granted money to pay for 170,000 clinical breast exams and 6,400 mammogram referrals through the Planned Parenthood Federation of America and affiliates. Komen had said its affiliates provide funds for breast cancer screening, education, and treatment programs in dozens of communities where Planned Parenthood is the only place poor, uninsured or under-insured women can receive these services. Planned Parenthood clinics do not perform mammograms, instead making referrals for their patients to sites that do them.

On January 31, 2012, Komen stopped funding exams provided by Planned Parenthood, citing a congressional investigation by Representative Cliff Stearns and a newly created internal rule about not funding organizations under federal, state, or local investigation. While conservative religious and anti-abortion groups applauded the move, it was denounced by several editorials, women's health advocacy groups, and politicians.

In the 24 hours after the news broke, Planned Parenthood received more than $400,000 from 6,000 donors, followed by pledges of a $250,000 matching grant from New York City Mayor Michael Bloomberg and a $250,000 gift from a foundation run by the CEO of Bonanza Oil Co. in Dallas to replace the lost funding.

Four days later, Komen's board of directors reversed the decision and announced that it would amend the policy to "make clear that disqualifying investigations must be criminal and conclusive in nature and not political.". Several top-level staff members resigned from Komen during the controversy. In August 2012, Brinker announced she would leave her CEO role.

Karen Handel, the Brinker protégée whose opposition to abortion was at the center of the Planned Parenthood controversy, stepped down in February 2012 from her role as the foundation’s senior vice president for policy.

=== Embryonic stem cell research ===
In 2006, Komen wrote in its newsletter that embryonic stem cell research had promise for curing breast cancer. In 2011, the anti-abortion Coalition on Abortion/Breast Cancer said that Komen gave $12 million to institutions such as Johns Hopkins School of Medicine and the U.S. National Cancer Institute that funded stem cell research. According to Science magazine, Christopher Umbricht got nearly $600,000 from Komen for molecular marker research at Johns Hopkins that includes stem cells.

Komen clarified that it did not directly fund derivation or projects specifically focused on ESCR. Facing pressure from religious groups, particularly some Catholic dioceses, Komen reiterated that its funds would not support embryonic stem cell work.

=== CEO salary ===
According to Komen's 2011–12 IRS Form 990 declarations, Brinker made $684,717 that fiscal year, a 64% raise. Komen said the last CEO salary hike had taken place in November 2010.

After the release of this information, Judith A. Salerno was named CEO, with Brinker named Founder and Chair of Global Strategy.

Salerno’s salary was reduced, Brinker left by 2015, and Komen maintained favorable Charity Navigator ratings, returning to four stars by 2023. As of June 2026, the organization maintained a four-star rating.

== See also ==
- List of health-related charity fundraisers
