= DeSisto School =

Defunct therapeutic boarding schools in Massachusett, United States

Coordinates: 42°19′47″N 73°19′57″W

The DeSisto Schools were a pair of therapeutic boarding schools founded by Michael DeSisto, DeSisto at Stockbridge School in Massachusetts (from 1978 to 2004) and the DeSisto at Howey School in Florida (1980 to 1988). It closed in 2004 amid allegations by state authorities that the school endangered the health and safety of its students.

Stockbridge Campus c. 1982

== History ==
=== Beginnings ===
Michael DeSisto, after being dismissed as director of the Lake Grove School on Long Island, New York, raised $180,000 in advance tuition fees and donations from the parents of students who supported his vision, and encouraged him to open a new school "where he could put his philosophy into practice". In 1978, Mike DeSisto was able to get approximately one-third of all the Lake Grove student body, and faculty to leave with him after he was fired by Lake Grove's management. These original staff and students served as the nucleus of the new DeSisto at Stockbridge School. The school was then established on the 300-acre (1.2 km^{2}) former campus of the old defunct Stockbridge School (a.k.a. The Hanna Estate and Bonnie Brier Farm), in the Berkshires region of Massachusetts, near Tanglewood Music Center, and the Stockbridge Bowl. The DeSisto school's program placed heavy emphasis on discipline, structure, and psychological therapy.

On April 14, 1980, DeSisto opened a second campus in Howey-in-the-Hills Florida named the DeSisto at Howey School. DeSisto originally envisioned a string of schools nationally and internationally based on the principles of Gestalt psychology, and his own therapeutic model. DeSisto stated that the Stockbridge campus would be his "flagship". The DeSisto School would develop a reputation as the place that the wealthy could send their children. However, about 20% of the students were not from wealthy families and received funding from their local school districts as students in special education, or their parents/guardians endured financial hardship to send their children to the school.

In the late 1970s, and the early 1980s, DeSisto and the DeSisto School were favorably featured in articles in Life, Time, and People magazines. DeSisto made a number of appearances on national television with his students, including The Today Show. The DeSisto School was often mentioned on Joey Reynolds's radio show. Michael DeSisto was a regular guest. Reynolds was also a fundraiser for the school, and had one of his children enrolled there.

In 1987 DeSisto opened a college on the Howey campus, named DeSisto College. The experiment was short-lived though when the local government objected. The DeSisto School, and some of its students, sued and appealed in federal court unsuccessfully for the college to continue its operations.

The annual tuition for the DeSisto School in 1978 was $10,000 for room and board excluding costs of therapy and other miscellaneous fees, and expenses. The DeSisto School was a 365-day-a-year program. Some students were offered trips during the summer months both domestically and to Europe, as well as an academic summer school, a performing arts program, or manual work program on campus. At its peak in the late 1980s, the DeSisto School had a combined enrollment of approximately 300 students on the Stockbridge and Howey campuses. By 2004 tuition had ballooned to $71,000, and enrollment had dropped to below 30 students before the school's closure.

=== Controversies ===
Quite early on, the school had problems with the Massachusetts Commonwealth Department of Education which withdrew its accreditation after questions arose about the school's treatment of "special needs" students. The school sued in 1983 and won back its accreditation.

In 1986, the DeSisto School received national media attention with the case of Heather Burdick from Old Bridge, New Jersey. Burdick, a student at the Stockbridge campus, told disturbing stories about the school to people from her hometown. A group of parents from Old Bridge tied yellow ribbons around trees and started a "Free Heather" movement. They sought to sue the DeSisto School for illegally detaining Burdick, but the action failed. Burdick's parents then sued their neighbors for invasion of privacy, libel, and slander. The DeSisto School subsequently successfully counter sued the Old Bridge parents group. After recovering $550,000 in legal expenses, the school was awarded $41,000 for damages. The Old Bridge parents group then attempted to sue Burdick for misrepresenting her circumstances. In 1990 Burdick's parents won their counter suit and were awarded $259,000 in damages for emotional distress and invasion of privacy.

On November 15, 1988, The Boston Globe reported that Michael DeSisto, and the DeSisto School had been sued 23 times for breach of contract and fraud. The same Globe article also reported that Michael DeSisto denied falsifying records of the Howey campus' graduation rates.

In 1988 the Orlando Sentinel reported that the DeSisto School's claim of accreditation by the National Association of Independent Schools was false. Michael DeSisto responded that "low-level staff members were responsible". Mike DeSisto's résumé also stated he had been a faculty member at Elmira College, in Elmira, New York, and at Adelphi University, in Garden City, New York, when he had never had been a faculty member at either institution. DeSisto also claimed he had worked as a consultant for the Free University of New York at Stony Brook. According to Jeremy Weis, an official with the New York Bureau of Academic Information and Reports, the state agency with which all universities must register, "I've never heard of this university". Elmira payroll supervisor Mary Fetyko said, "DeSisto never worked there." At Adelphi, administrator Margaret Elaine Wittman said, "there are no records of DeSisto having been a faculty member, the man is completely foreign to us, the fact that he would say this on his vita is incredible."

On November 15, 1988, the Orlando Sentinel ran an article, titled "Reports Raise Questions About Desisto [sic] Drug Policy". The article charges that "critics say drugs have been handed out in an almost capricious manner". The school responded that, "that all drugs used are prescribed and carefully monitored and that no problems have surfaced". Nevertheless, as early as, March 1981 the Massachusetts Office for Children cited school staff members in Stockbridge for permitting untrained dormitory parents to distribute prescription drugs.

In November 1988, the Orlando Sentinel ran an unflattering three-part exposé on DeSisto. In response to complaints made by Michael DeSisto that the articles "presented an unfair picture of him and his schools", on October 7, 1990, the Orlando Sentinel published a follow-up article titled "New Information On The Desisto [sic] Schools". It is the Sentinel's policy to review all such complaints "in a spirit of fairness". The Sentinel found that "the presentation of one story in the three-day series may have led to the unintentionally misleading conclusion that his entire career was built on false credentials."

During the late 1980s, a group of students under the aegis of the DeSisto School sued Howey-in-the-Hills over zoning issues related to the incipient DeSisto College. The town of Howey-in-the-Hills was awarded $203,279.27 in attorney fees and $17,194.12 in costs. The case of DeSisto College, Inc. v. Town of Howey-in-the-Hills, 718 F.Supp. 906 (M.D.Fla. 1989), and its appeals, are often cited and used as precedent where the plaintiff's claim is frivolous because it has no basis in law, the plaintiff rejects any reasonable offer to settle, the trial court dismisses the case without trial, and the plaintiff does not offer any novel legal theories. In 1993, after years of pursuing the defunct DeSisto at Howey School, the town council of Howey-in-the-Hills agreed to accept a cash and property settlement worth about $80,000, much less than the total judgment amount of approximately $250,000.

In 1989 the United States Department of Labor brought a $1 million lawsuit against the school on behalf of former staff members demanding back wages and damages.

In 1991, DeSisto authored his only book: Decoding Your Teenager: How to Understand Each Other During the Turbulent Years. After its publication, some journalists published articles questioning whether DeSisto held a master's degree in psychology from the University of Massachusetts, as he claimed. DeSisto later admitted to not possessing the master's degree, and said the error was due to a "low-level assistant", who had mistakenly placed it on his résumé.

In 1993 Alfonso Saiz a DeSisto dorm parent was sentenced to four to five years in state prison for sexually molesting six DeSisto students. A 1996 DSS investigation found three cases of abuse and neglect of nine students.

On January 29, 1999, two workers at the DeSisto at Stockbridge school were arraigned in Berkshire Superior Court on a single count each for abuse or neglect of a disabled patient taking the drug lithium, resulting in the student's hospitalization. Investigation resulted in the charges being dropped for these two staff members, and the blame affixed to higher ranking staff and licensed medical personnel.

In 1999, DeSisto produced an off-off-Broadway musical titled Inappropriate with Lonnie McNeil and Michael Sottile based on the journals and life experiences of the student performers. The show also had a run in Los Angeles in the year 2000 with an eye on turning it into a film. This, however, did not pan out.

The Cult Awareness Network placed the DeSisto School on its list of cults it kept records on.

Author Roger Kahn claimed in his memoir Into My Own (2006) (p. 261) that the school's tough love policy, "led to at least one fatality, when a boy put off campus mid-winter, froze to death on an icy Berkshire Hill". Mr. Kahn's son committed suicide in 1987 shortly after leaving school without graduating.

Pinal County, Arizona Sheriff and 2012 Republican Congressional candidate Paul Babeu is embroiled in controversy concerning events that occurred at the DeSisto School while he was its executive director and headmaster from 1999 to 2001.

=== Demise ===
Following a long legal fight with the Commonwealth of Massachusetts over licensing and allegations of child abuse, a Commonwealth-imposed enrollment freeze, and accusations of failing to create a safe environment for its students, the DeSisto at Stockbridge School chose to voluntarily close in June 2004.

A month previously, officials from the state Office of Child Care Services ordered DeSisto administrators to suspend their admissions process. In a letter, Commonwealth officials charged the school had "an environment that endangers the life, health, and safety of children enrolled".

Frank McNear, DeSisto's executive director, told The Boston Globe at the time, that the school could not run properly without its customary admissions process. "They did us grave financial damage when they closed our admissions", McNear said. "We can no longer fight this. They've been saying they want to close us, and they succeeded."

The DeSisto at Stockbridge School was renamed the Cold Spring Academy, and opened a campus in Sarasota, Florida. The Cold Spring Academy permanently closed in 2005.

== See also ==
- Therapeutic boarding school
- Attack therapy
- Large-group awareness training
- Gestalt therapy
- Human Potential Movement
- Group psychological abuse
- Family therapy
- Fritz Perls
- Groupthink
- Residential treatment center
- Milieu therapy
