= Blendr =

Geosocial networking application

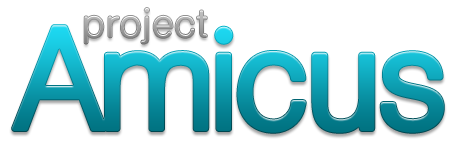
- Developer: Blendr LLC
- Release: September 8, 2011

Final release(s)
- Android: 5.111.4 / April 2, 2019; 7 years ago
- iOS: 5.6.0 / May 12, 2017; 9 years ago
- Operating system: iOS, Android
- Size: Android: 28.21 MB iOS: 166MB
- Type: Online Dating
- Website: blendr.com

Blendr was an online dating application based on geosocial networking for Android, iOS and Facebook. It was designed to connect like-minded people near to each other. It was created by Joel Simkhai and patterned after his previous app Grindr (an app aimed at gay men). Blendr claimed to be "powered by" Badoo but largely appeared to be the same service. As of 2022, it had 200 million users worldwide and required users to be over the age of 18.

On 31 October 2022, Blendr ceased activity in all territories worldwide. A statement on the Blendr website stated that all user data would be deleted by 30 November 2022 and the website would go offline from 7 December 2022.

== Description ==
The application combined GPS location sensing with a social networking framework, to provide users with the opportunity to meet people who were near to each other. The application could also be used to communicate with people in real time about a location, such as getting information about the current status of a local restaurant, or for determining whether a club currently held people that the user might want to meet. Users needed to be over the age of 18.

Users provided a photograph and basic information about their interests (though they were not required to give out their actual name or other personal details), and then were able to browse other people who were nearby to their present location. In order to protect the privacy of its users, the application only provided a rough estimate of the user's location, and also allowed users to limit themselves to contact with people who met their self-defined criteria. Simkhai had specifically designed Blendr to be less focused on casual sexual encounters than Grindr is, intending it to be a tool for meeting new people who share common interests from business to hobbies and relationships of all types. The company had strict rules forbidding the use of nudity, pictures or written descriptions of sexual acts, as well as racist statements or other hate speech.

== Platforms ==
Blendr was available through the website, or for iOS devices through the iTunes app store and for Android through Google Play. As of September 2012, the application was free and supported by advertising, with a subscription option for increased functionality.

== History ==
Blendr was announced to the press at SXSW on March 14, 2011, under the code name Project Amicus. The name "Blendr" was ultimately revealed when the app launched in the iTunes app store on September 8, 2011.

Blendr released a statement that the service would cease activity in all territories worldwide on 31 October 2022, and all user data would be deleted by 30 November 2022.

== See also ==
- Comparison of online dating services
- Timeline of online dating services
