= Michael DeSisto =

American educator (1939–2003)

Michael DeSisto (born Albert Michael DeSisto)
- DeSisto in school gown at 1983 graduation
- Born: May 29, 1939; Boston, Massachusetts
- Died: November 1, 2003 (aged 64); Boston, Massachusetts
- Education: Stonehill College B.A.
- Occupation: Executive Director of the DeSisto Schools
- Spouse: Majorie Charles Bullock
- Relatives: Joseph (Joey) DeSisto

A. (Albert) Michael DeSisto (May 29, 1939 – November 1, 2003) was an American educator best known for founding and directing the DeSisto Schools.

== Early life and education ==
Born in Boston, Massachusetts on May 29, 1939, Michael DeSisto attended parochial schools in West Roxbury, and graduated from Cathedral High School in Boston in 1957. DeSisto made average marks in elementary and secondary school. At one time being expelled from Cardinal O'Connell, a Boston seminary school. He was a theology student at St. John's Seminary in Brighton for two years. He received a Bachelor of Arts degree in political science from Stonehill College in North Easton in 1962.

== Career ==
DeSisto was a teacher, unlicensed therapist, and director for eleven years at The Lake Grove School on Long Island, New York. DeSisto disagreed with administrators of Lake Grove regarding their educational approach and was fired. In 1978 he secured funding mostly in the form of advance tuition payments, and direct donations, from the parents of former students of The Lake Grove School, and founded school. He founded the DeSisto at Stockbridge School in Stockbridge, Massachusetts for at risk teens in 1978.

DeSisto stated that the Stockbridge campus would be his "flagship". In 1980 DeSisto opened a second campus in Howey-in-the-Hills, Florida.

In the early 1980s, DeSisto and the DeSisto School were featured in articles in Life, Time and People magazines. DeSisto made a number of appearances on national television with his students, including The Today Show. He appeared several times as a guest on the Joey Reynolds radio show.

The DeSisto at Howey School closed in 1988. DeSisto stated that the reason was declining enrollment, and legal problems with the local government. The DeSisto at Stockbridge School closed permanently in June 2004, amid commonwealth allegations that it did not create a safe environment for its students.

In 1988 The Orlando Sentinel reported that the DeSisto School's claim of accreditation by the National Association of Independent Schools was false. Michael DeSisto responded that, "low-level staff members were responsible". Mike DeSisto's résumé also stated he had been a faculty member at Elmira College and Adelphi University, when he had not ever been a faculty member at either institution. DeSisto also claimed he had worked as a consultant for the Free University of New York at Stony Brook. According to Jeremy Weis, an official with the New York Bureau of Academic Information and Reports, the state agency with which all universities must register "I've never heard of this university". Elmira payroll supervisor Mary Fetyko said, "DeSisto never worked there." At Adelphi, administrator Margaret Elaine Wittman said, "there are no records of DeSisto having been a faculty member, the man is completely foreign to us, the fact that he would say this on his vita is incredible."

In November 1988, The Orlando Sentinel ran a three-part exposé about Michael DeSisto, titled Desisto(sic) Went Far On Fake Credentials, "Who is Michael DeSisto? For years, Howey's most controversial resident has claimed a lot of impressive academic and professional credentials, many of which are false. The real story is one of firings from teaching posts and inflated representations of his professional stature.Yet those credentials are a significant aspect of the almost overwhelmingly positive publicity he has received—on the Today show, in Life, Time and People magazines, and in numerous newspaper articles—and the subsequent financial success he has achieved with his private preparatory schools." In response to complaints made by Michael DeSisto that the articles "presented an unfair picture of him and his schools". On October 7, 1990, the Orlando Sentinel published a follow-up article titled, New Information On The Desisto(sic) Schools. It is the Sentinel's policy to review all such complaints "in a spirit of fairness". The Sentinel found that, "the presentation of one story in the three-day series may have led to the unintentionally misleading conclusion that his entire career was built on false credentials."

In 1991, DeSisto authored his only book: Decoding Your Teenager (How to understand each other during the turbulent years) After its publication, some journalists published articles calling into question whether DeSisto actually held a master's degree in psychology from the University of Massachusetts, as he claimed, or did not. In fact the University of Massachusetts doesn't even offer a master's degree in psychology, and only has a doctorate program. DeSisto later admitted to not possessing the Master's degree, and said the error was due to a "low-level assistant", who had mistakenly placed it on his résumé.

It 1991 Michael DeSisto was selected to receive the Outstanding Alumnus Award from his alma mater, Stonehill College. The reasons given were,"in recognition of his dedication to helping troubled youth and their families. He was an outstanding educator, a compassionate counselor, a popular author, a skilled communicator and founder of the DeSisto School, a therapeutic-educational community for troubled teenagers."

In 1999, DeSisto produced an off-off-Broadway musical Inappropriate with Lonnie McNeil and Michael Sottile based on the journals and life experiences of the student performers. On December 6, 2004 the composer of "Inappropriate", Michael Sottile filed a lawsuit in Berkshire Superior Court against the DeSisto School seeking the recovery of almost $350,000 in damages that an arbitrator ordered the school to pay him after a default judgment six months previously found he had not been paid for his services.

== Personal life ==
DeSisto's father was a building contractor who died when DeSisto was 11 years old. DeSisto has a brother Joseph, and a sister Jacqueline who is deceased. In 1987 DeSisto married Margie Charles Bullock in a ceremony on the Stockbridge campus lasting three days that included two live elephants, three hot air balloons, and fireworks. The noise disrupted a concert going on at the nearby Tanglewood.

== Death ==
DeSisto died on November 1, 2003, from cerebral hemorrhage, several days after receiving a kidney transplant.
