= List of health-related charity fundraisers =

This list of health related charity fundraisers includes events designed to raise funds to fight disease and improve health.

== Bike rides ==
| Name | Goal | Started | Location | Minimum |
|---|---|---|---|---|
| Aids/Lifecycle | Raise funds for San Francisco AIDS Foundation and Jeffery Goodman Clinic of Los Angeles Gay and Lesbian Center to support those who do not have health insurance | 1994 as California Aids Ride - changed to Aids/Lifecycle in 2002 | San Francisco to Los Angeles - 545 miles - 1 week. | $3,000 per person to participate |
| Vegas In 24 | Raises funds for low-income, uninsured and underinsured women in need of breast cancer screening, diagnosis and treatment | April 2016 | Los Angeles to Las Vegas - 365 Miles - 1 Day | None |
| London to Brighton Bike Ride | Fundraising for British Heart Foundation | 1980 (for BHF) | London | None |
| Pelotonia | Cancer Research at James Cancer Hospital | 2008 | Columbus and central Ohio | $1200 |
| Illini 4000 for Cancer | Fundraiser for cancer research and patient support services | 2006 | University of Illinois at Urbana–Champaign | $3500 |
| Ride for Heart | Heart and stroke research | 1987 | Toronto | None |
| Ride for the Cure | Curing breast cancer | 2006 2010 | Paepcke Park, Aspen, Colorado Ann Arbor, Michigan | $500 $500 |
| Sydney Body Art Ride | funding children's cancer research | ? | Sydney, Australia | all participants donate $2 |
| Volvo Best Buddies Challenge | enhancing the lives of people with intellectual disabilities | ? | Boston and Northern California, United States | ? |
| Ride For A Cause | AIDS and breast cancer | 2006 | International: Galway, Ireland; Marche Italy; Catalonia, Spain; other locations. | Participants are asked to raise a minimum of $1,000 with 100% going to the charities. |
| Norwood Challenge International Bike Ride | Helping mentally and physically disabled people, underprivileged children and their families | 1992 | International: Israel, Rajasthan India, Cape Town South Africa, Cambodia-Vietnam, Trans-America, Cuba, others | Participants are required to pay an entry fee of £450 and then raise a minimum of £2500 for the Israel bike ride or £2750 for the others |
| Colomba Chemo Classic | Charity bike ride in aid of Cancer Research UK | 2009 | Richmond, North Yorkshire | £15 entry fee |
| ALS TDI Tri-State Trek | The ride to End ALS | 6/27-6/29 2014 | Newton, MA to Greenwich, CT | $185 Reg / $1800 Fundraising |
| London Bikeathon | Charity bike ride dedicated to blood cancer research | 1997 | London, England | £25 for 26 mile route, £50 for 100 mile route |
| Closer to Free | Ride to raise money for cancer research at Yale New Haven Hospital | ? | New Haven, CT | $100 Child, $200 Adult |

== Climbs ==
| Name | Goal | Started | Location | Minimum |
|---|---|---|---|---|
| Climb to Fight Breast Cancer | Support breast cancer research and to increase awareness for the prevention, detection and treatment of breast cancer. | 1997 | 12 mountains: Denali, Kilimanjaro, Elbrus, Iztaccihuatl, Pico de Orizaba, Mount Hood, Mount Rainier, Mount Adams, Mount Baker, Mount Shasta, Mount St. Helens, and Everest Base Camp. | $200 or $500 registration fee depending on peak climbed. Minimum fund raising amount $3,000 |

== Runs ==
Note that all runs allow jogging and walking.

| Name | Goal | Started | Location | Minimum |
|---|---|---|---|---|
| Entertainment Industry Foundation Revlon Run/Walk For Women | to raise awareness and fund women's cancers research, counseling and outreach programs | 1993 | Los Angeles, California and New York, New York | $25 registration fee |
| Father's Day Run/Walk | Support research to fight prostate cancer | ? | Calgary, Edmonton, Halifax, Toronto | None |
| Miles for Men (men only) | Raise funds for cancer charities | 2012 | United Kingdom | None |
| Race for Life (women only) | cancer research | ? | United Kingdom | ? |
| Race for the Cure | curing breast cancer | 1983 | 125 locations across the United States and three international races | some locations charge entry fees |
| Run for Moore (men only) | fight bowel cancer | ? | United Kingdom | ? |
| Run for the Cure | Support research to fight breast cancer | 1992 | 53 communities across Canada (2007) | None |
| Roparun | helping people with Cancer | 1992 | Between Paris and Rotterdam | ? |
| Team in Training | Leukemia & Lymphoma Society | ? | ? | ? |
| Train to End Stroke | ending strokes | ? | ? | minimums vary by location |
| World AIDS Marathon | helping people with AIDS | 2004 | 2004: Kenya; 2005: Gainesville, Florida; 2006: multiple locations | entry fee |

- Race for the Cure, Team Heather (2003-Current)

== Walks ==
| Name | Goal | Started | Location | Minimum |
|---|---|---|---|---|
| AIDS Walk | fight AIDS | 1987 | 75+ locations across the United States | no minimum; "Star Walkers" are participants who pledge to raise $1,000+ |
| Avon Walk for Breast Cancer | Curing breast cancer | 2003 | 9 cities: Houston, Washington DC, Boston, Chicago, Rocky Mountains, San Francisco, Los Angeles, New York, Charlotte | participants are required to raise a minimum of $1,800 |
| Be The Match Walk+Run | Raising funds to help patients with blood cancers | Unknown | 13 cities: Atlanta, Charlotte, Columbus, Dallas/Fort Worth, Houston, Long Beach, Minneapolis, Phoenix, Portland (OR), Richmond, San Jose, St. Louis, and Tampa | Entry fees apply (varies by age and day of registration) |
| Glam-A-THON | Curing breast cancer | 2003 | 1 city: Ft. Lauderdale | Kiss Breast Cancer Goodbye |
| Shine | Shine is a night-time walking marathon which uses light as a symbol of hope and progress in the fight against cancer. | 2010 | Glasgow, Manchester and London (2011) | Entry fee |
| Light The Night Walk | cure leukemia, lymphoma, Hodgkin's disease and myeloma | ? | ? | ? |
| MDA Muscle Walk | awareness, support and research for curing muscular dystrophy | 2010 | multiple locations across the United States | No minimum, though donations are recommended. |
| March for Babies (formerly WalkAmerica) | prevent premature births | 1970 | 1,100 the United States | no minimum |
| Memory Walk | awareness, support and research for curing Alzheimer's disease | | Memory Walk is an event to raise awareness and funds for Alzheimer care, support and research. | no minimum to participate |
| MS Challenge Walk | curing multiple sclerosis | 2002 | multiple locations across the United States | participants are required to raise a minimum of $1,500 |
| National Kidney Foundation's Kidney Walk | raise funds to fight kidney disease nationwide | 2008 | multiple locations across the United States | no minimum |
| Relay For Life | raise awareness and funds for cancer | 1986 | 4,800+ locations across the United States | no minimum; there is a $10 registration fee |
| Step Out: Walk to Fight Diabetes | Fund diabetes research | 1990 | 200+ locations across the United States | no minimum |
| Susan G. Komen 3-Day for the Cure | raise awareness and funds for breast cancer | 2003 | 14 locations across the United States (2008) | walk participants are required to raise $2,200; crew members register for $90; volunteers participate free |
| Weekend to End Breast Cancer | Curing Breast Cancer | 2003 | Calgary, Edmonton, Montreal, Ottawa, Toronto, Vancouver, Winnipeg | participants are required to raise a minimum of $2,000 |
| Walk For A Cause | Fighting AIDS and Breast Cancer | 2006 | International: Galway, Ireland; Marche Italy; Catalonia, Spain; other locations. | Participants are asked to raise a minimum of $1,000 with 100% going to the charities. |
| Walk For Wishes | Bringing wishes to kids with life-threatening illnesses. | 2000s | multiple locations across the United States. | ADULTS: $15. KIDS: $10. WISHKIDS and VIRTUAL PARTICIPANTS: Free; Participants are asked to raise a minimum of $100. |
| Walk For PKD | Raise awareness and funds for polycystic kidney disease | 2001 | 50+ locations across the US, starting in September | no minimum, no registration fee |
| National Psoriasis Walk for Awareness | generate awareness about psoriasis and psoriatic arthritis | 2007 | 8 locations across the United States and a "Virtual Walk" | participants are asked to raise $100; there is a $25 registration fee |
| Walk to End MS | raise awareness, generate funds for the national research program and find a cure for multiple sclerosis | 1991 | 24 locations in British Columbia & the Yukon, 12 locations in Alberta, 16 locations in Saskatchewan, 10 locations in Manitoba, 58 locations in Ontario, 22 locations in Quebec, 13 locations in Atlantic Canada | ? |
| Team in Training | Leukemia & Lymphoma Society | ? | ? | ? |
| The Kidney Foundation of Canada's Give the Gift of Life Walk | Generate awareness about, and raise funds for, kidney disease and organ and tissue donation | 2006 | Grassroots initiative with over 30 walk locations across Ontario during the month of September | No minimum fee |

== Poker Tournament ==
| Name | Goal | Started | Location | Minimum |
|---|---|---|---|---|
| Chance for Life | Pediatric Cancer Research | 2004 | Washington D.C. | Spectator $125 |

== Dance fitness ==
| Name | Goal | Started | Location | Minimum |
|---|---|---|---|---|
| ZUMBATHON | various: (breast cancer, earthquake relief, Croh's and colitis) | 2010 | various US cities | typically $10–$20 |
