= Barendrecht =

- Town and municipality
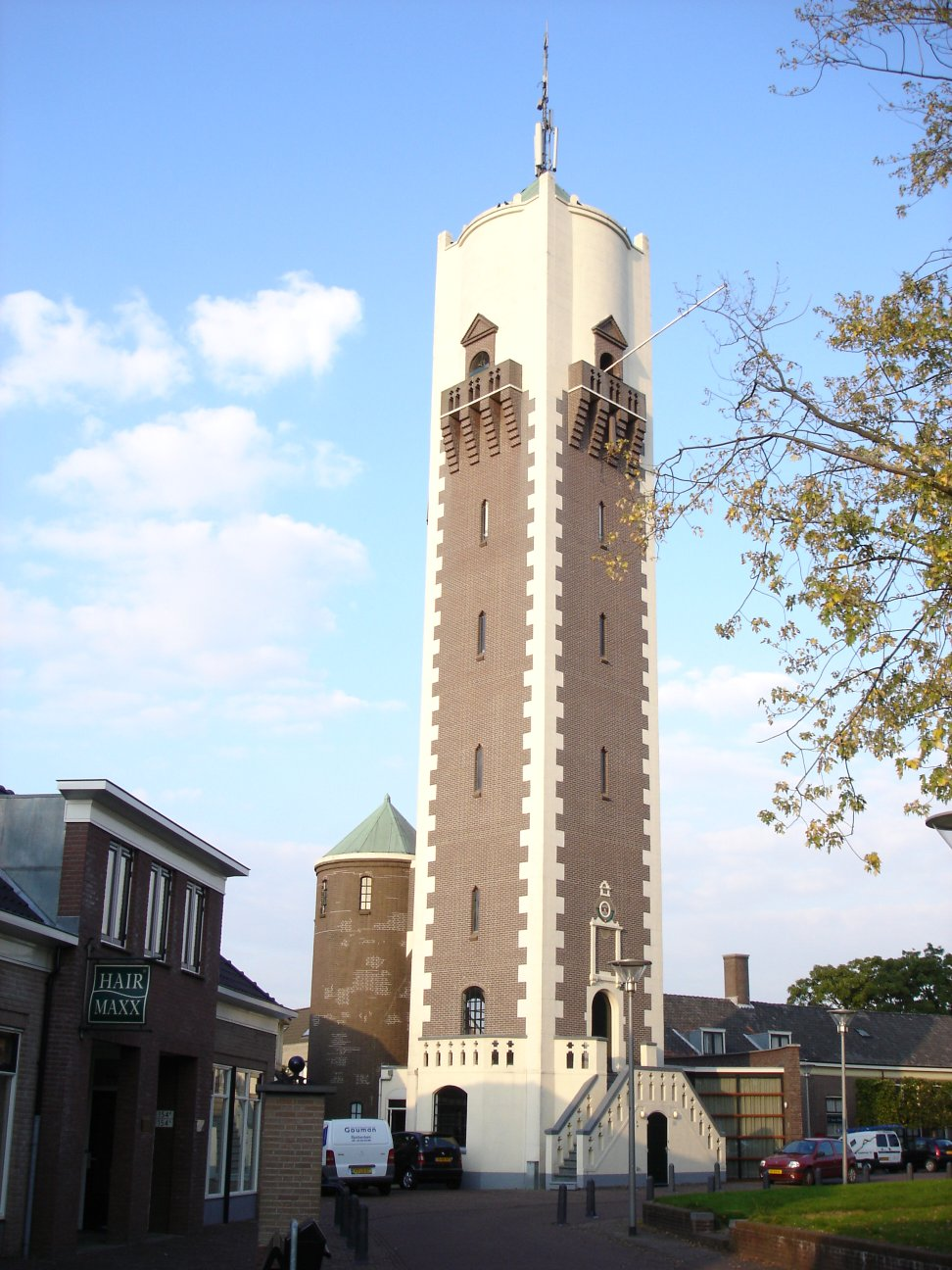
- Water tower of Barendrecht

- Flag Coat of arms

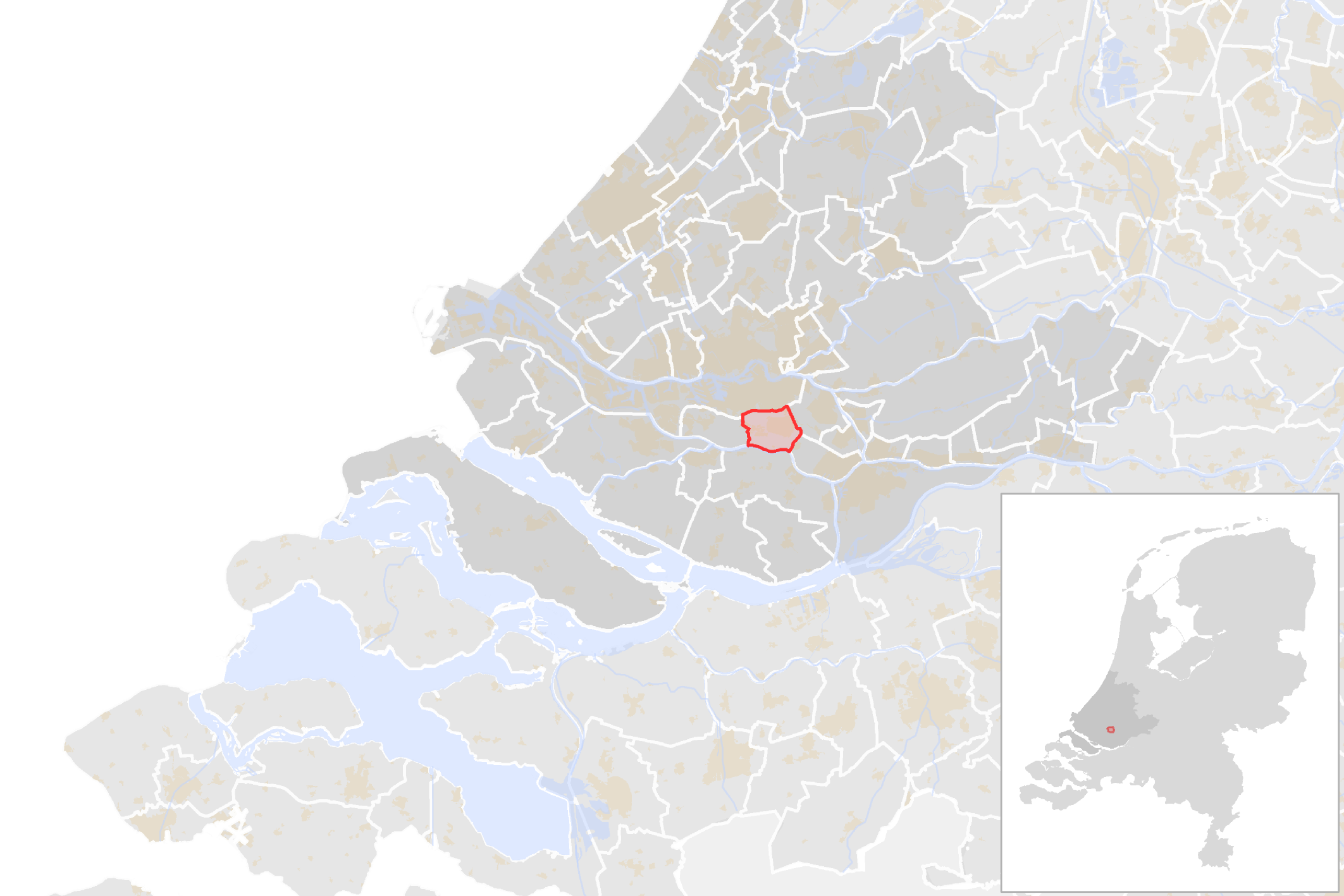
- Location in South Holland
- Coordinates: 51°51′N 4°32′E
- Country: Netherlands
- Province: South Holland

Government
  - Body: Municipal council
  - Mayor: Govert Veldhuizen (acting) (CDA)

Area
  - Total: 21.73 km^{2} (8.39 sq mi)
  - Land: 19.75 km^{2} (7.63 sq mi)
  - Water: 1.98 km^{2} (0.76 sq mi)
- Elevation: −1 m (−3.3 ft)

Population (January 2021)
  - Total: 48,643
  - Density: 2,463/km^{2} (6,380/sq mi)
- Demonym: Barendrechter
- Time zone: UTC+1 (CET)
  - Summer (DST): UTC+2 (CEST)
- Postcode: 2990–2994
- Area code: 0180
- Website: www.barendrecht.nl

Barendrecht (Dutch: [ˈbaːrə(n)ˌdrɛxt]) is a town and municipality in the west of the Netherlands, near Rotterdam, South Holland. The municipality had a population of 48,643 in 2021, and covers an area of 21.73 km^{2} (8.39 sq mi) of which 1.98 km^{2} (0.76 sq mi) is water.

The municipality of Barendrecht also includes Barendrecht-Carnisselande and Smitshoek.

== History ==
The name "Barendrecht" is derived from the Germanic word birni, translated as "mud" or "muddy", and the Latin word trāiectum translated as "to cross (a river)" to denote a muddy river crossing.

The current municipality of Barendrecht is located in the area of three former fiefdoms: East-Barendrecht, West-Barendrecht, and Carnisse. The oldest reference to East-Barendrecht is from 1264. These fiefdoms were in Riederwaard, an area reclaimed from water since the 12th century but had to deal with frequent dike breaches throughout the 13th and 14th centuries. Further stages in land reclamation, constituting the major part of modern Barendrecht, were the Binnenland polder (1484), Buitenland polder (1555) and Zuidpolder (1649).

During the French Period, the three fiefdoms were merged into one municipality Barendrecht. After the French Period, it was split into East and West-Barendrecht, but in 1836 it was again united as one municipality.

== Demographics ==
Historical population

Year	Pop.	±%
1930	4,799	—
1935	5,413	+12.8%
1940	5,909	+9.2%
1945	7,286	+23.3%
1950	7,264	−0.3%
1955	7,707	+6.1%
1960	8,809	+14.3%
1965	10,408	+18.2%
1970	12,832	+23.3%
1975	14,687	+14.5%

Year	Pop.	±%
1980	16,633	+13.2%
1985	18,539	+11.5%
1990	19,937	+7.5%
1995	22,025	+10.5%
2000	28,834	+30.9%
2005	39,310	+36.3%
2010	46,453	+18.2%
2015	47,521	+2.3%
2020	48,714	+2.5%

Source: Municipality of Barendrecht, CBS

Historical number of homes

Year	Homes	±%
1965	2,763	—
1970	3,587	+29.8%
1975	4,510	+25.7%
1980	5,402	+19.8%
1985	6,403	+18.5%

Year	Homes	±%
1990	7,208	+12.6%
1995	8,473	+17.5%
2000	11,279	+33.1%
2005	15,312	+35.8%
2010	18,286	+19.4%

Source: Municipality of Barendrecht

The population of Barendrecht increased ten-fold in the last 80 years from just under 5,000 in 1930 to close to 50,000 in 2010. During this time the number of homes increased as well, there was an eight-fold increase in the number of homes in the last 50 years from 2,200 in 1961 to 18,400 in 2011. The overall population increased, whereas the number of persons per household decreased. This is consistent with the general trend in the Netherlands over this period.

In 2021, Barendrecht had a population of 48,771, of which 23,231 were male (49.4%) and 23,825 female (50.6%). According to the civil registry, 21% of its population were under the age of 14, 11% were between 15 and 24 years old, 27% were from 25 to 44, 28% were from 45 to 64 and 13% were 65 years of age or older. The marital status of the municipality was distributed such that 46% of its population was married, 45% never married, 6% divorced and 4% widowed. 26,08% of the population of Barendrecht was from foreign origin. The foreign origin of the municipality was 7,99% Western, 4% Suriname, 3% Turkey, 2% Morocco, 1% Dutch Caribbean and 8,81% from other countries.

Barendrecht had 18,615 households in 2012, this corresponds to an average of 2.5 persons per household. Of these households, 24% were made up of individuals, 30% were couples with no children under 18 living with them and 45% contained children under 18.

== Geography ==
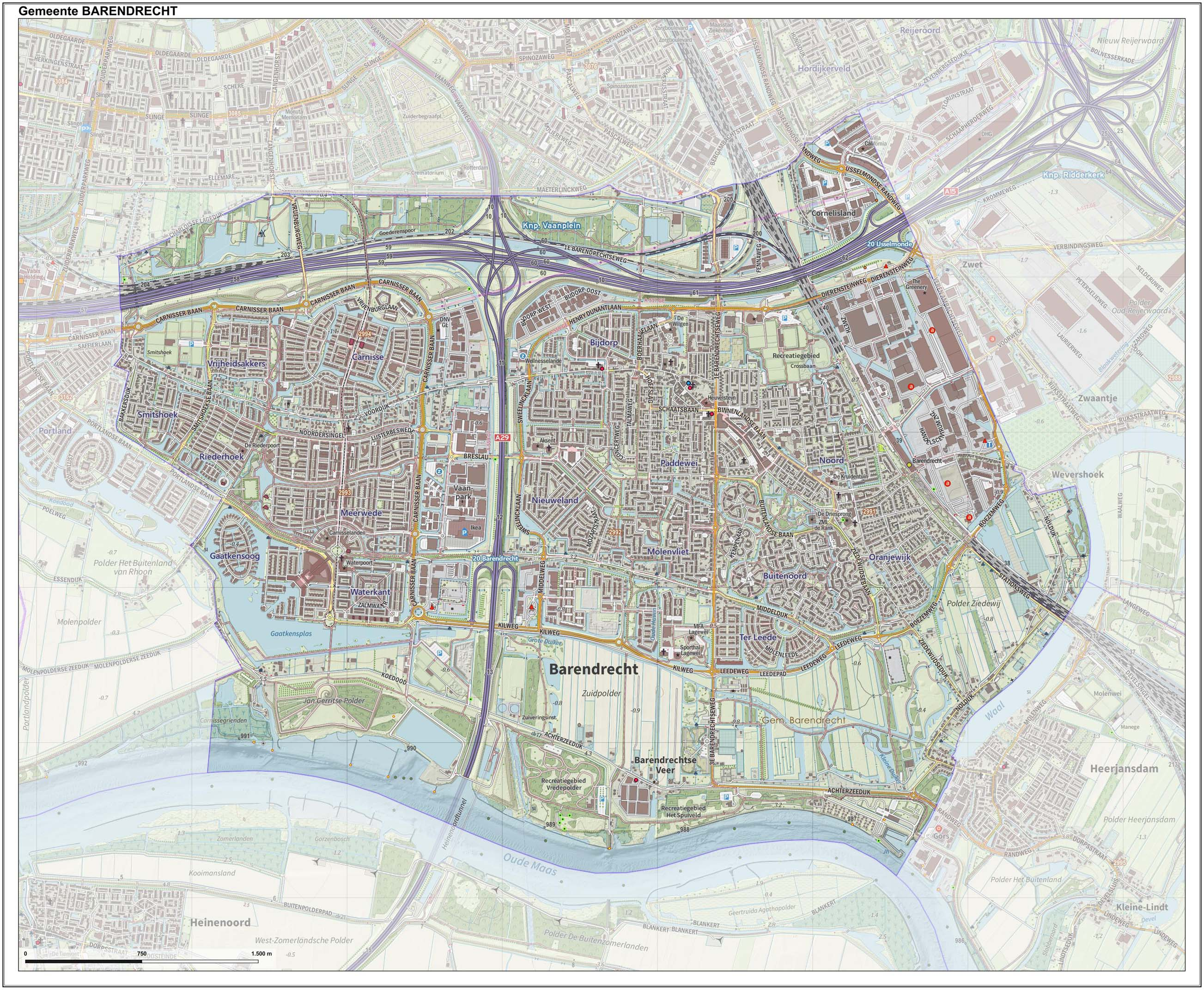
Topographic map of Barendrecht

=== Subdivisions ===
Municipalities are the lowest tier of public administration in the Netherlands. They are, however, further subdivided into districts (wijken) and neighbourhoods (buurten) for administrative use. Barendrecht is subdivided into 23 districts, of which 20 are residential, two rural and one all business parks combined. The latter three have the lowest population density and largest area of all districts. The district with the highest population is Meerwede in Vinex-location Carnisselande, this district also has the highest population density. Each district is further subdivided in neighbourhoods. Some district consist of one neighbourhood, others consist of up to 14 neighbourhoods; the rural and business park districts are subdivided the most. The smallest neighbourhood has a size of 0.07 km^{2} (0.027 sq mi), the largest spans 1.69 km^{2} (0.65 sq mi). Some neighbourhoods are unpopulated; the largest population density for a neighbourhood in Barendrecht is 9,691/km^{2} (25,100/sq mi).

Districts of Barendrecht
District	Population	Population density	Land area	Water area	Map
Centre	1,495	3,356/km^{2} (8,690/sq mi)	0.45 km^{2} (0.17 sq mi)	0 km^{2} (0 sq mi)	Location of Centrum district in Barendrecht
North	2,580	2,993/km^{2} (7,750/sq mi)	0.86 km^{2} (0.33 sq mi)	0 km^{2} (0 sq mi)	Location of Noord district in Barendrecht
Binnenland	1,020	6,932/km^{2} (17,950/sq mi)	.15 km^{2} (0.058 sq mi)	0 km^{2} (0 sq mi)	Location of Binnenland district in Barendrecht
Oranjewijk	2,015	3,724/km^{2} (9,650/sq mi)	0.54 km^{2} (0.21 sq mi)	0 km^{2} (0 sq mi)	Location of Oranjewijk district in Barendrecht
Buitenoord	3,685	5,744/km^{2} (14,880/sq mi)	0.64 km^{2} (0.25 sq mi)	0.01 km^{2} (0.0039 sq mi)	Location of Buitenoord district in Barendrecht
Ter Leede	1,345	4,844/km^{2} (12,550/sq mi)	0.28 km^{2} (0.11 sq mi)	0 km^{2} (0 sq mi)	Location of Ter Leede district in Barendrecht
Paddewei	2,030	6,265/km^{2} (16,230/sq mi)	0.32 km^{2} (0.12 sq mi)	0 km^{2} (0 sq mi)	Location of Paddewei district in Barendrecht
Molenvliet	2,950	7,397/km^{2} (19,160/sq mi)	0.40 km^{2} (0.15 sq mi)	0 km^{2} (0 sq mi)	Location of Molenvliet district in Barendrecht
Nieuweland	5,400	5,791/km^{2} (15,000/sq mi)	0.93 km^{2} (0.36 sq mi)	0.01 km^{2} (0.0039 sq mi)	Location of Nieuwelanddistrict in Barendrecht
Dorpzicht	580	2,588/km^{2} (6,700/sq mi)	0.22 km^{2} (0.085 sq mi)	0 km^{2} (0 sq mi)	Location of Dorpzicht district in Barendrecht
Bijdorp	1,530	5,631/km^{2} (14,580/sq mi)	0.27 km^{2} (0.10 sq mi)	0 km^{2} (0 sq mi)	Location of Bijdorp district in Barendrecht
Smitshoek	1,525	4,274/km^{2} (11,070/sq mi)	0.36 km^{2} (0.14 sq mi)	0.01 km^{2} (0.0039 sq mi)	Location of Smitshoek district in Barendrecht
Voordijk	790	1,897/km^{2} (4,910/sq mi)	0.42 km^{2} (0.16 sq mi)	0.01 km^{2} (0.0039 sq mi)	Location of Voordijk district in Barendrecht
Meerwede	6,285	9,144/km^{2} (23,680/sq mi)	0.69 km^{2} (0.27 sq mi)	0.07 km^{2} (0.027 sq mi)	Location of Meerwede district in Barendrecht
Waterkant	1,900	8,205/km^{2} (21,250/sq mi)	0.23 km^{2} (0.089 sq mi)	0 km^{2} (0 sq mi)	Location of Waterkant district in Barendrecht
Havenkwartier	1,680	8,515/km^{2} (22,050/sq mi)	0.20 km^{2} (0.077 sq mi)	0.02 km^{2} (0.0077 sq mi)	Location of Havenkwartier district in Barendrecht
Gaatkensoog	770	5,769/km^{2} (14,940/sq mi)	0.13 km^{2} (0.050 sq mi)	0.07 km^{2} (0.027 sq mi)	Location of Gaatkensoog district in Barendrecht
Riederhoek	1,495	6,397/km^{2} (16,570/sq mi)	0.23 km^{2} (0.089 sq mi)	0.03 km^{2} (0.012 sq mi)	Location of Riederhoek district in Barendrecht
Vrijheidsakker	1,155	4,010/km^{2} (10,400/sq mi)	0.29 km^{2} (0.11 sq mi)	0 km^{2} (0 sq mi)	Location of Vrijhoekakker district in Barendrecht
Vrijenburg	5,140	4,949/km^{2} (12,820/sq mi)	1.04 km^{2} (0.40 sq mi)	0.03 km^{2} (0.012 sq mi)	Location of Vrijenburg district in Barendrecht
Outlying areas North	170	77/km^{2} (200/sq mi)	2.22 km^{2} (0.86 sq mi)	0.12 km^{2} (0.046 sq mi)	Location of Buitengebied Noord district in Barendrecht
Outlying areas South	1,445	243/km^{2} (630/sq mi)	5.96 km^{2} (2.30 sq mi)	1.46 km^{2} (0.56 sq mi)	Location of Buitengebied Zuid district in Barendrecht
Business parks	60	20/km^{2} (52/sq mi)	3.00 km^{2} (1.16 sq mi)	0.05 km^{2} (0.019 sq mi)	Location of Bedrijventerreinen district in Barendrecht

== Sports ==
Barendrecht is home to two football clubs; BVV Barendrecht, which plays at the fourth level of the Dutch football pyramid, and VV Smitshoek which plays at the fifth tier of the football pyramid. BVV Barendrecht won the KNVB Amateur Cup in the 2008–09 season, they were banned from the 2011–12 KNVB Cup after winning their first round matchup. In addition to these clubs there are also numerous other sport clubs, including organized badminton, basketball, handball, hockey, korfball, tennis, track and field, volleyball and water polo. Due to its proximity to Rotterdam, Barendrecht occasionally is the scene for road events starting or finishing in Rotterdam, it is the penultimate municipality on the route of the 520 km (320 mi) annual Paris-Rotterdam relay run.

Athletes from Barendrecht have also had individual success, mostly notably quadruple Olympic swimming champion Inge de Bruijn. She won four gold medals, two silver medals and two bronze medals in the freestyle and butterfly events at the 2000 and 2004 Summer Olympics. During her career she won a total of 36 medals in major competitions, 18 of these medals were gold. She has also held three world records in long course swimming. Several players on the Dutch water polo teams during the 1984 and 2000 Summer Olympics were from Barendrecht as well.

== Government ==
Barendrecht, as all Dutch municipalities, is ruled by both a board of mayor and aldermen and a municipal council. The municipal council is elected every four years. The number of councillors varies over time due to changes in the municipal population. It is the highest administrative body in the municipality and controls public policy. The executive power lies with the executive board, which consists of a mayor and multiple aldermen. The mayor is appointed by the crown and the alderman are elected by the municipal council, typically after each municipal election.

After the 2026 Dutch municipal elections Echt voor Barendrecht, a local party, became the largest party, winning 14 out of 29 seats in the municipal council. After the election, the seat distribution is as follows:

Party	Seats
Echt voor Barendrecht	14 / 29
Barendrechts Belang	3 / 29
Progressive Netherlands	3 / 29
Christian Union–SGP	3 / 29
Christian Democratic Appeal	2 / 29
People’s Party for Freedom and Democracy	2 / 29
Democrats 66	1 / 29
Samen voor Barendrecht	1 / 29

As of 15 July 2026, the municipal executive consists of three coalition parties: Echt voor Barendrecht (EVB), Progressive Netherlands (PRO) and SGP-ChristianUnion (SGP-CU).

Municipal Executive
Name	Portfolio	Party
Ronald Schneider	Mayor	Independent
Lennart van der Linden	Alderman, First Deputy Mayor	EVB
Margo Stolk	Alderwoman	EVB
Esther Punte	Alderwoman	PRO
Corno Christianen	Alderman	SGP-CU

== Infrastructure ==
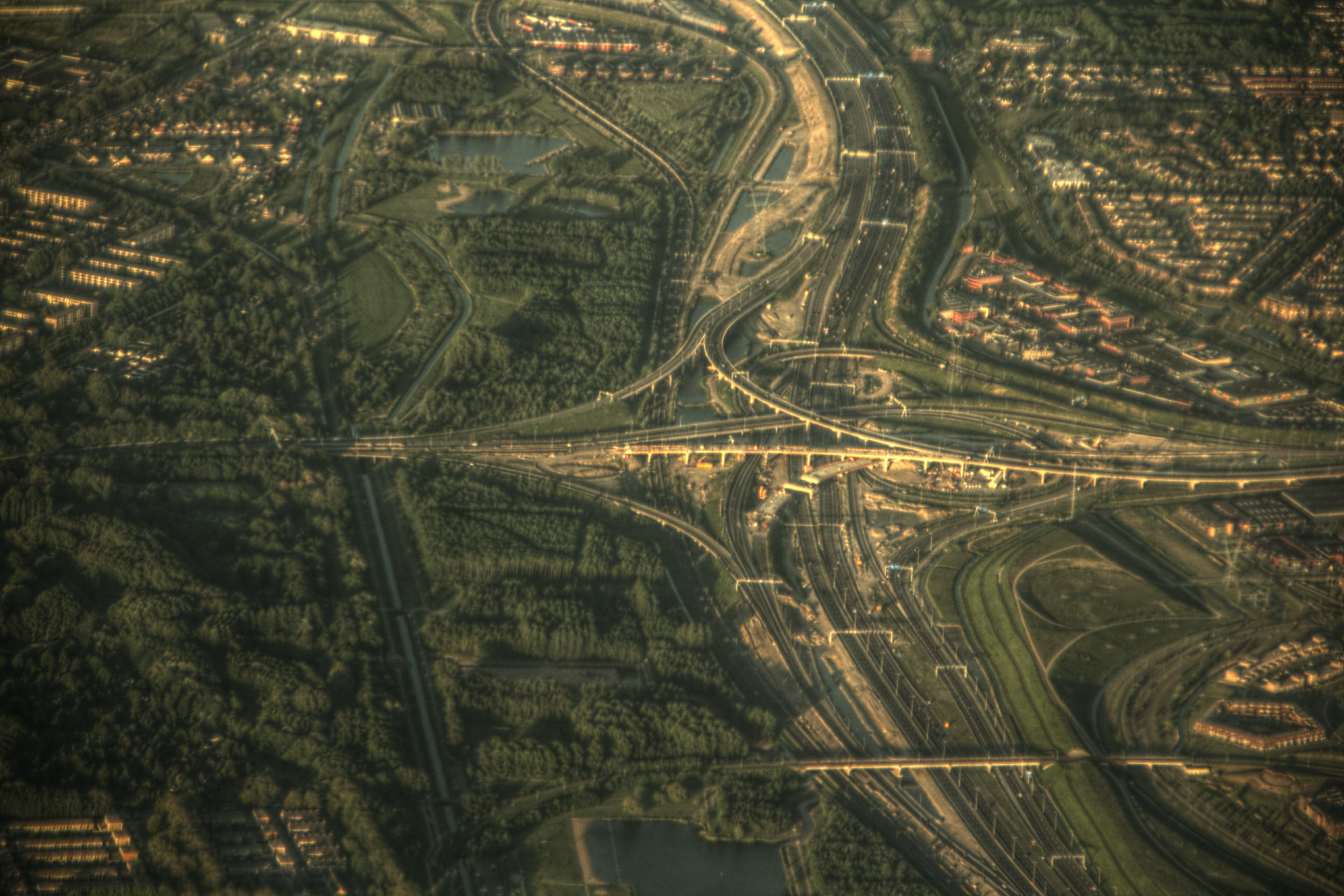
Vaanplein interchange

=== Road ===
Two Dutch motorways pass through Barendrecht:

- The A15 runs west to east along the northern part of the town and is part of the Rotterdam ring road. Its exit at IJsselmonde is located in the north-east of Barendrecht.
- The A29 runs north to south and divides Smitshoek and Carnisselande from the rest of Barendrecht. Its exit at Barendrecht is located in the south of the municipality. South of Barendrecht, it passes through the Heinenoordtunnel under the Oude Maas.

Vaanplein, the interchange between the A15 and A29, is situated within the borders of Barendrecht.

=== Rail ===
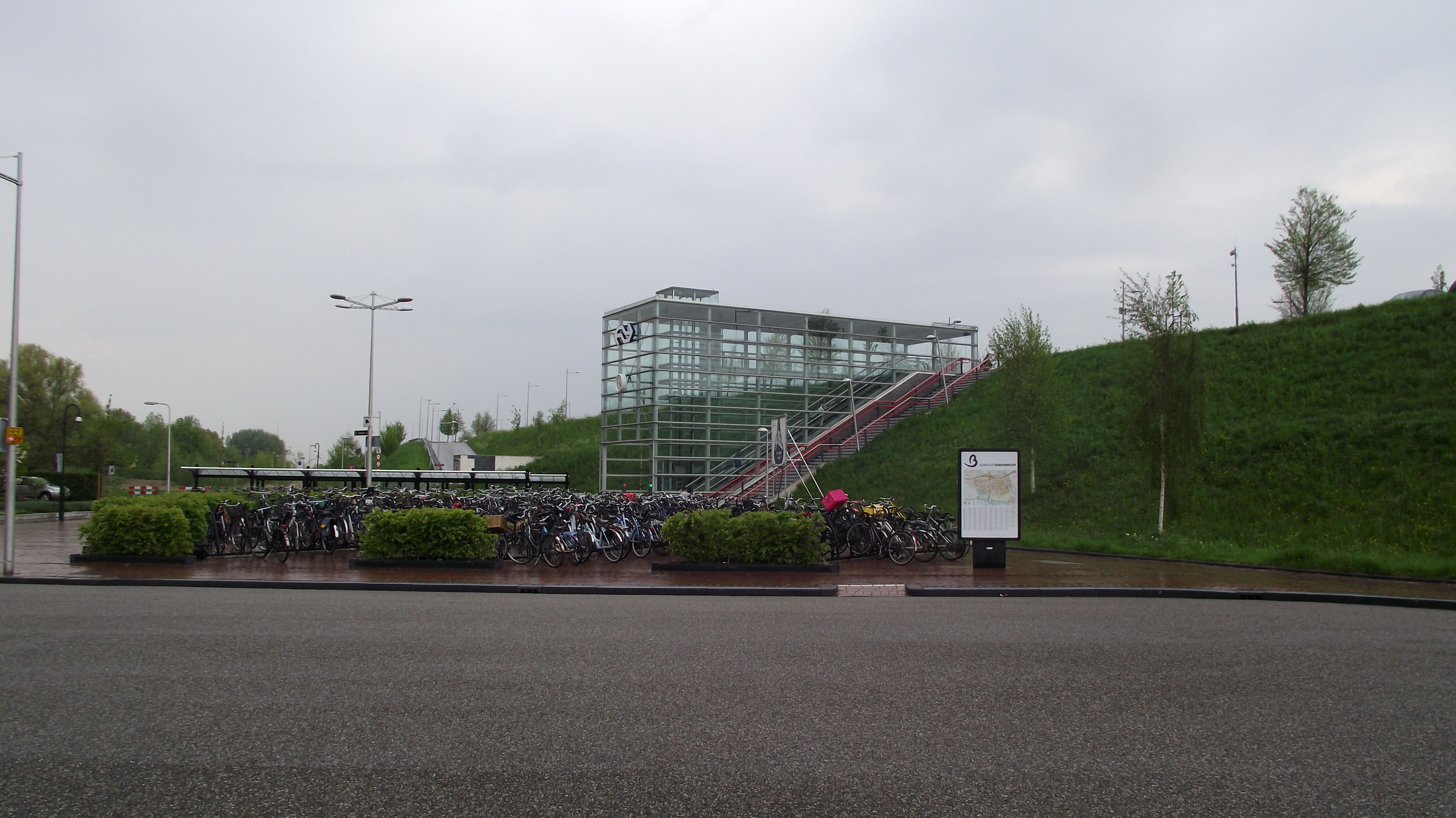
West entrance to the railway station

A number of railways pass through Barendrecht:

- The Breda–Rotterdam railway, originally known as Staatslijn I when it opened in 1872, runs along the east side of Barendrecht. The Barendrecht railway station is located on this line; it was initially opened in 1872 before moving to its current location in 2001.
- The HSL-Zuid is the high-speed rail line between Amsterdam and the Belgium border passing through Rotterdam. The southern section of the dedicated line branches off from the conventional line just north of Barendrecht and runs parallel to it through the town, but trains do not stop.
- The Betuweroute, a double track freight railway from Rotterdam to Germany, runs along the north and eastern sides of Barendrecht, at one point paralleling the passenger line and HSL-Zuid. Queen Beatrix opened this route in 2007.

The nine tracks of all three of these lines, which run through the railway station, are covered over a length of 1.5 km (0.9 mi) to reduce the noise to the surrounding neighbourhoods. Nederlandse Spoorwegen services the station, with trains departing towards Dordrecht to the southeast and Rotterdam to the northwest four times an hour during the day during weekdays, reduced to two times an hour during the rest of the railways' normal service hours.

A major junction between the three railway lines north of the station was the site of a train accident in 2009. Two freight trains collided head on, killing one of the drivers and serious injuring another. A passenger train could not stop in time and collided with the wreckage.

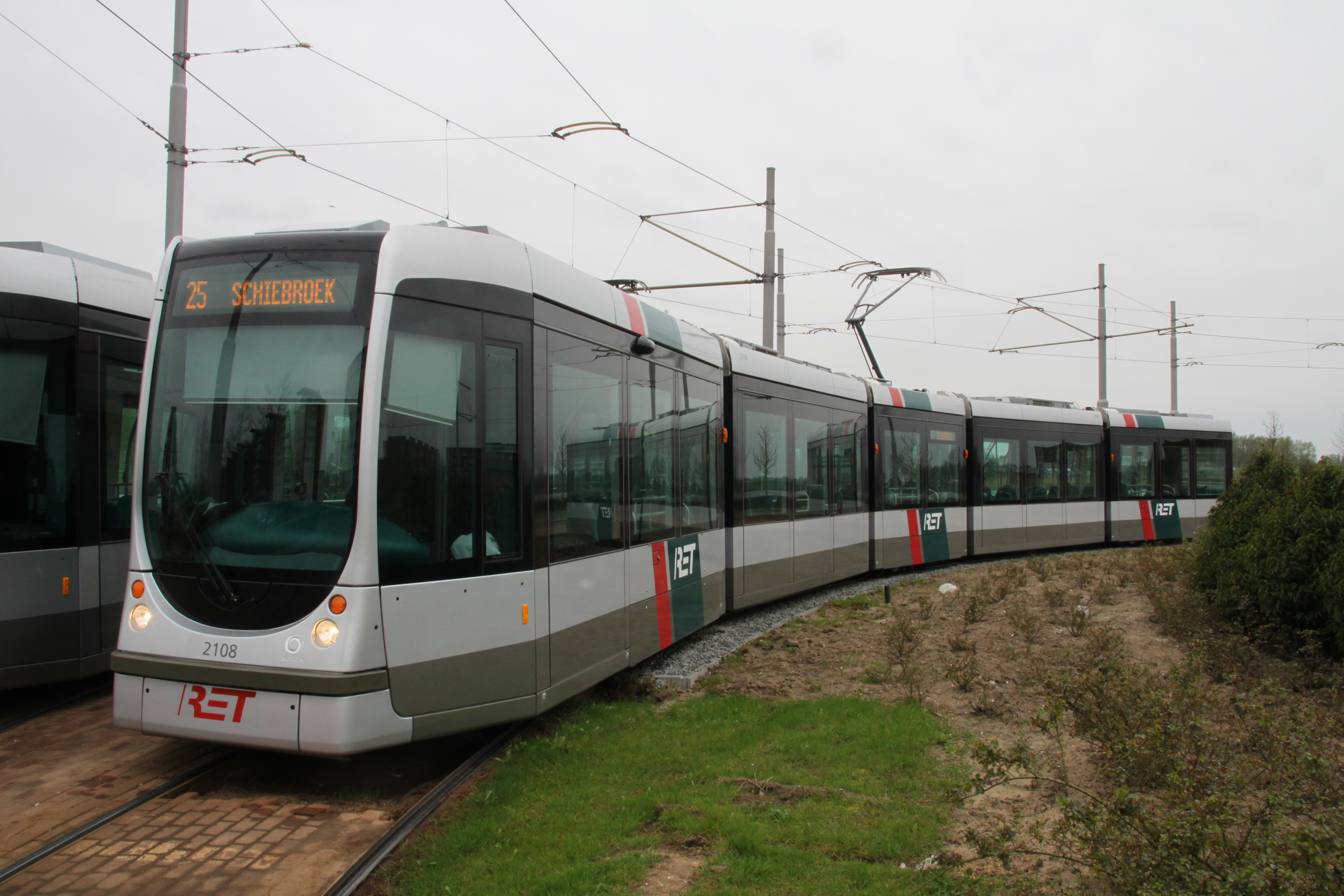
RET tram line 25 at its southern terminus of Carnisselande

=== Local public transit ===
As a suburb of Rotterdam, commuters in Barendrecht have access to extensive local transport services operated by RET, whose tram line 25 runs north-south through the western part of Barendrecht with its southern terminus in Carnisselande. The tram runs to the Rotterdam Centraal railway station through the city centre and beyond to its northern terminus in Schiebroek.

The RET also operates several bus lines through Barendrecht:

- three lines, via different routes, from the railway station to Zuidplein,
- a line from the railway station to Kralingse Zoom,
- a short local route from Zuidplein to the Barendrecht community of Smitshoek, and
- another short line departing from the east side of the railway station.

Arriva runs two additional bus lines: a line from city hall to the Heinenoord bus terminal, and a line from the Barendrecht railway station to the Zwijndrecht railway station.

== Notable people ==
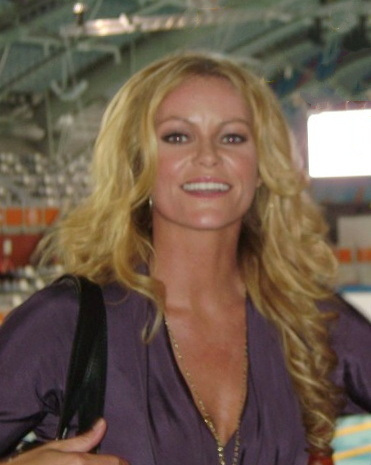
Inge de Bruijn, 2012

- Jack van den Berg (born 1959), trainer for major "amateur" clubs, won the Rinus Michels Award
- Inge de Bruijn (born 1973), former competitive swimmer, four-time Olympic champion and former world record-holder
- Anwar El Ghazi (born 1995), professional footballer, plays for both the Dutch national team and Premier League club Aston Villa
- Chayenne Ewijk (born 1988), former professional tennis player
- Anton Heiden (born 1960), former water polo player, participated in the 1984 Summer Olympics
- Finn Stokkers (born 1996), professional footballer with over 100 club caps
- Ties Theeuwkens (born 1985), professional basketball player, played 55 games for Dutch national basketball team
- Liz Weima (born 1968), former professional golfer

== Gallery ==
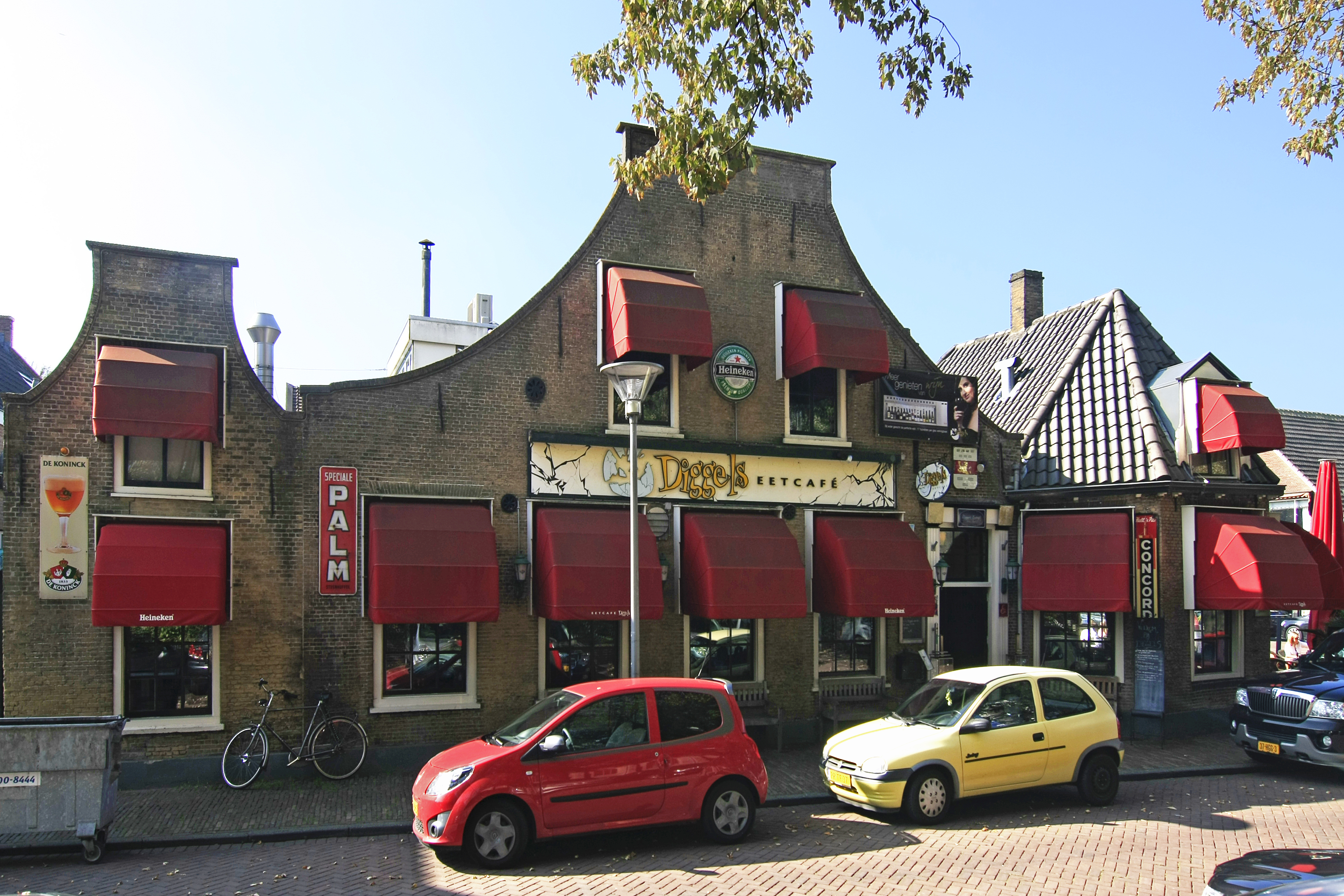
Dorpstraat141, Cafe met woonhuis

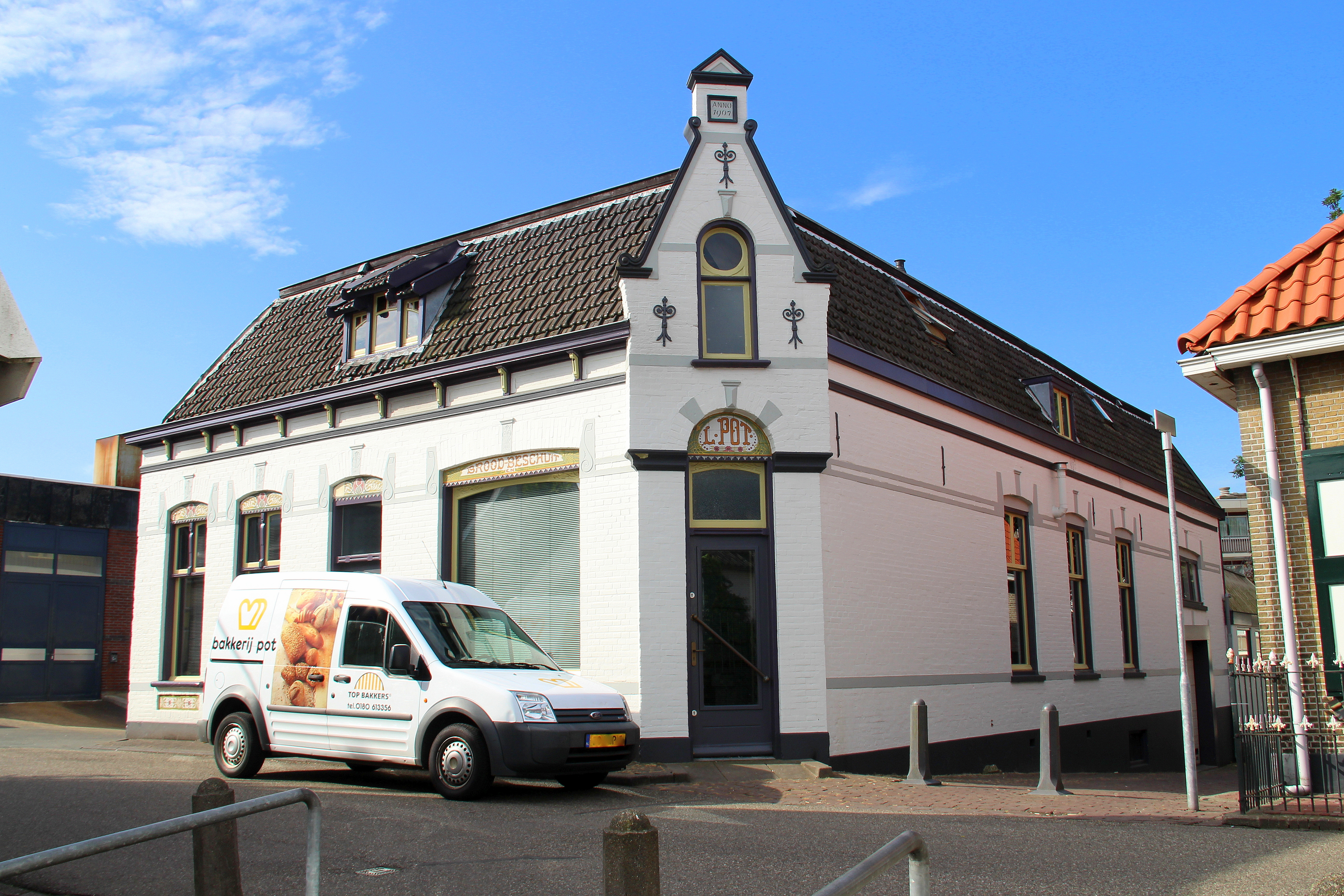
Barendrecht - Singel 29

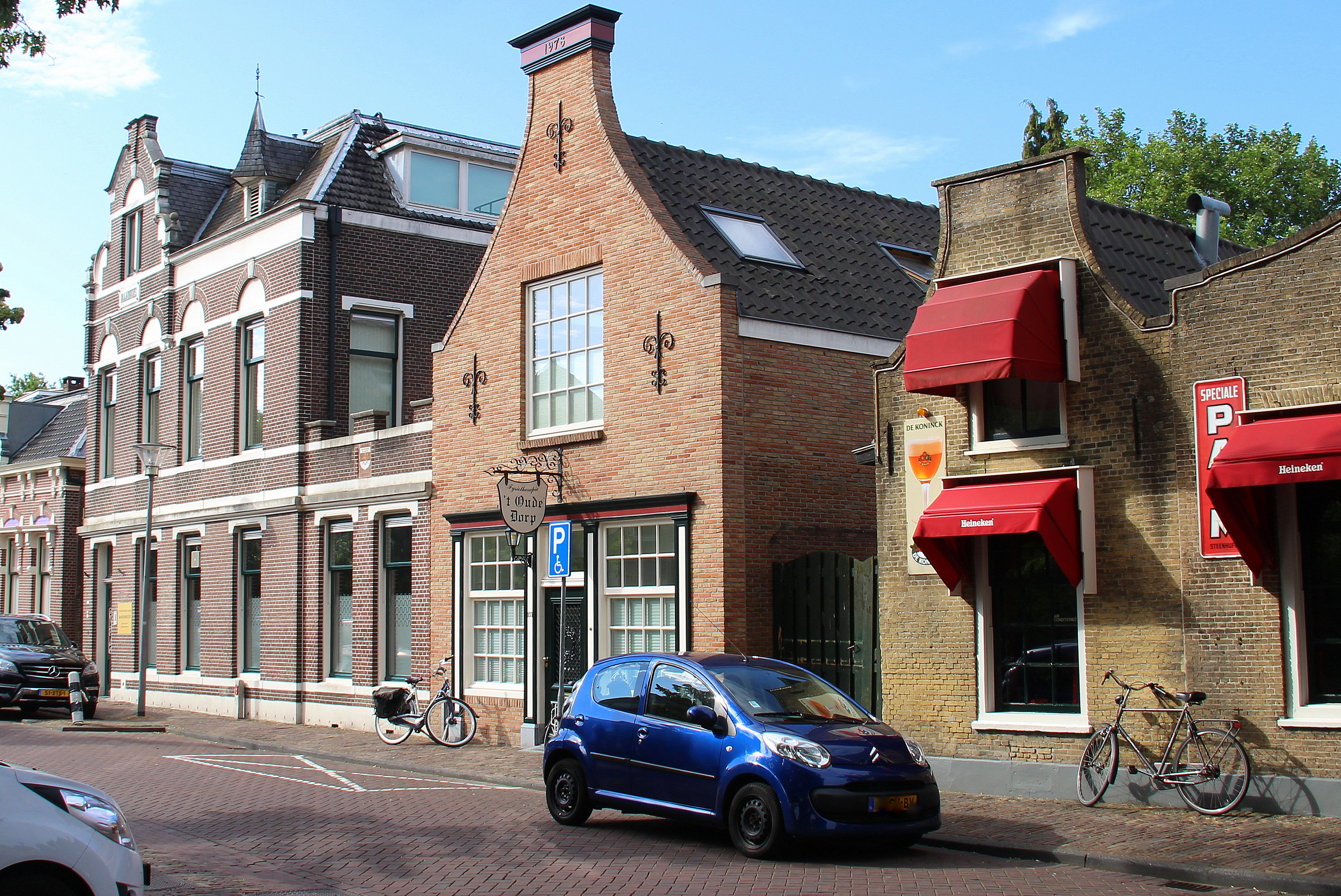
Voormalig raadhuis - Barendrecht - Dorpsstraat 137

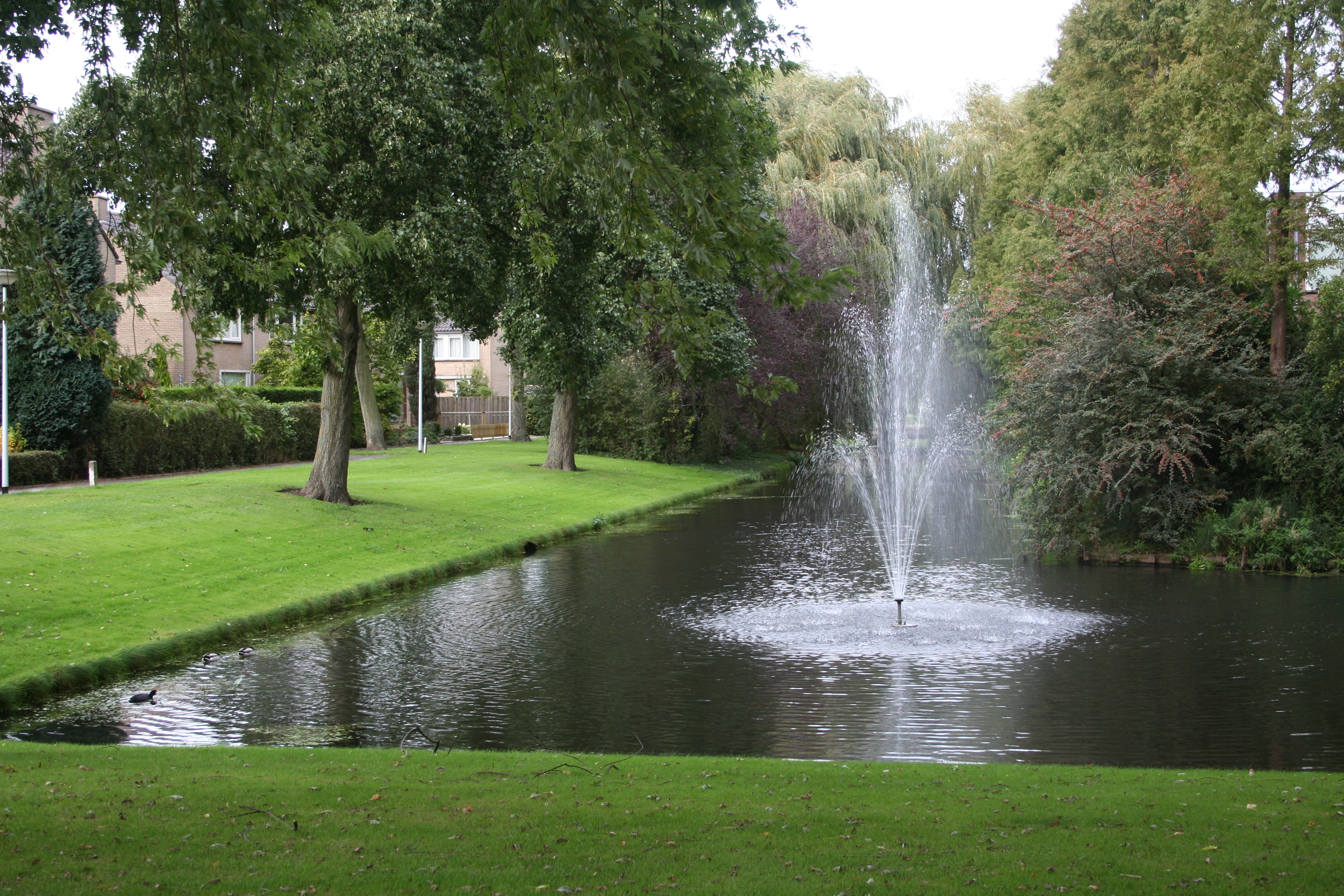
Barendrecht, - panoramio
