= Shine (fundraising event) =

Shine is Cancer Research UK's night-time walking marathon which uses light as a symbol of hope and the progress being made in the fight against cancer. Participants can choose to walk either 42.195 kilometres (26.219 mi) or 21.0975 kilometres (13.1094 mi) to raise awareness and funds for Cancer Research UK.

It is a fundraising event where those taking part can choose which cancer they want to beat and raise money for that area of cancer research.

In 2011 there will be Shine events in three cities in the UK - Glasgow, Manchester and London.

== See also ==
- Race for Life
- List of health related charity fundraisers
