= West-Barendrecht =

Former municipality in the Netherlands

Coordinates: 51°51′33″N 4°31′35″E

West-Barendrecht (Dutch pronunciation: [ʋɛstˈbaːrə(n)drɛxt]) is a former municipality in the Dutch province of South Holland. It covered the western part of the current municipality of Barendrecht, including the village of Carnisse.

The municipality existed between 1817 and 1837, when it merged with Oost-Barendrecht to form the new municipality "Oost- en West-Barendrecht", now just called "Barendrecht".
