= AIDS/LifeCycle =

Charity cycling tour in California, United States

AIDS/LifeCycle's logo

AIDS/LifeCycle (ALC), formerly known as California AIDS Ride from 1994 to 2002, was a seven-day cycling tour through California, starting in San Francisco and ending in Los Angeles. Since its start in 1994, the program has raised over $300 million for HIV- and AIDS-related services of the Los Angeles LGBT Center and San Francisco AIDS Foundation. The final ride occurred in 2025.

== Description ==
AIDS/LifeCycle is a charity event to raise money for HIV/AIDS services and raise HIV/AIDS awareness. Participants (riders, roadies, and staff) raise money throughout the year. In the first week of June, the riders cycle from San Francisco to Los Angeles with the support of the roadies and staff. For seven days, ALC passes through communities in California as a memorial to those who have died of AIDS and as an event to raise awareness about HIV/AIDS. Each day of riding can range from 40-100+ miles. At the end of each day of riding, cyclists arrive in a camp to eat, shower, and rest before riding out again the next morning. Currently (as of ALC 6-8) the route is a total of about 545 miles. Mileage may change due to route/road constructions and availability of campsites.

== History ==
In 2002, AIDS/LifeCycle was started by former Pallotta Teamworks Vice President Kevin Honeycutt, replacing the Pallotta Teamworks California AIDSRide after it was mired in controversy.

Logo TV produced a multiple episode show for its network called 'The Ride: 7 Days to End AIDS', which highlights the experiences of several cyclists, both those who have lost family and those who are HIV survivors.

In 2008, AIDS/LifeCycle closed registration early because of an unprecedented number of registrants.

In 2024, the San Francisco AIDS Foundation and Los Angeles LGBT Center announced the final year for the ride as 2025, due to increasing costs and the lack of funds as well as support to keep the event going each year. Since the COVID-19 pandemic, there was a large drop each year in attendance and fundraising costs.

== Totals by year ==
Year	Participants	Miles Ridden	Amount Raised
2025	2,100 cyclists 750 roadies	560.5	$17,840,000
2024	1,349 cyclists 547 roadies	537.3	$11,300,909
2023	1,457 cyclists 561 roadies	536.9	$11,860,000
2022	2,226 cyclists 573 roadies	545.9	$17,800,000
2021	1,961	-	$2,637,795
2020	3,738	-	$8,432,538
2019	2,200 cyclists 647 roadies	546.1	$16,797,717
2018	2,307 cyclists 659 roadies	552.1	$16,685,008
2017	2,231 cyclists 698 roadies	552.5	$15,309,609
2016	2,372 cyclists 620 roadies	542.8	$16,262,694
2015	2,401 cyclists 645 roadies	532.01	$16,675,273
2014	2,348 cyclists 589 roadies	532.25	$15,490,142
2013	2,205 cyclists 596 roadies	542	$14,511,424
2012	2,209 cyclists 568 roadies	542.6	$12,802,110
2011	2,362 cyclists 579 roadies	540.7	$13,357,701
2010	1,903 cyclists 542 roadies	559.2	$10,099,209
2009	2,158 cyclists 555 roadies	559.2	$11,059,923
2008	2,480 cyclists 531 roadies	538.6	$12,365,325
2007	2,343 cyclists 473 roadies	556.8	$10,685,176
2006	1,773 cyclists 395 roadies	546	$8,031,000
2005	1,611 cyclists 390 roadies	544.6	$7,156,000
2004	1,200 cyclists 378 roadies	574.7	$5,105,000
2003	1,009 cyclists 339 roadies	579.5	$4,258,000
2002	668 cyclists 251 roadies	601.7	$4,735,000
2001*	2,812	585	$11,583,000
2000*	2,664	585	$11,295,000
1999*	2,965	585	$11,607,000
1998*	2,612	585	$9,832,000
1997*	2,485	585	$9,442,000
1996*	2,183	585	$7,929,000
1995*	1,859	585	$5,349,000
1994*	478	585	$1,540,000

*as California AIDS Ride

== See also ==
- List of health related charity fundraisers
- AIDSRide
- Positive Pedalers
- AIDS Vaccine 200
