= Positive Pedalers =

Positive Pedalers is a non-profit 7 corporation for people with HIV/AIDS or supporters of people living with HIV/AIDS, which organizes bicycle-related activities.

== Name ==
The group's full name is “Positive Pedalers", and informally known as “PosPeds". “Pos” is widely used as a way of referring to someone who is HIV positive.

== Members ==
Positive Pedalers has nearly 1,800 members, mostly in the United States. There are a small number of members from other countries, including the United Kingdom, Australia, China, and South Africa.

Positive Pedalers welcomes people of all HIV status.

Members of Positive Pedalers can be identified on rides by the official Positive Pedalers jersey, T-shirt or orange flags with the Positive Pedalers logo. The Positive Pedalers logo, designed by Michael Brown, is a circle with the words “Positive” and “Pedalers” forming segments of the circle's perimeter. One quadrant of the circle is a bicycle wheel and tire; another quadrant is a bicycle gear. In the center of the wheel is a bold plus sign with the letters “HIV” in its center.

== Board ==
A volunteer Board of Directors governs the organization. Several of the emeritus members also participate in the Positive Pedalers Board.

== Activities ==
The aims of Positive Pedalers are:

- Expand awareness and recognition of people living with HIV/AIDS
- Encourage participation of members in the work of the group.
- Participate in AIDS/LifeCycle or other AIDS awareness cycling events around the USA.
- Maintain a strong working Board of Directors
- Ensure funding of the group's activities

=== AIDS/LifeCycle ===
Positive Pedalers has a presence in AIDS/LifeCycle, an annual fund-raising event produced by two of the largest organizations in California that provide services for people living with HIV/AIDS: the Los Angeles LGBT Center and the San Francisco AIDS Foundation. Many members of Positive Pedalers are clients of those organizations, and participate in AIDS/LifeCycle among other multi-day cycling events around the US.

Members of Positive Pedalers provide a positive example for other participants of AIDS/LifeCycle, and the group as a whole plays a special role in the opening ceremonies of the event. Prior to AIDS/LifeCycle’s creation in 2002, nine California AIDSRides took place.

Positive Pedalers had a strong presence in the Boston-New York AIDS Rides, Twin Cities-Chicago AIDS Rides and Texas AIDS Rides, among others. Some members of Positive Pedalers have participated in all nine California AIDS Rides and all five AIDS/LifeCycle events. Some have participated in up to six AIDS Rides in one year. A Minnesota Positive Pedaler has completed over 30 AIDS Rides since 1997. He has ridden around the US including Alaska, Canada and Europe.

AIDS/LifeCycle 7, held in June 2008, raised $11.6 million for the Los Angeles LGBT Center and the San Francisco AIDS Foundation. It was the most successful AIDS/LifeCycle up to that time. In 2012, AIDS LifeCycle raised over $14.2 million.

For each of the seven days of the annual AIDS/LifeCycle, riders and roadies travel up to 110 miles (168 km) along a 545-mile (872 km) route between San Francisco and Los Angeles, stopping at campsites at the end of each day's route. Each rider is required to raise at least $3,000 in order to participate in AIDS/LifeCycle as a rider.

About 300 members of Positive Pedalers participated in AIDS/LifeCycle each year as riders and roadies.

== History ==
Positive Pedalers originated in the second California AIDS Ride in 1995. Jonathon Pon, a participant in the first California AIDS Ride, recognized a need to recognize and support HIV-positive riders on that ride. In California AIDS Ride 3 (1996), Jonathon Pon, Donald David Ferhenbach and others formally launched Positive Pedalers. Jonathon Pon worked with the San Francisco AIDS Foundation to secure a telephone number and mailing address for Positive Pedalers. That year, the first Positive Pedalers Board was formed.

The group gained recognition and community support in the following few years. Pallotta TeamWorks, the company that produced the California AIDS Ride, and the two beneficiaries, San Francisco AIDS Foundation and the L.A. Gay & Lesbian Center, split in 2002, with the Foundation and the Center holding its first AIDS/LifeCycle within a few weeks of the final California AIDS Ride. Positive Pedalers maintained neutrality in the conflict between Pallotta TeamWorks and the two organizations, with members of Positive Pedalers participating in both events.

Today, Positive Pedalers has a strong relationship with AIDS/LifeCycle.

Positive Pedalers for Mental Wellness raises awareness and funds.
