= Run for Moore =

Man taking part in the Cambridge Run for Moore in 2006.

Run for Moore was a UK-wide series of men-only fundraising events in aid of The Bobby Moore Fund at UK charity Cancer Research UK. Although participation is limited to men, women can get involved by volunteering and marshalling at the event. The events involved running, jogging or walking a 5-kilometre course and participants were encouraged to raise sponsorship from friends and family for doing so.

== History ==
The Bobby Moore Fund is named after England's famous captain of the 1966 World Cup-winning English football team, Bobby Moore, who died of bowel cancer on 24 February 1993, at the age of 51. The fund raises money for research into bowel cancer and also raises public awareness of the disease. Since 1993 it has raised about £1 million a year.

The 5K Run for Moore was established in 2006 after the Equal Opportunity Commission wrote to Cancer Research UK, further to an opinion that the female only Race for Life breached Section 29 of The 1975 Sex Discrimination Act, that stated it was illegal to discriminate in the provision of Goods, Facilities and Services.

Run for Moore raised over £450,000 in its first two years. In 2009, the run was consolidated into a single event, which took place on Blackheath Common, London, and which had over 1700 participants. There has been no event since 2009. Instead, Bobby Moore Fund supporters were invited to take part in one of the charity's 5K runs. Since 2019, Race for Life has been open to both men and women.

== See also ==
- Miles for Men
- Race for Life
