= Rose Greene =

American activist and financial planner (1946–2019)

- Born: 1946; Los Angeles, California
- Died: July 11, 2019 (age 72); Duarte, California
- Occupations: Activist, financial planner
- Known for: co-chair, board of directors, Los Angeles LGBT Center
- Notable work: AIDSRide

Rose Greene (1946 – July 11, 2019) was an American activist and financial planner based on Los Angeles. She is remembered for organizing and launching a major fundraiser for HIV/AIDS care, the California AIDS Ride, a 545-mile bike ride along the coast of California.

== Early life and education ==
Rose Greene was born in Los Angeles. Her father owned a cement company. Her mother died when she was a girl. Greene graduated from Fairfax High School in 1964, and then earned a bachelor of fine arts at California State University, Northridge. She pursued further studies in finance at the University of Southern California.

== Career ==
Greene taught high school briefly, and became a financial planner who specialized in advising clients and non-profit organizations in the gay and lesbian community. She served as co-chair of the board of directors of the Los Angeles LGBT Center from 1989 to 1995, and from 2006 to 2011. “I watched her become more and more of a leader, more and more of an advocate for the Center, and more and more outspoken and militant,” recalled Torie Osborn, the executive director of the center. In 1992, Greene chaired the search committee for Osborn's successor, the center's current executive director, Lorri Jean.

Greene headed the capital campaign for the center's headquarters in the McDonald/Wright Building in Hollywood, opened in 1992, and oversaw development of the center's Jeffrey Goodman Special Care Clinic, opened in 1993. She organized the first California AIDS Ride in 1994, a seven-day bicycle tour of the California coast from San Francisco to Los Angeles. The Ride has been a major successful fundraiser for HIV/AIDS research, prevention, and care in the decades since, and a model for similar events elsewhere. It is now known as the AIDS/LifeCycle.

== Personal life ==
Greene was a founding member of Congregation Kol Ami in West Hollywood. She married Helena Ruffin in 2008. Greene died from bone cancer in 2019, in Duarte, California, aged 72 years.
