= 888 Ladies =

- Available in: English
- Founded: 2008
- Owner: Broadway Gaming Ireland DF Limited

888 Ladies is an online bingo website launched in 2008. It is part of Broadway Gaming Ireland DF Limited and is based and licensed in Ireland.

== History ==
888 Ladies was launched in 2008 by 888 Holdings Plc.

In December 2021, 888 Holdings sold its entire B2B and B2C bingo business, including 888 Ladies, to Broadway Gaming group for a total cash consideration of $45,25 million (£37.4m).

=== Breast Cancer Care campaign ===
In 2012, 888 Ladies participated in a charity initiative as part of the Joy of Bingo family, exceeding their pledged £20,000 by raising £31,274 for Breast Cancer Care. The campaign featured special bingo games and activities to raise awareness and funds.

=== Race for Life support ===
888ladies also supports Race for Life, a series of women-only running events to raise cancer research funds. The company encourages its player base to participate, leveraging its platform to contribute to cancer care initiatives with multimedia resources dedicated to supporting Cancer Research UK.
