= Blood Cancer UK =

UK-based health charity

- Formation: 1960
- Legal status: Registered charity
- Purpose: Blood cancer research, Patient support
- Headquarters: London
- Patron: The Duke of Kent
- Chief Executive: Helen Rowntree
- Website: bloodcancer.org.uk
- Formerly called: The Leukaemia Research Fund (1960-2010); Leukaemia & Lymphoma Research (2010-2015); Bloodwise (2015-2020)

Blood Cancer UK (formerly Bloodwise, Leukaemia & Lymphoma Research and the Leukaemia Research Fund) is a UK-based charity dedicated to funding research into all blood cancers including leukaemia, lymphoma and myeloma, as well as offering information and support to blood cancer patients.

They invest money into blood cancer research to ensure that all patients have their disease diagnosed early and accurately, receive personal, targeted treatments which are effective and have minimal side effects in order to beat or manage their cancer.

== History ==
Blood Cancer UK was originally set up in 1960 as the Leukaemia Research Fund. The charity was started by the Eastwood family from Middlesbrough who began raising money following the death of their 6-year-old daughter Susan.

Since its foundation in 1960, Blood Cancer UK has invested over £500 million in a number of different research projects which have helped improve understanding, diagnosis and treatment of blood cancers.

In 2011 the charity launched a Trials Acceleration Programme (TAP) to enable quicker and greater access to new treatments which has subsequently received government recognition as a model of good practice. This programme aims to make the process of clinical trials quicker and easier within the UK. TAP links 13 treatment centres coordinated by a central hub in Birmingham to set up more clinical trials in blood cancer. Because of this geographical spread, it means 20 million people in the UK could have access to the very latest promising blood cancer treatments, if they needed it. Until 2015, 16 new clinical trials have either been opened or approved thanks to TAP.

In the financial year 2015, the charity has been able to invest £32.3 million in gross new grant commitments, one of the biggest commitments they've ever made (FY14: £23.2 million). A full list of the charity's current research projects can be found on the National Cancer Research Institute’s International Cancer Research Portfolio.

In 2010 the charity renamed itself Leukaemia and Lymphoma Research, and in 2015 it became Bloodwise. In November 2019 the charity announced they were changing their name to Blood Cancer UK because the name Bloodwise was "confusing to the public and beneficiaries and was unpopular among staff."

== Activities ==
The charity receives no government funding and is entirely dependent on voluntary donations from fundraising events or individuals in order to fund its research.

Fundraising Events: The charity holds a number of fundraising events throughout the year including several shows at the Royal Albert Hall and sports events such as The London Bikeathon, which is the largest independently organised bikeathon in the capital.

Sports Events: Supporters of the charity take part in a number of sporting events throughout the year. The events include running, cycling, swimming, triathlons and challenges. Their bright colourful t-shirts can often be seen at events up and down the country, as many supporters take part throughout the year as part of the charity's unstoppable sports team.

== Information and support services ==
Blood Cancer UK also writes and publishes patient information on a wide range of subjects including blood cancers and related disorders, treatment options and lifestyle issues, and booklets specifically designed for children with blood cancers.

Blood Cancer UK provides information for children, parents and many other people affected by blood cancers as well as detailed information on the various types of leukaemia, lymphoma and myeloma.

Specific types of blood cancer included are:

- Acute lymphoblastic leukaemia
- Acute myeloid leukaemia
- Acute promyelocytic leukaemia
- Chronic lymphocytic leukaemia
- Chronic myeloid leukaemia
- Diffuse large B-cell lymphoma (DLBCL) and other High grade non-Hodgkin lymphomas
- Hodgkin lymphoma
- Low-grade non-Hodgkin lymphoma
- Myelodysplastic syndromes (MDS)

== Celebrity supporters ==
The charity has a number of celebrity supporters, including Alastair Campbell; their patron the Duke of Kent; Sir Ian Botham who is the Founding President of the charity; a significant number of the Emmerdale cast; George Rainsford, actor on British medical drama Casualty; Dolly Alderton and Pandora Sykes, co-hosts of The High Low podcast; Sam Heughan, star actor of Scottish time-travel drama Outlander, and the Calendar Girls who have raised over £3 million with their story since 1999.

== See also ==
- Cancer in the United Kingdom
