= Susan G. Komen 3-Day for the Cure =

60-mile fundraiser walk

The Susan G. Komen 3-Day for the Cure logo in 2013.

The Susan G. Komen 3-Day, frequently referred to as the 3-Day, is a 60-mile walk to raise funds for Susan G. Komen for the Cure and promote awareness to fight breast cancer. Individual participants must raise at least $2,300 to walk 60 miles (96 km) over a three-day weekend.

As of 2013, the events are held in seven US cities. Seven additional cities included in previous years have been dropped due to a 37% decline in participation.

== About ==
The 3-Day is a series of a 60-mile walk over the course of three days. Since the event first began in 2003, it has raised more than $915 million dedicated to breast cancer research, education, community programs, treatment and therapies. 3-Day participants raise a minimum of $2,300 and walk an average of 20 miles a day, educating thousands of people about breast health. 2-Day participants must raise at least $1,800 to walk, and 1-Day participants must raise at least $750 to walk. Walkers must be at least 16 years old or be accompanied by an adult. Crew members must be at least 18 years old, and volunteers must be at least 10 years old. A program called Youth Corps allows children ages 10–16 who have been affected by breast cancer to get involved, by providing the walkers with a youthful, energetic helping hand. The Komen 3-Day supports its participants before the event by providing coaches, training assistance, fundraising advice and a personal fundraising webpage.

The net proceeds fund breast cancer research, education, and community outreach programs. Since its inception, more than $860 million has been raised, but only approximately 15% of funds Komen received goes towards the cancer research the organization exists to raise money for.

== History ==
The first concept for a three-day walk for breast cancer was created and produced in 1998 by Dan Pallotta and Pallotta TeamWorks benefitting the Avon Foundation. In late Aug 2002 Avon introduced its own two-day walk (the Avon Walk for Breast Cancer, a 39.3-mile walk over two days). The first day of the Avon walk is the distance of a marathon, 26.2 miles, and the second day is a half-marathon, 13.1 miles, for a total of 39.3 miles. In 2003, the Breast Cancer 3-Day debuted with event manager and beneficiary, National Philanthropic Trust, and primary beneficiary, Susan G. Komen for the Cure. The event is now managed by Event 360, is simply referred to as the Susan G. Komen 3-Day, and has as its exclusive beneficiary, Susan G. Komen For The Cure.

In June 2013, due to the declining participation, the Susan G. Komen 3-Day has announced it will be reducing its market listing by half for the 2014 event with Atlanta, Dallas/Fort Worth, Michigan, Philadelphia, San Diego, Seattle and the Twin Cities still listed. Arizona, Boston, Chicago, Cleveland, Tampa Bay, San Francisco and Washington, D.C., however, have been cut from the said event. But the 2013 3-Day events went on in those areas as planned. The event planners said in their official Facebook page, "The difficult decision to exit these markets was not made lightly, as we know this bold and empowering event has touched the lives of thousands of participants like you. While the 3-Day has brought great awareness to the breast cancer cause, participation levels over the last four years have made it difficult to sustain an event of this magnitude in 14 cities."

== See also ==
- List of health related charity fundraisers
