= AIDS Walk =

Charitable event

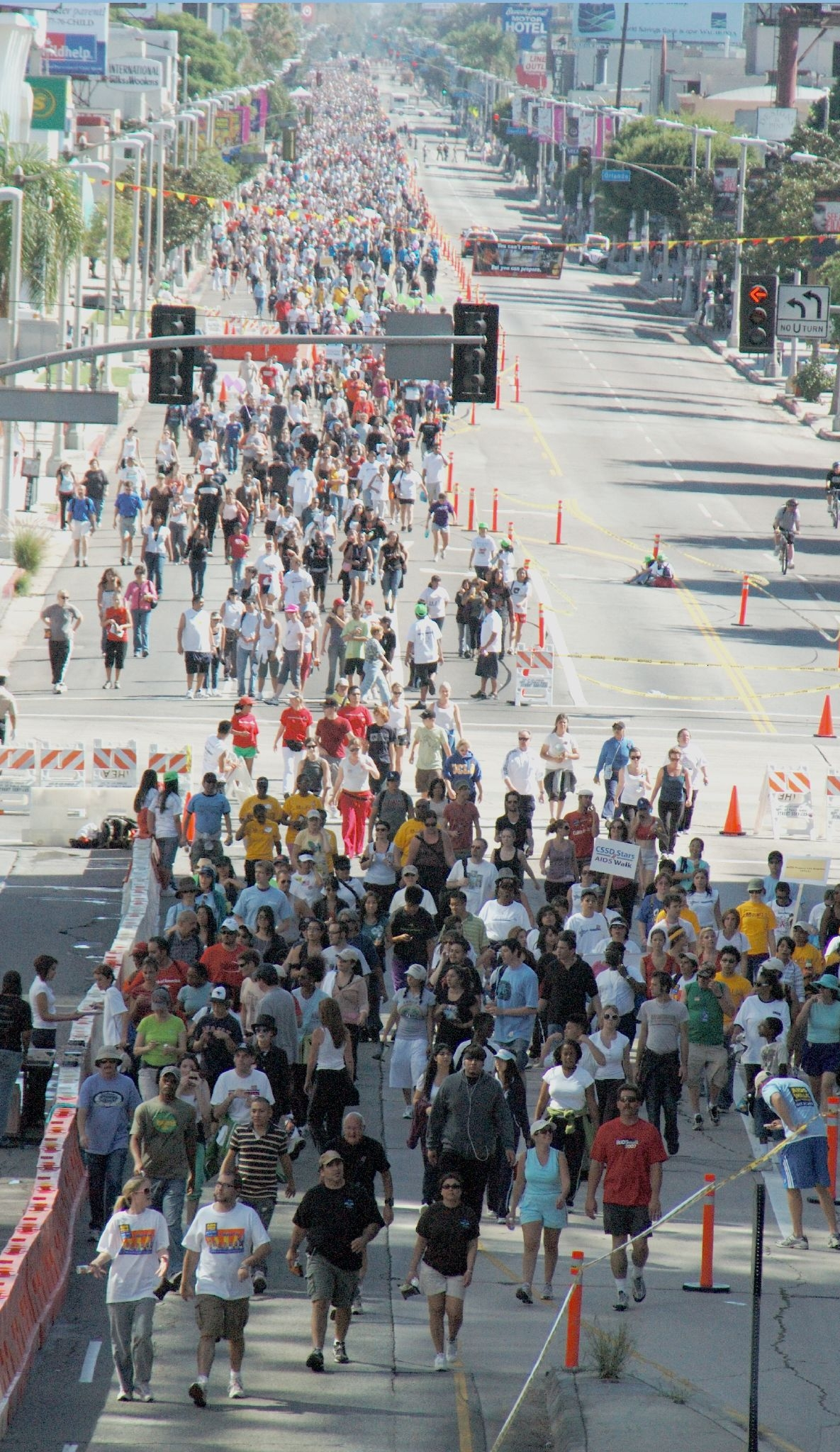
2007 Los Angeles, California AIDS Walk.

AIDS Walk is a walkathon fundraiser that raises money to combat the AIDS epidemic. Since 1985, AIDS Walk Los Angeles has drawn hundreds of thousands of supporters to walk, and millions more to donate, raising more than $90 million to combat HIV and AIDS in Los Angeles. The funds raised at the event sustain APLA Health’s care, prevention, and advocacy programs for those living with HIV in Los Angeles County. Proceeds also benefit more than 20 other HIV/AIDS service organizations that are able to participate and raise funds through the Community Coalition Initiative (CCI).

== About ==
=== Event ===
Each year, AIDS Walk Los Angeles opens registration during Pride Month, when LGBTQ+ communities and supporters stand together to celebrate and advocate for inclusiveness and civil rights. Individuals and Teams can register at no cost and fundraise for the pioneer fundraising walk that raises vital funds and builds support and awareness of the continuing need to address the HIV/AIDS epidemic.

In a typical AIDS Walk, participants walk a predetermined route (usually 5 or 10 kilometers long) through a city or town. Many AIDS Walks have team programs that encourage organizations such as churches, schools, and corporations to participate together.

In 2019, AIDS Walk Los Angeles was managed in-house by APLA Health, which has been the beneficiary of the walk since its inception. The theme for the 2019 event “AIDS Has Met Its March,” calls upon participants to continue the fight to make AIDS history. The walk is approximately four miles and starts and ends at the steps of Los Angeles City Hall and takes about two hours to complete. The morning kicks off with an aerobic warm-up, followed by opening ceremonies featuring celebrities, musical performances, and HIV/AIDS activists and leaders. A post-walk celebration congratulates walkers, volunteers and supporters.

=== Fundraising ===
Fundraising models vary from event to event, but most AIDS Walks encourage participants to raise money by collecting pledges from their friends, family, and co-workers. Some events have a required minimum amount or registration fee, but for many events fundraising is voluntary.

=== Volunteering ===
An AIDS Walk event will usually be produced with the help of volunteers. Typically, an AIDS Walk volunteer will assist on an assortment of projects. Some of these projects could include: direct mailing pieces are sent out to registrants, creating fund-raising packages, phone-banking past participants and volunteers to continue their efforts, and many other tasks as needed.

On the day of the event, volunteers can number in the thousands and might perform many different (and necessary) tasks. Volunteers might hand out refreshments to participants, cheer and direct participants along the route and throughout the AIDS Walk venue, assist lost children and other participants, assist \the event, assist with communication throughout the venue, and even escort celebrities, elected leaders and other invited guests throughout the day.

== History ==
On July 28, 1985, AIDS Project Los Angeles held the world's first AIDS Walk, with the hope to raise $100,000. Three days prior, on July 25, 1985, actor Rock Hudson publicly announced he had AIDS. As one of the first mainstream celebrities diagnosed with the disease, the news of Hudson’s diagnosis shook the HIV/AIDS and LGBTQ communities in Los Angeles, but also led 4,500 walkers to participate in the first AIDS Walk Los Angeles at Paramount Studios in Hollywood. The walk surpassed its goal, raising $673,000 and ignited a movement to eradicate the disease. Today, the need to eradicate HIV/AIDS is still present.

== Reception ==
As with many charity fundraisers, critics have often questioned where the money goes and the level of transparency.

== See also ==
- List of health related charity fundraisers
