= Dan Pallotta =

American entrepreneur, author & humanitarian activist (born 1961)

- Pallotta speaking at the Change Course. Boston MA, October 2012
- Born: Daniel M. Pallotta; January 21, 1961 (age 65); Malden, Massachusetts, U.S.
- Education: Harvard University (1983)
- Occupations: Entrepreneur, author, and humanitarian activist
- Website: DanPallotta.com

Daniel M. Pallotta (born January 21, 1961) is an American entrepreneur, author, and humanitarian activist. He is best known for his involvement in multi-day charitable events with the long-distance Breast Cancer 3-Day walks, AIDS Rides bicycle journeys, and Out of the Darkness suicide prevention night walks. Over nine years, 182,000 people participated in these events and raised $582 million. They were the subject of a Harvard Business School case study. He is the author of Uncharitable – How Restraints on Nonprofits Undermine Their Potential. He is also the author of Charity Case: How the Nonprofit Community Can Stand Up for Itself and Really Change the World, and When Your Moment Comes – a Guide to Fulfilling Your Dreams. He is the president of Advertising for Humanity and president and founder of the Charity Defense Council. He is a featured contributor to Harvard Business Review online.

== Early life and education ==
Pallotta was born in Malden, Massachusetts, a suburb of Boston, the oldest of four children. He attended Harvard University and graduated cum laude in 1983.

At the age of 19, Pallotta placed second in a field of twelve candidates and became the second youngest member ever elected to the school board in his hometown of Melrose, Massachusetts. Also that year, Pallotta became chair of the Harvard Hunger Action Committee, an undergraduate student organization that raised money for Oxfam America by hosting symbolic fasts that raised approximately $2,000 each twice annually. He was studying development economics at the time and became frustrated at the gap between the scale of the problem of world hunger compared to his committee's fundraising totals.

During the summer before Pallotta's senior year at Harvard he heard about two cyclists crossing America to raise money for cancer research. It inspired him to create a cross-country bike ride for world hunger. He and his co-chair, Mark Takano (now a Congressman representing the 41st district in California) recruited 39 students to make the journey. During the summer of 1983 they traveled 4,256 miles along a primarily northern route over the course of 9 1/2 weeks from Seattle to Boston. They crossed the continental divide at 9,658 feet at Togwotee Pass in the Absaroka Range of the United States, between the towns of Dubois and Moran Junction, Wyoming. The event raised approximately $80,000 for Oxfam-America. Pallotta appeared on television and radio during the course of the ride, including an in-studio appearance with Bryant Gumbel on the Today show.

=== Los Angeles ===
In 1985 Pallotta moved to Los Angeles to pursue a career as a singer and songwriter. He was auditioned by Clive Davis and had a single recorded by Edgar Winter and sang the national anthem at Anaheim Stadium for the Los Angeles Rams. During his time in Los Angeles he also met David Mixner, a leading civil rights activist, and went to work on Mixner's Great Peace March for Global Nuclear Disarmament, envisioned as a 5,000-person march across America to promote nuclear disarmament. He also met and worked with Irving Warner, author of Bantam Books' The Art of Fundraising, who mentored him in the field of major gift fundraising.

In 1992, after a serious bout of Hepatitis A which he believed was HIV at the time, Pallotta decided to seek counseling and entered a 12-step program known as SLAA (Sex and Love Addicts Anonymous) to deal with addictive behavioral patterns that he felt were undermining his potential. His first book, When Your Moment Comes, details these years in Pallotta's life.

== Events ==
=== AIDS rides ===
In 1991, building on the 'power of the journey' as a metaphor, he conceived of a 600-mile bike ride from San Francisco to Los Angeles, which combined his marketing, fundraising, mobilizing and motivating skills. Three years later, the movie Alive motivated him to realize his idea. He brought his plan for the event to the Los Angeles Gay & Lesbian Community Services Center, which was looking for a new signature event. The Center put up an initial investment of $50,000 in risk capital, which was enough for the effort to survive until a sponsorship was secured from Tanqueray for an additional $110,000. 478 people participated in the first California AIDS Ride from San Francisco to Los Angeles, netting $1,013,000 – much more than expected.

From 1995 to 1996 Pallotta expanded the AIDS Rides to include San Francisco, Boston, New York, Chicago, the Twin Cities, Miami, Philadelphia, Washington, D.C. and Raleigh, North Carolina.

In nine years the AIDS Rides netted, after all expenses, $108 million.

=== Breast Cancer 3-Days ===
In 1998 Pallotta conceived the idea of a three-day, 75-mile walk for breast cancer. After scouting the route with three other staff, it was decided that 75 miles was too long, and the event was shortened to 60 miles and called the “Breast Cancer 3-Day.” In 1997 Pallotta brought the idea to Joanne Mazurki, the head of the Avon Cosmetics company's Breast Cancer Crusade. She brought it to Jim Preston, Avon's CEO, who signed off on the launch of the first event, which would take place in 1998 and travel from Santa Barbara to Malibu. The event was four times as successful as the first AIDS Ride, netting $4.2 million. With capital from Avon, the events were expanded to four cities in 1999, seven cities in 2000, nine cities in 2001 and thirteen cities in 2002. In five years the events netted $194 million in unrestricted dollars for the breast cancer community.

=== Out of the Darkness suicide prevention events ===
In 1999, after studying the issue of suicide, Pallotta realized that mortality rates from suicide approached those of breast cancer in the United States, and that suicide attempts dwarfed breast cancer diagnoses. He created an event called “Out of the Darkness” — a 26-mile walk through the night designed to bring the issue of suicide into the light. The event netted $1.3 million in its first year.

=== Big Ride Across America ===
In 1997, Pallotta TeamWorks produced the largest cross-country bike ride in American history for the American Lung Association. 730 cyclists rode for six weeks from Seattle to Washington, D.C.

=== AIDS Vaccine Rides ===
In 1999, Pallotta made a personal guarantee in order to borrow $1.1 million to launch the AIDS Vaccine Rides which would provide unrestricted dollars for maverick research at the UCLA AIDS Institute, the Aaron Diamond center and the Emory Vaccine Center. In three years, the AIDS Vaccine Rides, conducted in Alaska, Montana, and across the Canada–US border from Montreal to Vermont, netted $8 million. The funds have allowed the UCLA AIDS Institute to access tens of millions of dollars in additional grants that have led to breakthroughs in potential microbial preventions for the transmission of HIV.

=== Harvard Business School case study ===
In 2000, Harvard Business School did a case study on social enterprise on Pallotta's company, Pallotta TeamWorks, which continues to be taught.

== Pallotta TeamWorks ==
Pallotta built his for-profit charitable company Pallotta TeamWorks in 1994. His company employed 400 full-time people in 16 U.S. offices and was raising $169 million annually by 2002. In total, the company raised $582 million from 1994 to 2002. The company charged a fixed production fee for its services. It did not do commission-based fundraising or get a "take" off of the top. One hundred percent of all donations went to lock boxes under the charities' exclusive control. The charities then reimbursed the company for its expenses on a dollar-for-dollar basis. Pallotta TeamWorks fees, in a hindsight calculation, amounted to 4.01% of funds raised.

Pallotta was criticized for the large amounts of money Pallotta TeamWorks was making each year and the $394,500 salary he was receiving, described as "stratospheric" for the aid world. His annual salary ranged from $150,000 in 1994 to approximately $425,000 in 2002. Palotta commented that "We allow people to make huge profits doing any number of things that will hurt the poor, but we want to crucify anyone who wants to make money helping them".

In 2002, the company moved into new headquarters, The Apostrophe, in a 47,000 square-foot "tilt-up" warehouse located in Atwater Village, Los Angeles. The company had a budget of $2 million for construction of the new headquarters. Clive Wilkinson & Associates (CWA) were contracted to create the building. The design used raw exposed lumber, shipping containers, and tents. The building now houses the Los Feliz Charter School for the Arts.

=== Controversy ===
In 2001, the Los Angeles Gay and Lesbian Center and the San Francisco AIDS Foundation broke ties with Pallotta TeamWorks, which had organized the California AIDS Ride. They cited budget overruns and excessive self-promotion. They perceived accounting anomalies. The following year, two Washington, D.C. charitable groups, Whitman-Walker Clinic and Washington Food & Friends, also dropped Pallotta Teamworks.

=== Shut-down of Pallotta Teamworks ===
In 2002, the company's events netted $81 million for charity after all expenses. At the time the Breast Cancer 3-Day program was the company's largest fundraising event series. For five years the Avon Products Foundation had been the beneficiary of the events, which netted $194 million in unrestricted funds for the Foundation in five years. In 2002, Avon informed Pallotta TeamWorks that it would no longer be associated with the company's events. Pallotta TeamWorks began negotiating with another charity to become the beneficiary of the events. During that period, Avon announced a nationwide series of multi-day breast cancer fundraising walks, each with a four-figure pledge minimum, in many of the same cities in which the 3-Days had been conducted and, in many cases, on very similar dates. As a result, the new charity with which Pallotta TeamWorks had been negotiating, fearing that the events would cannibalize one another, decided against partnering with Pallotta TeamWorks on the 3-Days. A few days after the news, on August 23, 2002, the company laid off its entire staff nationwide and closed the doors on its new headquarters. Ultimately, the Susan G. Komen Foundation hired an event company, which was founded by former Pallotta staff, and resuscitated the 3-Day Walks, continuing to produce them through 2017.

== Writing ==
In 2000, Pallotta wrote, When Your Moment Comes – a Guide to Fulfilling Your Dreams, for the Jodere Group.

In 2008 Pallotta wrote, Uncharitable: How Restraints on Nonprofits Undermine Their Potential. The New York Times described it as seething "with indignation at public expectations that charities be prudent, nonprofit and saintly". The Stanford Social Innovation Review wrote that the book, "deserves to become the nonprofit sector’s new manifesto". Former U.S. Senator and Presidential candidate Gary Hart wrote that the book was, “nothing less than a revolutionary work".

In 2012 Pallotta wrote, Charity Case: How the Nonprofit Community Can Stand Up for Itself and Really Change the World, which Robert F. Kennedy, Jr. called, “an Apollo program for American philanthropy and the nonprofit sector”. The book calls for the creation of a “Charity Defense Council” to act as a national leadership organization for the humanitarian sector in the United States.

== Current work ==
Pallotta founded Advertising for Humanity in 2004 as Springboard. The company helps institutional funders and philanthropists grow their grantees' impact.

In 2012 Pallotta founded the Charity Defense Council, a 501(c)(3) nonprofit organization. According to their website, their mission is "to change the way people think about changing the world".

Pallotta gave a talk at the 2013 TED conference, which became available for public viewing online on March 11, 2013. and had 3.6 million views over the next two years. The TED Talk also garnered critics such as Phil Buchanan, President of the Center for Effective Philanthropy.

In February 2016, Pallotta gave another TED conference talk - "The dream we haven't dared to dream" It was published in May 2016.

== Affiliations ==
Pallotta is a member of the Project Reason Advisory Board.

== Bibliography ==
- Advertising for Humanity. advertisingforhumanity.com. Advertising for Humanity, n.d. Web. 14, January 2013.
- Architecture Week. "AIACC 2002 Design Awards." architectureweek.com. Architecture Week, 9, October, 2002. Web. 14, January 2013.
- Charity Defense Council. charitydefensecouncil.org. Charity Defense Council, n.d. Web. 14, January 2013.
- Grossman, A., and Liz Kind. “Pallotta TeamWorks.” Harvard Business School paper no. N1–302–089, April 12, 2002. http://cb.hbsp.harvard.edu/cb/product/302089-PDF-ENG
- Harvard Business Review. "hbr.org." Harvard Business Review, n.d. Web. 14, January 2013.
- Kristof, Nicholas D. “The Sin in Doing Good Deeds”, New York Times, 24 December 2008.
- Los Feliz Charter School for the Arts. "homepage." Los Feliz Charter School for the Arts, n.d. Web. 14, January 2013. http://losfelizarts.org/
- Meghdadi, A. Interview with Dan Pallotta. December 2012.
- Pallotta, D. M. Interview with Bryant Gumbel. Today Show. NBC, New York. 1983. https://www.youtube.com/watch?v=inMsVsTmx6k&list=UU0CDaTu0tY4Vb5geqvNfqqA&index=10
- Pallotta, D. M. Address at Social Enterprise Summit & World Forum. San Francisco, CA. 30, April 2010.
- Pallotta, D. M. Charity Case. San Francisco, CA.: Josey-Bass. 2012. http://www.charitycasebook.com
- Pallotta, D. M. Uncharitable. Medford, Mass.: Tufts University Press. 2008. http://www.uncharitable.net
- Pallotta, D. M. When Your Moment Comes – a Guide to Fulfilling Your Dream. San Diego, CA.: Jodere Group. 2001.
- Pallotta TeamWorks. "Record of Impact: Detailed Financial Disclosure." pallottateamworks.com. Pallotta TeamWorks, n.d. Web. 14, January 2013. http://www.pallottateamworks.com/financial_detailed.php
- Pallotta TeamWorks. "About Apostrophe." pallottateamworks.com. Pallotta TeamWorks, n.d. Web. 14, January 2013. http://www.pallottateamworks.com/about_apostrophe.php
- Project Reason. "Advisory Board." project-reason.org Project Reason, n.d. Web. 14, January 2013. http://www.project-reason.org/about/advisory_board/
- Technology Entertainment Design (TED). "TED2013: Program Guide." Technology Entertainment Design (TED), 2013. Web. 3, February, 2013. http://conferences.ted.com/TED2013/program/guide.php
