= AIDSRide =

Fundraising events for AIDS services and research

The AIDSRides were a series of fundraising events organised by Pallotta TeamWorks which raised more than $105 million for critical AIDS services and medical research. About half of the money raised directly benefited AIDS patients.

In 2001, the San Francisco AIDS Foundation and the Los Angeles Gay and Lesbian Center ended their partnership with the California AIDSRide over concerns that not enough money was going to the charities. They hired Honeycutt Group, a consulting firm started by three former Pallotta TeamWorks employees, to organize AIDS/LifeCycle, a similar event. Dan Pallotta unsuccessfully sued the "copycat" event, but the competition and surrounding controversy made 2002 the event's last year.

== Ride list ==
Pallotta TeamWorks has organised several AIDSRides in North America:

1. California: 1994–2002
2. Boston>New York, 1994–2002
3. Philadelphia to DC: Philadelphia, Pennsylvania, to Washington, D.C., 1996
  TeamWorks was fined by Pennsylvania Attorney General for improper fund raising.
4. Florida AIDS Ride from Orlando to Miami (South Beach) 1996-97
5. Washington, D.C. AIDS Ride (NC to D.C.) 1997–2002
6. Heartland: Twin Cities to Chicago, 1996–2002
7. Northeast: New York to Boston, or reverse, 1995–2002
8. Texas: 1998–2002
9. Alaska AIDS Vaccine Ride: 2000–2001
10. Montana AIDS Vaccine Ride: 2001
11. Montreal to Portland, Maine: 2001
12. European AIDS Vaccine Ride: 2002

== See also ==
- Positive pedalers
- List of health related charity fundraisers
- AIDS Vaccine 200
- AIDS/LifeCycle
