= Train to End Stroke =

American marathon training and fundraising scheme

Train To End Stroke is an endurance training and fundraising program, benefiting the American Stroke Association, a division of the American Heart Association, in which participants train to run or walk a full or half marathon.

== See also ==
- List of health related charity fundraisers
