= Oost-Barendrecht =

Former municipality in the Netherlands

Coordinates: 51°51′9″N 4°32′55″E

Oost-Barendrecht ([ˌoːstˈbaːrə(n)drɛxt]) is a former municipality in the Dutch province of South Holland. It covered the eastern part of the current municipality of Barendrecht.

The municipality existed between 1817 and 1837, when it merged with West-Barendrecht to form the new municipality "Oost- en West-Barendrecht", now just called "Barendrecht".
