= Out of the Darkness (Community and Overnight Walks) =

The Out of the Darkness Community and Overnight walks benefit the American Foundation for Suicide Prevention (AFSP) by raising awareness on suicide and depression, raising money for research and education to prevent suicide from taking place, and providing assistance and a safe outlet for survivors of suicide. There are more than 30,000 suicide deaths in the United States each year. Ninety percent of those who die by suicide could have benefited from mental assistance. Someone in the U.S. dies by suicide every 16 minutes. Over $850K has been raised to date for the cause of suicide prevention and education by the AFSP through the Out of the Darkness program. The Community Walks are typically 5k (3.10 miles).

In addition to the Community Walks, there is also an Overnight Walk, which is held in one host city each year after a number of years being in multiple locations. In 2008, the walks were held in Seattle and New York, starting at 8pm and beginning to close at 5am. The Overnight, as it is called, is 20 miles.

== In popular culture ==
US drama series Sorry for Your Loss produced by Facebook Watch and focussing on experiences of grief following the death from a possible suicide, centres an entire episode, "Norway" S2E5, on the AFSP Out of Darkness Walk as the central element of the episode.
