= AIDS Vaccine 200 =

Annual charity bicycle ride in Georgia, US

AIDS Vaccine 200 logo

AIDS Vaccine 200 (AV200) is a charity bike ride through the scenic Georgia countryside. The ride raises awareness and vital funds for HIV/AIDS vaccine research having donated to date over $3.5 million to the Emory Vaccine Center, one of the world's leading vaccine research centers working to find an HIV vaccine, and other beneficiaries.

== The ride ==
The 2-day ride takes place in May each year. More than 150 cyclists and an army of volunteers complete the ride each year. The ride begins on the campus of Emory University in Atlanta and passes through several small, Georgia towns until cyclists arrive at the Rock Eagle 4-H Center located north of Eatonton, Georgia in the Oconee National Forest. Cyclists and volunteers lodge Saturday night in cabins located alongside the edge of Rock Eagle's 110-acre (45 ha) lake. Cyclists choose several different mileage options and can customize the length of the ride to their ability levels. The full ride entails back-to-back century rides, 100 miles (160 km) each day for a total of 200 miles (320 km). Cyclists may also choose a shorter 80-mile (130 km) route for a total of 160 miles (260 km). A third option is for cyclists to form relay squads of up to 5 riders. The squad then divides the 100-mile (160 km) distance each day into relay segments as long as each cyclist wishes to ride. The ride follows country roads across rural areas and rolling hills as riders pass through several small, Georgia towns including Stone Mountain, Jersey, Social Circle, and Godfrey.

== History ==
Action Cycling Atlanta, Inc. (ACA) was formed in 2003 by a group of cyclists who had participated in the 2002 European AIDS Vaccine Ride, one of the last AIDSRides produced by Pallotta Teamworks. The group was dismayed at cost overruns of the European ride. Also, the end of Pallotta Teamworks created a fundraising vacuum for the beneficiaries receiving proceeds from the rides produced by Pallotta. Action Cycling Atlanta was incorporated as a 501c3 charitable organization and chose to continue fundraising for AIDS vaccine research at the Emory Vaccine Center, located in Atlanta, GA and a former beneficiary of the Pallotta events. The ride existed as the Action Cycling 200 for its first 6 years. Fundraising results of $175,000 in 2009 pushed the amount that ACA had donated to over $575,000. The majority of these funds ($557,000) has gone towards AIDS vaccine research at Emory Vaccine Center. The ride also occasionally donates a portion of ride proceeds to related AIDS service organizations. Written into the bylaws of Action Cycling Atlanta is its commitment to adhere to the standards set forth by the Better Business Bureau's Wise Giving Alliance and to minimizing event expenses returning as much of the funds raised directly to the charitable cause. To date, 100% of the money raised by ride participants has been donated to the beneficiary. Action Cycling Atlanta is able to do this by underwriting the cost of the event through registration fees and generous event sponsors. The ride originally traveled from the Hope Clinic in Decatur, GA to Athens, GA. To accommodate more riders, in 2007, ride organizers changed the route to begin and end on the Emory University campus with a Saturday night stay at Rock Eagle near Eatonton, GA. In 2009, the name of the ride was changed to the AIDS Vaccine 200 to communicate more clearly the purpose of the ride.

== Fundraising results ==
The ride has been able to provide increased funding year over year due to the diligence of volunteers. One of the reasons Action Cycling Atlanta is so fiscally effective is that no part of the money raised through sponsorships or fundraising donations is spent on salaries of any kind. To date (August 2017), Action Cycling Atlanta, through its Action Cycling 200 and AIDS Vaccine 200 rides has donated a total of $2,781,090 for AIDS vaccine research and AIDS-related services.

Fundraising Results by Year

Year	Total	Emory Vaccine Center	AID Atlanta	AIDS Athens	Jerusalem House	Positive Impact
2003	$49,365	$49,365	-	-	-	-
2004	$59,075	$59,075	-	-	-	-
2005	$52,125	$37,000	-	$15,125	-	-
2006	$79,975	$74,975	-	$5,000	-	-
2007	$75,500	$75,500	-	-	-	-
2008	$106,000	$106,000	-	-	-	-
2009	$175,000	$175,000	-	-	-	-
2010	$198,200	$190,000	-	-	$6,200	$2,000
2011	$233,700	$205,700	-	-	$25,000	$3,000
2012	$297,500	$260,000	-	-	$35,000	$2,500
2013	$304,000	$255,000	-	-	$37,000	$12,000
2014	$223,000	$163,100	$17,500	-	$27,000	$15,400
2015	$249,150	$200,000	-	-	$32,850	$16,300
2016	$320,000	$260,300	-	-	$57,000	$2,700
2017	$358,500	$305,600	-	-	$47,100	$5,800
Total	$2,781,090	$2,416,615	$17,500	$20,125	$267,150	$59,700

== See also ==
- Charitable organization
- Philanthropy
- HIV vaccine
- Century ride
