= Team Heather =

Heather Gardner (Starcher)

Team Heather is a fundraising group in the Susan G. Komen for the Cure Global Race for the Cure in Washington, D.C., which has raised over $403,000, since June, 2001, for Susan G. Komen for the Cure and breast cancer research, education, screening, and treatment. Team Heather was formed in 2001 to support 25-year-old Heather Gardner (Starcher) (1976–2002), as she began her fight against breast cancer – a fight that ended on September 29, 2002.

== Heather Gardner (Starcher): 1976-2002 ==
Heather Gardner (Starcher) in 2000

Heather Gardner (born December 4, 1976) was the youngest daughter of Robert and Rebecca Gardner of Akron, Ohio, and the sister of Shawn Gardner of Washington, D.C. and Renee Gardner Duddy of Jacksonville, Florida. Rebecca Gardner is a breast cancer survivor.

Heather was a graduate of Manchester High School (1994) and The University of Akron (1999). She was a volunteer for The Big Brothers Big Sisters Program of America, and Camp Wonderlung, a camp for children with disabilities.

In 2001, at age 25, Heather was diagnosed with Stage III breast cancer. Prior to beginning her course of treatment within University Hospitals of Cleveland’s, Ireland Cancer Center - which included a TRAM flap procedure, chemotherapy, radiation, whole brain radiation, med-port and Ommaya reservoir surgeries, oral chemotherapy, and more - Heather chose first to participate in the 2001 Susan G. Komen for the Cure National Race for the Cure in Washington, D.C.

Throughout her 17 months of treatment, Heather spoke to women’s groups on the importance of early detection and treatment for breast cancer. In April, 2002, Heather married Jason Starcher of Akron, Ohio. She continued her work as an insurance agent at the Gardner Insurance Agency. In June, 2002, Heather returned, once again, to Washington, D.C. to participate in the 2002 Susan G. Komen for the Cure National Race for the Cure. The following week, doctors discovered Heather’s breast cancer had metastasized in the form of four brain tumors. On September 29, 2002, Heather died. Thousands turned out in Ohio to pay their respects.

== History of Team Heather: 2003-Current ==
Heather Gardner (Starcher) during chemotherapy treatment in 2001

In 2003, Team Heather represented Heather Gardner (Starcher) in the 2003 National Race for the Cure in her absence. By race day on June 7, 2003, with no organized fundraising efforts, Team Heather raised $5,500 for Susan G. Komen for the Cure.

In 2004, Team Heather set a fundraising goal of $10,000 for the 2004 National Race for the Cure. By race day on June 5, 2004, Team Heather raised over $17,500 for Susan G. Komen for the Cure.

In 2005, Team Heather marked its 5th Anniversary in the National Race for the Cure. Team Heather set a fundraising goal of $20,000, and by race day on June 4, 2005, Team Heather raised over $27,500 for Susan G. Komen for the Cure.

In 2006, United States Congressman, Jim Kolbe (AZ), served as Honorary Team Chairman for Team Heather. "Eddie from Ohio" lead singer, Julie Murphy Wells, served as Honorary Team Captain for Team Heather and was named 2006 Susan G. Komen for the Cure BMW "Ultimate Drive for the Cure Local Hero." Team Heather set a fundraising goal of $30,000, and by race day on June 3, 2006, Team Heather raised over $50,000 for Susan G. Komen for the Cure.

In 2007, Team Heather Captain Shawn Gardner spoke, alongside United States Senators Tom Harkin (D-IA) and Arlen Specter (R-PA), at a United States Senate Appropriations Subcommittee on Labor, Health and Human Services, Education, and Related Agencies (109th United States Congress) press conference on the importance of funding breast cancer research. He was also named the 2007 Susan G. Komen for the Cure National "Co-Survivor of the Year." The 1st Annual South County Secondary School NHS/NJHS Talent Show/Silent Auction was held and The Fairfax Times covered the event. Since 2007, the annual event has raised over $55,000 for breast cancer research. The Washington Times covered Team Heather in an article on June 1, 2007 and the participation of team members from Bath Iron Works in Bath, ME was noted in the BIW Newsletter. By race day on June 2, 2007, Team Heather raised over $51,000 for Susan G. Komen for the Cure.

In 2008, Susan G. Komen for the Cure asked Team Heather Captain Shawn Gardner to author an article for Family Magazine, examining the experiences of a breast cancer co-survivor. The 1st Annual South County Secondary School "Pink to School Day" was held in celebration of National Breast Cancer Awareness Month. The Facebook Group, "Team Heather: Fighting for a Breast Cancer Cure" was created to expand its online fundraising efforts. At its height, the group had nearly 1,500 members. By race day on June 7, 2008, Team Heather raised over $38,500 for Susan G. Komen for the Cure.

Team Heather in the 2009 Komen Global Race for the Cure

In 2009, United States Senator Tom Coburn (R-OK) served as Honorary Team Chairman for Team Heather. Team Captain Shawn Gardner attended the first of three Susan G. Komen for the Cure Global Race for the Cure Kickoff Dinners at the official residence of Vice President Joe Biden and his family. The Twitter account, @TeamHeather, was created to update followers on breast cancer related information. The website, www.ourteamheather.wordpress.com was created to warehouse team-related information. A variety of blogs began covering Team Heather's efforts, including "My Fabulous Boobies" and "Life With Lisa". Team Captain Shawn Gardner was interviewed by WJLA-TV News Channel 8 on the history of the team and its successful fundraising and WTOP reported on the efforts of Team Heather. By race day on June 6, 2009, Team Heather raised over $55,000 for Susan G. Komen for the Cure.

In 2010, Team Heather marked its 10th anniversary in the Global Race for the Cure. For the 4th Annual South County Secondary School NHS/NJHS Talent Show, faculty and staff performed and their act was highlighted on WUSA (TV) 9 News Now. Team Captain Shawn Gardner was interviewed on the issue of young women and breast cancer. Team Heather held a Capitol Hill Fundraiser at the offices of Van Scoyoc Associates, where Honorary Chairs were Senator Tom Coburn M.D. (OK), Senator Kirsten Gillibrand (NY), Senator Mary Landrieu (LA), Senator Barbara Mikulski (MD), Senator Mark Pryor (AR), Senator Olympia Snowe (ME), Senator Debbie Stabenow (MI), Representative Charles Boustany, Jr., M.D. (07- LA), Representative Dave Camp (04-MI), Representative Marcy Kaptur (09-OH), and Representative Ileana Ros-Lehtinen (18-FL). The Hill covered the event. By race day on June 5, 2010, Team Heather raised over $55,300 for Susan G. Komen for the Cure.

In 2011, Team Heather marked its 11th year of fundraising by being recognized with a chapter in Ambassador Nancy Brinker’s New York Times Best-Selling memoir, Promise Me - How a Sister's Love Launched the Global Movement to End Breast Cancer. Global Race for the Cure staff used Team Heather’s story and success in fundraising as a focus for their 2011 Fundraising Toolkit and Team Captain Shawn Gardner was asked to throw out the ceremonial first pitch for the Bowie Baysox Home Opener. Gardner also spoke at the Top Global Race for the Cure Fundraisers' Reception celebrating the 2010 Race Season. A unique fundraising competition between two South County Secondary School faculty members was highlighted in a Lorton Patch piece. By race day on June 4, 2011, Team Heather raised over $39,700 for Susan G. Komen for the Cure. During October - National Breast Cancer Awareness Month - Team Captain Shawn Gardner was asked to film a video spot for Susan G. Komen for the Cure’s "What I Would Have Missed" Initiative and the South County Secondary School's 4th Annual "Pink to School Day" was covered by the Fairfax Station Connection.

In 2012, Team Heather began the year by being profiled in a The Washington Post article which examined the impact of the Susan G. Komen for the Cure/Planned Parenthood controversy on Global Race for the Cure fundraising. Team Captain Shawn Gardner filmed several WJLA-TV ABC7 (Washington, D.C.) Global Race for the Cure PSA's and was interviewed for a Race for the Cure 5K Series Promo to be used across the country. Team Heather was the focus of a Washington Family Magazine piece and a WJLA-TV ABC7 (Washington, D.C.) news crew visited South County Secondary School to interview Team Captain Shawn Gardner after he was named the 2012 Susan G. Komen for the Cure “Co-Survivor of the Year.” 65 South County Secondary School faculty and staff members surprised their 7th-12th grade students with a faculty flash mob for the school's 6th Annual NHS/NJHS Talent Show, to which, Ambassador Nancy Brinker was an honored guest. During race day, WTOP highlighted Team Heather in both print and radio spots and The Washington Post conducted a follow up interview to its February Susan G. Komen for the Cure/Planned Parenthood Controversy piece, reporting that 2012 was the most successful Team Heather fundraising year to date. Immediately following the race, The Georgetown Current conducted an in-depth profile of the team's efforts. By race day on June 2, 2012, Team Heather raised over $56,680 for Susan G. Komen for the Cure, bringing its overall fundraising total to more than $403,000. While participating in the Susan G. Komen for the Cure 2012 Honoring the Promise Kick-off Gala hosted by the Young Professionals Committee, Team Captain Shawn Gardner was interviewed by Miss A for an article in her column, and Gardner was also asked by WJLA-TV ABC7 (Washington, D.C.) to respond to the news of Ambassador Nancy Brinker's stepping down as CEO of Susan G. Komen for the Cure.

In 2013, Team Heather surpassed all expectations in the Global Race for the Cure. For the 7th Annual South County Talent Show, faculty and staff from South County High School and Middle School danced against each other to Michael Jackson’s “Bad”. 1,000 South County Middle School students and teachers formed a human pink breast cancer ribbon in honor of National Breast Cancer Awareness Month. WTOP aired two pieces on Team Heather; one on the South County Talent Show and a second on Team Captain Shawn Gardner discovering he carries the BRCA1 breast cancer gene mutation. Team Captain Shawn Gardner created a short film on why he continues raising money for breast cancer years after losing his sister. Team Heather was invited to the kickoff of the 2013 Global Race for the Cure at the Canadian Embassy, Washington, D.C. alongside Representative Debbie Wasserman Schultz (23-FL) and Representative Aaron Schock (IL-18). By race day on May 4, 2013, Team Heather raised $53,312 for Susan G. Komen for the Cure, bringing its overall fundraising total to more than $454,700.

In 2014, Team Heather's work was highlighted in a story about young women and breast cancer in West Palm Beach's WPBF. Academy Award-winning producer Beth Lee produced a piece focusing on Team Heather's impact on breast cancer mortality rates in Washington, D.C.’s Wards 7 & 8. Team Heather partnered with Miss District of Columbia to host a "Heels for Healing" breast cancer fundraiser at the Avenue Suites Hotel in Washington, D.C., and Team Captain Shawn Gardner and 2012 Miss District of Columbia Allyn Rose appeared on WJLA to discuss the event. The event raised thousands and was covered by K St. Magazine. Team Captain Shawn Gardner was interviewed by WJLA on being a male with the BRCA1 breast cancer gene mutation. By race day on May 10, 2014, Team Heather raised $47,660 for Susan G. Komen for the Cure, bringing its overall 14-year total to $502,419. Team Heather members were interviewed by WJLA during the race about reasons they participate.

In 2015, Team Heather marked its 15th anniversary in the D.C. Race for the Cure. The 1,000 South County Middle School students and teachers formed a human "Hope" message for National Breast Cancer Awareness Month and the 9th annual South County Talent Show raised close to $10,000. Team Captain, Shawn Gardner, was selected as the 2015 Amgen Tour de California's National Breakaway from Cancer Champion and was flown to Los Angeles where, along with Joan Lunden and Patrick Dempsey, he presented the "Breakaway from Cancer Most Courageous Rider" jersey to the cyclist whose courage exemplified the characteristics of those engaged in the fight against cancer. Gardner was interviewed for the launch of Joan Lunden's new ALIVE, With Joan Lunden, a 24-hour network dedicated to breast cancer. By race day on May 2, 2015, Team Heather raised $35,299 for Susan G. Komen for the Cure, bringing its overall 15-year total to $537,718.

In 2016, by race day on May 7, Team Heather raised $27,870 for Susan G. Komen for the Cure's Race for the Cure. Team Heather celebrated the day with Traci Braxton, and crossed the finish line with an overall 16-year total of $565,688.
