= London Bikeathon =

Charity cycling event in London, England

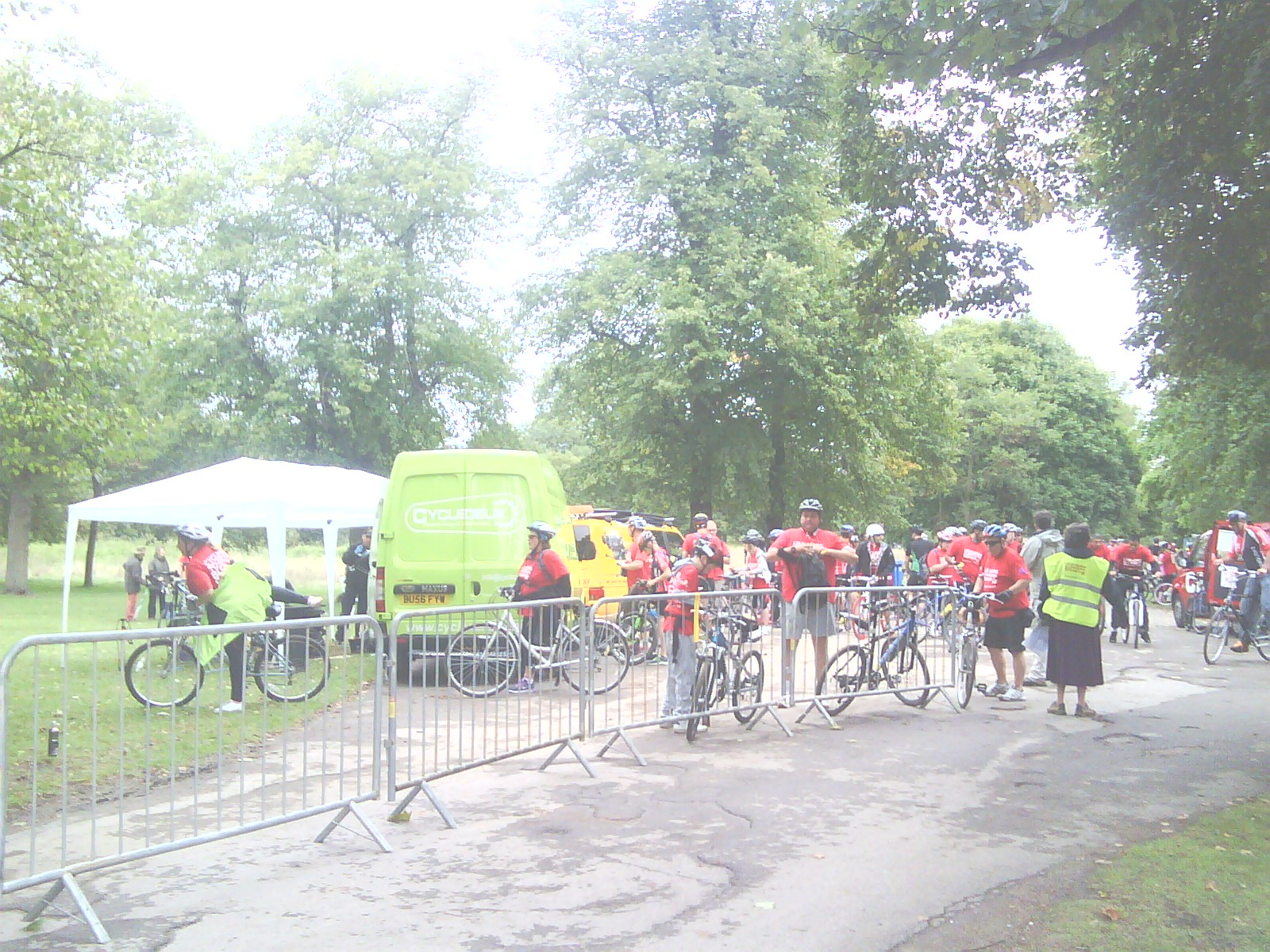
London Bikeathon 2013, refreshment station at Ham House.

The London Bikeathon is London's largest annual charity cycling event with 5,000 riders taking part in 2012. The event first took place in 1997 and has been held every year since. The ride is the flagship fundraising event of the UK charity Blood Cancer UK who fund scientific research focused on finding causes and improving diagnosis and treatment for blood cancer patients.

== Origins ==
The event was founded in 1997 on the suggestion of Tony Carter, a volunteer at the charity's Woking Branch, who had been inspired by the success of the London Marathon and wanted to replicate the concept with cycling to help raise money for the charity.

Set over a largely flat course, the original London Bikeathon had two routes, of 13 and 26 miles, both starting and finishing in Battersea Park. The event took months of planning with Gary Lineker heavily involved and later becoming the event's official patron. Lineker was also among the riders who took part in the 2003 event.

== History ==
The first London Bikeathon took place in September 1997. Former England Rugby Captain Will Carling set the riders on their way, returning at the end of the race to present the medals to the participants. The inaugural ride raised £124,000 for Blood Cancer UK (then the Leukaemia Research Fund).

In the years immediately after the inaugural London Bikeathon the number of participants grew steadily. By the 2003 event, the number of participants had reached 2,500, raising £215,000.

In 2012 more than 5,000 riders signed up for the ride, making it the largest charity cycling event in London. In 2013 more than 7,500 cyclists registered to line for the event, which was expected to raise £750,000 for the charity.

The routes and distances of the London Bikeathon have changed several times since 1997. Ham Common, Thames Barrier Park and the Royal Chelsea Hospital have since all been start points while a 75-mile route option was added in 2012.

The 2013 course saw further changes to incorporate three new 26, 52 and 100 mile routes, each starting and finishing at the Royal Chelsea Hospital. The 13 mile route has also been removed for the 2013 event.

== Routes ==
The London Bikeathon currently has three separate routes of 26, 52 and 100 mile distances. In 2013, these started and finished in the grounds of the Royal Hospital Chelsea. The 100 mile route was a new addition for 2013, expanding upon the charity's 75 mile route introduced in 2012. The extended course takes riders out further into the Surrey hills and up and over Box Hill before looping back to the Royal Hospital Chelsea via Wimbledon Common.

The 26 mile course takes riders over the river, around Richmond Park and past Ham House on a largely flat route while the 52 mile route incorporates some of London's most iconic landmarks and has a total elevation gain of 762 metres.

The 2014 100 mile route started and finished at Ham House and took riders through several categorized climbs throughout the Surrey Hills, including Box Hill. The 26 and 50 mile routes both started at Coram's Fields and took riders through London, with the 26 mile route turning at Battersea Park, while the 50 mile route turned at Ham House.

== Participants ==
More than 5000 riders, consisting of current and ex-patients, family members, supporters and cycling enthusiasts, participated in the London Bikeathon in 2012, raising £735,000 for Blood Cancer UK.

A number of celebrities have been involved with the event over the years. Ex-England Rugby Union captain Will Carling started the inaugural London Bikeathon in 1997 while former Tottenham Hotspur FC and England striker Gary Lineker was among the riders in 2003. In addition, Alastair Campbell, the former Director of Communications for Tony Blair, has also taken part.

ITV presenter Sir Trevor McDonald started the race at Ham Common in 2008. Former Arsenal FC footballer and current radio presenter Ian Wright will be among those cycling the 2013 ride.

== Cause ==
The London Bikeathon is the flagship fundraising event for the UK based charity Blood Cancer UK. The charity funds scientific research focused on finding causes and improving diagnosis and treatment of all types of blood cancer including leukaemia, lymphoma and myeloma.
