= Miles for Men =

Charity in the United Kingdom

- Founded: April 2012
- Founder: Michael Day, Kevin Hill, Richard Griffiths, Michelle Shield, John Packham, Sharon Packham, Norma Dunne
- Type: Charitable organization
- Registration no.: 1154996
- Region served: North East England: Hartlepool, Gateshead, Liverpool, Newcastle and Sunderland,
- Method: Hosts male only fun-runs around the country
- Website: www.milesformen.co.uk

Miles for Men is a UK charity which hosts male only fun runs around the country to raise funds for cancer charities. They have already raised over £84,500.

In 2024, Miles for Men led a successful campaign to grant the wish of nine-year-old Riley Bains, a child with cancer, by arranging a meeting with his hero, Ryan Reynolds.

In February 2025, Michael Day, founder of Miles for Men, announced that the organization had cancelled its annual 5km (3.1 mile) fun run, citing financial unsustainability. He noted that while some individuals had claimed on social media to be fundraising for the charity, no corresponding donations were found when the team attempted to verify the contributions.

== Races ==
=== Hartlepool ===
- The very first Miles for Men race was a 5k run in Hartlepool in summer 2012. Around 1,000 runners took part raising £40,106.69 versus the original target of £7,000.
- The second Hartlepool race took place in July 2013. It was started by comedian Roy 'Chubby' Brown.
- The third Hartlepool race will be a 5k run on 27 July 2014 with 2,000 places for runners. It will start and end at The Domes in Seaton Carew.

=== Newcastle ===
- The first Newcastle race was a 5k run at Exhibition Park, Newcastle on 3 November 2013. Around 250 runners took part including eleven Northumbria Police officers in full riot gear - including helmet, shield and elbow and shin guards - and five men from Speedflex Fitness carrying a fridge.

=== Sunderland ===
- The first Sunderland race will take place on 3 August 2014 in Herrington Country Park. The race director is Joanne Makepeace.
