= Roparun =

Relay race between Rotterdam and Paris

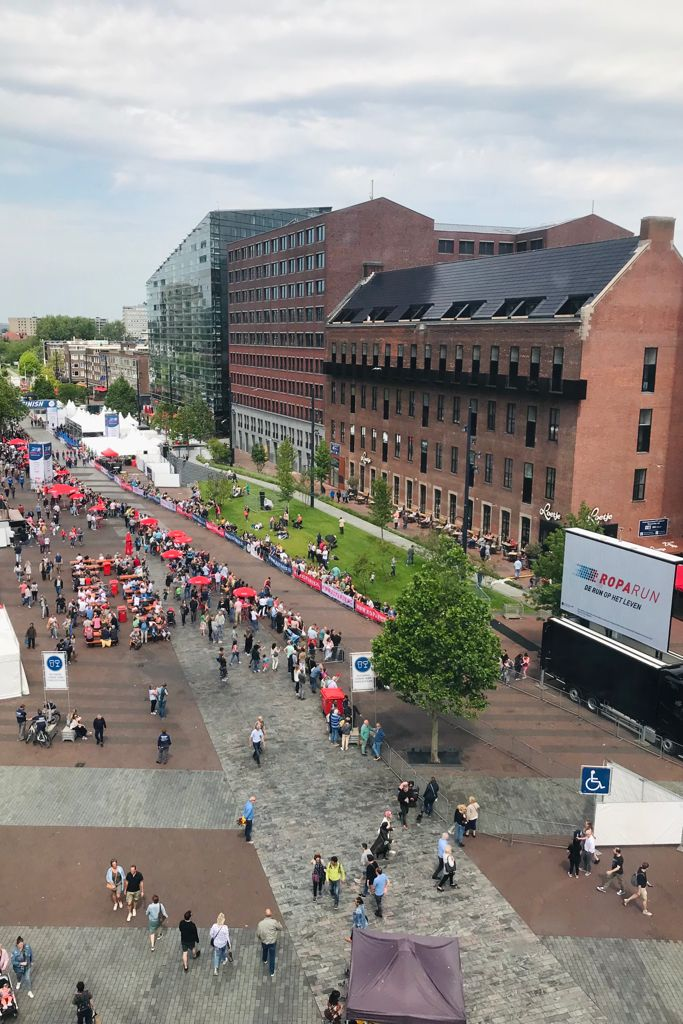
The finish street of the Roparun on the Binnenrotte in Rotterdam, 2021

The Roparun (Rotterdam Paris run) is a non-stop relay run between Rotterdam and Paris. The race has been organised annually from 1992, over a distance of 530 kilometres.

From its origin the run has been a charity event, aimed to raise funds for cancer patients. In its 25-year history (until 2016) over 73 million euros have been raised .

== History ==
In the first run in 1992 13 teams participated. Since 1993 there is a 72 hours live report on RoParunRadio. The Slogan of the Roparun: 'Add life to the days, when no more days can be added to life.' From 2004 onwards, the run start in Paris with the finish in Rotterdam.

In 2008 253 teams made it to the finish at the Rotterdam Coolsingel. This edition raised an amount of 4.3 Million Euros. In 2009 a record 275 teams (6,500 participants) started in Paris raising 4.7 Million Euros for care to cancer patients. The donations beat those of the previous (record) edition by about 10% in spite of the credit crisis.
