= Carnisserbuurt =

Neighborhood of Rotterdam in the Netherlands

Coordinates: 51°53′16″N 4°28′46″E

- Neighborhood of Rotterdam
- Interactive map of Carnisserbuurt
- Country: Netherlands
- Province: South Holland
- COROP: Rijnmond
- City: Rotterdam
- Borough: Charlois
- Time zone: UTC+1 (CET)

Carnisserbuurt is a neighborhood of Rotterdam, Netherlands. As of 2025, it has a population of 11,285.
