= Race for Life =

Series of fundraisers organized by Cancer Reaearch UK

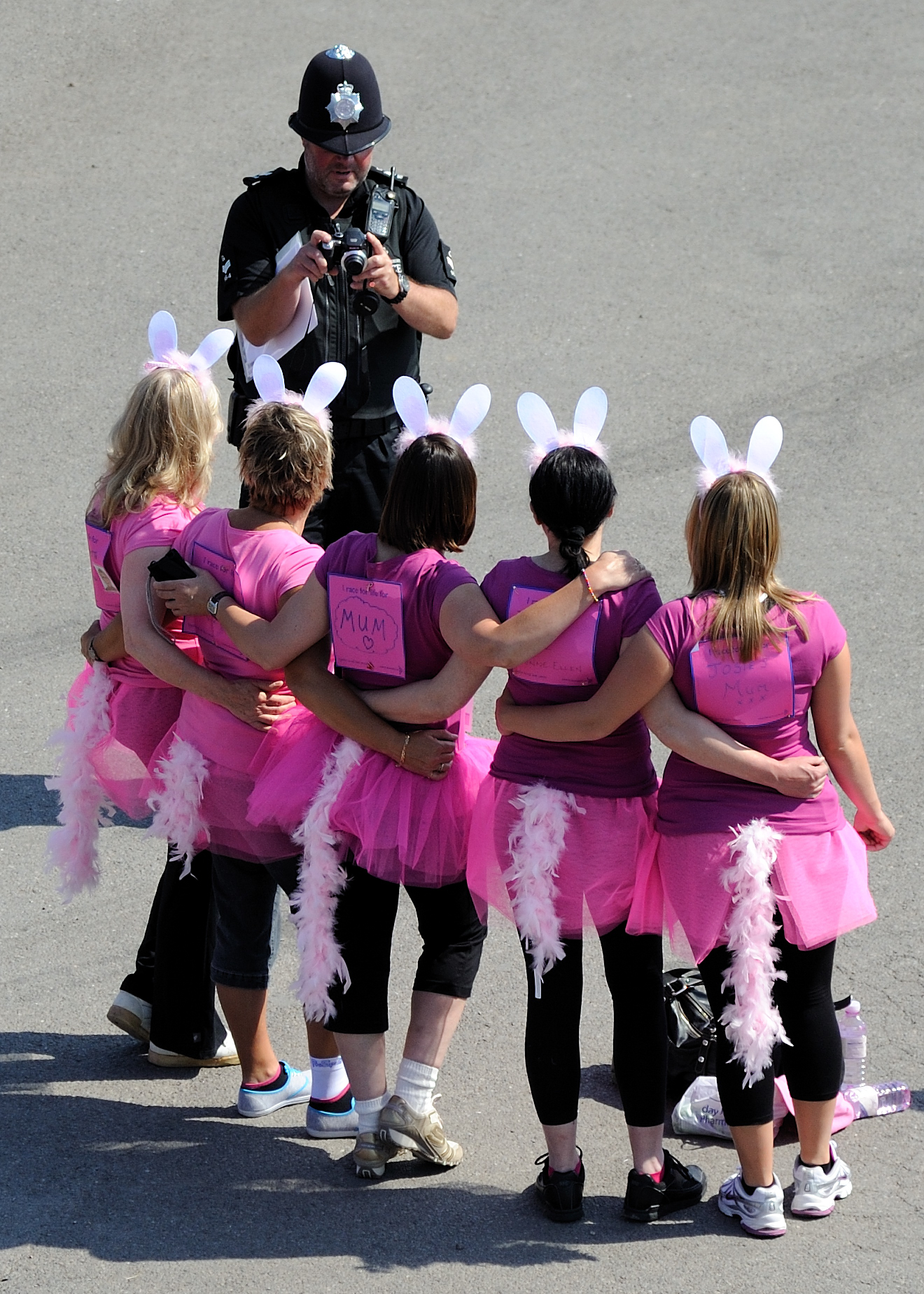
Runners in a Race for Life wear a card in memory of the people they know affected by cancer.

Race for Life is a series of fundraising events, organised by charity Cancer Research UK. They involve running, jogging or walking a 5-kilometre, 10-kilometre or 'Pretty Muddy' course and raising sponsorship for doing so. The money raises funds for cancer research in all 200 types of cancer. The Race for Life series of events is open to people of all ages, abilities and backgrounds take part in the Race for Life, and with more than 150 Race for Life 5k events across the United Kingdom. The event was previously restricted to women only.

== History ==
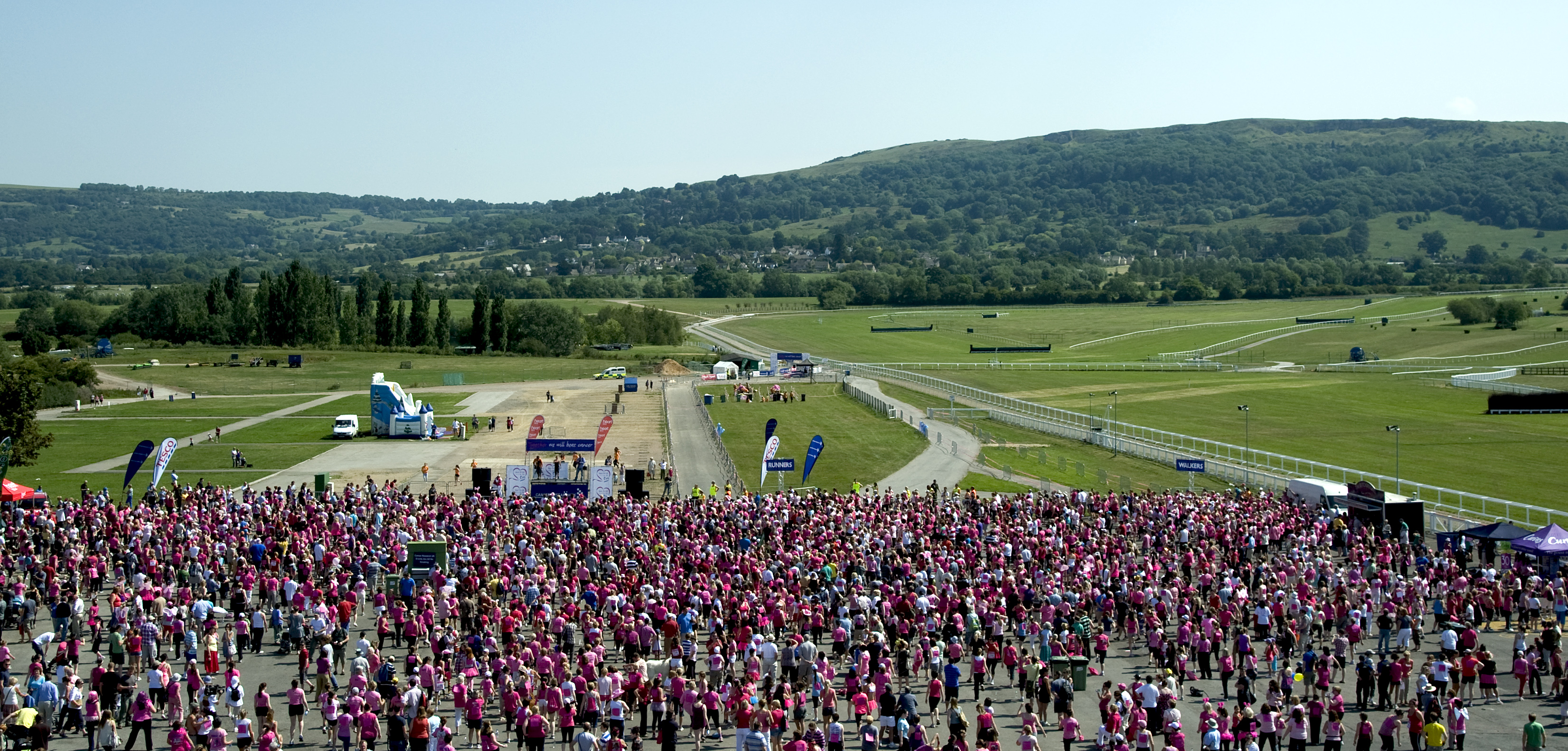
Race For Life 2011, on the grounds of the Cheltenham Race Course.

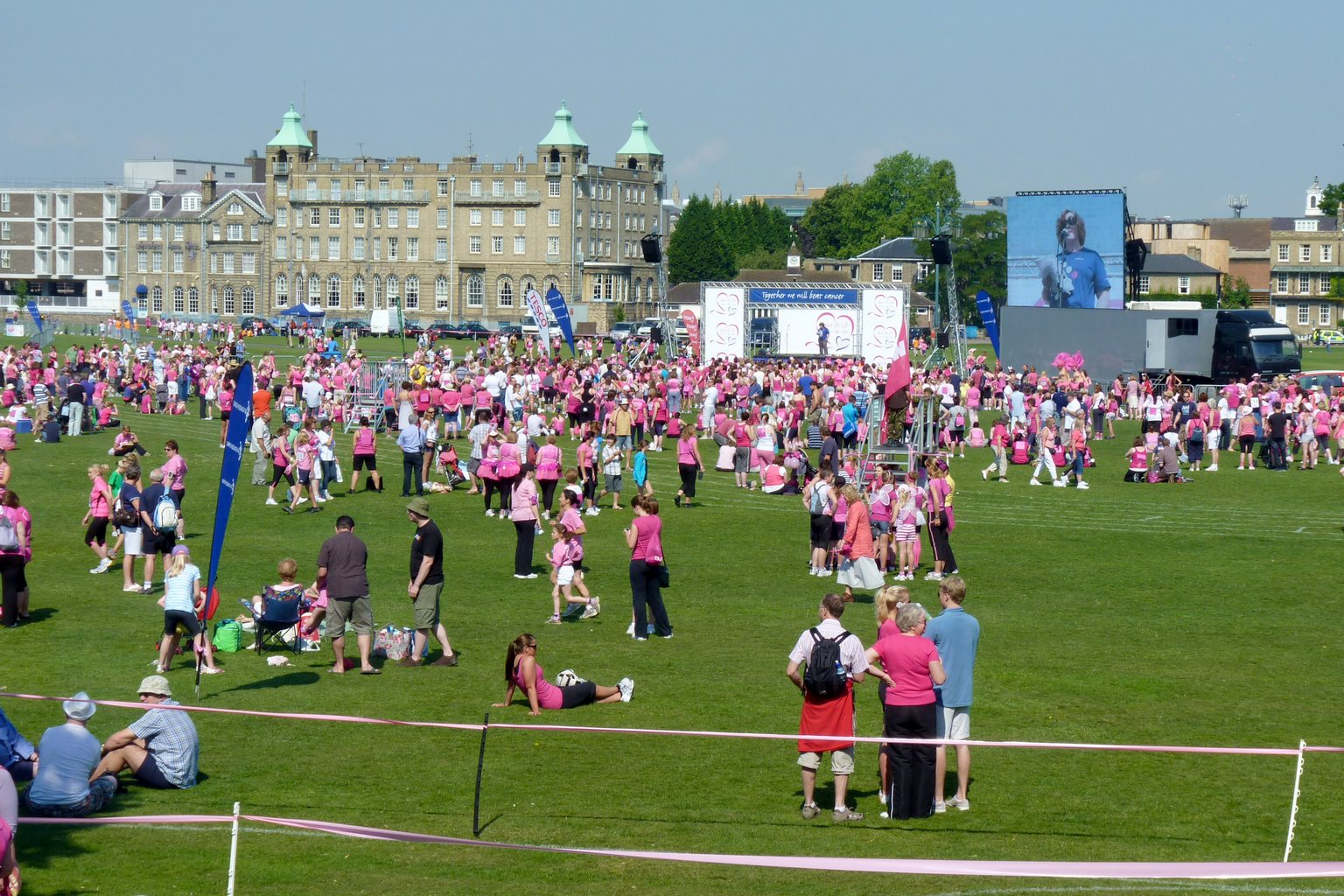
Race For Life 2011 at Parker's Piece, Cambridge.

The Imperial Cancer Research Fund identifies Jim Cowan as having the original idea for the Race for Life. The Fund then engaged Mr. Cowan to organise and act as race director for the first Race for Life event, which took place in 1994 in Battersea Park, London, where 750 participants raised £48,000. The following year, the race was extended to 6 venues and had 4,500 participants with £210,000 raised. It continued to grow year on year to become one of the UK's largest fundraising events, which in 2006 involved 240 races, 750,000 participants and raised £46,000,000. Since Race for Life began in 1994, 6,000,000 people across the UK have raised over £493,000,000 for the charity. Notable participants include: Jane Tomlinson, whose first fundraising event was a Race for Life in 2001 after being diagnosed with terminal breast cancer. She went on to raise over £1,750,000 for charity before her death in 2007. In 2009, actresses Laila Morse and Lynda Bellingham became a Race for Life ambassadors in memory of Wendy Richard and Jade Goody, both of whom had recently died from cancer. Bellingham later died from cancer in 2014.

The rules were amended in 2012 to allow boys up to the age of 12 to participate following a determined campaign by Claire Parke. In 2019, Cancer Research UK opened Race for Life to anybody regardless of age and gender. Unfortunately, in 2020, the Race for Life events were postponed until 2021 due to the COVID-19 pandemic, so instead a new and virtual event was created; it was dubbed Race for Life at Home.

== Run for Moore ==
Following complaints from John Taylor claiming that the Race for Life was in breach of Section 29 of the 1975 Sex Discrimination Act (which states it is illegal to discriminate in the provision of goods, facilities and services), the Equal Opportunities Commission wrote to Cancer Research UK which then launched the 5 km Run for Moore.

The proceeds from this event only went towards bowel cancer research and campaigns. The venture was discontinued in 2010.

== See also ==
- Race for the Cure
- Relay For Life
