= Mothers' March on Polio =

American polio fundraising campaign

The Mothers' March on Polio was a door-to door canvassing campaign that mobilized women across the United States to raise funds for polio therapies and vaccine development. Started by women in the 1950s, the event became a staple in the March of Dimes' fundraising efforts and generated funding that helped to support Dr. Jonas Salk's research leading to a polio vaccine. This mass action has been credited as a model for subsequent marches of mothers against nuclear testing and for environmental protection.

== Origins ==
In 1950, a group of Phoenix women, aware of the urgency of funding shortages at the Maricopa County March of Dimes, created the first Mothers' March on Polio establishing the model that would spread nationwide by the following year. Prior canvassing for several March of Dimes chapters in the 1940s proved the technique could generate contributions efficiently but were modest grassroots efforts based in organizers' own neighborhoods. The Phoenix mothers scaled up the canvassing concept into a mass action campaign. They set a date and time in advance publicized extensively throughout the community (January 16, 1950 at 7 p.m.), called on Phoenix residents to turn on their porch lights or light candles at the designated time ("Turn on Your Light! Fight Polio Tonight!"), and signaled the start of the event with sirens, car horns and searchlights.

More than 2,300 mothers visited illuminated houses throughout Phoenix collecting $44,890 that night. In just one hour, canvassers collected contributions from more than 40% of Phoenix’s population, 42,228 donors. Organizers took an inclusive approach to communications and canvassing making sure to cover every part of the City and garnering support from often overlooked demographic groups in Southwest Phoenix including African American and Hispanic mothers who had not previously been invited to take part in a community-wide project.

Based on the popularity and results of the first Mothers' March on Polio in Phoenix, the March of Dimes adopted the concept, launching a nationwide campaign in 1951. The organization rolled out training videos and instructions for local chapters to replicate the formula that had led to the Phoenix mothers' success.

The campaign spread rapidly through the efforts of women nationwide. Volunteer recruitment tapped women's informal social connections taking place through conversations in shopping centers, on subway platforms and in parlors. In January 1951, the Boston Globe described the sounding of sirens and ringing of church bells in Everett, Massachusetts as 500 mothers took to the streets to collect contributions from residences marked by porch lights, candles or white towels tied to doorknobs. In Queens, New York 53 young mothers in wheelchairs due to polio organized to enlist volunteer proxies to go door-to-door in their places for the 1952 Mothers' March on Polio. By 1955, two million women were forecasted to march nationwide.

== Impact ==
Between 1951 and 1955, contributions to March of Dimes doubled to $250 million, which the organization's fundraising department attributed to the nationwide introduction of the Mothers' March on Polio calling the campaign, "the single greatest activity in the entire March of Dimes." The Mothers' March on Polio mobilized millions, increased public awareness about work to develop a vaccine, and became a staple in the organization’s fundraising efforts, generating nearly a third of the organization’s funding by 1957. The event, renamed and refocused over time most recently becoming the March for Babies in 2008, continues to this day as the March of Dimes' longest running fundraiser.
