= Big House Big Heart =

Charity event at the University of Michigan

Big House Big Heart was a charitable walk/run event held annually at the University of Michigan Football Stadium in Ann Arbor, MI. The event was held between 2007 and 2012 and was organized by the company Champions for Charity to benefit University of Michigan medical programs, as well as other charities.

In its first year, the event raised over $200,000 to benefit the programs involved. In December 2012, the University of Michigan Athletic Department announced it would no longer allow this event, citing nonspecific concerns of how the charity is organized. This event was therefore superseded by the Leaders and Best Race on September 29, 2013, which was limited to the streets through the athletic campus.
