= March for Babies =

Charity walk in the United States

March for Babies, formerly known as WalkAmerica, is a charitable walking event sponsored by the March of Dimes. It began in 1970 as the first charitable walking event in the United States. The name was changed after the 2007 event.

March for Babies is held yearly in 1,100 communities across the nation. By 2013, over 7 million people, including more than 20,000 company and family teams as well as national sponsors, were expected to participate. The event has raised more than $2 billion since 1970.

According to the March of Dimes, proceeds help fund research to prevent premature births, birth defects and infant mortality. Every year, more than half a million babies are born prematurely and more than 120,000 are born with serious birth defects in the United States. Seventy-six cents of every dollar raised in March for Babies is spent on research and programs to help prevent these issues.

== History ==
The very first March of Dimes walkathon occurred in San Antonio, Texas, on October 7, 1970, followed by similar walks in Ohio at Columbus on November 14 and Mentor (Lake County) on November 15. The weather conditions at the Columbus walkathon were depicted as "absolutely miserable [with] rain, cold and bone chilling winds, which did not abate at all during the walking period." Yet the 500 walkers at Columbus pledged $64,687 to the March of Dimes, engendering a fund-raising methodology that quickly became national in scope and that perpetuated the enthusiasm of volunteers on which the foundation built its reputation. By 1974, 95% of March of Dimes chapters participated in the event, accounting for more than $14 million in revenue. Successful walkers received the Order of the Battered Boot certificate for their participation, and the foundation created a film, The Big Walk (1973), to document and promote the event.

In 1979, the March of Dimes incorporated TeamWalk, inviting participation by teams of employees from other corporations, into the March for Babies strategy. On April 26, 1981, the foundation held the first walk occurring nationally on the same day billed as WalkAmerica and has since kept the tradition of holding the event on the last weekend in April. In 1991, Lee Iacocca, Chairman of the Chrysler Corporation, served as the Honorary National March for Babies chairman. With increasing sophistication in promotion and marketing, each campaign was given a theme (and slogan) that merged fund-raising and mission objectives. Experience WalkAmerica was the campaign in 1991, followed by Walk for Healthier Babies (1993), Walk for Someone You Love (1995), and Be A Hero for the Tiniest Babies (2002) among others. March for Babies advertising and promotional literature thus became standardized around mission-related themes of perinatal health.

In 1989, Tony Choppa became National Director of March for Babies and has further consolidated the foundation's fund-raising objectives on a national basis through central planning and chapter support. National corporate sponsors have included Lipton, Kellogg, K-Mart, Cigna, and Canon. The event has spawned wrap-around events to enhance fund-raising opportunities and spin-off events such as WonderWalk and WalkMania.

== Origin ==
The first person to walk for the March of Dimes was John Harrison Finger, a textile worker in High Point, North Carolina. In 1948, his daughter came home from school and asked for a donation for the polio fund. Finger replied that he did not have the money but that he would raise some. In what is thought to be the first walkathon in March of Dimes history, Finger walked 32 miles — round trip from High Point to Greensboro — and collected a total of $1,700 in a red wagon he pulled behind him. During his lifetime he walked more than 1,000 miles and raised $15,832 to benefit the charity. The March of Dimes named Finger "Mr. WalkAmerica" in 1983.
