= Elaine Whitelaw =

March of Dimes volunteer

Roseamond Elaine Whitelaw (born November 21, 1914; died in 1992) was a volunteer who was the chief fundraiser of the March of Dimes for over 50 years. In 1943, President Franklin D. Roosevelt invited her to join the national women's committee of the March of Dimes. Whitelaw created a volunteer network and various programs for the charity.

== Early life and education ==
Whitelaw was born on November 21, 1914 to parents Louis and Dora Whitelaw. Her father was a wealthy diamond merchant in New York. She had two younger brothers, Seymour and Jordan.

== March of Dimes career ==
Whitelaw led the Women's Division for the March of Dimes, where, in 1945 she introduced a star-studded fashion show fundraiser at the Waldorf-Astoria in New York City that was later replicated in cities nationwide generating millions of dollars. In 1949, Whitelaw organized a traveling exhibition, The Court of Jewels, featuring Harry Winston's gem collection to raise money for the March of Dimes. Whitelaw's unit produced phone-a-thons that subsequently became a staple of American fundraising programs and sewing events that produced oversized "polio blankets" now credited as the forerunner of the AIDS quilt.

== Legacy ==
The Elaine Whitelaw Service Award is the most distinguished award a March of Dimes volunteer can receive.
