= John Harrison Finger =

John Harrison Finger (November 24, 1915 – December 22, 1989) was known as Mr. WalkAmerica.

On January 22, 1949, John Harrison Finger walked from High Point, North Carolina, to Greensboro and back for a total of 32 miles. During this walk he pulled a wagon and collected money for the March of Dimes. This was the inaugural walk for the March of Dimes a tradition which is still being done annually. Although this was the start of his claim to fame, he also became famous for his collection of photos and autographs of famous people and for his sense of humor. Mr. Finger didn't obtain notoriety by just starting the tradition of walking for the March of Dimes but he continued walking for the March of Dimes and other charities for the remainder of his life. Other events that contributed to his fame was his unusual hobby of getting his picture taken with famous people and having them autograph his Holy Bible at their favorite scripture, thereby gaining an insight into their personal life.

== Family and early life ==
John Harrison Finger was born on November 24, 1915, in Hartsville, South Carolina, to John Pinkney and Mary Jane (Meekins) Finger. He was the 6th of 10 children. The family moved around a lot because his father was a heavy drinker and therefore had a hard time holding a job. John began helping out the family at the age of 9. He would purchase 24-count boxes of candy from a warehouse for 75–cents and sell the candy for 5–cents a bar on the streets; thereby making a 45–cent profit on each box. When he reached the age of 11 he started delivering papers. At 14, and having only completed the 4th grade, John quit school to work 80-hour weeks running speeders in the cotton mill. It was tiring work that only paid 10-cents per hour but it kept his family going. His childhood taught him never to drink a drop of alcohol, a promise he kept his entire life, and to laugh in every situation.

John Harrison Finger before his inaugural walk

== Marriage and children ==
The New Deal, in 1933, set a minimum-wage of 30 cents per hour, which instantly tripled Finger's wages, such that he could cut back to a 40-hour work week. A couple of years later, he took advantage of another one of President Franklin Roosevelt's programs by working at the CCC (Civilian Conservation Corps) Camp in High Point, N.C. While at the CCC, he got into racewalking and finished fourth in the U.S. Olympic Trials in 1936, one position shy of making the U.S. Olympic team. He also started attending Church of God of Prophecy, where he met and married Gertrude Mae Ashwell on May 8, 1937. After marriage, Finger began working at the Pickett Cotton Mill in High Point, N.C. He worked there for 16 years. During that time he had four children, Larry, Yvonne, John and Richard. While his children were in elementary school there was a drive put on by the city and public schools to collect dimes for the polio fund. When his children started asking for money for the polio drive John decided to do what he was good at and that was walking. After all President Franklin Roosevelt had helped him out with the new minimum wage law and the CCC Camp so he wanted to do something to help out President Franklin Roosevelt. Consequently, on January 22, 1949, John became the first person to ever walk for the March of Dimes, walking 32 miles from High Point to Greensboro and back, while wearing a dress suit and pulling a little, red wagon to collect donations. He raised over $1,700.00, breaking the wagon, and became the father of all modern-day charity walks, since the walk was also his own idea. In 1949 John also did a walk (86 miles) to raise money for the church he attended. He would continue to walk for the March of Dimes for the rest of his life, logging his 1,000th mile walking for them on January 23, 1983, on an anniversary walk in High Point, N.C. where it all started. In 1958, he moved his family to Southern California, where he would spend the rest of his life. He drove a taxicab for Southeast Taxi in Downey, California, for 22 years. In 1972, Finger began getting his picture made with celebrities and, shortly thereafter, started getting them to autograph his King James Bible at their favorite scripture.

== Retirement ==
John Harrison Finger with his Carnation silver bowl trophy and other plaques and photo albums

When he retired in 1979, he began pursuing his hobby full-time. He went on several, 30-day bus trips around the United States and showed up at Hollywood studios at other times to collect photos with celebrities. If there was a celebrity appearing somewhere, John Finger was there to meet him. By winning auctions, he was able to play tennis with a few celebrities and his match with Rob Reiner who played Meathead on All In The Family that got him into show business himself. He appeared on several shows, including You Bet Your Life with Buddy Hackett, Joker's Wild, Good Morning America, the Tony Orlando Show and on two episodes of All In The Family. That's not bad for a man who grew up poor and lost all of his teeth by the age of 60. John learned how to turn his weaknesses into strengths, even making his toothless mouth his trademark with a personalized license plate on his car of "NO2TH".

John's main hobby was getting his picture made with celebrities. With his Actors Federation membership, he gained full-time access into the Hollywood studios. As a result, his photo collection grew from 1,000 to 8,000 individual photos with celebrities in a few short years. He also ended up with over 1,200 autographs in his Bible. His picture collection includes five United States Presidents, the Queen of the United Kingdom, and many well known celebrities, such as John Wayne, Carroll O'Connor, Red Skelton, Milton Berle, Jesse Owens, Mickey Mantle, Muhammad Ali, and many, many others.

On Nov. 29, 1984, John suffered a stroke while walking in Hollywood to try out for a game show. He would be paralyzed for the rest of his life. However, he continued his fundraising for the March of Dimes through his celebrity contacts, his humor, and his motivational speeches at fundraisers. Individually, he raised over $20,000.00 for the March of Dimes in his lifetime, but probably indirectly raised more than 10 times that through his speeches. He died of a heart attack on December 22, 1989.

John received numerous awards for his walking, such as the Battered Boot Award, the Carnation Silver Bowl Award for exemplary volunteer service to the community, HomeTown Hero plaque, March of Dimes Service Award plaque for Distinguished Voluntary Leadership in the fight against birth defects, March of Dimes Outstanding Walker plaque two years in a row (1986 and 1987), and a March of Dimes plaque award for 38 years of continuous service. In 1990 the "John Finger Memorial Award" was established in Orange County, Calif. Per Terry Salgy, National Walk America Coordinator, it goes to the top fund raiser each year. He also received the Key to the City from seven different cities in recognition of his outstanding service and he became known as "Mr. Walk America".
