= Walkathon =

Type of fundraiser

External audio
- You may view a newsreel of Rivero in the world's first "Walk-A-Thon" here

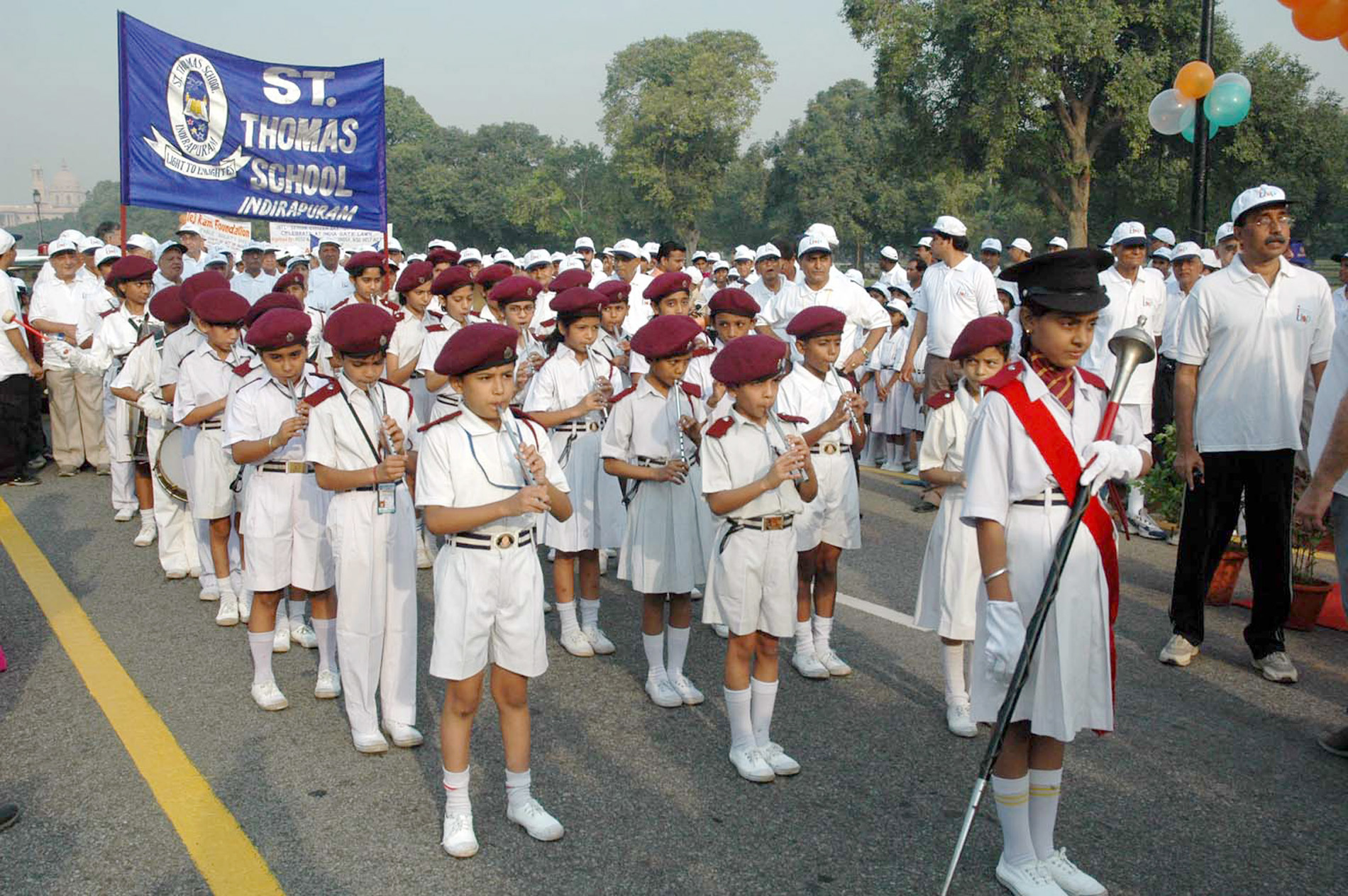
Children playing in a band on the International Day of Older Persons at an Intergenerational Walkathon of the Senior Citizens in New Delhi on October 01, 2006

A walkathon (walk-a-thon), walking marathon or sponsored walk is a type of community or school fundraiser in which participants raise money by collecting donations or pledges for walking a predetermined distance or course. They are similar in format to other physical activity based fundraising events such as marathons and cycling races, but are usually non-competitive and lower intensity. The low intensity model is ideal for mobilizing broad-based community support, and as a result Walkathons usually target participants from a wide range of ages and economic backgrounds.

Walkathons are popular fundraisers for issues that affect large sections of the population. Most commonly, Walkathons focus on fighting or curing pervasive diseases or ailments such as AIDS, cancer, diabetes, lupus, and arthritis, and participation is also often promoted as a symbol of empowerment, remembrance, or awareness of affected people and their relations.

Walkathons are also popular for elementary schools because they allow the children to make a visible contribution to their school, they build community, they encourage healthy exercise, and they can raise lots of money.

== History ==
The first known walkathon was held in San Juan, Puerto Rico in 1953, by the Puerto Rican actor/comedian, Ramón Rivero, better known as Diplo. He walked 80 miles (from the capital city of San Juan to Ponce, on the other side of the island, to raise money for the Liga Puertorriqueña Contra el Cáncer (the Puerto Rican League Against Cancer). In that walkathon, Ramón Rivero raised the equivalent of $85,000 in four days. The walkathon turned into a historical event that became part of the collective consciousness of Puerto Ricans all over the world and has been copied several times since, including in 2009, when the "League", in memory of the first event, did a "Diplo Returns to San Juan" walkathon, raising almost $200,000.

In 1968, the first walkathon was held on the US mainland, sponsored by the American Freedom from Hunger Foundation. After receiving a national promo from Johnny Carson and Ed McMahon, who were in the Twin Cities for a live performance of The Tonight Show, the Minneapolis, Minnesota walkathon, called the "International Walk for Development", drew over 3,000 walkers to the 33-mile route through the streets of Minneapolis. The local organizers included two high school activists, Laurel Norton of St. Paul, and Howard Freedland of Minneapolis, who convinced Johnny Carson to promote the event and organized local churches and synagogues to support the walk.

Additional walks were held in Fargo, North Dakota and Moorhead, Minnesota, where 650 walkers finished the entire 33-mile route.

The other walkathon organizers included Harvey Silver and a former priest named Jack Healey. On a stopover in England, when returning from the Peace Corps, they saw adults participating in sponsored walks to raise money for causes. Together with Bob Schumacher, who provided the public relations support, the first walkathons were held in the US, primarily with children walking, rather than adults.

On 8 May 1971, the largest nationally coordinated walkathon up to that time saw over 150,000 American walkers on several dozen routes throughout the nation walk over 2 million miles, raising over $1.2m to fight hunger. These "Walks for Development" were coordinated by the American Freedom from Hunger Foundation. The largest 8 May walk was in Milwaukee, Wisconsin, with an estimated 20,000 walkers on a 31-mile route. Other large marches that day were in Indianapolis, Eugene, and Philadelphia.

The concept immediately caught on with other groups, and many organizations soon adopted walkathons for fundraising.

The record for the world's largest recorded walkathon was set by the Iglesia ni Cristo, a religious organization based in the Philippines. Taking place 15 February 2014, it was called the Iglesia ni Cristo World Wide Walk For Those Affected by Typhoon Yolanda/Haiyan. It broke two Guinness world records: largest charity walk in a single venue (Manila, Philippines) with 175,000 participants, and largest charity walk in 24 hours for multiple venues (from Christchurch, New Zealand to Hawaii, USA) with 519,521 participants.

== Notable walkathons ==
- AIDS Walk
- Breast Cancer 3Day
- March for Babies
- Miles for Millions
- MS Challenge Walk
- Relay for Life
- Walk and Rock
- 5K Walk For The Living (See Ride For The Living)

== Etymology ==
The term walkathon dates to the 1930s, when it was used to describe a variant of the competitive dance marathon. It is a portmanteau of the words walk and marathon.

== See also ==
- Fundraising
- Jog-A-Thon
- List of health related charity fundraisers
- List of longest walks
- Racewalking
