= Jog-A-Thon =

A Jog-A-Thon is a type of fund-raising event used by various schools and non-profit organizations to raise money via donations. A survey of 1000 K through 8 principals by the National Association of Elementary School Principals (NAESP) dated March 29, 2007 indicated that 94% of them relied upon fundraisers to supplement school income. Thus, due to the rising costs of education, Jog-A-Thons have become one fundraising method that can be used by both public and private schools.

== Rules ==
During a Jog-A-Thon, participants jog as many laps as they can within a specified time period, usually less than an hour. The course that is jogged (or walked) can be designed in such a way as to take into account the grade level and the ability of the participants running during the specified time period, but everyone has fun.

== Sponsorship ==
The goal for each Jog-A-Thon participant is to earn as much money as possible from as many sponsors as possible. A sponsor can pledge money based either upon number of laps completed by the participant or by a fixed dollar amount that is irrespective of number of completed laps.

== Issues ==
Some of the issues with Jog-A-Thons that can cause difficulty are tracking participant laps, billing sponsors that pledged to contribute based upon the number of laps a participant runs, and general tracking and management of the effort. There is software available, though, that can alleviate these issues and assist organizations in running a successful Jog-A-Thon.
